= Houston Independent School District takeover =

State of Texas takeover of Houston schools

The Houston Independent School District takeover is a 2023 takeover of the state's largest school district by the Texas Education Agency, replacing the superintendent and elected board of trustees with a board of managers and a new superintendent appointed by the Texas commissioner of education.

== History ==
During the 84th Texas Legislature in 2015, State Representative Harold Dutton Jr. amended House Bill 1842 to allow the Texas Education Agency (TEA) to take over the Houston ISD. His alma mater, Wheatley High School (Houston), had received low academic ratings from TEA for several years. TEA investigators recommended that the elected board be replaced after finding ethics violations and that the board violated open meetings act requirements.

=== House Bill 1842 ===
Passed in 2015, HB 1842 states that if any campuses fail to meet state standards for five of more years, the state can replace the elected board or close the school.

=== Senate Bill 1882 ===
Passed in 2017, SB 1882 allows school districts to avoid takeover or closure for two years by forming a partnership with a nonprofit or charter operator to operate a failing campus. The new charter school or other operator is also eligible to receive more money per student than the original school district.

=== Conservators ===
TEA has appointed conservators to oversee various schools and policy changes in the district. Conservators have broad power to evaluate a district, initiate changes, and coordinate the implementation of policies. In 2019, the state-appointed conservator prevented elected trustees from selecting a lone finalist for superintendent. After this, HISD was run by the Chief Academic Officer in place as an interim superintendent for over three years.

==== Conservator appointments ====
- 2020: district-wide special education conservators
- 2017: district-wide conservator overseeing the school board and low-performing campuses
- 2016: campus-level academic conservator for Kashmere High School

== Appointments ==
On June 1, 2023, the Texas Education Agency released the names of the superintendent and board of managers appointed by Mike Morath to lead the district. Mike Miles, the charter school leader and former superintendent of Dallas Independent School District whose time overlapped with Morath as a board member, was named as the superintendent. This announcement was preceded by a rumor in May from then-Houston Mayor Sylvester Turner about his selection, which was denied by the TEA. The nine appointed board members are mostly parents of HISD students. They are a racially diverse group that largely lives in more affluent neighborhoods on the west side of Houston. Only one educator with classroom experience was selected. One board of managers appointee, Janette Garza Lindner, had previously run for the board of trustees in 2021 and lost.

=== Members of the Board of Managers ===
As of June 2, 2025, the members of the HISD Board of Managers are:

- Ric Campo
- Angela Lemond Flowers
- Michelle Cruz Arnold
- Janette Garza Lindner
- Paula Mendoza
- Edgar Colón
- Marty Goossen
- Lauren Gore
- Marcos Rosales

Former members of the Board of Managers that have been removed by TEA Commissioner Morath are:

- Audrey Momanaee
- Cassandra Auzenne Bandy
- Rolando Martinez
- Adam Rivon

While no public justification was provided for the removal and replacement of the four appointees, three of them had previously voted against the proposed 2024-2025 budget as well as a progress report where the district claimed not to have made “significant changes to programming or school options without conducting and communicating a research-based analysis of the effectiveness and impact on the achievement of board adopted student outcome goals.”

== Community concerns ==
Community members have raised various concerns after learning of Miles' appointment and his policy proposals. These include:

- Decreased student enrollment and financial instability
- Poor results in other state takeovers
- Heavy focus on standardized testing
- Lack of accountability to families and community members
- Highly-paid administrators
- Punitive disciplinary practices
- Teacher attrition and the hiring of uncertified teachers
- Dual enrollment program reductions
- Closure of libraries
- Poor curriculum materials
- Reduction of special education services and personnel

=== Enrollment declines, financial issues, and school closures ===
With the exception of 2020-2021 during the pandemic, HISD saw its biggest enrollment drop in a decade after the takeover, increasing concerns about the sustainability of Miles' plans and reforms. New Education System (NES) schools saw large drops in student enrollment compared to the rest of the district. Miles is considering bringing a list of schools for potential closure ahead of the 2024-2025 school year as a cost-savings measure. The district projects a budget deficit of almost $250 million after implementing Miles' reforms, however the district currently has enough in reserves to cover the costs.

Even as concerns rise from community members about financial decisions made by district leadership, the board of managers approved a bonus of $126,000 for Superintendent Miles. This is in addition to his annual salary of $380,000.

=== Curriculum concerns ===
Throughout the school year, teachers have raised concerns that curriculum materials frequently contain errors and are not provided well enough in advance. Poor curriculum materials circulated under the takeover administration include sexually explicit middle school content, which prompted the creation of district-wide process review for inappropriate material, and the development of teacher review processes in early October. After widespread pushback in November from parents and teachers to a PragerU video shown to students, the district committed to removing the conservative media outlet's videos from curriculum materials. The video was shown to students in "Art of Thinking" classes, a new course introduced by Miles in 85 campuses as part of the New Education System reforms.

== HISD 2024 bond ==
In June 2024, HISD shared its plan for a proposed $4.4 billion bond. In August 2024, the board of managers approved the bond package for the November election. Ultimately, voters did not vote for the bond.

== Regaining local control ==
The Texas Education Agency has provided three criteria that the school district must meet in order to end the takeover and regain local control. Those are: "No campuses should get failing grades for multiple years, the special education program should be in compliance with state and federal regulations, and the board should demonstrate procedures and behavior focused on student outcomes."

== Other district takeovers ==
The Texas Education Agency has taken over seven other school districts since 2000, and 15 in the past three decades, replacing their elected boards with boards of managers appointed by the commissioner. TEA has also intervened through appointments such as conservators or monitors in at least 51 school districts. As of 2023, these districts are:

- Marlin ISD and Shepherd ISD which still have an appointed board of managers in place.
- Beaumont ISD, Edgewood ISD, El Paso ISD, and Southside ISD which have all regained local control.
- Harlandale ISD, Hearne ISD, Progreso ISD, Pearsall ISD, and Snyder ISD which reached a settlement or were not appointed a board of managers.
- Kendleton ISD, La Marque ISD, North Forest ISD, and Wilmer-Hutchins ISD which were closed after regaining local control. All were predominantly Black school districts.

=== North Forest ISD, 2008-2010 ===
North Forest ISD was officially taken over in 2008, after a history of interventions by the Texas Education Agency dating back to at least 1988. After spending over $1 million on state-appointed leadership including the superintendent, conservators, monitors, and board of managers over five years, local control was regained in November 2010. While test scores rose, a third of the district's schools failed to meet academic targets for the 2010-2011 school year. An external audit found problems with misspending despite the appointment of a financial conservator several years prior. Less than a year after returning local control to North Forest, TEA revoked the academic accreditation of the district for the 2011-2012 school year and ordered the district's closure and annexation. After years of appeals, the district was annexed into Houston ISD in July 2013.

=== Beaumont ISD, 2014-2020 ===
Beaumont ISD was taken over in 2014, and returned to local control in 2020. A 2020 investigation by the Houston Chronicle found that the school district's suspension rate increased dramatically during the first year of the takeover, and continued to increase to the point where students were suspended at a rate six times the average for Texas school districts. During the 2018-2019 school year, Beaumont ISD had a rate of 46 out-of-school suspensions per 100 students, the highest by far in the state. Black students made up 60% of the student population but received 87% of suspensions.

In 2018, three campuses which had not met state standards for at least four years due to low test scores were at risk of triggering House Bill 1842. As a result, those schools were turned over to a charter school operator in alignment with Senate Bill 1882. The district was already under state leadership but the schools could still be closed. As of the 2023-2024 school year, all three campuses are now run by Third Future Schools, which was founded by Houston ISD's state-appointed superintendent Mike Miles.

=== National research on school district takeovers ===
A 2021 study on state takeovers across the United States since the late 1980s shows "no evidence that lead to academic improvements." Through the removal or replacement of school boards that are locally elected, takeovers also close an entry point into political participation and elected office for communities of color. Cities with higher rates of Black political participation are more likely to experience a state takeover, as well as the most punitive forms of state takeovers. Increases in state and federal funding for school districts also correlate with a higher possibility of a state takeover.
