= Mount Houston, Texas =

Community in north central Harris County, Texas

Coordinates: 29°53′28″N 95°18′21″W

Mount Houston is a community in north central Harris County, Texas. It is east of U.S. Highway 59, near the Dyersdale oil field.

Mount Houston was established along the Houston, East and West Texas Railway. At that time it was 10 miles (16 km) away from Houston. A post office opened in 1910. In 1914 Mount Houston had 100 people. It featured several market gardeners. It included two churches, a sawmill, and a lumber company. The post office closed in 1918. By the 1980s Mount Houston did not significantly increase in size. Within 1 mile (1.6 km) of Mount Houston, three schools and three churches had been established.

== Education ==
Mount Houston is within the Houston Independent School District. North Forest High School is the sole zoned high school.

Until July 1, 2013, North Forest Independent School District was named the East and Mount Houston Independent School District.
