= Scenic Woods, Houston =

Neighborhood of Houston, Texas

Coordinates: 29.8608°N 95.3008°W

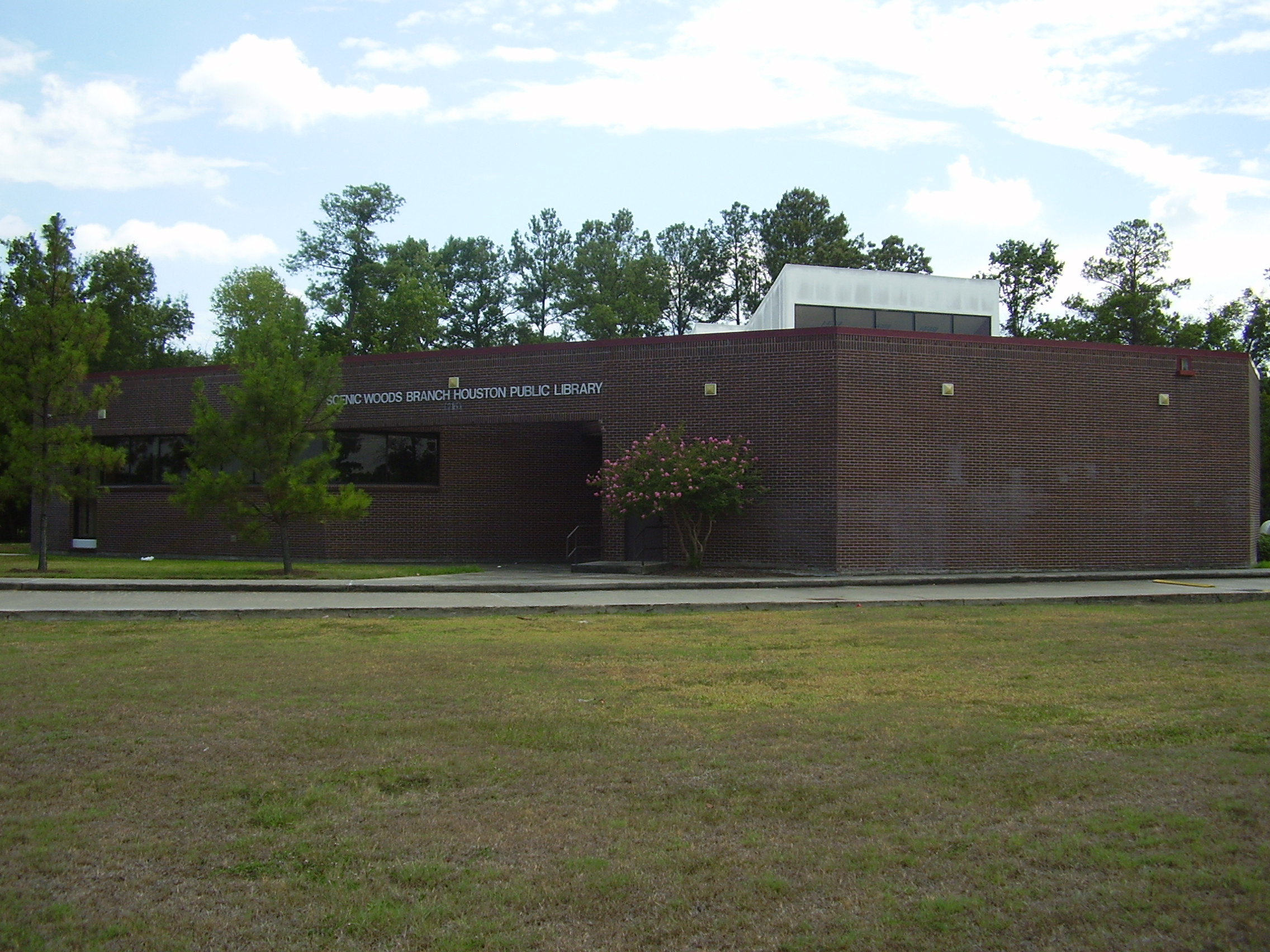
Scenic Woods Neighborhood Library

Scenic Woods is a neighborhood located in northeast Houston, Texas, United States, near Homestead Road and Parker Road. The community is populated by working class African Americans. The community is a quiet family oriented place with manicured lawns and well maintained homes.

Scenic Woods is a traditionally African-American neighborhood. Fontaine Place adjoins Scenic Woods.

== History ==
In 2001, Kinsel Industries Inc. of Houston won the contract for a sewer upgrade project in the Scenic Woods area with a low bid of $1.8 million. It was to perform manhole repairs and overhaul 6 inch through 12 inch sanitary sewer lines. The project area was bounded by Mount Houston to the north, Hirsch Road on the west, Sultan Drive on the east, and Ley Road to the south. According to Robert Stanton of the Houston Chronicle, Carol Mims Galloway, a member of the Houston City Council, "was instrumental in steering the project to Scenic Woods".

== Government and infrastructure ==
The Fontaine-Scenic Woods Civic Club and the East Houston-Settegast Super Neighborhood Council serve the community.

It is located in Beat 8C60 of the Northeast Patrol Division of the Houston Police Department.

Scenic Woods, as of 1987, was in Houston City Council District B.

== Education ==
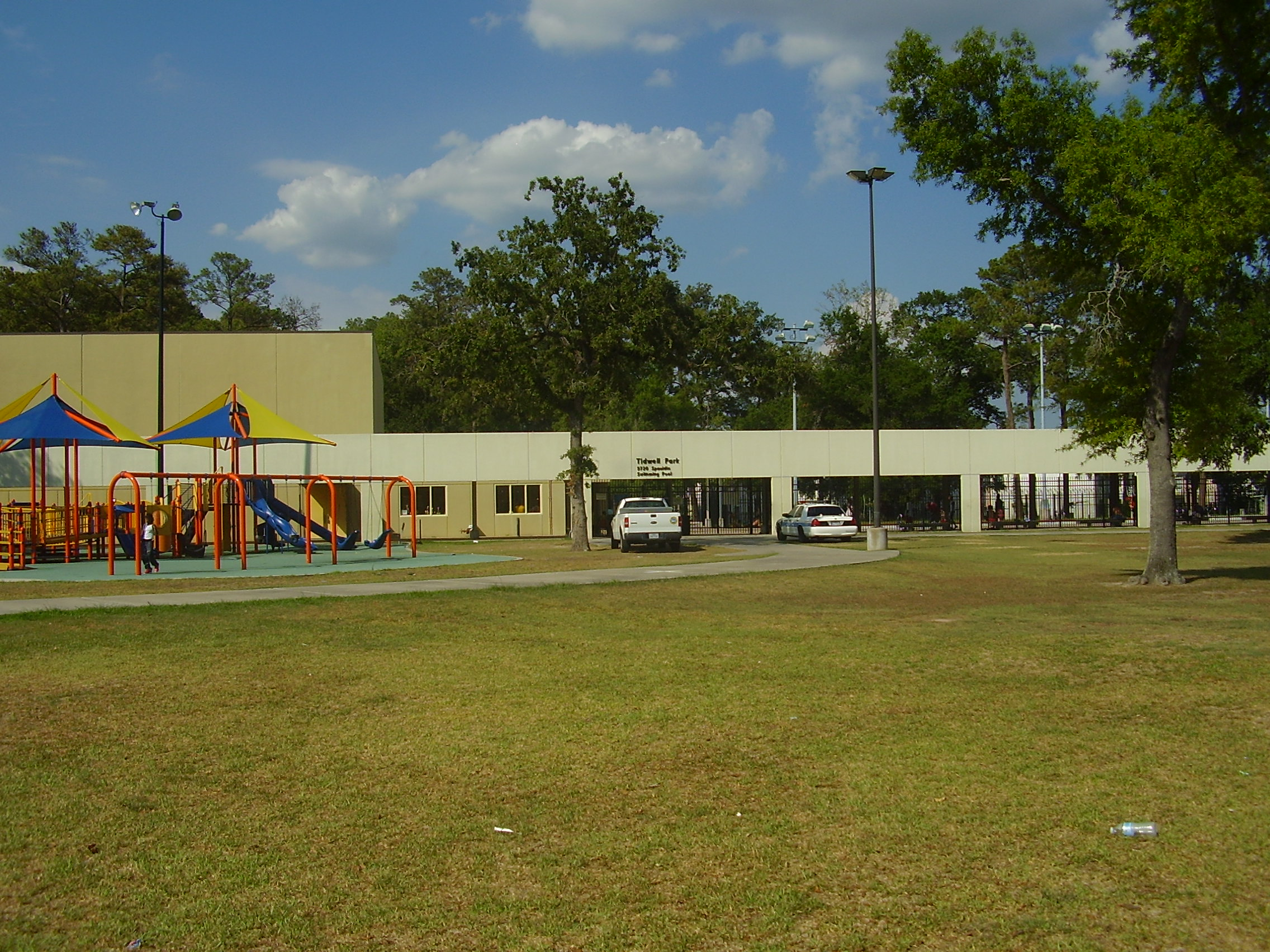
While the Scenic Woods Library was under renovation, a temporary library was installed in Tidwell Park

Children in the neighborhood attend schools in the Houston Independent School District. They previously attended schools in the North Forest Independent School District, until it merged into HISD on July 1, 2013. The proposed attendance boundaries for the 2013-2014 school year, to be decided upon on July 17, 2013, show the community being zoned to Shadydale Elementary School, Forest Brook Middle School, and North Forest High School.

Fonwood Early Childhood Center, previously Fonwood Elementary School, is in close proximity to the Scenic Woods Library. It was built in 1964. It became an early childhood center when NFISD merged into HISD on July 1, 2013.

=== Public libraries ===
The 11,000-square-foot (1,000 m^{2}) Scenic Woods Regional Branch Library of the Houston Public Library serves the community. It was built in 1986.

In October 2002, the permanent library building closed for a routine renovation. The renovation included replacing the furniture and service desk and upgrading restroom facilities. Upon discovery of the roof requiring to be replaced and mold behind the wallpaper, the re-opening was delayed and rescheduled to March 31, 2005. A 200-square-foot (19 m^{2}) temporary replacement facility was established at Tidwell Park, in a room half the size of a standard American classroom in the park's community center. The temporary library had about 600 books, videos, and CDs, including one set of encyclopedias. Sandra Fernandez, HPL's public relations manager, said that technical complications prevented the installation of computers and telephones. As of December 18, 2003 it received four computers connected to telephone lines, giving them internet access. Heather Saucier of the Houston Chronicle said that because the library was so small, many area residents complained. They argued it was too small to effectively serve the area while the permanent library was renovated. In 2003 many residents complained, citing a lack of signage, the small space, the limited amount of reference material, and the initial lack of computers and telephones. Effie Hackett Williams, the president of the Fontaine-Scenic Woods Civic Club, said that the branch was too far from the park's parking lot and "not convenient for everybody". Jackie Tolbert, the director of public relations of the North Forest Independent School District (NFISD), said that the school administrators considered expanding hours at Kirby Middle School because the hours of the temporary library did not easily accommodate NFISD students.

Since the Lakewood Branch Library closed temporarily on May 1, 2004, for a period Scenic Woods area residents had to travel to the Dixon Library, the McCrane-Kashmere Gardens Library, and the Tuttle Library in Denver Harbor to receive library services. Galloway asked METRO to establish a shuttle from the Lakewood Library to the McCrane Kashmere library, but Chip Lambert, a spokesperson for the Federal Transit Administration (FTA), said that under FTA rules METRO is not allowed to operate charter routes.

The library was closed on June 9, 2007 through June 13, 2007 to receive $107,000 ($166141.07 when adjusted for inflation) worth of repairs funded by a $40 million HPL capital improvement bond and Community development block grants and Housing and Urban Development grants. The HPL director of building services, Issa Dadoush, stated that the repairs were for the air conditioning systems and controls and that renovations were scheduled to be completed on July 30, 2007.

== Parks and recreation ==
Two parks, Scenic Woods Park and Gleason Park, are in Scenic Woods. The Scenic Woods Park is complete with a basketball area, baseball field, walking trail and tennis courts.

The Northeast Family YMCA serves residents of Scenic Woods and Fontaine.

== Notable residents ==
- Shelia Dansby Harvey, author of Bad Girls Finish First and Illegal Affairs
- Slim Thug- Rapper from Scenic Woods.
