= East Houston =

Human settlement in Houston, Texas, United States of America

Coordinates: 29.840°N 95.255°W

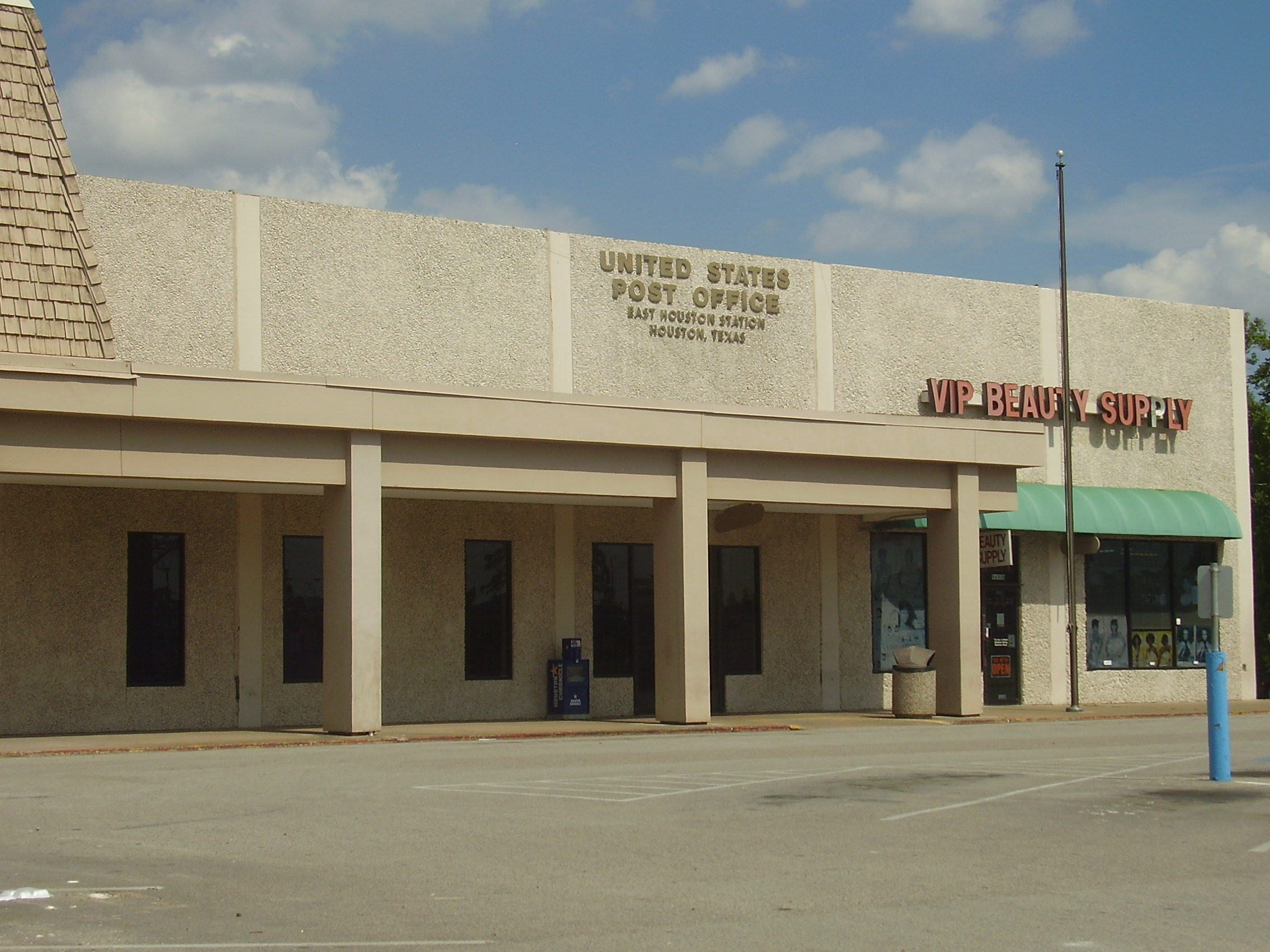
East Houston Station Post Office

East Houston is a community in northeastern Houston, Texas, United States. It is a city-designated Super Neighborhood.

== Government and infrastructure ==
The United States Postal Service operated the East Houston Post Office at 9604 Mesa Drive. The facility is permanently closed.

== Education ==
The Houston Independent School District serves East Houston. North Forest High School is the sole zoned high school.

Until July 1, 2013, North Forest Independent School District served East Houston; that district was formerly named the East and Mount Houston Independent School District.

== Parks and recreation ==
Brock Park, including golf and disc golf facilities, is located in the neighborhood.
