= Forest Brook High School =

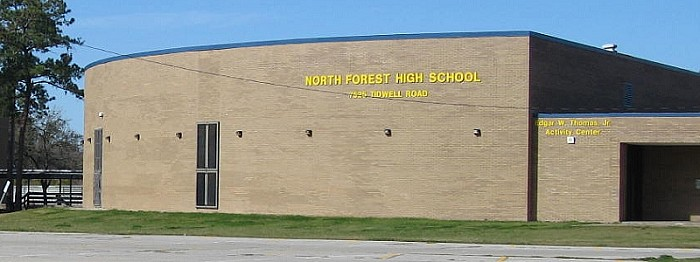
- The former campus of North Forest High School, formerly Forest Brook High School and now Forest Brook Middle School

Location
- 7525 Tidwell Road; Houston, TX 77016; United States
- 29.850318°N 95.293928°W

Information
- Type: Comprehensive Public High School
- School district: North Forest Independent School District
- CEEB code: 443377
- Grades: 9–12
- Website: classroom.northforestschools.org/webs/forestbrook/

Forest Brook High School was a high school located at 7525 Tidwell Road in Houston, Texas, United States. Serving grades 9 through 12, Forest Brook was a part of the North Forest Independent School District. It is now the site of Forest Brook Middle School, now under the control of the Houston Independent School District.

A brook runs through the campus.

== History ==
Forest Brook was built in 1972 and opened on August 2, 1972. It was intended to accommodate black students after the district was required by the state to integrate.

In June 2001 Tropical Storm Allison damaged Forest Brook High School and NFISD officials temporarily closed the school. District officials wanted to put the children on the campus of M. B. Smiley High School. NFISD residents protested the plan. Some argued that because Forest Brook and Smiley were rivals, putting the students on the same campus would lead to incidents. On July 19, 2001 district officials announced that they would move Forest Brook students to B. C. Elmore Middle School until Forest Brook was repaired.

During the 2001–2002 school year, Forest Brook had 1,206 students. It had a capacity of 2,750 students. This gave the school a 44% classroom usage rate.

On July 20, 2007, some teenagers vandalized the school with a water hose. The water was left on for several hours, causing part of the floor to collapse. The library and a number of rooms and hallways were damaged.

After the vandalism of Forest Brook High School, North Forest ISD decided to merge Forest Brook's population into M. B. Smiley High School for at least four months, until Forest Brook was repaired. Some parents and observers criticized the decision, fearing territorial rivalries would cause tension between Forest Brook and Smiley students. Two former students from Forest Brook were later arrested. One, a pitcher and outfielder for the school baseball team who was set to attend Texas College, was charged with criminal mischief in excess of $250,000, a first-degree felony, and was placed on a $999,999 bail. State District Judge Denise Collins reduced the bail to $50,000. The other was his 16-year-old brother. Forest Brook re-opened in the spring.

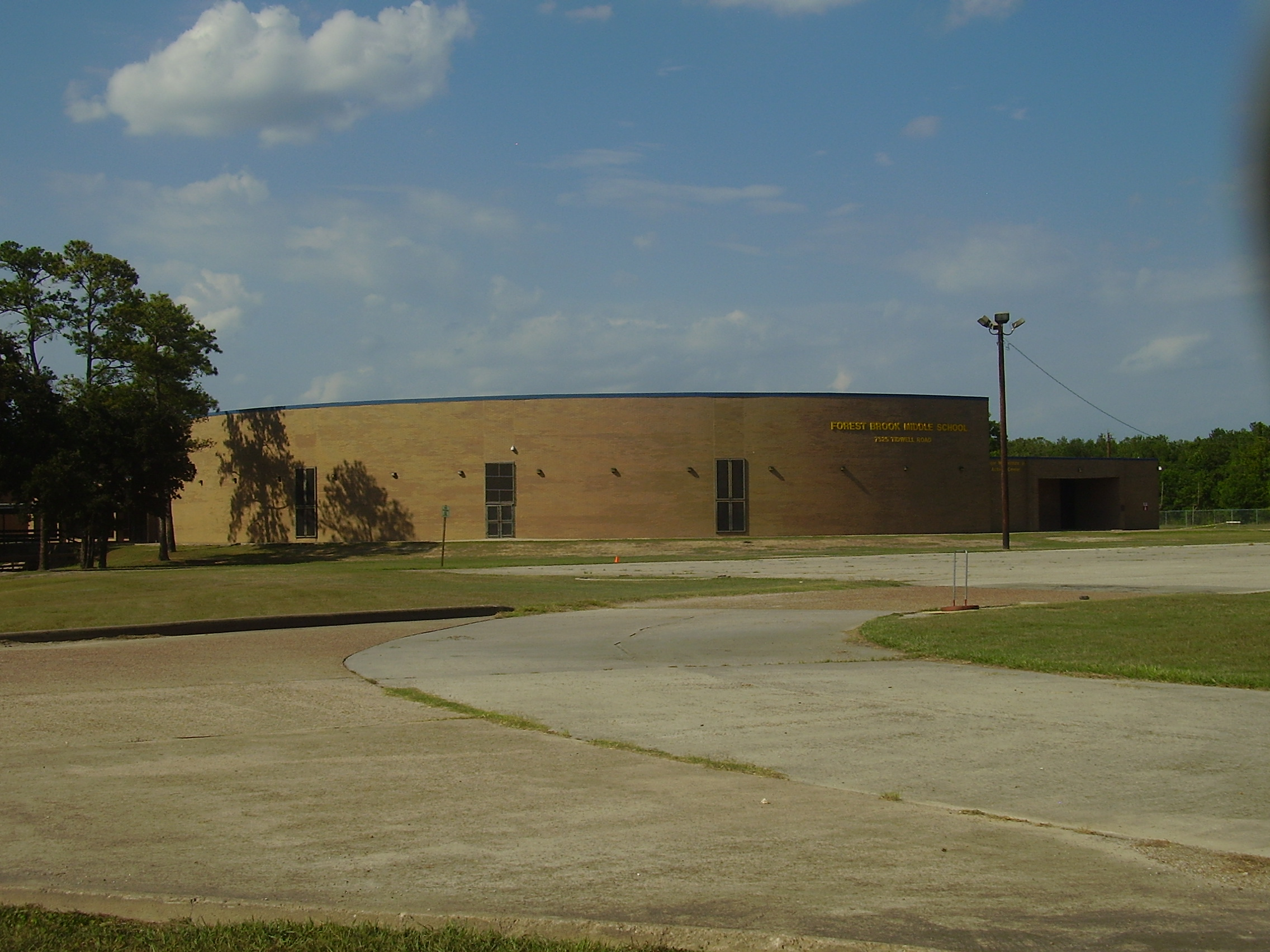
Forest Brook Middle School

The Dallas Morning News wrote a July 21, 2007 article explaining cheating at Forest Brook. The Texas Education Agency (TEA) declared the school to have had no cheating based on scores from 2006 and earlier. When TEA monitors were placed at Forest Brook, test scores decreased.

In 2007 Johns Hopkins University referred to Forest Brook as a "dropout factory" where at least 40 percent of the entering freshman class does not make it to their senior year.

In March 2008 North Forest ISD announced that it would consolidate its two high schools. The new school, located on the Forest Brook location, was named North Forest High School. In September of that year Hurricane Ike hit Houston and Forest Brook received damage. Therefore, the school was relocated to the former Smiley campus The former FBHS campus is now used as Forest Brook Middle School.

== Campus ==
The three-story academic building is divided by a brook from the cafeteria and the Edgar W. Thomas Activity center. The Mark Anthony Wilkins Pavilion, including the basketball gymnasium, weight rooms, and locker rooms has a pond in front.

The campus has baseball fields, an athletic running track, a football field, tennis courts, student and faculty parking lots. The student parking lot doubled as the band practice field in the evenings after classes.

== Notable alumni ==
- Jason Bourgeois, baseball player
- Cornelius Brown, footballer
- Willie D (William James Dennis), rapper
- Damon Gibson, footballer
- Ronald Humphrey, football player
- Mike Jackson, baseball pitcher
- Johnny Jolly, footballer
- Adrian Mayes, footballer
- Jimmy Saddler-McQueen, footballer
- Lawrence Vickers, footballer
