= Dyersdale, Texas =

Unincorporated community in Texas, US

Coordinates: 29°53′30″N 95°15′28″W

Dyersdale is an unincorporated community in Harris County, Texas, United States.

The name originates from Clement C. Dyer, one of the "Old Three Hundred" of Stephen F. Austin's colonists.

A post office opened in 1913. In 1914 the community, with 250 residents, had a lumber company. The post office closed in 1917. An oilfield opened in the mid-1930s. In 1936, the community had scattered residences and a school. By 1946, the oilfield was still in production. In the 1980s, Dyersdale had an abandoned railroad station, a church, and a trailer park.

== Education ==
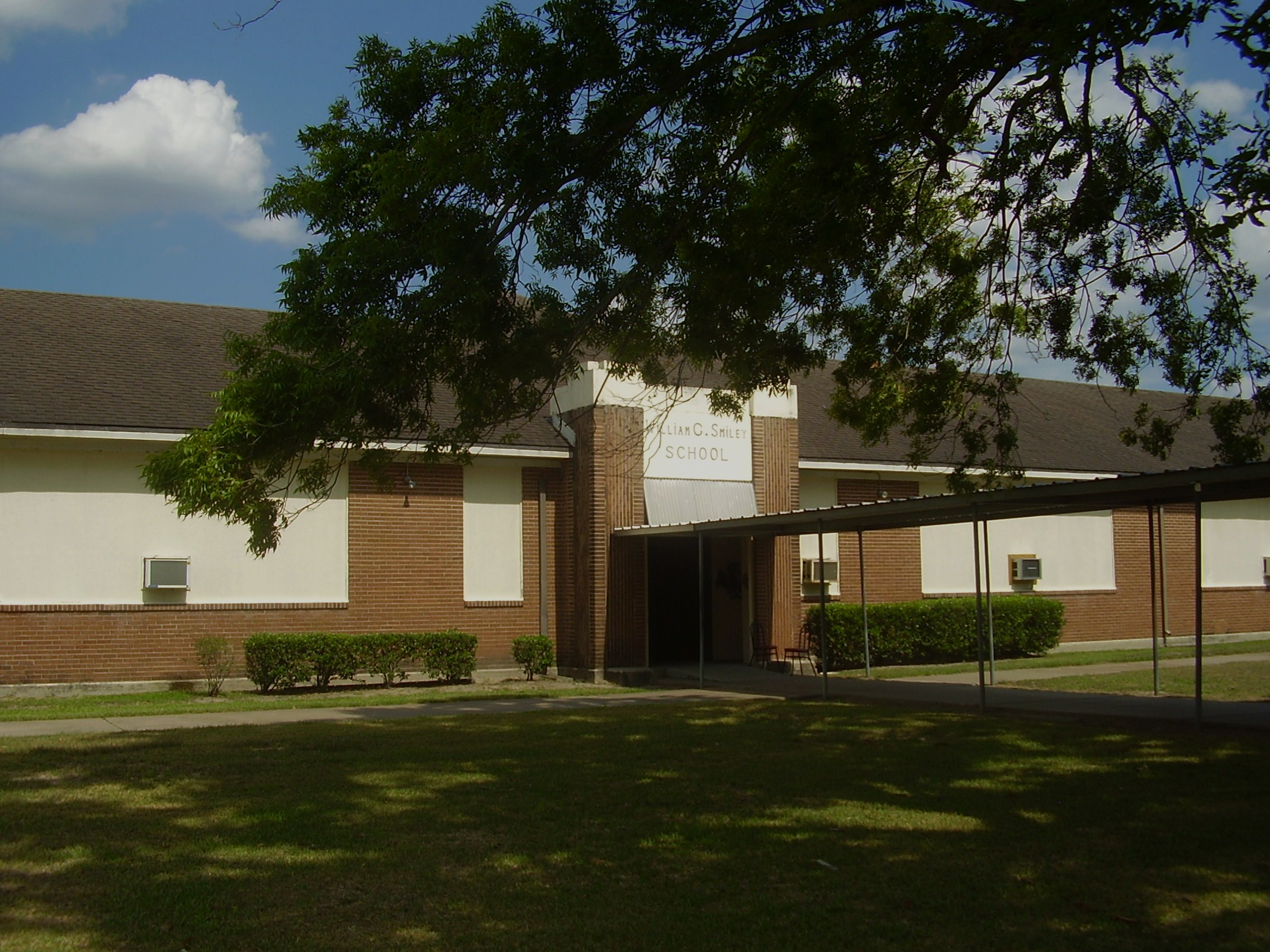
William G. Smiley School

Dyersdale is zoned to schools in the Houston Independent School District. Until July 1, 2013 it had been zoned to schools in the North Forest Independent School District. North Forest High School is the sole zoned high school.

By 1936 the William G. Smiley School had been established.
