= Wilmer-Hutchins High School =

Location
- 5520 Langdon Road; Dallas, Texas 75241; United States; 32.656216°N 96.729933°W

Information
- Type: Public high school
- Established: 1928
- School district: Dallas Independent School District (2011-); Wilmer-Hutchins Independent School District (1928-2005)
- Faculty: 63.78 (FTE)
- Grades: 6-12
- Enrollment: 949 (2023-2024)
- Student to teacher ratio: 14.88
- Colors: Royal blue, Columbia blue and white
- Team name: Eagles
- Website: www.dallasisd.org/wilmerhutchinshs

Wilmer-Hutchins High School (nicknamed "The Hutch") is a public secondary school in Dallas, Texas. A part of the Dallas Independent School District, Wilmer-Hutchins High was formerly part of the now defunct Wilmer-Hutchins Independent School District.

Located at 5520 Langdon Road in far South Dallas, the 9-12 campus serves portions of Dallas, most of Hutchins, Wilmer, a small portion of Lancaster, as well as unincorporated areas in southeastern Dallas County.

== History ==
Wilmer-Hutchins High School was originally established in 1928, after four smaller school districts consolidated. A new $60,000 campus was built on Highway 75 (Now I-45), midway between Wilmer and Hutchins. The building was expanded in the 1950s with the addition of a large gymnasium and an annex housing a junior high school.

The Wilmer-Hutchins district's population grew rapidly in the 1950s and 1960s as hundreds of black families moved into new home developments located in the Dallas portion of the district. However, none of their children attended the high school as it was designated a "whites only" school because of segregation. Black high school students were bused to Lincoln High School in Dallas until 1964, when Wilmer-Hutchins opened John F. Kennedy High School and Milton K. Curry Junior High School in the northern portion of the district.

The school district was forced by courts to integrate in 1968. Kennedy High School was closed after only four years (it was combined with its sister campus to form Kennedy-Curry Junior High School) and all high school students attended WHHS. White families began fleeing the district, and by 1972 the school's population was almost 100 percent black.

In 1983, a new campus was built on Langdon Road in Dallas, north of Hutchins and closer to most of the student body. The old campus became C.S. Winn Junior High School, which was later used as an elementary school before being abandoned in the early 2000s.

The school won the 1990 Class AAAA state football championship.

From 1991 to 1996 the school had six different principals. In August 1995 the school district hired 60 new teachers for the school. By October 1996, 20 of those teachers hired remained.

In 2004 the school closed since a rainstorm damaged the roof and the district was unable to get the problem fixed in a timely manner. Mark Dent of The Dallas Morning News wrote that WHISD's "inability to pay for repairs exposed its financial deficits and ineptitude." In 2004 the WHISD school board voted to close Wilmer Hutchins Performing Arts High School. Students were moved to Wilmer Hutchins High in January 2005. In 2005 WHISD closed. The Dallas Independent School District (DISD) took over WHISD's boundary. Wilmer-Hutchins High School closed, and the entire senior class of Wilmer-Hutchins High School attended South Oak Cliff High School. Ron Price, a member of the DISD board of trustees, preferred that the seniors attended Madison High School, but the WHISD seniors preferred South Oak Cliff since it was closer to their residences. In a telephone survey most seniors said that they would prefer staying together in one school rather than being divided across many schools based on the locations of their residences. The other high school classes were divided between South Oak Cliff, David W. Carter High School, A. Maceo Smith High School, and Franklin D. Roosevelt High School. The high school stayed closed for six years. When DISD took over WHISD schools in 2005, DISD was unable to use bond funds to renovate Wilmer Hutchins High, and would have had to have used its own general operating budget to do so.

DISD planned to convert the former Wilmer Hutchins campus into a magnet school. In 2008 police, acting on a tip, entered the closed school building and found plants which they believed to be marijuana plants in a classroom.

At the time of the district's closure, the WHHS campus (then only 22 years old) was in extreme disrepair. DISD heavily remodeled the WHHS campus, using funds from a $1.35 billion bond. The district completely renovated the auditorium, the career education building, and the interior. The school district enclosed the plaza entrance and added air conditioning and geothermal heating systems.

Six years after WHISD closed, the school re-opened as a Dallas ISD school in 2011. It absorbed students from A. Maceo Smith, which became a technology magnet school in fall of 2011. The majority of remaining students from Smith went to Wilmer-Hutchins. In addition to taking territory from Smith, WH High School also took territory from Carter, Roosevelt, and South Oak Cliff.

In April 2012 Marion Brooks, the principal, said that children zoned to 22 other schools, including some schools not within DISD, are attending Wilmer-Hutchins Schools.

== Extracurricular activities ==
=== American football ===
Wilmer-Hutchins has made 20 American football playoff appearances, winning the 1990 Class AAAA State Football Championship by defeating Austin Westlake 19-7 at Floyd Casey Stadium in Waco, Texas on a bitterly cold day with temperatures in the teens and a sub-zero windchill.

Following the 2000 UIL realignment that moved Wilmer-Hutchins from Class AAAA to Class AAA, the Eagles were one of the dominant Class AAA teams in the state for five years until Wilmer-Hutchins ISD ceased operations.

When in 2011, a newly constructed Wilmer-Hutchins High School campus opened as part of the Dallas Independent School District, a majority of the football team members from A. Maceo Smith High School transferred to Wilmer-Hutchins and helped reestablish the Eagle football program.

The first home game for the new Eagle football team was on August 26, 2011 against the Moisés E. Molina High School Jaguars.

=== Band ===
The Wilmer Hutchins Band is also known as the "Marching Music Machine".

== School enrollment (1988-2005, 2019-present) ==
- 1988-89 - 1,104 students
- 1989-90 - 1,045 students
- 1990-91 - 948 students
- 1991-92 - 934 students
- 1992-93 - 938 students
- 1993-94 - 918 students
- 1994-95 - 973 students
- 1995-96 - 994 students
- 1996-97 - 861 students
- 1997-98 - 754 students
- 1998-99 - 747 students
- 1999-00 - 735 students
- 2000-01 - 693 students
- 2001-02 - 687 students
- 2002-03 - 684 students
- 2003-04 - 744 students
- 2004-05 - 669 students

The ethnic composition of students in the 2019-2020 school year was 56% African American, 40% Hispanic, 2% White, and 2% others, including Asian and Multiracial. Of the 914 students, 675 (74%) were considered economically disadvantaged, 123 (14%) were considered special needs, 55 (6%) were enrolled in gifted and talented programs, and 238 (26%) were limited English proficiency.

== Student performance ==
Wilmer-Hutchins High Schools's performance on the Texas Assessment of Academic Skills (TAAS), a state standardized test used from 1991 to 2003, was generally at or below state standards. The school received the rating of "acceptable" on six occasions (1993–94, 1995–96, 1997–98, 2000–01, 2001–02, and 2002–03) and the state's worst rating of "low performing" four times (1994–95, 1996–97, 1998–99, and 1999-00).

A new standardized test, the Texas Assessment of Knowledge and Skills (TAKS) was introduced in 2003. WHHS received a rating of "academically acceptable" for the 2003-04 school year and "academically unacceptable" for the 2004-05 school year. This was due to lower than acceptable passing rates on the test in Reading ("All Students" category and 1 of 3 analyzed subgroups) and Mathematics ("All Students" and all 3 analyzed subgroups).

== Incidents ==
=== April 2024 shooting ===
On April 12, 2024, a 17-year-old male student shot a student in the leg inside a classroom shortly after 10:30 AM CDT (UTC-5) and injured him. After shooting the student, a teacher was able to direct the armed student out of the school and prevent further injuries. The suspect, identified as Ja'Kerian Rhodes-Ewing, shot the student for allegedly beating him up the day before. The Dallas Independent School District (Dallas ISD) police chief Albert Martinez alleged that Rhodes-Ewing was allowed into the school with the gun because of human error as there is a metal detector at every entrance, and that a malfunctioning metal detector, which was present at the school, was not being used at the time.

In June 2025, Rhodes-Ewing pled guilty to aggravated assault with a deadly weapon and was sentenced to 5 years in prison.

=== April 2025 shooting ===
On April 15, 2025, an armed student arrived in the school's parking lot at 12:56 PM CDT, parked his car, and walked over to a locked side door. At 1:01 PM, another student allowed the suspect, identified as 17-year-old Tracy Haynes Jr., through the side door. Moments after Haynes Jr. was let into the school, he opened fire on a group of male students, wounding four. After shooting them, Haynes Jr. was seen in security footage, attempting to shoot one of the victims point-blank before he fled the school in his vehicle. The victim did not sustain any injuries due to the fact that Haynes' gun jammed. A fifth student was injured in a fall as he attempted to escape the attack, and a teacher received injuries to her face when a stray bullet from the shooter, passed through a wall, entering her classroom and grazing her glasses.

A man, identified as Milton Nieto, encountered Haynes Jr. a few miles away from the school after the attack after he had appeared to have wrecked his car on a railroad and that Haynes Jr. had flagged him down and asked for a ride, saying that he needed to get to his father who was a block away. Nieto agreed to drive Haynes Jr. to a gas station after his story changed mid-drive and claimed that he instead needed to go to an address that someone had sent him. After dropping Haynes Jr. off, he then witnessed Haynes Jr. getting a ride from another person as he was leaving and that after seeing that Nieto called the police to let them know what happened as a precaution. Hours after the shooting, after Dallas ISD officials revealed the suspect was not yet apprehended, Nieto realized that he had helped Haynes Jr. escape and he identified the suspect to the police when they questioned him. Later that same day, Haynes Jr. turned himself in at the Dallas County jail. He is currently charged with aggravated assault mass shooting and has his bond set at $600,000, which was later upgraded to $3.1 million.

Dallas ISD police chief Albert Martinez said that investigators believe Haynes Jr. was part of a dispute with other students and that he had targeted a specific student. Additionally, they were investigating the student who had let the suspect inside the school to determine if the student had known what the suspect intended to do.

== Notable alumni ==
- Rickey Dixon, former NFL football Safety
- Ricky Grace, former NBL player
- Warren Jones, former CFL football quarterback
- Keith LeMon Washington, former NFL football defensive end
- Spud Webb, retired NBA basketball point guard
- Royce West, Democratic member of the Texas Senate
