= Wilmer, Texas =

City in Texas, US

City of Wilmer, Texas
- City
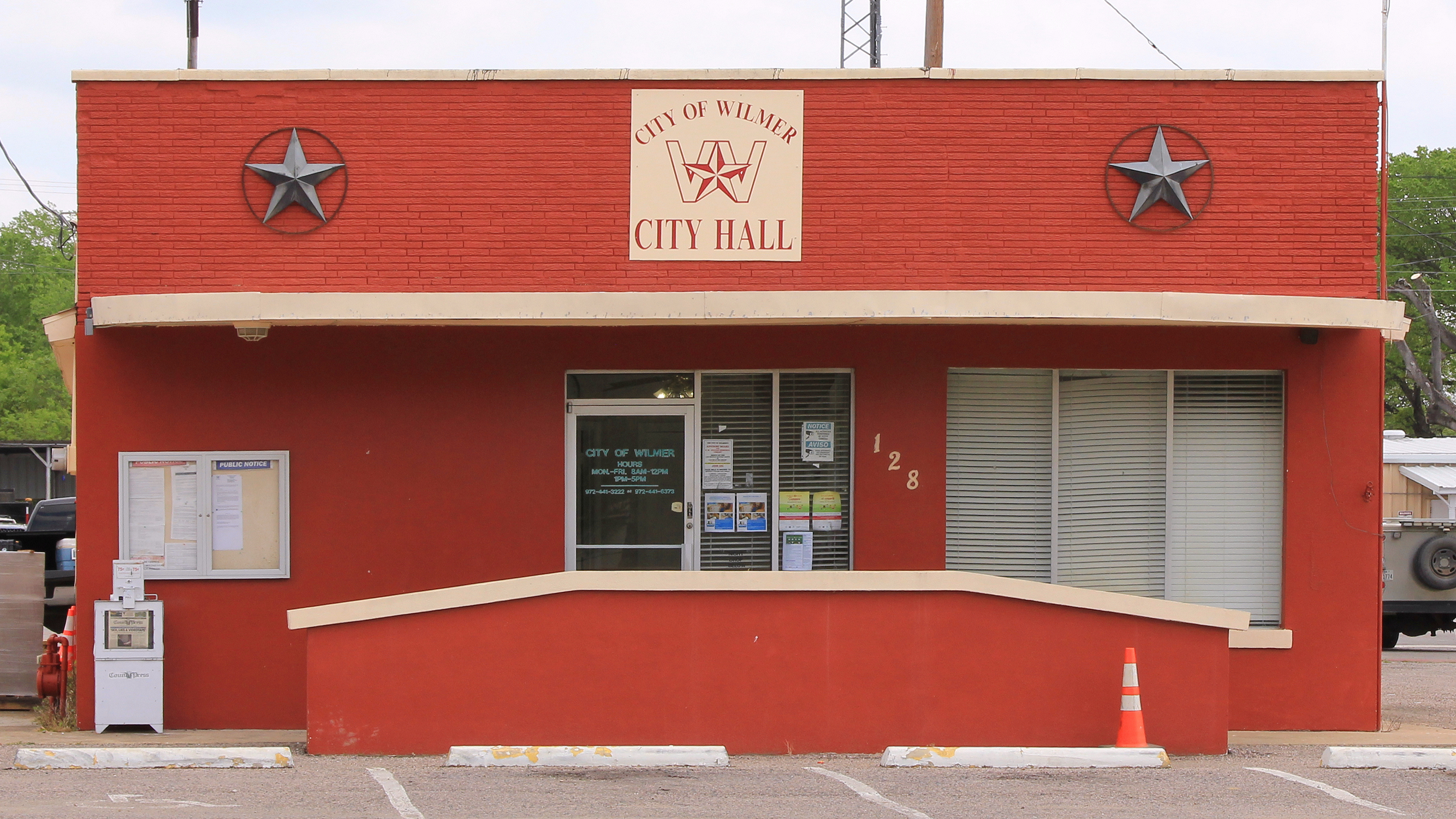
- Wilmer City Hall, April 2018

- Location of Wilmer in Dallas County, Texas
- Coordinates: 32°35′27″N 96°40′57″W
- Country: United States
- State: Texas
- County: Dallas

Government
  - Mayor: Sheila Petta

Area
  - Total: 6.40 sq mi (16.57 km^{2})
  - Land: 6.34 sq mi (16.43 km^{2})
  - Water: 0.054 sq mi (0.14 km^{2})
- Elevation: 466 ft (142 m)

Population (2020)
  - Total: 4,974
  - Density: 784.1/sq mi (302.7/km^{2})
- Time zone: UTC-6 (CST)
  - Summer (DST): UTC-5 (CDT)
- ZIP code: 75172
- Area codes: 214, 469, 945, 972
- FIPS code: 48-79576
- GNIS feature ID: 1350245
- Website: http://www.cityofwilmer.net/

Wilmer is a city in Dallas County, Texas, United States. As of the 2020 census, Wilmer had a population of 4,974. It is part of the Dallas–Fort Worth–Arlington Metropolitan Statistical Area.

== Geography ==
Wilmer is located at 32°35′27″N 96°40′57″W (32.590743, –96.682619). It is situated along Interstate 45 in southeastern Dallas County, approximately 14 miles (23 km) south of downtown Dallas.

According to the United States Census Bureau, the city has a total area of 6.4 square miles (16.7 km^{2}), of which 6.4 square miles (16.5 km^{2}) is land and 0.04 square miles (0.1 km^{2}), or 0.82%, is water.

== History ==
The area was initially settled by Andrew K. Gray before 1850. The settlement was originally known as Prairie Valley when the Houston and Texas Central Railroad arrived in 1872. In 1884, the post office in Prairie Valley was renamed Wilmer, after A.J. Wilmer, a conductor on the Houston and Texas Central line. The population was estimated at 100 in 1890, with several stores and businesses operation in the community. That figure had risen to over 200 by the start of World War I. A fire destroyed most of Wilmer's business district on July 4, 1929. The community's shallow wells were unable to pump the adequate amount of water needed to extinguish the blaze.

Wilmer incorporated in 1945, and its first mayor, J.H. May, was elected on a platform of installing a water system. At the time of incorporation, Wilmer had 136 homes and a population of approximately 450. In 1949, a volunteer fire department was established and a fire truck was purchased. Around the same time, Wilmer and the neighboring city of Hutchins consolidated their schools. By 1960, Wilmer was home to 1,785 residents. Throughout the latter half of the twentieth century, Wilmer continued to grow, but at a much slower rate than other communities in Dallas County. With 3,393 residents as of the 2000 census, Wilmer is currently one of the smallest incorporated cities in Dallas County.

== Demographics ==
Historical population
Census	Pop.	Note	%±
1950	465		—
1960	1,785		283.9%
1970	1,922		7.7%
1980	2,367		23.2%
1990	2,479		4.7%
2000	3,393		36.9%
2010	3,682		8.5%
2020	4,974		35.1%
U.S. Decennial Census

=== 2020 census ===
As of the 2020 census, Wilmer had a population of 4,974. The median age was 30.8 years. 29.8% of residents were under the age of 18 and 7.9% of residents were 65 years of age or older. For every 100 females there were 98.8 males, and for every 100 females age 18 and over there were 99.7 males age 18 and over.

There were 1,485 households in Wilmer, of which 47.4% had children under the age of 18 living in them. Of all households, 43.3% were married-couple households, 20.0% were households with a male householder and no spouse or partner present, and 29.0% were households with a female householder and no spouse or partner present. About 20.2% of all households were made up of individuals and 6.7% had someone living alone who was 65 years of age or older. The census counted 1,095 families residing in the city.

There were 1,604 housing units, of which 7.4% were vacant. The homeowner vacancy rate was 2.3% and the rental vacancy rate was 8.0%.

97.0% of residents lived in urban areas, while 3.0% lived in rural areas.

Racial composition as of the 2020 census
Race	Number	Percent
White	1,322	26.6%
Black or African American	1,383	27.8%
American Indian and Alaska Native	65	1.3%
Asian	12	0.2%
Native Hawaiian and Other Pacific Islander	10	0.2%
Some other race	1,453	29.2%
Two or more races	729	14.7%
Hispanic or Latino (of any race)	2,691	54.1%

== Economy ==
Union Pacific's Dallas Intermodal Terminal is located partly in the city of Wilmer and partly in the city of Hutchins. The shipping facility, built by AUI Contractors, Prime Rail Interests and Halff Associates, was a 70 million U.S. dollar project. After Union Pacific (UP) chose Wilmer for its global intermodal facility, the City attracted Fortune 500 companies like Unilever, Procter & Gamble, Whirlpool, Ace Hardware and Medline. Wilmer offers easy access to all regional Interstates (I-45, I-20, I-30), U.S. Highways, and both international and general aviation airports (Lancaster, DFW International, Love Field).

Wilmer offers a low tax rate along with incentives that include City Tax Abatements, Economic Development Sales Tax Funds, City of Wilmer Sales Tax – 380 agreements, Triple Freeport Exemptions, State of Texas Programs, Dallas County Tax Abatements, Federal Programs including New Market Tax Credits, and a Foreign Trade Zone (FTZ).

== Education ==
Wilmer is served by the Dallas Independent School District. As of fall 2022 the area is zoned to Eddie Bernice Johnson Elementary School, Kennedy-Curry Middle School, and Wilmer-Hutchins High School.

Dallas County residents are zoned to Dallas College (formerly Dallas County Community College or DCCCD).

=== School histories ===
Wilmer-Hutchins Independent School District used to serve Wilmer. Until the end of the school district, Wilmer Elementary School was located in Wilmer. In addition, Kennedy-Curry Middle School and Wilmer-Hutchins High School in Dallas, then under WHISD control, served Wilmer. WHISD was closed after spring 2005 with official termination in June 2006. After the closure of WHISD property values in the district increased.

From 2005 to 2009 Wilmer was served by various DISD schools. The final 12th grade class of WHISD attended South Oak Cliff High School. Other than that class, from 2005–2006 to 2010–2011, A. Maceo Smith High School served as Wilmer's high school.

Dallas ISD was considering opening a new Wilmer-Hutchins Elementary School building, restoring the Wilmer-Hutchins High School building, and demolishing the Kennedy-Curry Middle School building as part of its 2008 bond campaign. The district was scheduled to Wilmer Hutchins Elementary School in an area within the City of Dallas in 2011. In November 2010 DISD announced that three schools (Wilmer Hutchins ES, Kennedy-Curry Middle School, and Wilmer-Hutchins HS) would open/re-open in the Wilmer-Hutchins area in 2011.

The charter school group Honors Academy previously operated Wilmer Academy, a K–8 school, in Wilmer.

In 2015 the Wilmer Early Childhood Center, located on the site of the former Wilmer Elementary School, opened. A new DISD elementary school in Wilmer, named after Eddie Bernice Johnson, opened in 2020.

== Government ==
The Wilmer City Council is composed of a Mayor and five Council Members, which are elected at large on staggered two year terms. The City Council's policy-making duties include adoption of the annual tax rate, water and sewer rates, annual operating budget, and regulatory ordinances. The City Council appoints the City Administrator, City Secretary, City Attorney, Municipal Judge, and board and commission members. Meeting agendas, public hearings, legal notices, and city ordinances are published in the official newspaper, Ellis County Press.

=== City Council Members ===
- Sheila Petta, Mayor
- Candy Madrigal, Mayor Pro-Tem
- Jeff Steele, Council Member
- Phyllis Slough, Council Member
- Sergio Campos, Council Member
- Melissa Ramirez, Council Member

== See also ==
- List of municipalities in Texas
