= Honors Academy =

American group of state charter schools

Coordinates: 32.9431°N 96.8893°W

Honors Academy Charter School District was a group of state charter schools with its administrative offices in Farmers Branch, Texas, in the Dallas-Fort Worth Metroplex.

== History ==
In June 2014 the Texas Education Agency (TEA) revoked Honors Academy's charter, with funding to end in August that year. The TEA closed the school as part of Senate Bill 2, which targets charter schools that perform poorly in three year periods. Honors Academy exhausted its appeals with the TEA.

The group continued operating as a private school, but it still referred to itself as a charter school on its website. In November 2014 the TEA ordered Honors Academy to stop presenting itself as a public charter school, as this is against the Texas Education Code. The school also failed to give its student records to the TEA. Michael Williams, the TEA commissioner, appointed a board to oversee the closure of Honors Academy.

The Honors Academy charter schools ceased operations effective 12/01/2014. All facilities have been closed. Student records have been recovered by the state of Texas. Final disposition of assets was managed by the state of Texas.

== Schools ==
6–12

- Legacy Academy (Kaufman)

9–12

- Landmark School (Palestine)

K-9

- Creek View Academy (previously Destiny School) (Killeen)
- Quest School (Irving)

K-8

- Pinnacle Academy of Fine Arts (previously Pinnacle School) (Fort Worth)
- Wilmer Academy (Wilmer)

6–8

- Branch Park Academy (Farmers Branch)
