= Johnny Jolly =

American football player (born 1983)

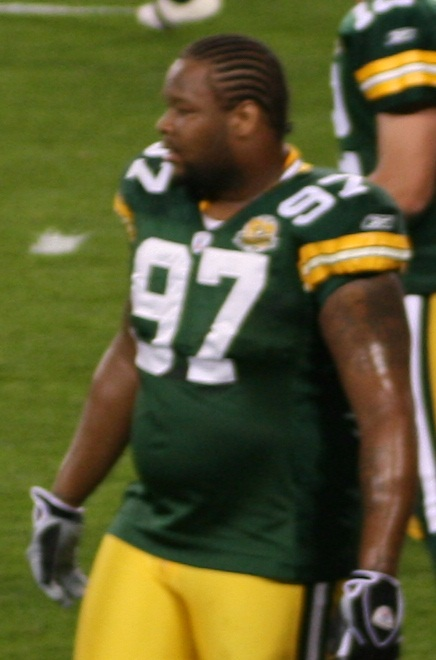
- Jolly with the Green Bay Packers in 2007

No. 93, 97
- Position: Defensive end

Personal information
- Born: February 21, 1983 (age 43); Houston, Texas, U.S.
- Listed height: 6 ft 3 in (1.91 m)
- Listed weight: 325 lb (147 kg)

Career information
- High school: Forest Brook (Houston)
- College: Texas A&M
- NFL draft: 2006: 6th round, 183rd overall pick

Career history
- Green Bay Packers (2006–2013)

Awards and highlights
- Second-team All-Big 12 (2005)

Career NFL statistics
- Total tackles: 135
- Sacks: 3.0
- Fumble recoveries: 5
- Interceptions: 1
- Stats at Pro Football Reference

Johnny Ray Jolly Jr. (born February 21, 1983) is an American former professional football player who was a defensive end for the Green Bay Packers of the National Football League (NFL) in two separate stints: the first, from 2006 to 2009, and the second, in 2013. He was selected in the sixth round (183rd overall) of the 2006 NFL draft, and played college football at Texas A&M.

== Early life ==
During his high school years, Jolly was a three-time all-district defensive lineman at Forest Brook High School in Houston, Texas.

== College career ==
Jolly attended Texas A&M University and became a starting defensive tackle after his breakout 2003 sophomore campaign. In this season, Jolly totaled his collegiate best 95 tackles along with two sacks and eight pass deflections. His success in 2003 resulted in double teams on a weekly basis in his junior and senior seasons. Although his statistics dropped because of this, Jolly was awarded Big 12 all-conference honors for his final two seasons.

His college career is highlighted by what has come to be known as the "Jolly Dance", where, during the fourth quarter of a game in which his Texas A&M team was losing 77–0 to Oklahoma, the Sooners were attempting to run out the clock and end the game by running dive plays over and over into the middle of the line of scrimmage. On one such play, Jolly made a tackle for a loss and briefly celebrated, much to the chagrin of the television announcers and other spectators.

== Professional career ==
Pre-draft measurables
Height	Weight	Arm length	Hand span	40-yard dash	10-yard split	20-yard split	Broad jump
6 ft 3 1/4 in (1.91 m)	317 lb (144 kg)	33 in (0.84 m)	10 3/8 in (0.26 m)	5.43 s	1.83 s	3.15 s	8 ft 8 in (2.64 m)
All values from NFL Combine

=== Green Bay Packers ===
==== 2006–2009 ====
Jolly was drafted by the Green Bay Packers in round six, pick 183 of the 2006 NFL draft.

During his rookie season, Jolly struggled to get much playing time due to their deep defensive tackle rotation early in the season, but managed to get extensive playing time in the final four games of the 2006 season due to injuries of the more experienced players.

However, in his second year with Green Bay, he was promoted to starter in place of Corey Williams. He excelled at the position until becoming injured right before a game against the Dallas Cowboys.

On July 16, 2010, and following his delayed second trial for possession of codeine, he was suspended indefinitely by the NFL.

On February 11, 2011, Jolly began the process of applying for reinstatement. He was under contract with the Packers until the end of the 2011 season.

==== 2013–2014 ====
On February 27, 2013, Jolly was reinstated. On March 11, the Packers restructured Jolly's contract to $715,000. When Jolly was suspended in 2010 for violating the league's substance abuse policy, he had been tendered a $2.521 million contract as a restricted free agent. Since that contract tolled during his suspension, the Packers retained his rights.

On August 17, Jolly continued his solid pre-season against the St. Louis Rams, by tipping a pass that led to an interception and then intercepting a pass in a 19–7 win. On August 31, Jolly officially made the Packers 53-man roster, completing his improbable return to the NFL. Jolly's season was prematurely ended in December 2013 with a neck injury. Jolly had surgery in January 2014. According to his agent, Jack Bechta, the surgery was between the C-5 and C-6 vertebrae. It is generally less severe than fusion surgery higher in the neck, which is the one that led to safety Nick Collins' release and had ended tight end Jermichael Finley's career.

In May 2014, Packers head coach Mike McCarthy said: "I'll say this about Jermichael and Johnny: First and foremost, I just want them to be healthy. And then with that, they're obviously our players and we have strong interest in. We'll see what happens after that." On June 29, Jolly was cleared by doctors, but received no known interest from teams. The Packers publicly stated they "haven't ruled out bringing him back." During the preseason and eventual formation of the 2014 roster, the Packers gravitated toward linemen who were lighter and more agile than Jolly.

=== NFL statistics ===
Year	Team	GP	COMB	TOTAL	AST	SACK	FF	FR	FR YDS	INT	IR YDS	AVG IR	LNG	TD	PD
2006	GB	6	4	4	0	0.0	0	0	0	0	0	0	0	0	1
2007	GB	10	21	13	8	1.0	0	1	0	0	0	0	0	0	4
2008	GB	16	49	36	13	0.0	0	1	0	0	0	0	0	0	2
2009	GB	16	39	24	15	1.0	1	2	0	1	2	2	2	0	10
2013	GB	13	21	11	10	1.0	0	1	0	0	0	0	0	0	1
Career		61	134	88	46	3.0	1	5	0	1	2	2	2	0	18

== Legal issues ==
On July 8, 2008, Houston police arrested Jolly for possession of at least 200 grams of codeine, with intent to sell prescription cough syrup for use in making purple drank, a second-degree felony. He appeared at court on July 22. He became the first Packer since 2000 to stand trial on a felony charge. Charges against Jolly were dismissed in a Texas court on July 16, but were refiled shortly after in December 2009. The dismissal stemmed from police awaiting new equipment that measures codeine amounts.

On July 16, 2010, with trial (oft-delayed) scheduled for the end of the month, the NFL officially suspended Jolly "indefinitely." His agent Dan Thompson had no official comment at the time; however, Jolly's leading defense attorney, Travis Damian, had filed a report with new and updated findings which may lead to a possible acquittal of the "indefinite" league suspension. As a result of being suspended, he missed out on the Packers Super Bowl XLV championship season.

On March 25, 2011, Jolly was arrested and charged with possession of a controlled substance with intent to distribute after police allegedly found 600 grams of codeine in his vehicle. In addition, he was caught driving a car with a suspended license. Jolly was arrested and charged again on October 1, for possession of codeine and tampering with evidence by trying to hide the drug. On November 17, Jolly was sentenced to 6 years in prison for violation of probation in conjunction to his arrest for possession of narcotics.

On May 15, 2012, Jolly was granted early release with a 10-year shock probation.
