= Kendleton Independent School District =

Former school district in Texas

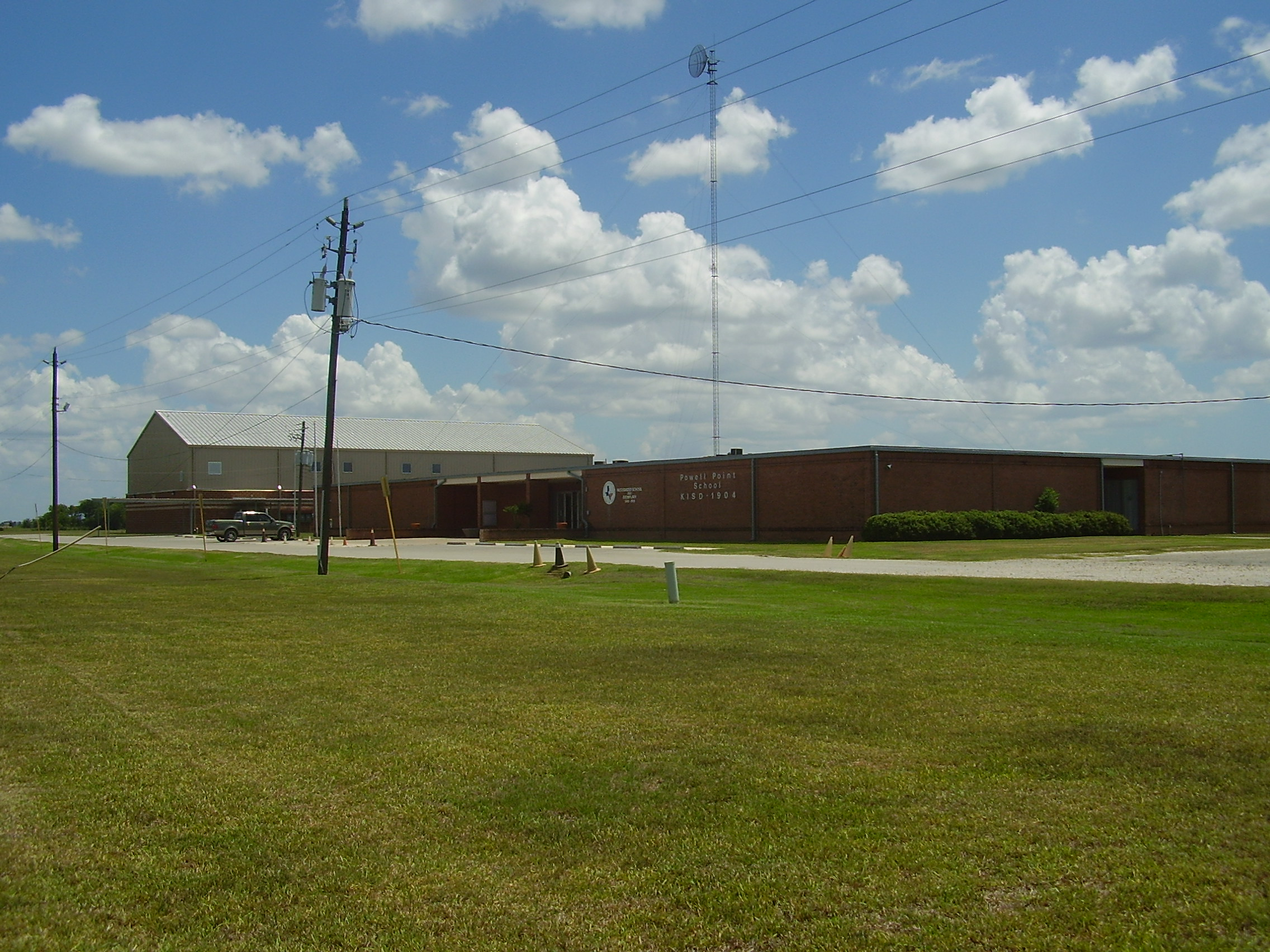
The Powell Point Elementary School building, now used as Powell Point Alternative School

Kendleton Independent School District was a public school district based in Powell Point, unincorporated Fort Bend County, Texas, United States, north of the city of Kendleton. The district served Kendleton and Powell Point. Powell Point is among the oldest historically black schools in the state.

Powell Point School is now being served as an Alternative School for students that have been expelled or Removed from LCISD Alternative Learning Center (ALC)

In 2009, the school district was rated "academically unacceptable" by the Texas Education Agency (TEA). The district closed in 2010, and its area was taken by the Lamar Consolidated Independent School District (LCISD).

The district had one school, Powell Point, which served students in grades pre-kindergarten through six. At the time of closure students already were assigned to LCISD for middle and high school grades.

== History ==
In 1890 Common School District No. 4 opened on the original land grant of Elizabeth Powell, consisting of three area schools built by local African Methodist Episcopal churches. The district was all African-American. In 1903 Tellie B. Mitchell, a Kendleton native who graduated from Wiley College, returned to Kendleton and opened the Powell Point School, a two-room schoolhouse. In 1923 Mitchell persuaded the Rosenwald Foundation into funding the construction of a new school facility with six classrooms, an auditorium, and a library. Mitchell was the principal of the school until 1954.

Beginning in 1985, secondary school students (grades 7-12) from Kendleton ISD attended campuses in the neighboring Lamar Consolidated Independent School District.

In 1995 the Texas Historical Commission established a historical marker at the school site. By that year Powell Point School became an elementary school.

=== Academic performance and closure ===
In the early 1990s the State of Texas forced the members of the school board of Kendleton ISD out of their positions. In 1993 the state warned the district that it could lose its accreditation, and also be merged into another school district, within two years. In 1994, the district was operating by itself and had gained a "favorable" rating from the Texas Education Agency (TEA); it had been doing so for the first time in 12 years.

Kendleton ISD received the state's lowest accountability rating of "Academically Unacceptable" in 2005, 2006, 2007, and 2008. The TEA warned that significant improvements were required to prevent state intervention and closure of the district.

After receiving an "Academically Unacceptable" rating for a fifth consecutive year in 2009, the TEA announced on March 10, 2010 that it had revoked the accreditation of Kendleton ISD due to continued substandard academic performance. After receiving Justice Department approval in May 2010, the district was annexed into the Lamar Consolidated Independent School District and ceased operations effective July 1, 2010.

== Operations ==
Circa 1995 the annual cost per student incurred by the district was $9,237; around that time the average per-student cost in Houston-area school districts was $4,000-$5,000. In 1996 Melanie Markley of the Houston Chronicle wrote that the cost was relatively high due to the small enrollment numbers, as having few students reduces the cost-effectiveness of educating them.

== See also ==
- La Marque Independent School District, a majority black school district in Galveston County closed by the TEA in 2016 and annexed into Texas City ISD
- North Forest Independent School District, a majority black school district in northeast Houston and northeast Harris County closed by the TEA in 2013
- Wilmer-Hutchins Independent School District, a majority black school district in southern Dallas and Dallas County closed by the TEA in 2006
- Non-high school district
