= North Forest Independent School District =

Former school district in Texas

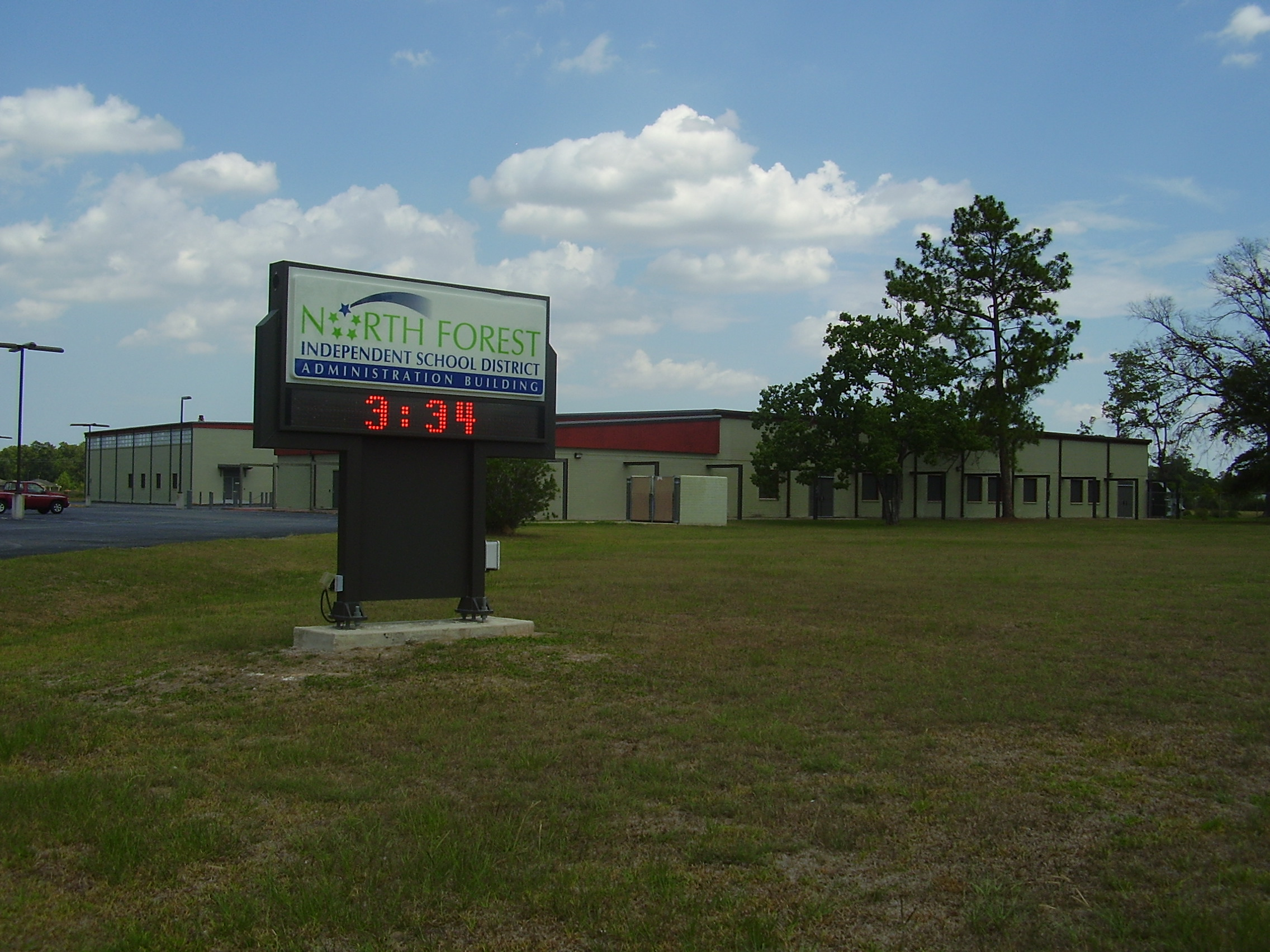
Administration building

North Forest Independent School District (NFISD) was a school district in northeast Houston, Texas. Established in the early 1920s in a low-income white area, it later became majority-black and black-run. The district had a history of financial and academic issues from the late 1980s until 2013. On July 1, 2013, it was closed by order of the state and absorbed into the Houston Independent School District (HISD).

== History ==
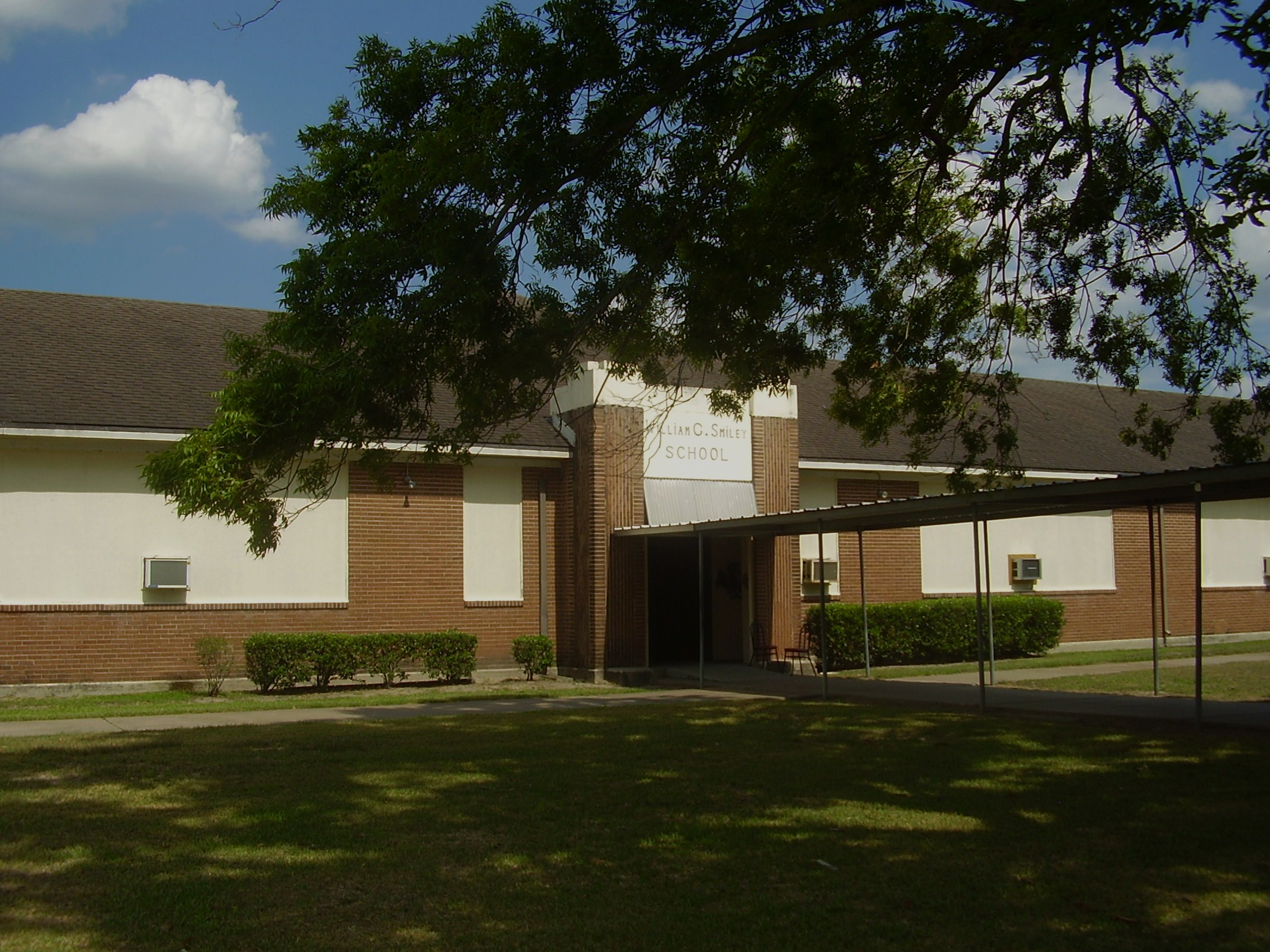
William G. Smiley School - Served as the W.G. Smiley Career & Technology School

The district was established sometime around 1923 as the Northeast Houston Independent School District. It was also named the East and Mount Houston Independent School District. It began with a single school.

The district originally had a low-income rural white population. Schools were segregated until the late 1960s. By the 1970s, when the area was suburban and still mostly white, the state mandated racial integration of schools. African-American families moved to North Forest for the perceived quality of the schools. After desegregation, many white families moved to other communities along U.S. Highway 59, such as Aldine, Humble, and Porter, and African-American families became the majority and gained political control of NFISD. By the late 1970s it was one of the largest black-run school districts in the state; on October 12, 1989, it became the largest.

In the 1970s Billy Reagan, the then superintendent of the Houston Independent School District, considered bringing North Forest into his district, but the Texas Education Agency told him that desegregation laws made it illegal for two minority-population school districts to merge. In addition, area residents wanted to maintain local control of their schools. According to Reagan, he also asked the superintendent of the Humble Independent School District to check whether the state would allow Humble to annex NFISD, but no action resulted.

In 1979 NFISD area residents discovered that a proposed landfill had been misrepresented to them by developers as a housing development. The landfill was about 1,400 feet (430 m) from the NFISD administration building, an NFISD high school, the NFISD sports stadium, and an NFISD track field. At the time the high school did not have air conditioning. Seven NFISD schools were within a 2-mile (3.2 km) radius of the landfill. Residents sued the landfill company in federal court, but lost the suit in 1985. As a result of the case, remedies were passed at the state and municipal levels.

In 1981 the NFISD Police Department was established.

In 1991 voters approved an approximately $40 million NFISD bond, and in 1997 another bond, leading to the construction of four schools. On March 1, 1998, the district issued $46.9 million worth of the approved bonds. It used $5 million to refund older bonds at a favorable interest rate and the remainder to construct B. C. Elmore Middle School, East Houston Intermediate School (now Hilliard Elementary School), Keahey Intermediate School (Marshall Early Childhood Center at the time of NFISD closure), and Shadydale Elementary School. In 1999 voters approved another about $40 million NFISD bond.

In June 2001 Tropical Storm Allison hit Houston, damaging six NFISD schools. Forest Brook High School sustained heavy damage; it, Lakewood Elementary School, and the NFISD district administration building were closed for repairs. The Federal Emergency Management Agency said that it would pay 75% of the damage costs sustained as a result of Allison.

On March 18, 2003, NFISD had a budget of $65 million during that year; about $50 million came from the state and the rest came from property taxes.

On July 20, 2007, teenagers vandalized Forest Brook High School with a water hose. Forest Brook students shared the campus of the district's other high school, M. B. Smiley High School, until Forest Brook re-opened in the spring.

In March 2008 North Forest ISD announced that it would consolidate the two high schools to form North Forest High School and close Tidwell Elementary School, merging it into Hilliard. Pupils formerly zoned to Tidwell started being a part of the Hilliard zone in August 2008.

=== Academic and management troubles ===
From the late 1980s, the district had experienced recurring financial and academic problems. In 1988 the TEA assigned a monitor to NFISD to deal with the school board and the finances; Ericka Mellon of the Houston Chronicle said that the school board was "meddling." On October 12, 1989, the Houston Chronicle printed an article, "North Forest district shows off its 'other' side in tour", about the district trying to create a positive impression in the media. The state again monitored the district in 2001. Ericka Mellon of the Houston Chronicle wrote in 2007: "The story has been the same for years in this small, poor, mostly black school district in northeast Houston: Financial problems, shoddy recordkeeping and low test scores prompt sanctions from the state. Employees get indicted on criminal charges. The school board fires the superintendent. The district might improve some but then falls again." Joshua Benton of The Dallas Morning News wrote the same year: "[i]n many ways, its schools are to Houston what the since-closed Wilmer-Hutchins schools were to Dallas: the ones that were always in trouble." John Sawyer, the head of the Harris County Department of Education, also compared North Forest to Wilmer-Hutchins, another predominantly black school district, which the state had closed.

The district had the highest March 10, 1986 TECAT (Texas Examination of Current Administrators and Teachers) failure rate of any large school district. 25% of the district's administrators and teachers did not pass. In 1997 an editorial appeared with the title "Clouds hover over northeast Houston district again".

Graduation rates, test scores, and financial record keeping improved during the tenure as district superintendent of Carrol Thomas, from 1988 to 1996, but the district began to decline again after he left to become superintendent of the Beaumont Independent School District. In a 2006 article Todd Spivak of the Houston Chronicle described NFISD as "a prime example of how inconsistency can wreak havoc on schools". In the five years before 2006 NFISD had four superintendents, and the TEA had indicated financial and governance problems at NFISD. Dr. Robert Sanborn, the president and CEO of the organization Children at Risk, described the state of affairs as "inexcusable", with both district high schools posting poor state test scores considered to be poor and the lowest SAT scores in the Houston area. Also in 2006 Dan Feldstein of the Houston Chronicle wrote: "By many measures, North Forest ... is a troubled district. Not only is it last in Harris County in SAT scores and passing rates on the TAKS test, but it ranks among the worst in the state." In late 2006 the TEA assigned two teachers to monitor two NFISD campuses that were rated "unacceptable" by the TEA.

A February 2007 report by the Texas Education Agency, based on data from 2005 derived mainly from the testimony of school officials, said that Forest Brook High School had no cheating; however, a statistical analysis of two years of Forest Brook TAKS test scores by The Dallas Morning News in June 2007 which examined two years of scores from Forest Brook revealed patterns that the newspaper considered suspicious. In Spring 2007 state monitors supervised TAKS tests at Forest Brook, and passing rates on 11th-grade TAKS tests declined from 2006. In 2008 outside monitors reported poor management at the district and "security violations" related to TAKS testing.

Also around 2007, the average SAT score of high schoolers in the district, 748 out of a possible 1600, was among the lowest in the state. Eight of the district's 11 schools received the TEA rating "unacceptable." That school year a teacher of "technology applications" did not receive any working computers until March. NFISD was rated "academically unacceptable" by the TEA from 2008 to 2011.

On March 9, 2007, the NFISD board voted 4–3 to terminate Dr. James Simpson, the superintendent. In May, the state ordered the district to reinstate Simpson, saying that he had been denied due process. In November that year the TEA appointed an academic overseer to monitor the district; the TEA had sent a financial overseer in March. On January 23, 2008, the trustees voted to rehire Simpson. On January 28, the Houston Chronicle reported that an independent auditor had told the trustees that the district was close to bankruptcy, and three days later that the TEA had investigated the district for possible illegality in the use of construction funds for general purposes. On February 4, a trustee requested to change his "Yes" vote for re-instating Simpson to a "No". The TEA denied the district's decision to reinstate Simpson. In March that year, the Northeast Education First community group asked for the state to fire the school board; Governor Rick Perry denied the request. On March 26 the district stated that it would lay off 90 teachers to try to reduce its budget crisis. The TEA estimated that the district would have a $17 million debt by August 2008.

On July 31, 2008, Wayne Dolcefino of ABC 13 KTRK in Houston reported on a several months' investigation of the school district for malfeasance. His discoveries included misappropriation of federal grants by the Special Education Director, Dr. Ruth Watson, who had subsequently been reassigned by the board while retaining her full salary, and that the Vice President of the Board of Education for NFISD, Allen Provost, had a personal relationship with one of the special education teachers.

From 2008 to 2011, North Forest ISD was consistently ranked "academically unacceptable" by the Texas Education Agency. It was placed on probation in June 2008, and on July 31 the TEA dismissed the school board, which was approved by the state on October 15. The TEA stated that in the year leading to July 2008 the district did not meet payroll and that several banks had denied the district short-term bridge loans. The board members decided to appeal in the federal courts.

Because of the issues, many parents in the NFISD area enrolled their children in state charter schools or moved out of the district area. Senfronia Thompson, a Texas House of Representatives member serving portions of the NFISD area, pointed out in 2013 that in the early 2000s state laws had been changed, making it easier for the state to close poorly performing school districts, such as Wilmer-Hutchins and the Kendleton Independent School District. Chris Tritico, a lawyer representing North Forest, accused the state of only trying to annex black-populated school districts.

=== 2011-2012 shutdown attempt ===
On July 8, 2011, the TEA announced that North Forest High School and North Forest ISD would receive an "Academically Unacceptable" rating and the district would be assigned a "Non-Accredited-Revoked" accreditation for the school year 2011-2012 and was to be closed by July 1, 2012. The state said that the Houston Independent School District would absorb the NFISD territory. Paula Harris, president of the HISD board, said that HISD did not advocate for the outcome, but that it would be willing to accommodate the students. Paul Bettencourt, the Harris County tax assessor-collector and later a member of the Texas State Senate, said that a handover to HISD would be beneficial for the NFISD students. An editorial in the Houston Chronicle argued that the district ought to be shut down, and that parents in the NFISD region should try to enroll their children in HISD schools, as HISD allows children living in neighboring districts to attend HISD schools tuition-free. The editorial stated that once HISD absorbs the NFISD territory, it ought to begin offering school bus services between the NFISD area and the current HISD territory.

The school district said that it would oppose the closure order. Sheila Jackson Lee, a local congressperson, also expressed her opposition to the closure. Harold Dutton, a member of the Texas House of Representatives, said that the TEA did not do enough to save the district, while Debbie Ratcliffe, the spokesperson of the TEA, said that the TEA could not get NFISD to make sufficient progress. As the new school year began, Ivory Mayhorn, the head of a group campaigning for the salvation of the district, accused the TEA of discriminating against North Forest.

The United States Department of Justice still had to approve the closure. In February 2012, Robert Scott, the TEA commissioner, reconsidered a proposed closure of the Premont Independent School District and decided to let that district stay open for one more year. NFISD officials asked the TEA to also reconsider the closure of their district. In March Scott said he would give NFISD another year to correct its problems. Edna Forte, the superintendent, later said that state officials had nonetheless already made up their minds to have the district closed no matter what gains she made.

=== 2013 shutdown ===
In February 2013, Texas Education Commissioner Michael Williams said that the one-year reprieve was over and ordered the closure of North Forest ISD and recommended its annexation by Houston Independent School District by July 1, 2013. Houston Independent School District board members discussed how a takeover might be implemented; Dianna Wray of the Houston Press wrote: "It seemed as if all nine of them were choosing their words carefully, making it clear they were only following state orders." Gayle Fallon, the Houston Federation of Teachers president, stated that HISD could not publicly accept the district since it would appear greedy, nor could it publicly reject NFISD since it would appear to be racist against black people. Fallon argued that HISD saw an economic advantage to absorbing NFISD.

In March 2013 Harmony Public Schools, KIPP (Knowledge is Power Program), and Yes Prep together presented a plan to have all NFISD schools be charter managed instead of having NFISD merged into HISD. Michael Feinberg, the creator of KIPP, had created this plan. Jackson Lee voiced approval, while Senfronia Thompson, the House representative, and Rodney Ellis and John Whitmire, members of the Texas Senate, expressed reservations. The TEA did not accept the proposal. According to Feinberg, "It seemed the state had a priority in getting rid of a dysfunctional school system at all costs. The state was in Nightmare on Elm Street X, and they didn't want to see Freddy Krueger come back to life again."

On April 29, 2013, the North Forest ISD school board defied a TEA order to fire its teachers in anticipation of its absorption by HISD. Texas Rangers were sent from Austin to investigate. In May 2013, as a preliminary to making its decision, the Justice Department asked HISD for information on how it would integrate NFISD into its school board boundaries. On June 13, 2013, the HISD board voted unanimously to absorb NFISD. That month, an NFISD lawsuit against the TEA was dismissed.

On June 25, 2013, the Supreme Court of the United States overturned several portions of the Voting Rights Act, so that the State of Texas no longer required clearance from the Department of Justice before shutting down North Forest. The following day, U.S. District Judge David Hittner rejected a claim that allowing the closure of NFISD would violate the legal rights of voters from racial and ethnic minority groups. On June 28 the Texas Supreme Court declined to stop the merger, ending the district's final appeal against closure. NFISD officially closed on July 1, 2013.

NFISD was the largest school district ever closed by the TEA. Opinions varied on whether it was a "historically black" district, and therefore also the largest historically black district in the state to be closed; Kimberly Reeves of the Houston Press noted that the district had not been predominately African-American in the segregation era and remained majority white since desegregation, into the 1970s.

=== Post-shutdown ===
In May 2013 HISD held a job fair for NFISD employees. That month non-contract employees received notice that their jobs would end on June 30, 2013. HISD offered bonuses of $5,000 for experienced teachers who were willing to teach at former NFISD schools. Greg Groogan of KRIV said, "There will almost certainly be massive teacher turnover as a consequence of the merger." Jason Spencer, a spokesperson for HISD, said that ultimately 74 of about 500 NFISD teachers were rehired into HISD.

HISD assumed control of all facilities, debts, and liabilities of NFISD, including $60 million in maintenance tax and general obligation debt. Senfronia Thompson said that the assets included a high school and athletic facility scheduled to be built with $80 million in state funds. Spencer said that the district would likely sell any unused property. Debbie Ratcliffe, a TEA spokesperson, said that state officials would ensure that HISD did not have too high of a burden placed on it. In July 2013 the district started a 45-day cleanup effort of NFISD campuses. Terry Grier, the superintendent of HISD, said that the district safety issues at North Forest would require HISD to spend $3 million. The district used TEA funding to renovate the campuses. Isa Dadoush, the former HISD general construction manager, said that the poor condition of the NFISD campuses was proof that the takeover was the best outcome.

HISD began holding summer school for NFISD students, and extended the coverage of its summer free meals program to North Forest. On July 1, 2013, Grier posted a message on Twitter stating that "75 percent of North Forest's school buses were unsafe to drive" and therefore the district was required to tow these buses to a maintenance barn.

Portions of the NFISD attendance zone were added to the Houston Independent School District trustee zones 2 and 8. The next scheduled board election for those two districts was in 2015. Dianna Wray of the Houston Press wrote that "the voters of North Forest have gone from having an entire board elected directly by them to a situation in which they won't have any say in who represents them for the next three years." Silvia Brooks Williams, a former NFISD board member, said that HISD ignored an effort to add two board seats for North Forest and to give NFISD residents their own HISD representatives.

For the 2013–2014 school year, Fonwood Elementary School was repurposed as an early childhood center, and Thurgood Marshall Early Childhood Center and Elmore Middle School were repurposed as elementary schools. Hilliard and Shadydale elementaries were also annexed into HISD, but Lakewood Elementary School was not scheduled to re-open for the 2013–2014 school year. Some existing HISD elementary schools began serving portions of the NFISD area, and the NFISD zone was divided between Forest Brook Middle School and the existing HISD Key Middle School and between North Forest High School and the existing HISD Kashmere High School. YES Prep Public Schools was permitted to continue leasing a school facility.

Classes at HISD-operated NFISD schools began on August 26, 2013. As of October 2013, according to Spencer, HISD had spent $25 million to cover the sudden annexation and renovation costs, and the state intended to cover those costs and give HISD a further $35 million for at least the following five years.

The HISD furniture service department auctioned off items from closed NFISD schools in May 2014.

== Catchment area ==
The NFISD territory covered 33 square miles (85 km^{2}) of land in northeast Harris County, including small parts of northeast Houston (including the neighborhoods of East Houston, Northwood Manor, Dorchester Place, Royal Glen, Fontaine, Scenic Woods, Melbourne Place, Kentshire, Henry Place, Baker Place, Glenwood Forest, Royal Oak Terrace, Houston Suburban Heights, Warwick Place, Chatwood Place, Townly Place, Wayside Village, and Settegast) and parts of unincorporated Harris County, including Dyersdale. The area is about 20 miles (32 km) from Downtown Houston, and south of George Bush Intercontinental Airport. Jan Jarboe wrote in 1986 in Texas Monthly that the district "clings to isolation" despite its proximity to Downtown. Helen Wheatley, who served as the Houston Federation for Teachers staff representative for NFISD, said then that while the community was an "urban area", the NFISD zone "[had] a country feeling to it".

Until its dissolution NFISD was the poorest district in Harris County. During a period when NFISD received $1,711 per student in property taxes, nearby Deer Park Independent School District received $7,021 per student despite having a lower tax rate. As of 2003 the NFISD attendance zone had very little industry. In 2006 the area within NFISD had the lowest property value per student ratio in Harris County, and less than half the average in the state. Within the district, in 2006 the typical single-family house was appraised at $51,106 ($81619.44 when adjusted for inflation). 42 of the 15,637 houses within the NFISD boundaries had an appraised value greater than $200,000 ($319412.35 when adjusted for inflation).

In 2007, of the school districts in urban areas in Texas NFISD had the highest concentration of ex-prison inmates.

== Student body ==
As of 2010, NFISD had 7,410 students. 68.6% of the students were black, 30.8% were Hispanic, .5% were white, and .1% were Asian or Pacific Islander. 100% were classified as economically disadvantaged. At that time the district had more than 1,050 employees.

In 1980 80% of the students were African American. In 1989 the student body consisted of mainly urban working-class people. It was overwhelmingly African American.

In 1996 the enrollment at NFISD began a steady decline. The district had 13,132 students in the 1993–1994 school year and 11,699 in the 2001–2002 school year, an 11% decline over a nine-year period. During the 2001–2002 school year, 2,837 students attended the two NFISD high schools, while their combined capacity was 5,875, giving a classroom usage percentage of 48%. On March 18, 2003, the district had 11,217 students, fewer than the expected 11,650. From 1997 to 2007 the student population decreased by 35%, to below 9,000 students.

== Schools at the time of closure ==
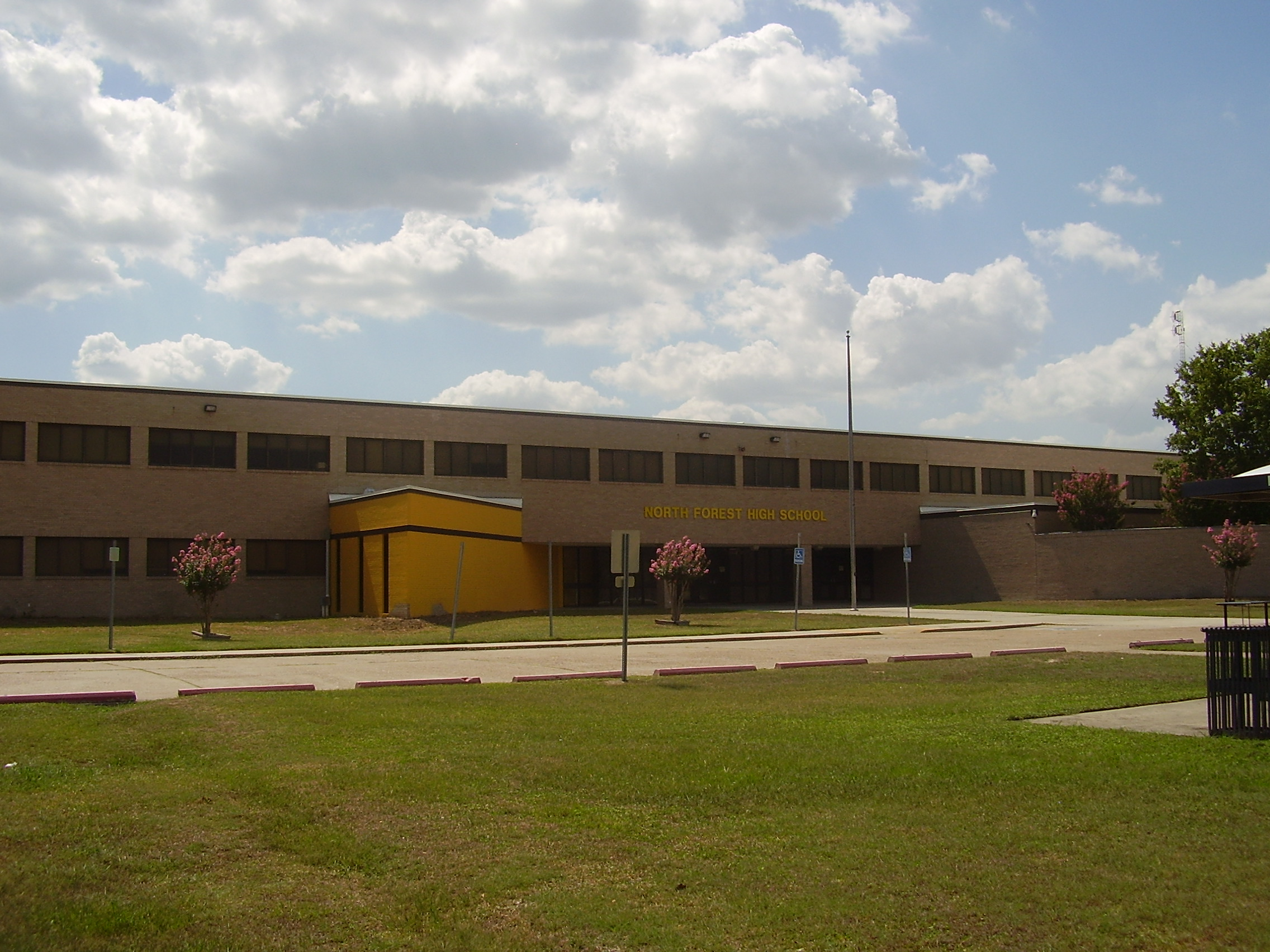
North Forest High School main campus, the former Smiley High School

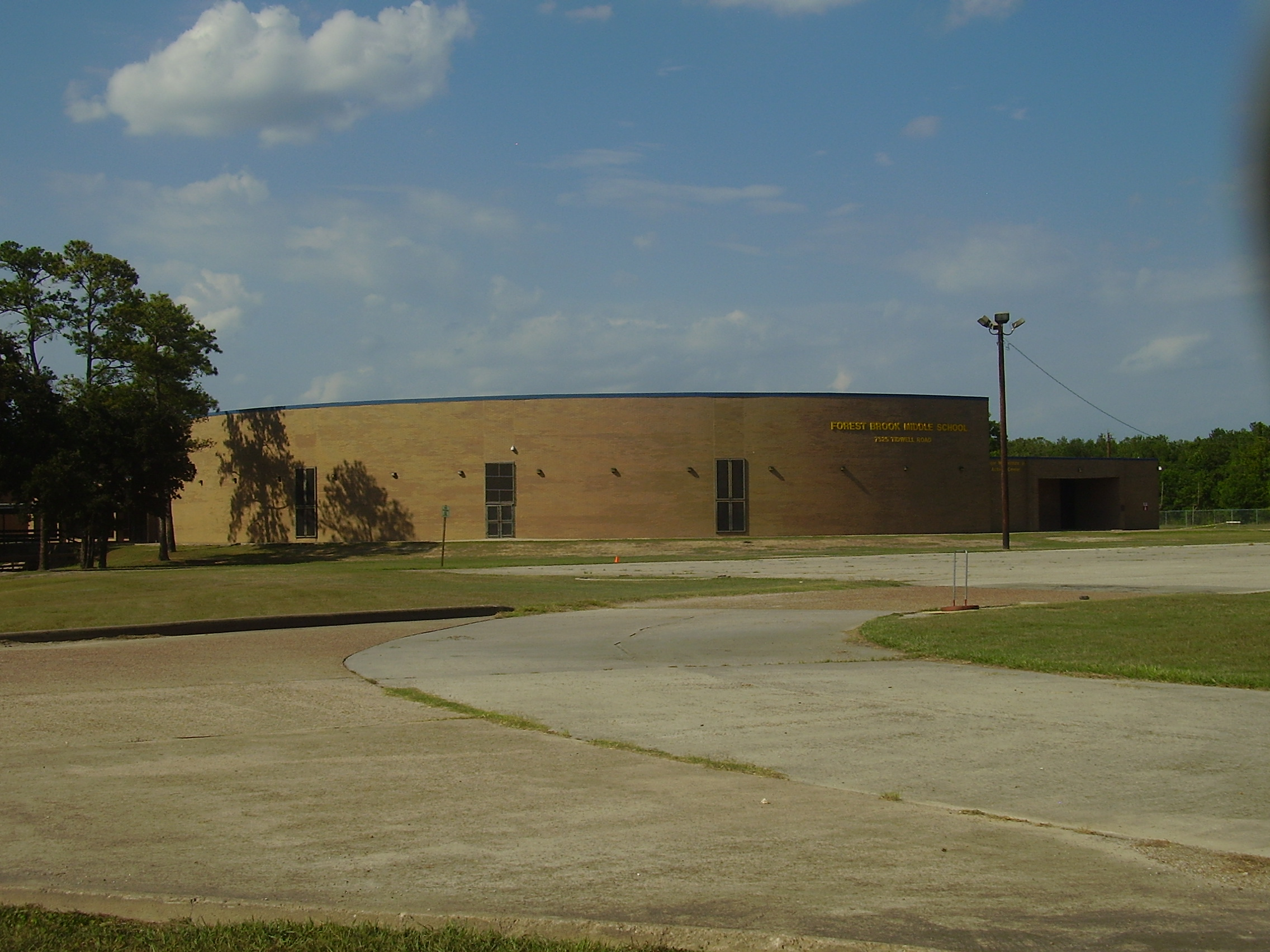
Forest Brook Middle School - the former campus of North Forest High School and Forest Brook High School

In 2011 NFISD operated nine schools. The district's facilities included one early childhood center, five elementary schools, two middle schools, one ninth grade center, one charter school, and one high school.

=== PreK-K ===
- Thurgood Marshall Early Childhood Center - Built in 2000
  - The original Marshall Elementary School was built in 1956. It was rebuilt in 2000.

=== Elementary schools (K-5) ===
- Fonwood Elementary School - Built in 1964.
  - Prior to NFISD's closure, the district had been planning to close Fonwood Elementary. It was one of the older schools of NFISD. In a tour of the campus in July 2013, HISD superintendent Terry Grier noted a playground in poor condition, water fountains too tall for children, exposed wires, violins without strings stored in the music room, and a restroom with a bad odor. The teacher's lounge had a plush couch, upholstered chairs, flowers, and a flatscreen television.
- Asa Grant Hilliard Elementary School - Built in 2000
  - This replaced a 1963 building.
- Lakewood Elementary School - Built in 1962.
- Shadydale Elementary School - Built in 2000

=== Middle schools ===
- Bennie Carl Elmore Middle School - Built in 2000
  - The original 29-classroom building was built in 1957 for $513,113.00. It was named B. C. Elmore High School after Bennie Carl Elmore, a school principal. In 1972, after Forest Brook High School opened, Elmore became a middle school. The district demolished the original building in 1999, replacing it with a 40-classroom, 130,000 square feet (12,000 m^{2}) facility.
- Forest Brook Middle School - Built in 1972
  - This is the former building of Forest Brook High School.

=== High schools (4A) ===
- North Forest High School

=== State charter eligibility ===
In addition to the district-operated schools, NFISD residents were eligible to apply to YES Prep Schools's North Forest campus.

== Former schools ==
=== Former primary schools ===
- East Houston Elementary School (site after renovation became East Houston Intermediate School; the campus now houses Hilliard Elementary School)
- Tidwell Elementary School (school built in 1962, closed after spring 2008)
  - In 2007 students from Tidwell were relocated to Hilliard Elementary School
- Langstead Elementary School (built in 1968; closed as a result of damage from Tropical Storm Allison; later used as a temporary administration building)
  - The building was a converted church, which was valued at $180,000 in 1973 dollars. It served grades K-3, had space for 350 students, and used an "open concept" design.
- W. E. Rogers Elementary School - Built in 1964

=== Former K-8 schools ===
- Settegast Elementary School - Opened 1951 to serve black students. It housed about 300 students, grades 1-8

=== Former intermediate schools ===
- East Houston Intermediate School (built in 2000, the campus is now the site of Hilliard Elementary School)
- Keahey Intermediate School (built in 2000, at the time of closure the campus was the site of Marshall Early Childhood Center)

=== Former middle schools ===
- R. E. Kirby Middle School - School built in 1964
  - Around 2003 the NFISD school board approved building a new Kirby Middle School.
- Northwood Middle School - School built in 1960, closed due to declining enrollment, used for storage in 2003 - During that year the 18.59-acre (7.52 ha) property had a valuation of $7,637,830
- Oak Village Middle School - School built in 1967, later used as 9th grade center for North Forest High School

=== Former high schools ===
- B. C. Elmore High School - Opened in 1957 as a high school. The 29 classroom facility had a cost of $513,113. It was named after Bennie Carl Elmore, who served as the school principal until 1969. After Forest Brook opened in 1972, Elmore became a middle school.
- Forest Brook High School (School built in 1972, opened on August 2, 1972) - Campus now used for Forest Brook Middle School.
- M. B. Smiley High School - School built in 1953, Now used as the main campus for North Forest HS.
- W.G. Smiley Career & Technology School

After spring 2008 the district combined Forest Brook High School and M. B. Smiley High School into North Forest High School, initially located at the Forest Brook campus.

=== Former alternative schools ===
- Learning Academy (age 8-12th grade)
  - At one time, it was located on the B. C. Elmore Campus.

== Headquarters and other facilities ==
The district headquarters at the time of closure was at 6010 Little York Road. One week before the July 1, 2013 closure, the district began removing its items from the headquarters.

The previous district headquarters had opened in 1964. It was damaged in Tropical Storm Allison in 2001; the Texas Comptroller of Public Accounts stated that the 12,000-square-foot (1,100 m^{2}) facility was destroyed as a result of the flood. Langstead Elementary, which had been constructed in 1968, was used as a temporary administration building. By 2003 NFISD was considering as the site of its new headquarters a 250-acre (100 ha) plot of land across from North Forest High School's main campus (formerly M. B. Smiley High School). Around 2003 the board approved construction of a new administration building. In October 2007 its headquarters were at 6010 Little York while its Office of Communications was located at Langstead. The foyer was renovated at a cost of $18,000, including a 144-gallon freshwater aquarium.

Jones-Cowart Stadium on the campus of the former Smiley High School, now North Forest High School, served as the district's stadium for sporting events.

== Transportation ==
The school district provided transportation to any elementary, middle, or high school student living over 2 miles (3.2 km) from his or her assigned school. The district may have added .1 miles (0.16 km) to establish a reasonable boundary. It also provided transportation for AM and PM kindergarten students around noon. If students faced hazards (such as construction areas and multilane highways) that prevented safe travel to the assigned schools, the Department of Transportation would decide to allow bus travel for those students.

The district had a fleet of fifty school buses that made 111 runs daily and served about 3,300 students. Including maintenance and service vehicles, the transportation department had a total of 162 vehicles.

== See also ==
- List of school districts in Texas
- Kendleton Independent School District - Majority African-American school district in Fort Bend County with low test scores closed by the TEA in 2010
- Wilmer-Hutchins Independent School District - Majority African-American school district in South Dallas and southern Dallas County with low test scores closed by the TEA in 2006
