= Wilmer–Hutchins Independent School District =

School district in Texas

Wilmer–Hutchins Independent School District (WHISD) was a school district in southern Dallas County, Texas serving the cities of Wilmer and Hutchins, a portion of Dallas (the district was last headquartered at 3820 East Illinois Avenue in Dallas), and a small portion of Lancaster. The district served urban, suburban, and rural areas. Some unincorporated areas with Ferris addresses were served by WHISD. It closed in 2006 and was absorbed by the Dallas Independent School District.

== History ==
Wilmer-Hutchins ISD; Student enrollment by year
| School Year | Total Students |
| 1988–89 | 3,870 |
| 1989–90 | 3,708 |
| 1990–91 | 3,792 |
| 1991–92 | 3,886 |
| 1992–93 | 3,967 |
| 1993–94 | 4,017 |
| 1994–95 | 4,007 |
| 1995–96 | 3,837 |
| 1996–97 | 3,381 |
| 1997–98 | 3,495 |
| 1998–99 | 3,651 |
| 1999–00 | 3,444 |
| 2000–01 | 3,283 |
| 2001–02 | 3,025 |
| 2002–03 | 2,902 |
| 2003–04 | 3,070 |
| 2004–05 | 2,916 |

Wilmer–Hutchins Independent School District was established in 1927 as a consolidation of four smaller school districts. Wilmer-Hutchins High School was established in 1928. At the time it had one elementary school for black students that had been built for $2,000, and that school had one teacher. At one point district officials cleaned the second floor of the black school and converted it into Wilmer-Hutchins Colored High School. Around 1939, Wilmer-Hutchins Colored High School burned down in a fire. After that occurred, children were bused to Dallas ISD schools such as Booker T. Washington High School and Lincoln High School. Black elementary students attended classes at Little Flock Baptist Church until a new elementary school named Morney Elementary School was opened.

In September 1954, more than 100 African-American students and parents went into Linfield Elementary School, then an all-White WHISD school. They were tired of the district's periodic closing of Melissa Pierce School, an all-Black school, so students would pick crops. The district turned the students away.

In 1958, WHISD had 1,746 White students and 577 African-American students. The number of African-American students increased rapidly over the next decade as the United States government established housing policies that concentrated many African-American families in the northern part of the district, which was in Dallas, while the cities of Hutchins and Wilmer remained majority white. The district, still clinging to its policy of segregation, spent millions of dollars building new schools for black students - Bishop Heights Elementary School, Milton K. Curry Junior High School and John F. Kennedy High School were all opened in the early 1960s. The more rural southern portion of the district remained predominantly white - Linfield, Alta Mesa, Wilmer and Hutchins Elementary Schools were reserved for white students, as was Wilmer-Hutchins Junior High and High School. In February 1970, WHISD was forced to implement desegregation busing.

The mayor of Hutchins, Don Lucky, formed a group of followers and hijacked Hutchins Elementary School for a period. Two out of three White people in WHISD moved away from the district in the early 1970s. WHISD became predominately economically poor and African-American; WHISD became controlled by African-Americans.

In 1999, the school district had 3,651 students. In April 2003 it had 3,060 students and had gained 35 students from the start of the year. By 2004 it had about 2,900 students. It was the only Dallas–Fort Worth metroplex school district to have lost population between 1999 and 2004. Many WHISD parents left the district, putting their children in Dallas Independent School District schools or charter schools.

=== Performance ===
Throughout its existence, the district was historically recognized as one of the poorest-performing school districts in Texas, in terms of both student test scores and managerial oversight. The Texas Education Agency (TEA) had, on several occasions, appointed monitors to oversee the district, with no long-term success. This led to the decrease of the student body in the district. The district shrank by more than a third of its student size in the 2000s (decade), and, by the 2000s (decade), the district's boundaries had more charter school students than any other district in the state of Texas.

In the 1970s, the State of Texas threatened to revoke the district's accreditation. Due to misuse of district funds and fraudulent elections in the 1980s the Texas Education Agency threatened to close the district. In the 1990s, for two years the TEA took over operations of WHISD.

Around 1996, according to the district's accounts, 600 students in the WHISD attendance zone attended school in other school districts, such as Dallas ISD and Lancaster ISD, by using false addresses or addresses of relatives, since many of the families in the WHISD attendance zone did not make enough money to enroll their children in private school. Due to hastiness and lack of following procedure when firing employees, the district in 1996 had a legal budget of $366,583 ($752533.53 when adjusted for inflation), amounting to about $114 ($234.02 when adjusted for inflation) per student. This is compared to the Plano Independent School District's legal spending of $161,598 ($331733.64 when adjusted for inflation), about $4 ($8.21 when adjusted for inflation) per student, and the Dallas Independent School District's legal budget of about $900,000 ($1847549.33 when adjusted for inflation), about $6 ($12.32 when adjusted for inflation) per student.

In 2004, the district closed Wilmer-Hutchins Performing Arts High School, A.L. Morney Learning Center, and Hutchins Academic Elementary School. The board also voted to eliminate the district's police department and fire the police chief, Cedric Davis. By 2005, the district's buildings were in poor shape. Large trees grew out of the bleachers of the Wilmer-Hutchins ISD football field. Wilmer-Hutchins High School failed fire inspections twice in a row.

Morgan Smith of the Texas Tribune said "When the state closed Wilmer-Hutchins ISD six years ago, the district was like the region’s unwanted stepchild — few of the neighboring districts wanted to absorb students from its low-performing schools."

Dianna Wray of the Houston Press stated that WHISD "was almost a mirror image of [North Forest Independent School District] in both demographics and history".

=== Closure ===
After a series of investigative stories in The Dallas Morning News found evidence of cheating on the Texas Assessment of Knowledge and Skills in Wilmer-Hutchins, the Texas Education Agency (TEA) began an investigation into the findings. That investigation found sufficient evidence of educator-led cheating for TEA to retroactively declare the school district "academically unacceptable" (the lowest possible ranking). The retroactive ranking was the second consecutive "academically unacceptable" rating, which gave the TEA authority to close WHISD and transfer its students to another school district. After WHISD voters overwhelmingly defeated a proposal to increase the property tax rate (many citing the district's shoddy recordkeeping), the TEA elected not to attempt yet another monitoring effort, and instead ordered the district closed for the 2005–2006 school year. The Lancaster ISD was given first opportunity to absorb the district, but declined. Four members of the board voted to reject the merger while the other three favored it.

Instead, the Dallas Independent School District agreed to absorb WHISD. All members of the DISD board voted to accept the merger. The United States Department of Justice approved the closure on December 13, 2005. The district held its final meeting on June 30, 2006. Dallas ISD elected to close all of the Wilmer-Hutchins schools and sent students to existing Dallas schools. The entire senior class of Wilmer-Hutchins High School went on to South Oak Cliff High School. Other students were divided into several different schools. Marlon Brooks, the principal of Wilmer-Hutchins High School as of 2011, said that some students had commutes of over one hour. Some students were over 12 miles (19 km) away from their zoned schools.

The Dallas Observer, an alternative newsweekly, argues that DISD agreed to absorb the district because of the significant tax revenue to be gained from the recently completed US$70 million Union Pacific Dallas Intermodal Terminal, which is located partly in the city of Wilmer and partly in the city of Hutchins, but wholly within the WHISD district boundaries.

After the closure of WHISD, property values in the district increased.

In 2007, a community group lobbied for the re-establishment of Wilmer-Hutchins ISD. Some WHISD residents missed the small-town country feel of WHISD schools and schools close to their houses. Some residents felt that the next preferable option is to have DISD open schools in the former WHISD territory.

== Use of former WHISD campuses and material by Dallas ISD ==
In January 2007, Dallas ISD removed 5,000 boxes with more than one half million personnel records and placed them in the DISD administration building. The district also removed the trophies, banners, and plaques from the WHISD campuses.

As a result of the merger, Dallas ISD will hold the titles to the former WHISD campus facilities. For the 2008 bond proposal DISD plans to demolish the former Kennedy-Curry Middle School campus and renovate the Wilmer-Hutchins High School campus. In addition DISD planned to build a new elementary school campus within the former WHISD territory.

In 2011 DISD re-opened Kennedy Curry and Wilmer-Hutchins High School and opened Wilmer-Hutchins Elementary School in the Wilmer-Hutchins area. The district had renovated Kennedy-Curry and expanded it by almost 60,000 square feet (5,600 m^{2}). Funds from the 2008 $1.35 billion bond were used to overhaul the schools.

== Demographics ==
In the district's final year of operation, it had around 3,000 students. About 80% were black and about 20% were Hispanic.

== District schools ==
=== High schools ===
- Wilmer-Hutchins High School (operating at district dissolution)
- Wilmer-Hutchins Colored High School (closed before district dissolution)
- Wilmer-Hutchins Performing Arts High School (opened in August 2003; closed 2004. - Held in the former Mamie White Elementary School)
- John F. Kennedy High School (opened in 1964; closed in 1968)

=== Middle schools ===
- Kennedy-Curry Middle School (opened in August 1968; operating at district dissolution)

=== Elementary schools ===
- Alta Mesa Learning Center (operating at district dissolution)
- Bishop Heights Elementary School (operating at district dissolution)
- C.S. Winn Elementary School (closed before district dissolution)
  - Dallas ISD inherited the building. By 2013 it had been targeted by thieves and vandals.
- Hutchins 5th Grade Center (operating at district dissolution)
- Wilmer Elementary School (operating at district dissolution)
- Hutchins Academic Elementary School (closed 2004)
- Linfield Elementary School (closed before district dissolution)
- Melissa Pierce School (closed before district dissolution)
- Mamie White Elementary School (closed before district dissolution)

=== Preschools ===
- A. L. Morney Learning Center (opened in 2003; closed in 2004)

== Headquarters ==
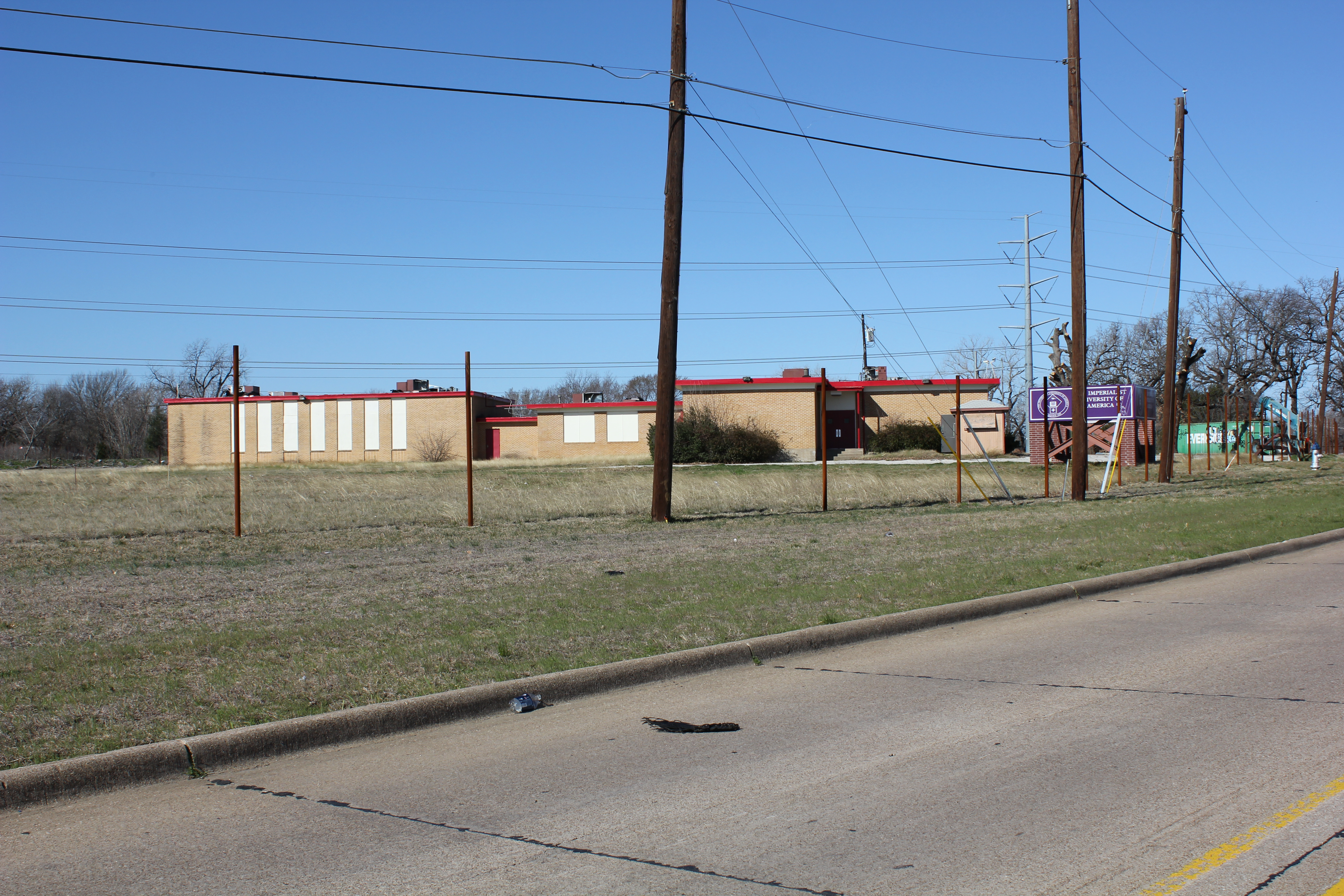
Former WHISD administration building

The district headquarters were located in Dallas, in a former elementary school. In 1996 Thomas Koroesec of the Dallas Observer said that the building, which does not have windows, "at times resembles an education ministry in some Third World country."

== District area ==
Hutchins and Wilmer, as of 2003, are working class communities south of the City of Dallas. Described as "semirural" suburbs by Thomas Korosec of the Dallas Observer, both are located on Interstate 45 and at the time had a mix of racial groups. WHISD also served portions of South Dallas and these areas, mostly African-American, were low income; as of 2003 WHISD was one of three school districts other than DISD which enrolled large numbers of students from the Dallas city limits: the others were Plano ISD and Richardson ISD. Korosec wrote that WHISD was "Actually more a creature of Dallas than its namesake towns".

In 1996 around 17,800 people lived within the district. U.S. Census figures stated that the area was about 70% African-American and mostly blue collar. About 20% of the residents lived in poverty. About 6.67% of the adults held one or more university degrees. Most residents were homeowners. In 1996 the Dallas Observer described the district, which had "urban demographics" and a location "a few minutes from downtown Dallas," as having an "incongruous rural feel" with "pig farms sit cheek by jowl with burglar-barred houses in sprawling subdivisions built 25 or 30 years ago" within the Dallas portion of Wilmer-Hutchins ISD.

Korosec stated that the residents blamed the poor performance of WHISD for the fact that nobody established new businesses and houses within the district boundaries. The district also had many landmarks considered undesirable including a landfill and the Hutchins State Jail.

In 1996 Fahim Minkah, the director of the nonprofit community group United Front of Dallas and a former organizer previously known as Fred Bell, said that many of the neighborhoods in WHISD were, as paraphrased by Korosec, "better than many in southern Dallas" and that the district area had "decent housing and a tolerable level of crime." Despite this he had withdrawn his children from WHISD schools.

== See also ==
- Kendleton Independent School District - Majority African-American school district in Fort Bend County with low test scores closed by the TEA in 2010
- North Forest Independent School District - Majority African-American school district in Houston with low test scores closed by the TEA in 2013
