= North Forest High School =

Public school in Texas, United States

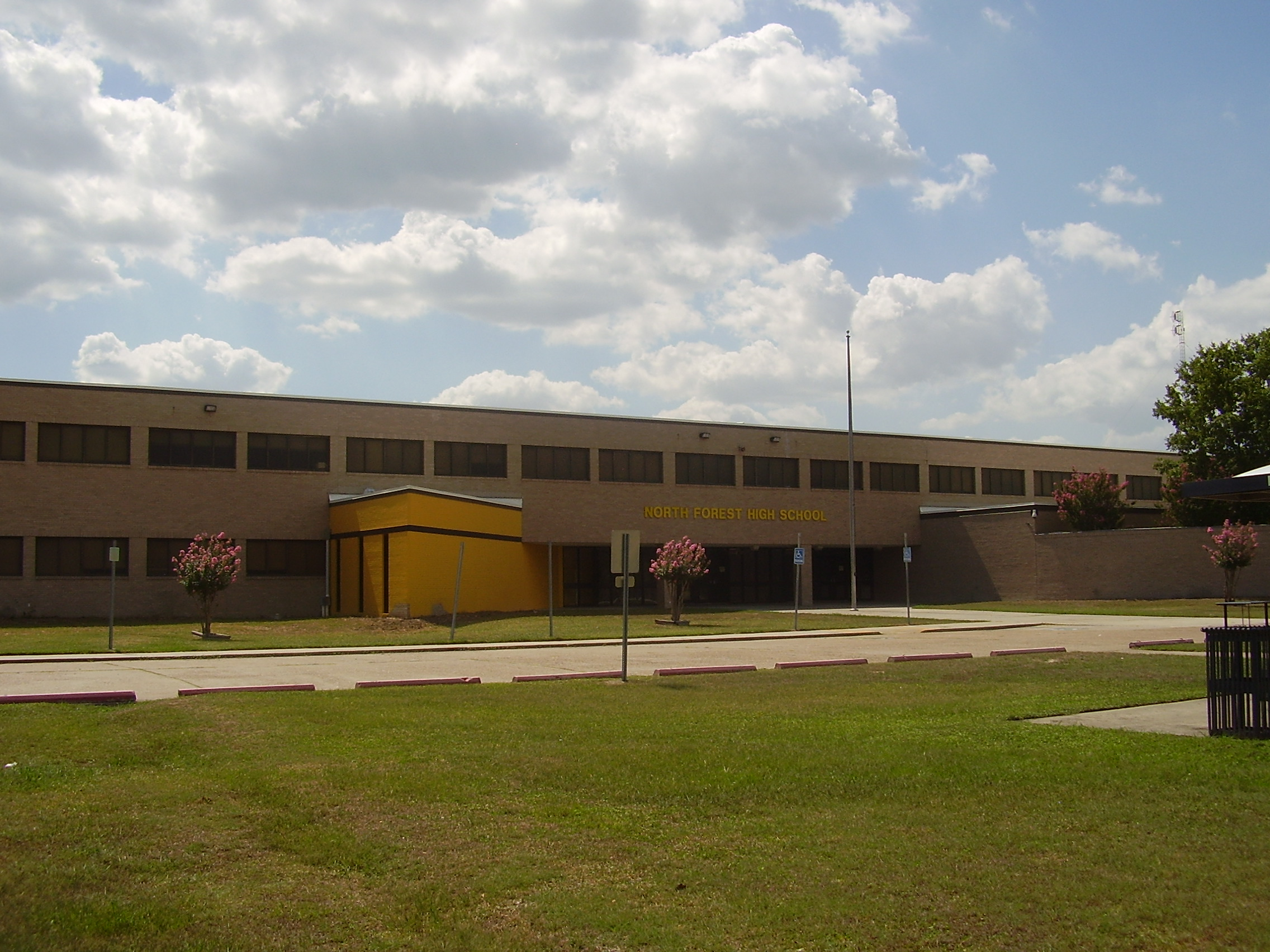
- Former building (now the Education Learning Center)

Location
- 10726 Mesa Drive; Houston, Harris, Texas 77078; United States; 29.866957°N 95.259842°W

Information
- Type: Public high school
- Established: 2008
- School district: Houston Independent School District (2013-); North Forest Independent School District (2008-2013)
- Principal: Connie Smith
- Teaching staff: 73.80 (FTE)
- Grades: 9-12
- Enrollment: 949 (2023-2024)
- Student to teacher ratio: 12.86
- Colors: Black and gold
- Athletics conference: UIL Region 3 District 23-4A
- Team name: Bulldogs
- Website: Official Website

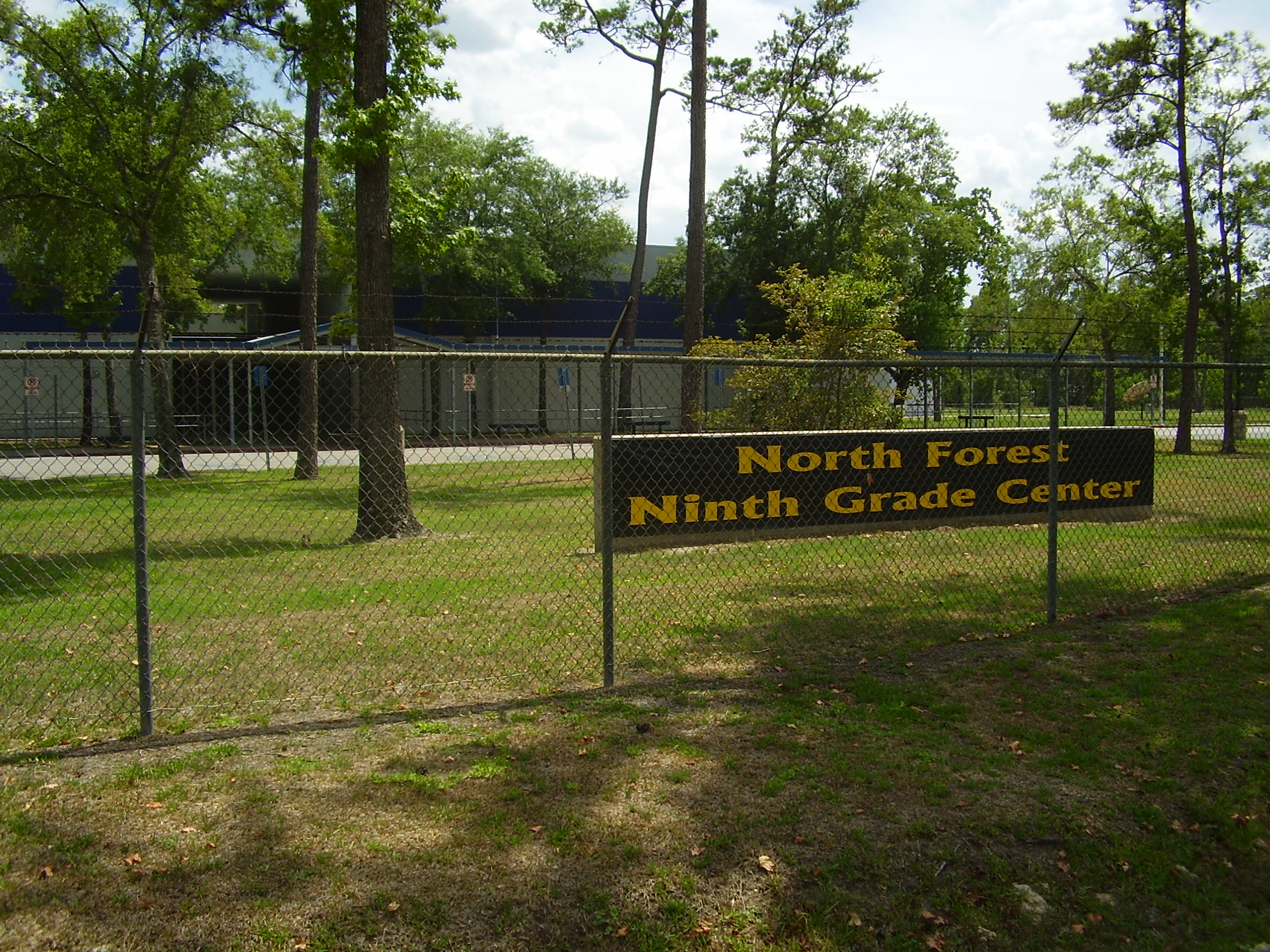
North Forest Ninth Grade Center

North Forest High School (NFHS) is a secondary school located in Houston, Texas, United States. The school is a part of the Houston Independent School District (HISD); it was a part of the North Forest Independent School District (NFISD) until the district closed on July 1, 2013.

== History ==
Founded in 2008 as a consolidation of Forest Brook High School at 7525 Tidwell Road and M. B. Smiley High School on Mesa Drive, the school was originally located on the campus of the former Forest Brook High School.

The Smiley campus was built in 1953, the Oak Village campus was built in 1967, and the Forest Brook campus was built in 1972. In September 2008 Hurricane Ike hit Houston and Forest Brook was damaged. Therefore, the school was relocated to the former Smiley campus.

In the 2010-2011 school year, NFISD opened the Ninth Grade Center at the former Oak Village Middle School campus. It opened under the direction of the Texas Education Agency (TEA)-appointed manager George McShan. The Ninth Grade Center housed newly arrived ninth graders. People repeating the ninth grade attended the main campus of North Forest High School.

Jennifer Radcliffe of the Houston Chronicle wrote in 2014 that "The way students and administrators tell it, the campus had spiraled out of control during North Forest ISD's decline." The NFHS Class of 2014 (12th graders) had, in their high school careers, a different principal for each grade. After Pamela "Pam" Farinas took over the position of the school principal in 2013, officials from a university outside of Texas told her that it did not recruit students from North Forest High. The same officials told Farinas that the school should have a new name. Around 2014, organizations had declined requests from North Forest High for field trips.

After assuming control of the campus in 2013, HISD replaced all of the faculty members and spent $1.6 million to improve the campus. None of the pre-HISD teachers returned to North Forest High. Farinas, previously the principal of the Gregory-Lincoln Education Center in the Fourth Ward, became principal. The metal detectors were removed after the HISD takeover. In 2014 students reported that the school restrooms now had soap, paper towels, and toilet paper. They also stated that students did not illicitly leave class and loiter in the hallways like they previously did. In addition they reported that there were no longer fires set in the restrooms. The head of the school's Parent-Teacher-Student Association, Maceo Dillard Jr., argued that the loss of the previous teaching staff damaged the school. Some of the teachers newly assigned to NFHS by HISD left shortly after beginning their teaching assignments as they were unable to deal with the difficulties.

TEA Commissioner Michael Williams stated that the school improved under HISD control.

The current North Forest High School facility opened in 2018. The former building, across Mesa Drive, became the Education Learning Center, a professional development facility.

== Campus ==
North Forest High School consists of the main campus on Mesa Dr. that serves students grades 9-12. The Jones Cowart Stadium is located directly behind the main campus and is operated by the Houston ISD Athletic Department.

After the July 1, 2013 closure of NFISD, on the North Forest High School main campus, Houston Independent School District officials found a room with a cabinet with Lenox china, a grandfather clock, furnishings, a green carpet, and flowered wallpaper. Ericka Mellon of the Houston Chronicle said that the room "looked like it belonged in a house, not a public school."

The library on the former main campus (now the Education Learning Center), the Carole M. Anderson Library, had 33 magazine titles and over 13,000 books. It was named after Carole Mae Anderson, a Smiley High School English teacher who donated books to the school's previous library facility.

The new NFHS campus was to be paid for money provided by the state of Texas.

With funds from a 2012 Bond, the Houston Independent School District built a brand new, $59.5 million campus that features flexible learning areas, a modern dining commons, and career training spaces, as well as large windows that provide ample natural lighting and open views to the prairie in front of the building and the forest in back. The new North Forest also features a gymnasium, auditorium, dance studio, theater room, and a unique indoor running track – a first of its kind in HISD.

== Demographics ==
In January 2012 the school had 1,285 students. Even though HISD anticipated having 1,200 students circa 2013, by 2014 the enrollment varied by time between 960 and 1,060; since Kashmere High School had more extracurricular programs than North Forest, some students previously at NFHS moved to Kashmere. At the time all of the students were classified as economically disadvantaged.

As of March 2014, of the school's students, 30 female students were mothers or were pregnant. Over 100 of the students were under correctional supervision, either probation or parole. As of 2014, Jennifer Radcliffe of the Houston Chronicle stated that "[a] significant number" have addiction to kush and other addictions to controlled substances.

In the 2022-2023 school year, the racial demographics of the student body consisted of:

- 46.3% Hispanic American
- 51.4% African American
- 0.9% White American
- 0.3% Asian American
- 0.4% Native American
- 0.6% Multiracial

== Academic performance ==
In a six-year period until 2011, North Forest High was consistently ranked "academically unacceptable" by the Texas Education Agency.

The dropout rate of the Class of 2011 was slightly above 30 percent.

== Athletics ==
Plez Atkins served as the coach of the NFHS American football team prior to the HISD takeover in 2013. The football team had a regular season in which it was undefeated prior to the HISD takeover. After the takeover the school lost its coaching staff. Jennifer Radcliffe of the Houston Chronicle wrote that the loss of the coaches caused a decline in the American football team.

== Attendance zone ==
The Houston Housing Authority public housing complex Forest Green Townhomes is zoned to North Forest High.

== Extracurricular activities ==
In 2013, after the HISD takeover, the administration started the support groups for anger management, substance abuse, and defiance.

== Dress code ==
Since 2011, North Forest High has had a school uniform standard dress policy.

The Texas Education Agency specifies that the parents and/or guardians of students zoned to a school with uniforms may apply for a waiver to opt out of the uniform policy so their children do not have to wear the uniform; parents must specify "bona fide" reasons, such as religious reasons or philosophical objections.

== Feeder patterns ==
The following schools are relevant to the school's feeder pattern.

The early childhood center in the North Forest area is Fonwood Early Childhood Center.

Elementary schools feeding into North Forest High:

- Thurgood Marshall
- Shadydale

(partial)

- Elmore
- Hilliard

Forest Brook Middle School feeds into North Forest High School.

== Gallery ==
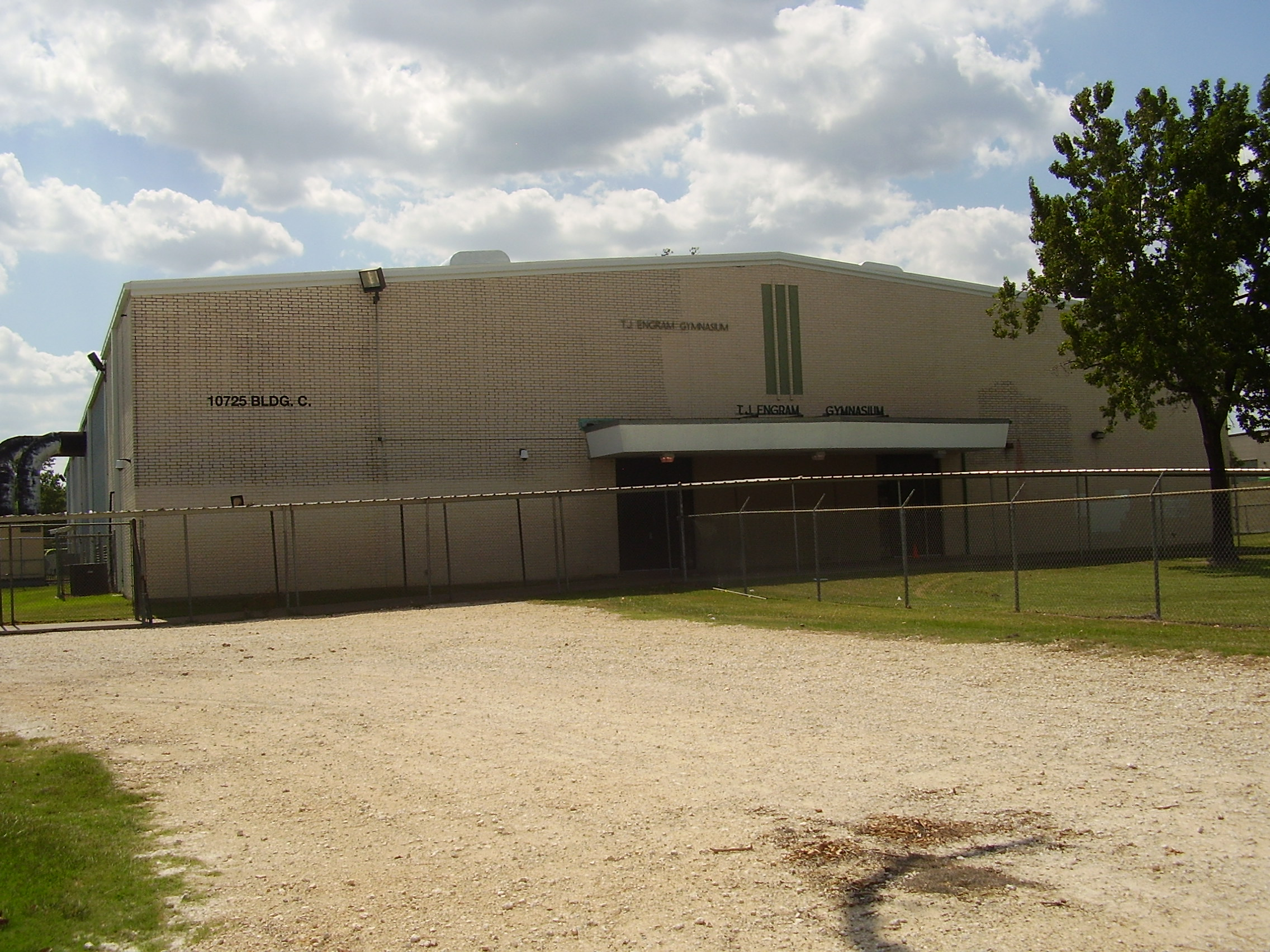
T. J. Engram Gymnasium (Smiley campus)

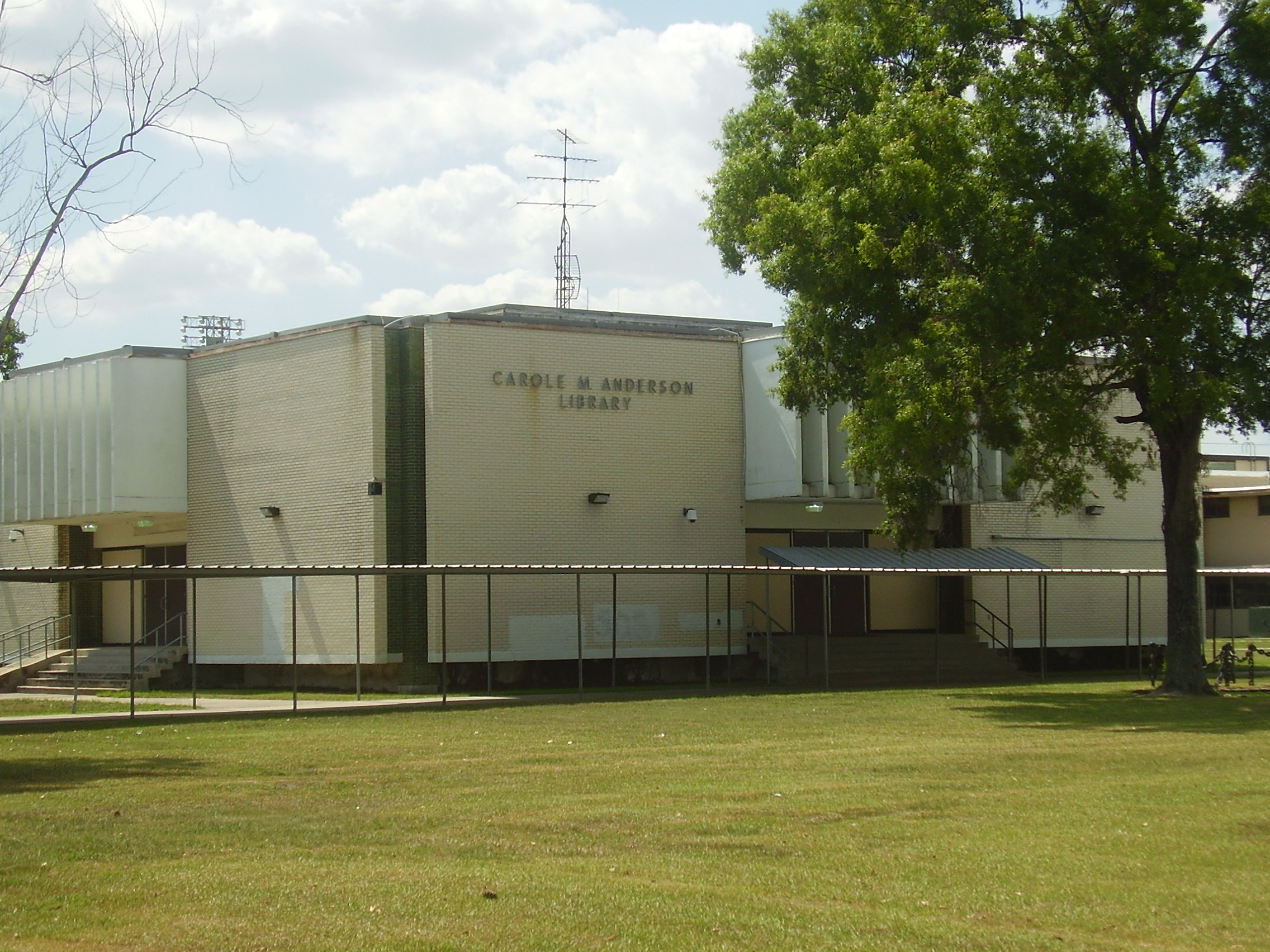
Carole M. Anderson Library (Smiley campus)

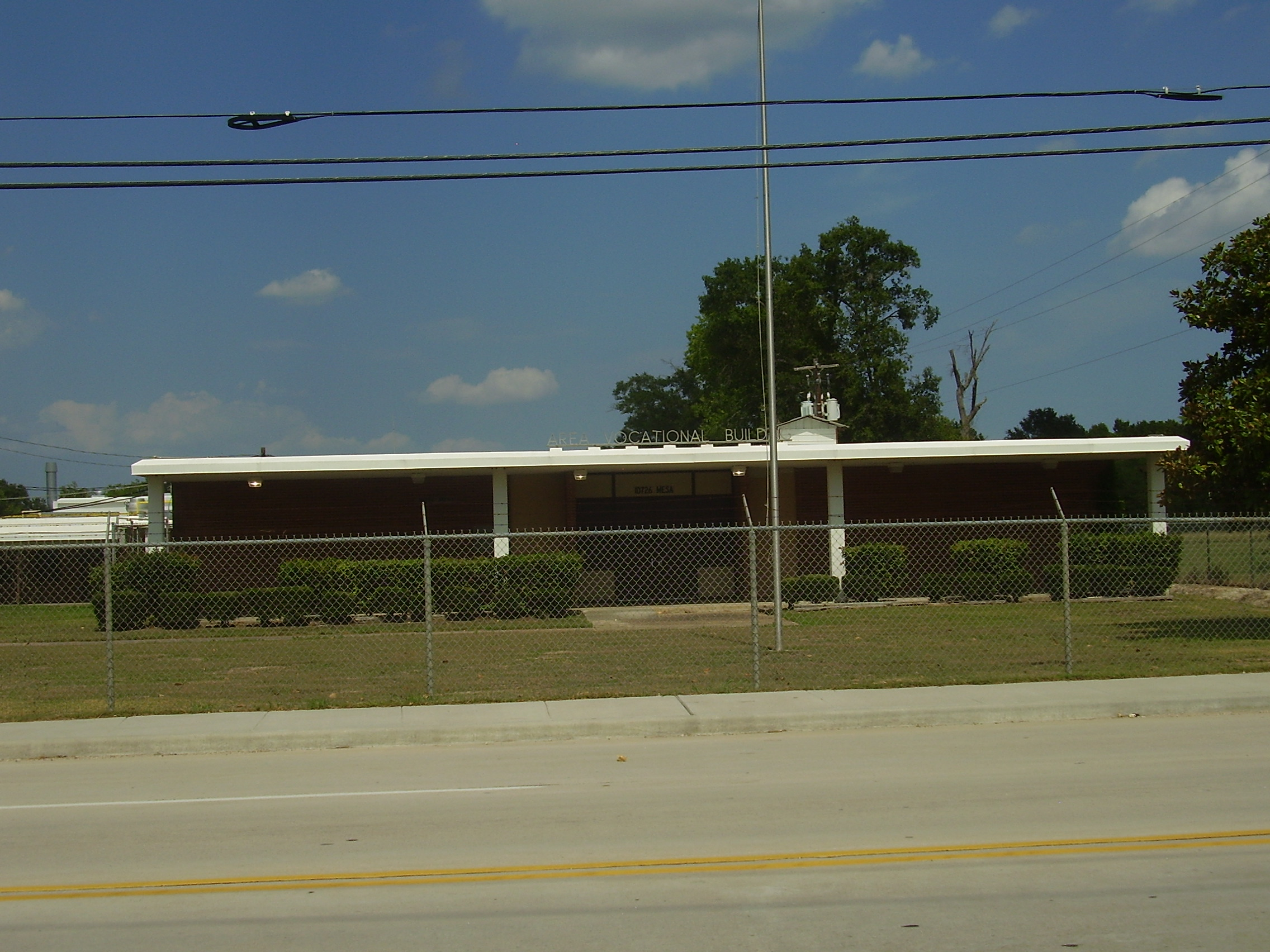
Area Vocational Building (Smiley campus)

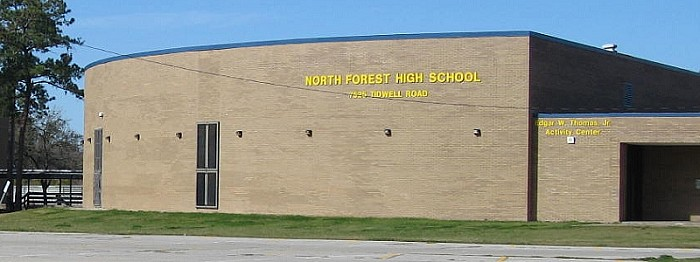
The initial campus of North Forest High School, formerly Forest Brook High School and now Forest Brook Middle School
