= List of How Did This Get Made? episodes =

How Did This Get Made? is a comedy podcast on the Earwolf network hosted by Paul Scheer, June Diane Raphael, and Jason Mantzoukas.

Generally, How Did This Get Made? is released every two weeks. During the show's off-week, a ".5" episode is uploaded featuring Scheer announcing the next week's movie, as well as challenges for the fans. In addition to the shows and mini-shows, the How Did This Get Made? stream hosted the first three episodes of Bitch Sesh, the podcast of previous guests Casey Wilson and Danielle Schneider, in December 2015. It has also hosted episodes of its own spin-off podcast, the How Did This Get Made? Origin Stories, in which Blake Harris interviews people involved with the films covered by the main show. In December 2017, an episode was recorded for the Pee Cast Blast event, and released exclusively on Stitcher Premium.

Every episode has featured Paul Scheer as the host of the podcast. The only episode to date in which Scheer hosted remotely was The Smurfs, in which he Skyped in. Raphael has taken extended breaks from the podcast for both filming commitments and maternity leave. Mantzoukas has also missed episodes due to work, but has also Skyped in for various episodes. On the occasions that neither Raphael nor Mantzoukas are available for live appearances, Scheer calls in previous fan-favorite guests for what is known as a How Did This Get Made? All-Stars episode.

== List of episodes ==
Episode	Film or episode title	Paul	June	Jason	Guest(s)	Release date	Notes
1	"Burlesque"	✓	✓	✓	Nick Kroll	December 21, 2010	This episode was re-released on January 1, 2021 with new content from the hosts in the introduction to belatedly commemorate the podcast's 10-year anniversary
2	"Season of the Witch"	✓	✓	✓	Chris Hardwick	January 10, 2011	N/A
3	"Old Dogs"	✓	✓	✓	Casey Wilson	January 26, 2011	N/A
4	"The Last Airbender"	✓	✓	✓	Jon Daly	February 14, 2011	N/A
5	"Drive Angry"	✓	✓	✓	Curtis Gwinn	March 1, 2011	N/A
6	"Battlefield Earth"	✓	✓	✓	Rob Huebel	March 15, 2011	N/A
7	"All About Steve"	✓	✓	✓	Brandon Johnson	April 5, 2011	N/A
8	"Sucker Punch"	✓	✓	✓	Chelsea Peretti	April 18, 2011	N/A
9	"Fast Five"	✓	✓	✓	Adam Scott	May 15, 2011	N/A
10	"Mac and Me"	✓	✓	✓	Adam Pally	May 16, 2011	N/A
11	"The Tourist"	✓	✓	×	Gil Ozeri; Natasha Leggero	May 30, 2011	N/A
12	"The Love Guru"	✓	✓	✓	Matt Walsh	June 14, 2011	N/A
13	"Crank: High Voltage"	✓	✓	✓	Jensen Karp	June 28, 2011	N/A
14	"Green Lantern"	✓	✓	✓	Paul Rust	July 12, 2011	N/A
15	"The Back-up Plan"	✓	✓	✓	Jackie Clarke	July 26, 2011	N/A
16	"The Smurfs"	✓	✓	✓	Paul F. Tompkins	August 9, 2011	Howl.fm exclusive
17	"Skyline"	✓	✓	✓	Jordan Morris	August 23, 2011	N/A
18	"Gigli"	✓	✓	✓	Danielle Schneider	September 13, 2011	N/A
19	"The Wicker Man"	✓	✓	✓	Jonah Ray	September 27, 2011	N/A
20	"Punisher: War Zone"	✓	✓	×	Patton Oswalt; Lexi Alexander	October 3, 2011	N/A
21	"I Know Who Killed Me"	✓	✓	✓	Ken Marino	October 18, 2011	N/A
22	"Leprechaun: In the Hood"	✓	✓	✓	Kumail Nanjiani	November 1, 2011	N/A
23	"The Room: Director's Edition"	✓	✓	✓	Greg Sestero; Steve Heisler	November 15, 2011	N/A
24	"Superman III"	✓	✓	✓	Damon Lindelof	November 29, 2011	First live episode from Largo at the Coronet
24.1	"Superman III"	✓	✓	✓	Damon Lindelof; Jack O'Halloran	December 6, 2011	First live episode from Largo at the Coronet, continuation of previous episode
25	"Catwoman"	✓	✓	✓	Jamie Denbo	December 20, 2011	N/A
26	"Jingle All the Way"	✓	✓	✓	Joe Mande	December 22, 2011	This episode was re-released on Dec. 28, 2018 with new content from the hosts in the introduction
27	"The Twilight Saga: Breaking Dawn – Part 1"	✓	✓	✓	Doug Benson	January 3, 2012	N/A
28	"Crank: Director's Edition"	✓	×	✓	Brian Taylor	January 17, 2012	N/A
29	"Trespass"	✓	✓	✓	Rachael Harris	January 31, 2012	N/A
30	"Cool as Ice: Director's Edition"	✓	✓	✓	Vanilla Ice; Brian Huskey	February 14, 2012	N/A
31	"Birdemic: Shock and Terror"	✓	✓	✓	"Weird Al" Yankovic; Whitney Moore	February 28, 2012	Live episode from Largo at the Coronet
32	"88 Minutes"	✓	✓	✓	Pete Holmes	March 13, 2012	N/A
33	"Abduction"	✓	✓	✓	Jessica Chaffin	March 27, 2012	This episode is no longer available to stream via podcast services.
34	"The Adventures of Pluto Nash"	✓	✓	✓	Lennon Parham; Jessica St. Clair	April 10, 2012	N/A
35	"Tiptoes"	✓	✓	✓	Dave Holmes	May 1, 2012	N/A
36	"On the Line"	✓	✓	✓	Ike Barinholtz	May 15, 2012	N/A
37	"Speed 2: Cruise Control"	✓	✓	✓	Scott Aukerman	June 5, 2012	N/A
38	"Bad Ass"	✓	✓	✓	Danny Trejo	June 12, 2012	N/A
39	"Godzilla"	✓	✓	✓	Chris Gore	June 19, 2012	N/A
40	"Judge Dredd"	✓	✓	✓	Erica Oyama	July 3, 2012	N/A
41	"Spider-Man 3"	✓	✓	✓	Kulap Vilaysack	July 17, 2012	N/A
42	"Batman & Robin"	✓	×	✓	Matt Mira; Jesse Falcon	August 7, 2012	N/A
43	"Wild Wild West"	✓	✓	✓	Kevin Smith	August 21, 2012	N/A
44	"Jaws 4: The Revenge"	✓	✓	✓	Jake Fogelnest	September 4, 2012	N/A
45	"Road House"	✓	✓	✓	Doug Benson	September 18, 2012	Live episode from Bumbershoot, Seattle
46	"Barb Wire"	✓	✓	✓	Jesse Thorn	October 2, 2012	N/A
47	"Super Mario Bros."	✓	✓	✓	Jenny Slate	October 16, 2012	Live episode from Bumbershoot, Seattle
48	"Sleepaway Camp"	✓	✓	✓	Zack Pearlman	October 30, 2012	N/A
49	"Cobra"	✓	✓	✓	Brian Posehn; Rhett Miller	November 13, 2012	Live episode from Bumbershoot, Seattle
50	"The Twilight Saga: Breaking Dawn – Part 2"	✓	×	✓	Doug Benson	November 27, 2012	N/A
51	"Liz & Dick"	✓	✓	✓	Drew Droege	December 11, 2012	N/A
52	"Reindeer Games"	✓	✓	✓	Howard Kremer	December 25, 2012	This episode was re-released on Dec. 27, 2019 with new content from Paul and Jason in the introduction
53	"Anaconda"	✓	✓	✓	Michael Ian Black	January 8, 2013	Live episode from The Bell House, New York
54	"The Odd Life of Timothy Green"	✓	✓	✓	Tim Heidecker	January 22, 2013	N/A
55	"The Devil's Advocate"	✓	✓	✓	Julie Klausner	February 5, 2013	Live episode from The Bell House, New York
56	"Nothing But Trouble"	✓	✓	✓	Stephen Rannazzisi	February 19, 2013	N/A
57	"From Justin to Kelly"	✓	✓	✓	Nick Kroll	March 5, 2013	Live episode from Largo at the Coronet
58	"In the Name of the King"	✓	✓	✓	Seth Morris	March 19, 2013	N/A
59	"Spice World"	✓	✓	✓	Retta	April 2, 2013	N/A
60	"Street Fighter"	✓	✓	✓	John Gemberling	April 16, 2013	N/A
61	"Stop! Or My Mom Will Shoot"	✓	✓	✓	Kate Spencer	April 30, 2013	N/A
62	"Joyful Noise"	✓	✓	✓	Fred Stoller	May 14, 2013	N/A
63	"Fast & Furious 6"	✓	✓	✓	Adam Scott	May 28, 2013	N/A
64	"After Earth"	✓	✓	✓	Paul F. Tompkins	June 11, 2013	N/A
65	"Howard the Duck"	✓	✓	✓	Kristen Schaal	June 25, 2013	Live episode from Largo at the Coronet
66	"Demolition Man"	✓	✓	✓	Wyatt Cenac	July 9, 2013	Live episode from SubCulture, New York
67	"Sharknado"	✓	✓	✓	Scott Aukerman	July 16, 2013	N/A
68	"Over The Top"	✓	✓	✓	Bobby Moynihan	July 30, 2013	Live episode from SubCulture, New York
69	"Crocodile Dundee in Los Angeles"	✓	✓	✓	Eddie Pepitone; Matthew Berry	August 13, 2013	N/A
70	"Gymkata"	✓	✓	✓	Michael Showalter	August 27, 2013	Live episode from Largo at the Coronet
71	"The Glimmer Man"	✓	✓	✓	Jon Lajoie	September 10, 2013	N/A
72	"Toys"	✓	×	✓	Drew McWeeny	September 24, 2013	N/A
73	"Congo"	✓	✓	✓	Nick Wiger	October 9, 2013	N/A
74	"Halloween III: Season of the Witch"	✓	✓	✓	N/A	October 22, 2013	N/A
75	"Daredevil"	✓	✓	✓	Ed Brubaker	November 5, 2013	N/A
76	"Fair Game"	✓	✓	✓	Danny Zuker	November 19, 2013	N/A
77	"Hudson Hawk"	✓	✓	✓	Emily V. Gordon	December 3, 2013	N/A
78	"Crossroads"	✓	✓	✓	Jeff Rubin	December 17, 2013	N/A
79	"Deck the Halls"	✓	✓	✓	Andrea Savage	December 31, 2013	Live episode from Largo at the Coronet
80	"Jack Frost"	✓	✓	✓	Dan Harmon	January 14, 2014	Live episode from Largo at the Coronet; This episode was re-released on Jan, 4, 2019 with new content from the hosts in the introduction
81	"Mortal Kombat"	✓	✓	✓	Cameron Esposito	January 28, 2014	N/A
82	"Double Team"	✓	✓	✓	Owen Burke	February 11, 2014	N/A
83	"Winter's Tale"	✓	×	✓	Andy Daly	February 25, 2014	N/A
84	"No Holds Barred"	✓	✓	✓	Thomas Lennon	March 25, 2014	Live episode from Largo at the Coronet
85	"Color of Night"	✓	✓	✓	Amy Schumer	April 22, 2014	N/A
86	"Ernest Goes to Jail"	✓	✓	✓	Lesley Arfin	May 20, 2014	N/A
87	"Easy Rider: The Ride Back"	✓	✓	✓	Nick Thune	June 17, 2014	N/A
88	"Mr. Nanny"	✓	✓	✓	Rob Corddry	July 8, 2014	Live episode from Largo at the Coronet
89	"Gooby"	✓	✓	✓	Nathan Fielder	July 22, 2014	N/A
90	"Sharknado 2: The Second One"	✓	✓	✓	Scott Aukerman	August 1, 2014	N/A
91	"The 1st Annual Howdies Part 1"	✓	✓	✓	N/A	August 19, 2014	"Awards" clip show
92	"The 1st Annual Howdies Part 2"	✓	✓	✓	N/A	August 26, 2014	"Awards" clip show
93	"Staying Alive"	✓	✓	✓	Katie Dippold	September 9, 2014	Live episode from Largo at the Coronet
94	"Glitter"	✓	×	×	Adam Scott; Casey Wilson; Dan Levy	September 23, 2014	Live episode from Largo at the Coronet
95	"Temptation: Confessions of a Marriage Counselor"	✓	✓	✓	Katie Aselton	October 8, 2014	N/A
96	"Monkey Shines"	✓	✓	✓	N/A	October 29, 2014	N/A
97	"Rhinestone"	✓	✓	✓	Matt L. Jones	November 7, 2014	Live episode from Largo at the Coronet
98	"LOL"	✓	×	×	Rob Huebel; Chelsea Peretti; John Flynn	November 21, 2014	Live episode from Largo at the Coronet
99	"A View to a Kill"	✓	✓	✓	Matt Gourley; Matt Mira	December 12, 2014	Live episode from Largo at the Coronet. Crossover with the James Bonding podcast
100	"Junior"	✓	✓	✓	N/A	December 26, 2014	N/A
101	"Xanadu"	✓	✓	✓	Michaela Watkins	January 12, 2015	Live episode from Largo at the Coronet
102	"Tango & Cash"	✓	✓	✓	Nick Kroll	January 23, 2015	N/A
103	"Zardoz"	✓	×	✓	Brett Gelman	February 13, 2015	N/A
104	"Zardoz"	✓	✓	×	N/A	February 25, 2015	Continuation of Zardoz. First movie to receive a second episode
105	"Safe Haven"	✓	×	✓	Eliza Skinner; Jordan Rubin	March 6, 2015	N/A
106	"Deep Blue Sea"	✓	×	✓	Paul F. Tompkins; Evan Goldberg	March 20, 2015	Live episode from Largo at the Coronet
107	"Lake Placid"	✓	×	✓	Paul F. Tompkins; Nate Corddry	April 3, 2015	Live episode from Largo at the Coronet
108	"Con Air"	✓	✓	✓	Seth Grahame-Smith	April 17, 2015	Live episode from Largo at the Coronet
109	"Face/Off"	✓	×	✓	Randall Park	May 1, 2015	Live episode from Largo at the Coronet, Call-in by June
110	"The Island of Dr. Moreau"	✓	✓	×	Alex Fernie	May 15, 2015	TBA
111	"Hercules in New York"	✓	✓	✓	Abbi Jacobson	May 29, 2015	Live episode from the Irving Plaza, New York
112	"Jupiter Ascending"	✓	×	✓	Franklin Leonard; Razzle Dangerously	June 12, 2015	N/A
113	"Teenage Mutant Ninja Turtles II: The Secret of the Ooze"	✓	✓	✓	Adam Pally	June 26, 2015	Live episode from the Irving Plaza, New York
114	"Runaway"	✓	✓	✓	River Butcher	July 10, 2015	N/A
115	"Sharknado 3: Oh Hell No!"	✓	×	✓	Scott Aukerman	July 28, 2015	N/A
116	"Top Dog"	✓	✓	✓	N/A	August 10, 2015	Live episode from House of Blues, San Diego
117	"Theodore Rex"	✓	✓	✓	N/A	August 21, 2015	Live episode from House of Blues, San Diego
118	"Furious 7"	✓	✓	✓	Adam Scott	September 4, 2015	Live episode from Largo at the Coronet
119	"Maximum Overdrive"	✓	✓	✓	Andy Daly	September 18, 2015	Live episode from Largo at the Coronet
120	"Masters of the Universe"	✓	✓	✓	Tatiana Maslany	October 2, 2015	N/A
121	"Perfect"	✓	✓	✓	Seth Morris	October 16, 2015	Live episode from Largo at the Coronet
122	"Death Spa"	✓	✓	✓	Horatio Sanz	October 30, 2015	Live episode from Largo at the Coronet
123	"Lifeforce"	✓	×	✓	Lennon Parham	November 13, 2015	N/A
124	"Hackers"	✓	✓	✓	N/A	November 27, 2015	N/A
125	"Steel"	✓	✓	✓	Anders Holm	December 14, 2015	Live episode from Largo at the Coronet
126	"Star Wars Holiday Special"	✓	×	✓	Matt Gourley; Eden Sher	December 25, 2015	N/A
127	"Kazaam"	✓	✓	✓	Kay Cannon	January 8, 2016	Live episode from Largo at the Coronet
128	"Streets of Fire"	✓	×	✓	Rachel Bloom; Jessica St. Clair	January 25, 2016	Live episode from Largo at the Coronet
129	"The Apple"	✓	✓	✓	Andy Richter	February 5, 2016	Live episode from Largo at the Coronet
130	"Teen Witch"	✓	✓	✓	Deanna Cheng	February 24, 2016	N/A
131	"The Covenant"	✓	×	✓	Alison Rich	March 9, 2016	N/A
132	"Bloodsport"	✓	×	✓	Nicole Byer	March 23, 2016	Live episode from Largo at the Coronet
133	"The Quest"	✓	✓	✓	Jon Gabrus	April 1, 2016	N/A
134	"Can't Stop the Music"	✓	×	✓	Pete Holmes; Cameron Esposito	April 15, 2016	Live episode from Largo at the Coronet
135	"Solarbabies"	✓	✓	✓	John Mulaney	April 29, 2016	Live episode from Largo at the Coronet
136	"Hell Comes to Frogtown"	✓	×	✓	Natasha Leggero; Moshe Kasher	May 13, 2016	Live episode from Largo at the Coronet
137	"The Avengers"	✓	✓	✓	Tom Scharpling	May 27, 2016	Live episode from the Vulture Festival, New York City
138	"The Boy Next Door"	✓	×	✓	Heather Anne Campbell; Ben Siemon	June 10, 2016	N/A
139	"Simply Irresistible"	✓	✓	✓	Jensen Karp	June 24, 2016	N/A
140	"Mannequin Two: On the Move"	✓	✓	✓	Steve Agee	July 11, 2016	N/A
141	"The Shadow"	✓	✓	✓	Pete Davidson	July 22, 2016	Live episode from Largo at the Coronet
142	"The Phantom"	✓	×	✓	Eliza Skinner; Ed Brubaker	August 5, 2016	Live episode from Largo at the Coronet
143	"Gods of Egypt"	✓	×	✓	Erin Gibson; Bryan Safi	August 19, 2016	N/A
144	"Stealth"	✓	×	✓	Charlie Sanders	September 16, 2016	N/A
145	"Vampire Academy"	✓	×	✓	Michael Showalter; Aisling Bea	September 30, 2016	N/A
146	"Dreamcatcher"	✓	×	✓	Curtis Gwinn; Jessica McKenna	October 14, 2016	N/A
147	"Gamer"	✓	×	✓	Robert Kirkman; Emily V. Gordon	October 28, 2016	Live episode from Largo at the Coronet
148	"Vampire's Kiss"	✓	✓	✓	Hayes Davenport	November 11, 2016	Live episode from the Now Hear This Festival, Anaheim
149	"The Lawnmower Man"	✓	×	✓	Emily Heller; Neil Casey	November 25, 2016	Live episode from Largo at the Coronet
150	"Grease 2"	✓	✓	✓	Anna Faris	December 9, 2016	N/A
151	"The 2nd Annual Howdies Part 1"	✓	✓	✓	N/A	December 16, 2016	"Awards" clip show
152	"The 2nd Annual Howdies Part 2"	✓	✓	✓	N/A	December 23, 2016	"Awards" clip show
153	"Escape from L.A."	✓	×	✓	D'Arcy Carden; Dan Levy	January 6, 2017	Live episode from Largo at the Coronet
154	"Highlander II: The Quickening"	✓	✓	✓	Sam Richardson	January 20, 2017	Live episode from Largo at the Coronet
155	"Airborne"	✓	×	×	Scott Aukerman; Kumail Nanjiani; Danielle Schneider	February 3, 2017	Live episode from Largo at the Coronet
156	"xXx: Return of Xander Cage"	✓	✓	✓	Adam Scott	February 17, 2017	Live episode from Largo at the Coronet
157	"Surf Ninjas"	✓	×	×	Rob Huebel; Nicole Byer; Gil Ozeri	March 3, 2017	Live episode from Largo at the Coronet
158	"Body Parts"	✓	×	✓	Gillian Jacobs; Claudia O'Doherty	March 17, 2017	Live episode from Largo at the Coronet
159	"Sleepwalkers"	✓	✓	✓	Lauren Lapkus	March 31, 2017	N/A
160	"The Lake House"	✓	×	✓	Starlee Kine; Aisling Bea	April 14, 2017	Live episode from Largo at the Coronet
161	"The Fate of the Furious"	✓	✓	✓	Adam Scott	April 28, 2017	N/A
162	"My Stepmother Is an Alien"	✓	✓	✓	Whitney Cummings	May 12, 2017	Live episode from Largo at the Coronet
163	"The Running Man"	✓	✓	✓	Kulap Vilaysack	May 26, 2017	N/A
164	"The Wraith"	✓	×	✓	Eliza Skinner; Tim Baltz	June 9, 2017	Live episode from Largo at the Coronet
165	"Ninja Terminator"	✓	✓	✓	Ilana Glazer; Abbi Jacobson	June 23, 2017	Live episode from Colossal Clusterfest, San Francisco
166	"Timecop"	✓	✓	✓	Nick Kroll	July 7, 2017	Live episode from the Paramount Theatre, Austin
167	"Chopping Mall"	✓	✓	✓	Mary Holland	July 21, 2017	Live episode from Largo at the Coronet
168	"Hard Ticket to Hawaii"	✓	×	✓	Andrea Savage; Karen Kilgariff	August 4, 2017	Live episode from Largo at the Coronet
169	"The Garbage Pail Kids Movie"	✓	✓	✓	Jon Lovett	August 18, 2017	Live episode from Largo at the Coronet
170	"Bratz"	✓	✓	✓	Kate Berlant	September 1, 2017	N/A
171	"Miami Connection"	✓	✓	✓	Chris Geere	September 15, 2017	Live episode from Largo at the Coronet
172	"The Last Dragon"	✓	✓	✓	Hannibal Buress	September 29, 2017	Live episode from Colossal Clusterfest, San Francisco
173	"Virtuosity"	✓	×	✓	Sarah Silverman; Taran Killam	October 13, 2017	Live episode from Largo at the Coronet
174	"Jason X"	✓	×	✓	Rob Huebel; Jenny Slate	October 27, 2017	Live episode from Largo at the Coronet
175	"Ultraviolet"	✓	×	✓	Mike Mitchell; Nick Wiger	November 10, 2017	Live episode from Largo at the Coronet
176	"The Jazz Singer"	✓	✓	✓	Chris Gethard	November 24, 2017	Live episode the Now Hear This Festival, New York City
177	"The Disaster Artist"	✓	✓	✓	James Franco; Dave Franco; Seth Rogen; Ari Graynor; Michael H. Weber; Scott Neustadter; Greg Sestero; Tommy Wiseau	December 8, 2017	Scheer's interviews with cast and crew members of The Disaster Artist (a film featuring Scheer, Raphael, and Mantzoukas in the cast) are presented alongside the original How Did This Get Made episode covering The Room with Greg Sestero and Steve Heisler
N–A	"Valerian and the City of a Thousand Planets"	✓	×	✓	Doug Benson; Jessica St. Clair	December 19, 2017	Live episode, recorded at the Theatre at Ace Hotel on December 12, 2017, for Pee Cast Blast 2017. Originally released exclusively on Stitcher Premium and re-released on the free feed on April 10, 2020 as episode 237.
178	"Superman IV: The Quest for Peace"	✓	×	✓	Natasha Lyonne; Jessica St. Clair	December 22, 2017	Live episode the Town Hall, New York City
179	"Second Sight"	✓	×	✓	Jessica St. Clair	January 5, 2018	Live episode from the Wilbur Theatre, Boston
180	"Howling II: Your Sister Is a Werewolf"	✓	×	✓	Tig Notaro; Stephanie Allynne	January 19, 2018	Live episode from the Bentzen Ball Comedy Festival, Washington D.C
181	"Freejack"	✓	×	✓	Phoebe Robinson; Jessica St. Clair	February 2, 2018	Live episode from the Town Hall, New York City
182	"Rock Star"	✓	✓	✓	Jake Weisman	February 16, 2018	Live episode from Largo at the Coronet
183	"Ladybugs"	✓	✓	✓	Patton Oswalt	March 2, 2018	Live episode from Largo at the Coronet
184	"Johnny Mnemonic"	✓	×	✓	Jessica St. Clair	March 16, 2018	Live episode from the Wilbur Theatre, Boston
185	"Adore"	✓	×	✓	Charles Rogers; Jordan Firstman; Kulap Vilaysack	March 30, 2018	N/A
186	"Geostorm"	✓	×	✓	Colton Dunn; Jessica St. Clair	April 12, 2018	Live episode from Largo at the Coronet
187	"Beautiful Creatures"	✓	×	✓	Erin Whitehead; Kate Hagen	April 27, 2018	N/A
188	"Body Rock"	✓	✓	✓	Alison Brie	May 11, 2018	Live episode from Largo at the Coronet
189	"Sky Captain and the World of Tomorrow"	✓	×	✓	Joe Mande; Tawny Newsome	May 24, 2018	Live episode from Largo at the Coronet
190	"The Hurricane Heist"	✓	✓	✓	N/A	June 7, 2018	Live episode from Onion Fest in Chicago
191	"Rad"	✓	✓	✓	N/A	June 22, 2018	Live episode from Onion Fest in Chicago
192	"Striptease"	✓	✓	✓	N/A	July 5, 2018	Live episode from Onion Fest in Chicago
193	"Blues Brothers 2000"	✓	✓	✓	N/A	July 19, 2018	Live episode from Onion Fest in Chicago
194	"Yes, Giorgio"	✓	✓	✓	N/A	August 3, 2018	Live episode from Brooklyn Academy of Music, New York
195	"Never Too Young to Die"	✓	✓	✓	Matt McConkey	August 16, 2018	Live episode from Largo at the Coronet
196	"The Meg"	✓	×	✓	Nicole Byer; Adam Scott	August 31, 2018	Live episode from Largo at the Coronet
197	"Beastly"	✓	✓	✓	N/A	September 14, 2018	Live episode from Brooklyn Academy of Music, New York
198	"Look Who's Talking Too"	✓	✓	✓	N/A	September 28, 2018	Live episode from the High Plains Comedy Festival, Denver
199	"A Night in Heaven"	✓	×	✓	Jen D'Angelo; Tawny Newsome	October 12, 2018	Live episode from Largo at the Coronet
200	"Action Jackson"	✓	✓	✓	Seth Rogen	October 26, 2018	Live episode from Largo at the Coronet
201	"Skyscraper"	✓	×	✓	River Butcher; Paul F. Tompkins	November 9, 2018	N/A
202	"Look Who's Talking Now"	✓	✓	✓	Conan O'Brien	November 23, 2018	N/A
203	"Perfect Stranger"	✓	✓	✓	N/A	December 7, 2018	Live episode from the Death Becomes Us True Crime Festival, Washington, D.C.
204	"Holiday in Handcuffs"	✓	✓	✓	Jessica St. Clair	December 21, 2018	N/A
205	"Cellular"	✓	×	✓	Ike Barinholtz; Erin Gibson	January 17, 2019	N/A
206	"Little Italy"	✓	✓	✓	N/A	January 31, 2019	N/A
207	"Dragon Blade"	✓	×	✓	Daniel Radcliffe; Erin Darke	February 15, 2019	N/A
208	"Harry & Meghan: A Royal Romance"	✓	✓	✓	Casey Wilson	March 1, 2019	Live episode from Largo at the Coronet
209	"The Snowman"	✓	×	✓	Bryan Safi; Erin Gibson	March 15, 2019	Live episode from Largo at the Coronet
210	"Van Helsing"	✓	×	✓	Seth Rogen; Riki Lindhome; Ben Blacker	March 29, 2019	Live episode from Largo at the Coronet
211	"The Secret"	✓	×	✓	Topher Grace; Joel Kim Booster	April 12, 2019	N/A
212	"Hello Mary Lou: Prom Night II"	✓	✓	✓	Seth Rogen; Charlize Theron	April 26, 2019	Live episode from Largo at the Coronet
213	"Shanghai Surprise"	✓	✓	✓	Jordan Rubin	May 10, 2019	N/A
214	"Hercules"	✓	×	✓	Leslye Headland; Sasheer Zamata	May 24, 2019	Live episode from Largo at the Coronet
215	"The Country Bears"	✓	✓	✓	Kulap Vilaysack	June 7, 2019	N/A
216	"Serenity"	✓	✓	✓	Nick Kroll	June 21, 2019	Live episode from Austin City Limits Live at the Moody Theater
217	"Jaws 3-D"	✓	✓	✓	N/A	July 5, 2019	N/A
218	"Deadfall"	✓	✓	✓	Chelsea Peretti	July 19, 2019	Live episode from The Wiltern, Los Angeles
219	"Drop Dead Fred"	✓	✓	✓	Casey Wilson	August 2, 2019	Live episode from The Bell Theater, Los Angeles
220	"Hobbs & Shaw"	✓	×	✓	Nicole Byer; Adam Scott	August 16, 2019	Live episode from Largo at the Coronet
221	"The Hottie and the Nottie"	✓	✓	✓	N/A	August 30, 2019	Live episode from Gaillard Center, Charleston, SC
222	"Unforgettable"	✓	✓	✓	N/A	September 13, 2019	Live episode from Durham Performing Arts Center, Durham, NC
223	"Disclosure"	✓	×	✓	Nick Kroll; Emily Altman	September 27, 2019	N/A
224	"Starcrash"	✓	✓	✓	N/A	October 11, 2019	Live episode from Carpenter Theatre, Richmond, VA
225	"Friday the 13th Part VI: Jason Lives"	✓	✓	✓	N/A	October 25, 2019	Live episode from Zellerbach Hall, Berkeley, CA
226	"Body of Evidence"	✓	✓	✓	N/A	November 8, 2019	Live episode from DAR Constitution Hall, Washington, D.C.
227	"Double Dragon"	✓	✓	✓	N/A	November 22, 2019	Live episode from The Met, Philadelphia, PA
228	"High Strung"	✓	✓	✓	N/A	December 6, 2019	Live episode from Beacon Theatre, New York City
229	"The Spirit of Christmas"	✓	✓	✓	Jessica St. Clair	December 23, 2019	N/A
230	"Fateful Findings"	✓	✓	✓	Rob Huebel	January 3, 2020	Live episode from Moore Theatre, Seattle
231	"The Master of Disguise"	✓	✓	✓	N/A	January 17, 2020	Live episode from Beacon Theatre, New York City
232	"The Adventures of Pinocchio"	✓	✓	✓	N/A	January 31, 2020	Live episode from Chicago Theatre, Chicago
233	"Space Jam"	✓	✓	✓	N/A	February 14, 2020	Live episode from Chicago Theatre, Chicago
234	"Prelude to a Kiss"	✓	×	✓	Andy Greenwald; Chris Ryan	February 28, 2020	Crossover with The Watch podcast
235	"Underworld: Blood Wars"	✓	✓	✓	N/A	March 13, 2020	Live episode from The Chevalier Theatre, Medford, MA
236	"The Great Wall"	✓	✓	✓	N/A	March 27, 2020	Live episode from The Chevalier Theatre, Medford, MA
237	"Valerian and the City of a Thousand Planets"	✓	×	✓	Doug Benson; Jessica St. Clair	April 10, 2020	Live episode, recorded at the Theatre at Ace Hotel on December 10, 2017 for Pee Cast Blast 2017. Originally released exclusively on Stitcher Premium and re-released on the free feed on April 10, 2020.
238	"Bloodshot"	✓	✓	✓	Adam Scott	April 24, 2020	N/A
239	"Cool World"	✓	✓	✓	N/A	May 8, 2020	N/A
240	"Megaforce"	✓	✓	✓	N/A	May 22, 2020	Live episode from The Just for Laughs Festival, Montreal
241	"Ninja III: The Domination"	✓	✓	✓	N/A	June 5, 2020	N/A
242	"The Boyfriend School"	✓	✓	✓	N/A	June 19, 2020	N/A
243	"The Peanut Butter Solution"	✓	✓	✓	N/A	July 3, 2020	N/A
244	"My Demon Lover"	✓	✓	✓	N/A	July 17, 2020	N/A
245	"Money Plane"	✓	✓	✓	N/A	July 31, 2020	N/A
246	"Swordfish"	✓	✓	✓	N/A	August 14, 2020	Live episode from Paramount Theatre, Denver, CO
247	"2:22"	✓	✓	✓	N/A	August 28, 2020	Live episode from Keller Auditorium, Portland, OR
248	"The VelociPastor"	✓	✓	✓	N/A	September 11, 2020	N/A
N–A	"Transformers: Revenge of the Fallen"	✓	✓	✓	N/A	September 23, 2020	Not released on regular feed. Only available as a download from the HDTGM website.
249	"Deadly Mile High Club"	✓	✓	✓	N/A	September 25, 2020	N/A
250	"Under the Cherry Moon"	✓	✓	✓	N/A	October 9, 2020	N/A
251	"Breakin' 2: Electric Boogaloo"	✓	✓	✓	N/A	October 23, 2020	N/A
252	"Governor Gabbi"	✓	✓	✓	N/A	November 6, 2020	Live episode from Meridian Hall, Toronto
253	"Cats"	✓	✓	✓	N/A	November 20, 2020	Live virtual episode; Paul F. Tompkins and Seth Rogen make brief guest appearances
254	"Love's Labour's Lost"	✓	✓	✓	N/A	December 4, 2020	N/A
255	"A Very Nutty Christmas"	✓	✓	✓	Jessica St. Clair	December 18, 2020	Live virtual episode
N–A	"The Knight Before Christmas"	✓	✓	✓	Jessica St. Clair	N/A (live episode aired Dec. 18, 2020)	Live virtual episode later released to the regular feed on December 24th, 2021.
256	"Burlesque"	✓	✓	✓	Nick Kroll	December 31, 2020	This was a re-release of the 1st HDTGM episode with new content from the hosts in the introduction to belatedly commemorate the podcast's 10-year anniversary
257	"A Gnome Named Gnorm"	✓	✓	✓	N/A	January 15, 2021	N/A
258	"Lawnmower Man 2: Beyond Cyberspace"	✓	✓	✓	N/A	January 29, 2021	N/A
259	"Holy Matrimony"	✓	✓	✓	N/A	February 12, 2021	Live episode from SF Masonic Auditorium, San Francisco
260	"Jade"	✓	✓	✓	N/A	February 26, 2021	N/A
261	"A Talking Cat!?!"	✓	×	✓	Jessica St. Clair	March 12, 2021	N/A
262	"Zack Snyder's Justice League"	✓	×	✓	Griffin Newman; David Sims	March 26, 2021	Crossover with Blank Check podcast
263	"The January Man"	✓	×	✓	Kulap Vilaysack	April 9, 2021	N/A
264	"The Visitor"	✓	✓	✓	Rob Huebel	April 23, 2021	Live episode from Moore Theatre, Seattle
265	"Supergirl"	✓	✓	✓	Brie Larson	May 7, 2021	N/A
266	"Tammy and the T-Rex"	✓	✓	✓	N/A	May 21, 2021	Live virtual episode
267	"Abraxas, Guardian of the Universe"	✓	✓	✓	N/A	June 4, 2021	Live episode from Queen Elizabeth Theatre, Vancouver
268	"Tough Guys Don't Dance"	✓	✓	✓	N/A	June 18, 2021	N/A
269	"Replicas"	✓	✓	✓	N/A	July 2, 2021	N/A
270	"The 6th Day"	✓	✓	✓	N/A	July 16, 2021	N/A
271	"F9"	✓	✓	✓	Adam Scott	July 30, 2021	N/A
272	"Surrogates"	✓	✓	✓	N/A	August 13, 2021	N/A
273	"The Island"	✓	✓	✓	N/A	August 27, 2021	N/A
274	"The Dirt Bike Kid"	✓	✓	✓	N/A	September 10, 2021	N/A
275	"Bugsy Malone"	✓	×	✓	Jessica St. Clair	September 24, 2021	N/A
276	"Malignant"	✓	✓	✓	N/A	October 7, 2021	N/A
277	"Uninvited"	✓	×	✓	N/A	October 21, 2021	N/A
278	"Old"	✓	✓	✓	N/A	November 5, 2021	N/A
279	"Made in Heaven"	✓	✓	✓	N/A	November 19, 2021	N/A
280	"Holiday in Handcuffs"	✓	✓	✓	Jessica St. Clair	December 2, 2021	Re-release of the 12/21/18 episode
281	"Snowmance"	✓	✓	✓	N/A	December 17, 2021	N/A
282	"The Knight Before Christmas"	✓	✓	✓	Jessica St. Clair	December 24, 2021	Official release of live virtual episode previously not released on regular feed.
283	"Babes in Toyland"	✓	✓	✓	N/A	December 31, 2021	Live at Largo at the Coronet
284	"Shadow in the Cloud"	✓	✓	✓	N/A	January 14, 2022	N/A
285	"Voyage of the Rock Aliens"	✓	✓	✓	N/A	January 28, 2022	N/A
286	"Kate & Leopold"	✓	✓	✓	N/A	February 11, 2022	N/A
287	"Killing Me Softly"	✓	✓	✓	N/A	February 25, 2022	N/A
288	"Dancin': It's On!"	✓	✓	✓	N/A	March 11, 2022	N/A
289	"Shattered"	✓	✓	✓	N/A	March 25, 2022	N/A
290	"Stone Cold"	✓	✓	✓	N/A	April 8, 2022	Live at Largo at the Coronet
291	"Diana: The Musical"	✓	✓	✓	N/A	April 22, 2022	Live at Largo at the Coronet
292	"A Sound of Thunder"	✓	✓	✓	N/A	May 6, 2022	Live at Largo at the Coronet
293	"Grand Piano"	✓	✓	✓	N/A	May 20, 2022	N/A
294	"Moonfall"	✓	✓	✓	N/A	June 3, 2022	Live at Largo at the Coronet
295	"Until We Meet Again"	✓	✓	✓	N/A	June 23, 2022	N/A
296	"Tuff Turf"	✓	✓	✓	N/A	July 8, 2022	N/A
297	"The Legend of The Stardust Brothers"	✓	✓	✓	N/A	July 22, 2022	Live at Largo at the Coronet
298	"Music from Another Room"	✓	✓	✓	N/A	August 4, 2022	N/A
299	"Love on a Leash"	✓	✓	✓	Jessica St. Clair	August 18, 2022	Live virtual episode
300	"Hard Target"	✓	✓	✓	N/A	September 2, 2022	Live episode from the Fillmore Theater in New Orleans
301	"Open Windows"	✓	✓	✓	N/A	September 16, 2022	Live episode from the 713 Music Hall in Houston
302	"An American Werewolf in Paris"	✓	✓	✓	N/A	September 30, 2022	Live episode from the Winspear Opera House in Dallas
303	"Wish Upon"	✓	✓	✓	N/A	October 14, 2022	Live episode from Largo at the Coronet
304	"Dracula 2000"	✓	✓	✓	N/A	October 28, 2022	N/A
305	"Designed to Kill"	✓	✓	✓	N/A	November 11, 2022	Live episode from the Murat Theatre in Indianapolis
306	"The Oogieloves in the Big Balloon Adventure"	✓	✓	✓	N/A	November 25, 2022	Live episode from the Fillmore in Detroit
307	"12 Pups of Christmas"	✓	✓	✓	N/A	December 9, 2022	Live episode from SF Masonic Auditorium, San Francisco
308	"Ghost in the Machine"	✓	✓	✓	N/A	December 23, 2022	Live episode from the MGM in Northfield
309	"Morbius"	✓	✓	✓	N/A	January 5, 2023	Live episode from the Chicago Theatre
310	"Open Marriage"	✓	✓	✓	N/A	January 20, 2023	N/A
311	"Wild Mountain Thyme"	✓	✓	✓	N/A	February 3, 2023	N/A
312	"Fast X Trailer Reaction"	✓	×	✓	N/A	February 16, 2023	N/A
313	"The Number 23"	✓	✓	✓	N/A	February 23, 2023	N/A
314	"Ski School"	✓	✓	✓	Rob Huebel	March 9, 2023	Live episode from the Telluride Comedy Festival
315	"Ambulance"	✓	✓	✓	Roxane Gay	March 23, 2023	Live episode from Largo at the Coronet
316	"The Specialist"	✓	✓	✓	Nicole Byer	April 7, 2023	Live episode from Largo at the Coronet
317	"View from the Top"	✓	✓	✓	N/A	April 21, 2023	N/A
318	"Torque"	✓	✓	✓	Jon Gabrus	May 5, 2023	Live episode from Largo at the Coronet
319	"The Fast and the Furious"	✓	✓	✓	Seth Rogen	May 18, 2023	Live episode from Largo at the Coronet
320	"Fast X"	✓	✓	✓	Seth Rogen; Evan Goldberg	June 2, 2023	Live episode from Largo at the Coronet
321	"Milk Money"	✓	✓	✓	Casey Wilson	June 16, 2023	Live episode from Largo at the Coronet
322	"Hypnotic"	✓	✓	✓	N/A	June 29, 2023	Live episode from Largo at the Coronet
323	"Sleepover"	✓	✓	✓	Nick Kroll	July 13, 2023	Live episode from Largo at the Coronet
324	"The Journey: Absolution"	✓	✓	✓	Jessica St. Clair	July 27, 2023	Live episode from Largo at the Coronet
325	"Hangman"	✓	✓	✓	N/A	August 10, 2023	N/A
326	"Switch"	✓	✓	✓	Jessica St. Clair	August 25, 2023	Live episode from the Wilbur Theatre, Boston
327	"The First Power"	✓	✓	✓	N/A	September 8, 2023	Live episode from The Chevalier Theatre, Medford, MA
328	"Jonathan Livingston Seagull"	✓	✓	✓	N/A	September 22, 2023	Live episode from Beacon Theatre, New York City
329	"Bats"	✓	✓	✓	Ike Barinholtz	October 6, 2023	Live episode from Largo at the Coronet
330	"The Pope's Exorcist"	✓	✓	✓	N/A	October 20, 2023	Live episode from Largo at the Coronet
331	"New York Ninja"	✓	✓	✓	N/A	November 3, 2023	Live episode from the Count Basie Center for the Arts, Red Bank, New Jersey
332	"Munchies"	✓	✓	✓	N/A	November 17, 2023	Live episode from the Warner Theatre, Washington, D.C.
333	"The Dog Who Saved Christmas"	✓	✓	✓	N/A	November 30, 2023	Live episode from the Riviera Theatre, Chicago, Illinois
334	"A Beauty and the Beast Christmas"	✓	✓	✓	N/A	December 14, 2023	Live episode from the Pantages Theatre, Minneapolis, Minnesota
335	"Dungeons & Dragons"	✓	✓	✓	N/A	December 29, 2023	Live episode from the Miller Theater, Philadelphia, Pennsylvania
336	"The King's Daughter"	✓	✓	✓	N/A	January 12, 2024	Live episode from the State Theatre, Portland, ME
337	"Rollerball"	✓	✓	✓	N/A	January 25, 2024	Live episode from the VETS, Providence, RI
338	"Fifty Shades of Grey"	✓	✓	✓	Jessica St. Clair	February 8, 2024	Live episode from Largo at the Coronet
339	"Beautiful Disaster"	✓	✓	✓	N/A	February 22, 2024	Live episode from the College Street Music Hall, New Haven, CT
340	"Fifty Shades Darker"	✓	×	✓	Joel Kim Booster	March 7, 2024	Live episode from Largo at the Coronet
341	"Ronal the Barbarian"	✓	✓	✓	N/A	March 21, 2024	Live episode from the BAM, Brooklyn, NY
342	"Fifty Shades Freed"	✓	×	✓	Chelsea Devantez	April 5, 2024	Live episode from Largo at the Coronet
343	"Samurai Cop"	✓	✓	✓	N/A	April 19, 2024	Live episode from SF Masonic Auditorium, San Francisco, CA
344	"The Beekeeper"	✓	✓	✓	N/A	May 3, 2024	Live episode from Hackney Empire, London, UK
345	"The Ugly Truth"	✓	✓	✓	N/A	May 17, 2024	Live episode from O2 Academy, Glasgow, UK
346	"Madame Web"	✓	✓	✓	N/A	May 31, 2024	Live episode from Largo at the Coronet
347	"Merlin: The Return"	✓	✓	✓	N/A	June 14, 2024	Live episode from Ulster Hall, Belfast, UK
348	"The Happening"	✓	✓	✓	N/A	June 28, 2024	Live episode from the Netflix is a Joke Festival, Los Angeles, CA
349	"Shark Attack 3:Megalodon"	✓	✓	✓	N/A	July 12, 2024	Live episode from Hackney Empire, London, UK
350	"Bait 3D"	✓	✓	✓	N/A	July 26, 2024	Live episode from the 'Sconset Casino, Nantucket
351	"Thunderpants"	✓	✓	✓	N/A	August 9, 2024	Live episode from Vicar Street, Dublin, Ireland
352	"Beautiful Wedding"	✓	✓	✓	N/A	August 23, 2024	Live episode from Largo at the Coronet
353	"Troll"	✓	✓	✓	N/A	September 6, 2024	N/A
354	"Troll 2"	✓	✓	✓	Adam Scott	September 20, 2024	Virtual live show
355	"Communion"	✓	✓	✓	N/A	October 4, 2024	Live episode from the Wilbur Theatre, Boston
356	"Trap"	✓	✓	✓	Blakely Thornton	October 18, 2024	Live episode from Largo at the Coronet
357	"Eye of the Beholder"	✓	✓	✓	Joe Mande	November 1, 2024	N/A
358	"Q: The Winged Serpent"	✓	✓	✓	N/A	November 15, 2024	Live episode from Largo at the Coronet
359	"Dream a Little Dream"	✓	✓	✓	James Acaster	November 29, 2024	Live episode from Largo at the Coronet
360	"Christmas Mail"	✓	✓	✓	Jessica St. Clair	December 13, 2024	N/A
361	"Bad Boys: Ride or Die"	✓	✓	✓	N/A	December 27, 2024	Live episode from Miller Theater, Philadelphia
362	"Megalopolis"	✓	✓	✓	N/A	January 23, 2025	Live episode from New York Comedy Festival at Town Hall
363	"Passion Play"	✓	✓	✓	N/A	February 6, 2025	N/A
364	"The League of Extraordinary Gentlemen"	✓	✓	✓	N/A	February 20, 2025	N/A
365	"Doppelganger"	✓	✓	✓	N/A	March 6, 2025	N/A
366	"This Is Me... Now: A Love Story"	✓	✓	✓	N/A	March 20, 2025	N/A
367	"Jill Rips"	✓	✓	✓	N/A	April 3, 2025	Live episode from Largo at the Coronet
368	"Kraven the Hunter"	✓	✓	✓	Jessica St. Clair	April 17, 2025	Live episode from Moody Theater Austin, TX
369	"Double Trouble"	✓	x	✓	Jessica St. Clair; Rory Scovel	May 1, 2025	Live episode from Paramount Theatre, Denver, CO
370	"The Arrival"	✓	✓	✓	N/A	May 15, 2025	Live episode from Largo at the Coronet
371	"Sinbad of the Seven Seas"	✓	x	✓	Jessica St. Clair	May 29, 2025	Live episode from Treefort Music Fest, Boise, ID
372	"You Got Served"	✓	✓	✓	N/A	June 12, 2025	Live episode from Largo at the Coronet
373	"Surf II"	✓	x	✓	Jessica St. Clair	June 26, 2025	Live episode from Paramount Theatre, Seattle, WA
374	"Oscar"	✓	✓	✓	N/A	July 10, 2025	Live episode from Massey Hall, Toronto, ON
375	"Expend4bles"	✓	x	✓	Jessica St. Clair	July 24, 2025	Live episode from SF Masonic Auditorium, San Francisco, CA
376	"Driven"	✓	✓	✓	N/A	August 7, 2025	Live episode from Queen Elizabeth Theatre, Vancouver, BC
377	"Champagne and Bullets"	✓	x	✓	Jessica St. Clair	August 21, 2025	Live episode from Arlene Schnitzer Concert Hall, Portland, OR
378	"War of the Worlds"	✓	✓	✓	N/A	September 4, 2025	N/A
379	"Jack's Back"	✓	x	✓	Lisa Gilroy	September 18, 2025	Live episode from Largo at the Coronet
380	"Grizzly II: Revenge"	✓	x	✓	Jake Johnson	October 3, 2025	N/A
381	"Friday the 13th Part VIII: Jason Takes Manhattan"	✓	✓	✓	N/A	October 17, 2025	N/A
382	"Ghosts of Mars"	✓	✓	✓	Nick Kroll	October 31, 2025	Live episode from Largo at the Coronet
383	"My Boyfriend's Back"	✓	✓	✓	N/A	November 14, 2025	Live episode from Largo at the Coronet
384	"The Christmas Tree"	✓	✓	✓	N/A	November 28, 2025	N/A
385	"Merry Kissmas"	✓	✓	✓	Jessica St. Clair	December 12, 2025	Holiday Livestream
386	"My Secret Santa"	✓	✓	✓	N/A	December 26, 2025	N/A
387	"The 3rd “Annual” Howdie Awards (Part 1)"	✓	✓	✓	N/A	December 29, 2025	N/A
388	"The 3rd “Annual” Howdie Awards (Part 2)"	✓	✓	✓	N/A	December 29, 2025	N/A
389	"Monkeybone"	✓	x	✓	Rob Huebel	January 16, 2026	Live in New York City at NY Comedy Festival
390	"Return to Oz"	✓	✓	✓	N/A	January 30, 2026	N/A
391	"Date with an Angel"	✓	✓	✓	N/A	February 12, 2026	Live episode from Pantages Theatre, Minneapolis, MN
392	"Shoot 'Em Up"	✓	✓	✓	N/A	February 26, 2026	N/A
393	"Law Abiding Citizen"	✓	x	✓	Adam Pally	March 12, 2026	N/A
394	"The Forbidden Dance"	✓	✓	✓	N/A	March 26, 2026	N/A
395	"Mindhunters"	✓	✓	✓	N/A	April 10, 2026	N/A
396	"Live Wire"	✓	x	✓	Johnny Knoxville & Nicole Byer	April 24, 2026	Live episode from Largo at the Coronet
397	"The Big Hit"	✓	✓	✓	N/A	May 8, 2026	N/A
398	"Drop Zone"	✓	✓	✓	N/A	May 22, 2026	N/A
399	"The Manitou"	✓	x	✓	Jessica St. Clair	June 4, 2026	N/A
400	"Circus Island"	✓	✓	✓	N/A	June 18, 2026	Live episode from Largo at the Coronet
401	"Vertical Limit"	✓	x	✓	Laci Mosley	July 2, 2026	N/A
402	"Thrashin'"	✓	✓	✓	N/A	July 16, 2026	N/A
403	"Fall"	✓	✓	✓	N/A	July 30, 2026	N/A
404	"xXx"	✓	✓	x	Rob Huebel	August 13, 2026	Live episode from Largo at the Coronet
405	"The Legend of Billie Jean"	✓	✓	✓	N/A	August 27, 2026	Live episode from Largo at the Coronet
406	"Jack"	✓	✓	✓	N/A	September 10, 2026	N/A
407	"The Lair of the White Worm"	✓	✓	✓	N/A	September 24, 2026	N/A
408	"Happy Birthday to Me"	✓	✓	✓	N/A	October 8, 2026	N/A
409	"Seed of Chucky"	✓	✓	✓	N/A	October 29, 2026	N/A
410	"Meet the Deedles"	✓	✓	✓	N/A	November 9, 2026	N/A

== Mini episodes ==
Episode	Episode title	Release date	Notes
0	"Minisode 0"	December 10, 2010	N/A
1.5	"Minisode 1.5"	January 7, 2011	N/A
2.5	"Minisode 2.5"	January 19, 2011	N/A
3.5	"Minisode 3.5"	February 2, 2011	N/A
4.5	"Minisode 4.5"	February 21, 2011	N/A
5.5	"Minisode 5.5"	March 7, 2011	N/A
6.5	"Minisode 6.5"	March 22, 2011	N/A
7.5	"Minisode 7.5"	April 11, 2011	N/A
8.5	"Minisode 8.5"	April 19, 2011	N/A
9.5	"Minisode 9.5"	May 16, 2011	N/A
10.5	"Minisode 10.5"	May 24, 2011	N/A
11.5	"Minisode 11.5"	June 7, 2011	N/A
12.5	"Minisode 12.5"	June 21, 2011	N/A
13.5	"Minisode 13.5"	July 5, 2011	N/A
14.5	"Minisode 14.5"	July 19, 2011	N/A
15.5	"Minisode 15.5"	August 2, 2011	Howl.fm exclusive
16.5	"Minisode 16.5"	August 16, 2011	N/A
17.5	"Minisode 17.5"	August 30, 2011	N/A
18.5	"Minisode 18.5"	September 20, 2011	N/A
19.5	"Minisode 19.5"	September 30, 2011	N/A
20.5	"Minisode 20.5"	October 11, 2011	N/A
21.5	"Minisode 21.5"	October 25, 2011	N/A
22.5	"Minisode 22.5"	November 8, 2011	N/A
23.5	"Minisode 23.5"	November 22, 2011	N/A
24.5	"Minisode 24.5"	December 13, 2011	N/A
25.5	"Christmas Minisode"	December 20, 2011	N/A
26.5	"Minisode 26.5"	December 27, 2011	N/A
27.5	"Minisode 27.5"	January 10, 2012	N/A
28.5	"Minisode 28.5"	January 24, 2012	N/A
29.5	"Minisode 29.5"	February 7, 2012	N/A
30.5	"Minisode 30.5"	February 21, 2012	First live minisode
31.5	"Minisode 31.5"	March 6, 2012	N/A
32.5	"Minisode 32.5"	March 20, 2012	N/A
33.5	"Minisode 33.5"	April 3, 2012	Guests: Lennon Parham and Jessica St. Clair
34.5	"Minisode 34.5"	April 17, 2012	N/A
35.5	"Minisode 35.5"	May 8, 2012	N/A
36.5	"Minisode 36.5"	May 29, 2012	N/A
39.5	"Minisode 39.5"	June 26, 2012	N/A
40.5	"Minisode 40.5"	July 10, 2012	N/A
41.5	"Minisode 41.5"	July 31, 2012	N/A
42.5	"Minisode 42.5"	August 14, 2012	N/A
43.5	"Minisode 43.5"	August 28, 2012	N/A
44.5	"Minisode 44.5"	September 11, 2012	N/A
45.5	"Minisode 45.5"	September 25, 2012	N/A
46.5	"Minisode 46.5"	October 9, 2012	N/A
47.5	"Minisode 47.5"	October 23, 2012	N/A
48.5	"Minisode 48.5"	November 6, 2012	N/A
49.5	"Minisode 49.5"	November 20, 2012	N/A
50.5	"Minisode 50.5"	December 4, 2012	Guest: Jason Woliner
51.5	"Minisode 51.5"	December 18, 2012	N/A
52.5	"Minisode 52.5"	January 1, 2013	N/A
53.5	"Minisode 53.5"	January 15, 2013	N/A
54.5	"Minisode 54.5"	January 29, 2013	N/A
55.5	"Minisode 55.5"	February 12, 2013	N/A
56.5	"Minisode 56.5"	February 26, 2013	N/A
57.5	"Minisode 57.5"	March 12, 2013	N/A
58.5	"Minisode 58.5"	March 26, 2013	N/A
59.5	"Minisode 59.5"	April 9, 2013	N/A
60.5	"Minisode 60.5"	April 23, 2013	N/A
61.5	"Minisode 61.5"	May 7, 2013	N/A
62.5	"Minisode 62.5"	May 21, 2013	N/A
63.5	"Minisode 63.5"	June 4, 2013	N/A
64.5	"Minisode 64.5"	June 18, 2013	N/A
65.5	"Minisode 65.5"	July 2, 2013	N/A
67.5	"Minisode 67.5"	July 23, 2013	N/A
68.5	"Minisode 68.5"	August 6, 2013	Guest: Joseph Sargent
69.5	"Minisode 69.5"	August 20, 2013	N/A
70.5	"Minisode 70.5"	September 3, 2013	N/A
71.5	"Minisode 71.5"	September 17, 2013	N/A
72.5	"Minisode 72.5"	October 1, 2013	N/A
73.5	"Minisode 73.5"	October 16, 2013	N/A
74.5	"Minisode 74.5"	October 29, 2013	N/A
75.5	"Minisode 75.5"	November 12, 2013	N/A
76.5	"Minisode 76.5"	November 26, 2013	N/A
77.5	"Minisode 77.5"	December 10, 2013	N/A
78.5	"Minisode 78.5"	December 24, 2013	N/A
79.5	"Minisode 79.5"	January 7, 2014	N/A
80.5	"Minisode 80.5"	January 21, 2014	N/A
81.5	"Minisode 81.5"	February 5, 2014	N/A
82.5	"Minisode 82.5"	February 19, 2014	N/A
83.5	"Minisode 83.5"	March 11, 2014	N/A
84.5	"Minisode 84.5"	April 8, 2014	Guest: Matt Walsh
85.5	"Minisode 85.5"	May 6, 2014	N/A
86.5	"Minisode 86.5"	June 3, 2014	N/A
87.5	"Minisode 87.5"	July 1, 2014	N/A
88.5	"Minisode 88.5"	July 16, 2014	Guest: Peter Fonda
89.5	"Minisode 89.5"	July 29, 2014	N/A
90.5	"Minisode 90.5"	August 12, 2014	N/A
92.5	"Minisode 92.5"	September 2, 2014	N/A
93.5	"Minisode 93.5"	September 16, 2014	N/A
94.5	"Minisode 94.5"	September 30, 2014	N/A
95.5	"Minisode 95.5"	October 15, 2014	N/A
96.5	"Minisode 96.5"	October 31, 2014	N/A
97.5	"Minisode 97.5"	November 14, 2014	N/A
98.5	"Minisode 98.5"	December 5, 2014	N/A
99.5	"Minisode 99.5"	December 22, 2014	Guest: June Diane Raphael
100.5	"Minisode 100.5"	January 6, 2015	N/A
101.5	"Minisode 101.5"	January 20, 2015	N/A
102.5	"Minisode 102.5"	January 31, 2015	N/A
104.5	"Minisode 104.5"	February 27, 2015	N/A
105.5	"Minisode 105.5"	March 13, 2015	N/A
106.5	"Minisode 106.5"	March 27, 2015	N/A
107.5	"Minisode 107.5"	April 10, 2015	N/A
108.5	"Minisode 108.5"	April 27, 2015	N/A
109.5	"Minisode 109.5"	May 10, 2015	N/A
110.5	"Minisode 110.5"	May 22, 2015	N/A
111.5	"Minisode 111.5"	June 6, 2015	N/A
112.5	"Minisode 112.5"	June 21, 2015	N/A
113.5	"Minisode 113.5"	July 3, 2015	N/A
114.5	"Minisode 114.5"	July 17, 2015	N/A
115.5	"Minisode 115.5"	August 4, 2015	N/A
116.5	"Minisode 116.5"	August 17, 2015	N/A
117.5	"Minisode 117.5"	August 28, 2015	N/A
118.5	"Minisode 118.5"	September 11, 2015	N/A
119.5	"Minisode 119.5"	September 25, 2015	N/A
120.5	"Minisode 120.5"	October 9, 2015	N/A
121.5	"Minisode 121.5"	October 26, 2015	N/A
122.5	"Minisode 122.5"	November 6, 2015	N/A
123.5	"Minisode 123.5"	November 21, 2015	N/A
124.5	"Minisode 124.5"	December 4, 2015	N/A
125.5	"Minisode 125.5"	December 21, 2015	N/A
126.5	"Minisode 126.5"	January 6, 2016	N/A
127.5	"Minisode 127.5"	January 18, 2016	N/A
128.5	"Minisode 128.5"	February 2, 2016	N/A
129.5	"Minisode 129.5"	February 16, 2016	N/A
130.5	"Minisode 130.5"	March 2, 2016	N/A
131.5	"Minisode 131.5"	March 16, 2016	N/A
132.5	"Minisode 132.5"	March 28, 2016	N/A
133.5	"Minisode 133.5"	April 8, 2016	N/A
134.5	"Minisode 134.5"	April 22, 2016	N/A
135.5	"Minisode 135.5"	May 6, 2016	N/A
136.5	"Minisode 136.5"	May 22, 2016	N/A
Bonus	"A Conversation with Mel Brooks"	May 26, 2016	Mel Brooks discusses Solarbabies
137.5	"Minisode 137.5"	June 4, 2016	The minisode stated that the next show would cover Dragonheart but by the actual episode the hosts had decided to discuss The Boy Next Door instead.
138.5	"Minisode 138.5"	June 20, 2016	N/A
139.5	"Minisode 139.5"	July 5, 2016	Guest: Mark Tarlov
140.5	"Minisode 140.5"	July 15, 2016	Guest: Stewart Raffill
141.5	"Minisode 141.5"	August 1, 2016	N/A
142.5	"Minisode 142.5"	August 15, 2016	Includes interview with Simon Wincer, director of The Phantom
143.5	"Minisode 143.5"	September 9, 2016	N/A
144.5	"Minisode 144.5"	September 26, 2016	N/A
145.5	"Minisode 145.5"	October 11, 2016	N/A
146.5	"Minisode 146.5"	October 21, 2016	Includes interview with Lawrence Kasdan's office assistant during the production of Dreamcatcher
147.5	"Minisode 147.5"	November 5, 2016	N/A
148.5	"Minisode 148.5"	November 18, 2016	N/A
149.5	"Minisode 149.5"	December 2, 2016	Includes interview with Brett Leonard, director of The Lawnmower Man
150.1	"Bonus episode 150.1"	December 6, 2016	Bonus interview with Brian Taylor, director of Crank and Gamer
152.5	"Minisode 152.5"	December 30, 2016	N/A
153.5	"Minisode 153.5"	January 13, 2017	Includes interview with Coleman Luck, writer of the first draft of the script for Escape from L.A.
153.6	"Paywall Special Announcement"	January 19, 2017	N/A
154.5	"Minisode 154.5"	January 30, 2017	Includes interview clips with Russell Mulcahy about the production and release of Highlander
155.5	"Minisode 155.5"	February 10, 2017	Includes interview clips with Shane McDermott about Airborne
156.5	"Minisode 156.5"	February 24, 2017	Includes interview clips with Vinnie DeGenarro, Vin Diesel's body double for xXx: Return of Xander Cage
Origins1	"Origin Stories Bonus: Dan Gordon"	March 1, 2017	Includes interview with Dan Gordon
157.5	"Minisode 157.5"	March 10, 2017	Includes interview clips with Nicolas Cowan and Ernie Reyes, Jr. about Surf Ninjas
158.5	"Minisode 158.5"	March 24, 2017	Includes e-mail interview responses from director Eric Red about Body Parts
159.5	"Minisode 159.5"	April 7, 2017	Includes interview clips with Mick Garris, director of Sleepwalkers
160.5	"Minisode 160.5"	April 21, 2017	Includes interview clips with Michael Paré about Streets of Fire
161.5	"Minisode 161.5"	May 5, 2017	N/A
162.5	"Minisode 162.5"	May 19, 2017	N/A
163.5	"Minisode 163.5"	June 2, 2017	N/A
164.5	"Minisode 164.5"	June 15, 2017	N/A
165.5	"Minisode 165.5"	June 30, 2017	N/A
166.5	"Minisode 166.5"	July 14, 2017	N/A
167.5	"Minisode 167.5"	July 28, 2017	N/A
168.5	"Minisode 168.5"	August 11, 2017	N/A
169.5	"Minisode 169.5"	August 25, 2017	N/A
Origins2	"Origin Stories Bonus: Michael Paré"	September 17, 2017	Includes interview with Michael Paré
170.5	"Minisode 170.5"	September 8, 2017	N/A
171.5	"Minisode 171.5"	September 22, 2017	N/A
172.5	"Minisode 172.5"	October 6, 2017	N/A
173.5	"Minisode 173.5"	October 20, 2017	N/A
174.5	"Minisode 174.5"	November 3, 2017	N/A
175.5	"Minisode 175.5"	November 17, 2017	N/A
176.5	"Minisode 176.5"	December 1, 2017	N/A
177.5	"Minisode 177.5"	December 15, 2017	N/A
178.5	"Minisode 178.5"	December 29, 2017	N/A
179.5	"Minisode 179.5"	January 12, 2018	N/A
180.5	"Minisode 180.5"	January 26, 2018	N/A
181.5	"Minisode 181.5"	February 9, 2018	N/A
182.5	"Prequel to Episode 183"	February 23, 2018	N/A
183.5	"Prequel to Episode 184"	March 9, 2018	N/A
184.5	"Prequel to Episode 185"	March 23, 2018	N/A
185.5	"Prequel to Episode 186"	April 6, 2018	N/A
Origins3	"Origin Stories Bonus: Jon Cryer"	April 18, 2017	Includes interview with Jon Cryer
186.5	"Prequel to Episode 187"	April 20, 2018	N/A
187.5	"Prequel to Episode 188"	May 4, 2018	N/A
188.5	"Prequel to Episode 189"	May 17, 2018	N/A
189.5	"Prequel to Episode 190"	May 31, 2018	N/A
190.5	"Prequel to Episode 191"	June 15, 2018	N/A
191.5	"Prequel to Episode 192"	June 29, 2018	N/A
192.5	"Prequel to Episode 193"	July 13, 2018	N/A
193.5	"Prequel to Episode 194"	July 27, 2018	N/A
194.5	"Prequel to Episode 195"	August 10, 2018	N/A
195.5	"Prequel to Episode 196"	August 24, 2018	N/A
196.5	"Prequel to Episode 197"	September 7, 2018	N/A
197.5	"Prequel to Episode 198"	September 21, 2018	N/A
198.5	"Prequel to Episode 199"	October 5, 2018	N/A
199.5	"Prequel to Episode 200"	October 19, 2018	N/A
200.5	"200th Mini Retrospective Clip Show Spectacular"	November 2, 2018	A celebration of 200 episodes of HDTGM, including listener's favorite moments, hosts favorites memories, the favorite 5 episodes, the most hated movie, and favorite catchphrase
201.5	"Prequel to Episode 202"	November 16, 2018	N/A
202.5	"Prequel to Episode 203"	November 30, 2018	N/A
203.5	"Prequel to Episode 204"	December 14, 2018	N/A
204.5	"Prequel to Episode 205"	January 11, 2019	N/A
205.5	"Prequel to Episode 206"	January 25, 2019	N/A
206.5	"Prequel to Episode 207"	February 8, 2019	Includes a breakdown of the Hobbs & Shaw trailer by Paul and Jason
207.5	"Prequel to Episode 208"	February 22, 2019	N/A
208.5	"Prequel to Episode 209"	March 8, 2019	N/A
209.5	"Prequel to Episode 210"	March 22, 2019	N/A
210.5	"Prequel to Episode 211"	April 5, 2019	N/A
211.5	"Prequel to Episode 212"	April 19, 2019	N/A
212.5	"Prequel to Episode 213"	May 3, 2019	N/A
213.5	"Prequel to Episode 214"	May 17, 2019	N/A
214.5	"Prequel to Episode 215"	May 31, 2019	N/A
215.5	"Prequel to Episode 216"	June 14, 2019	N/A
216.5	"Prequel to Episode 217"	June 28, 2019	N/A
217.5	"Prequel to Episode 218"	July 12, 2019	N/A
218.5	"Prequel to Episode 219"	July 26, 2019	N/A
219.5	"Prequel to Episode 220"	August 9, 2019	Includes a deleted clip from the Drop Dead Fred episode
220.5	"Prequel to Episode 221"	August 23, 2019	Includes a deleted clip from the Hobbs & Shaw episode
Bonus	"Represent: The Woman's Guide to Running for Office and Changing the World"	September 3, 2019	June and her co-author Kate Black discuss their new book
221.5	"Prequel to Episode 222"	September 6, 2019	N/A
222.5	"Prequel to Episode 223"	September 20, 2019	Includes a deleted clip from the Unforgettable episode
223.5	"Prequel to Episode 224"	October 4, 2019	N/A
224.5	"Prequel to Episode 225"	October 18, 2019	Includes a deleted clip from the Starcrash episode
225.5	"Prequel to Episode 226"	November 1, 2019	Includes a deleted clip from the Friday the 13th Part VI: Jason Lives episode
226.5	"Prequel to Episode 227"	November 15, 2019	N/A
227.5	"Prequel to Episode 228"	November 29, 2019	Includes a deleted clip from the Double Dragon episode
228.5	"Prequel to Episode 229"	December 13, 2019	N/A
230.5	"Prequel to Episode 231"	January 10, 2020	N/A
231.5	"Prequel to Episode 232"	January 24, 2020	Includes a deleted clip from The Master of Disguise episode
232.5	"Minisode 232.5"	February 7, 2020	Includes a deleted clip from The Adventures of Pinocchio episode and a breakdown of the F9 trailer by Paul and Jason
233.5	"Minisode 233.5"	February 21, 2020	Includes a deleted clip from the Space Jam episode
234.5	"Minisode 234.5"	March 6, 2020	N/A
235.5	"Minisode 235.5"	March 20, 2020	Includes a deleted clip from the Underworld: Blood Wars episode
236.5	"Minisode 236.5"	April 3, 2020	Includes a deleted clip from The Great Wall episode
237.5	"Minisode 237.5"	April 17, 2020	N/A
238.5	"Minisode 238.5"	May 1, 2020	Includes a deleted clip from the Bloodshot episode
239.5	"Minisode 239.5"	May 15, 2020	N/A
240.5	"Minisode 240.5"	May 29, 2020	Includes a deleted clip from the Megaforce episode
241.5	"Minisode 241.5"	June 12, 2020	N/A
242.5	"Minisode 242.5"	June 26, 2020	N/A
243.5	"Minisode 243.5"	July 10, 2020	N/A
244.5	"Minisode 244.5"	July 24, 2020	N/A
245.5	"Minisode 245.5"	August 7, 2020	Includes interview with Andrew Lawrence, director of Money Plane
246.5	"Minisode 246.5"	August 21, 2020	N/A
247.5	"Minisode 247.5"	September 4, 2020	N/A
248.5	"Minisode 248.5"	September 18, 2020	N/A
Bonus	"The Jane Club with Shawnta Valdes and Neelamjit Dhaliwal"	September 27, 2020	June discusses the Jane Club with Jane Club's Chief Community Engagement Officer and Chief Equity and Inclusion Officer
249.5	"Minisode 249.5"	October 2, 2020	N/A
250.5	"Minisode 250.5"	October 16, 2020	N/A
251.5	"Minisode 251.5"	October 30, 2020	N/A
252.5	"Minisode 252.5"	November 13, 2020	N/A
253.5	"Minisode 253.5"	November 27, 2020	N/A
254.5	"Minisode 254.5"	December 10, 2020	N/A
256.5	"Minisode 256.5"	January 8, 2021	N/A
257.5	"Minisode 257.5"	January 22, 2021	Includes a deleted clip from the A Gnome Named Gnorm episode
258.5	"Minisode 258.5"	February 5, 2021	N/A
Bonus	"Scientology in Hollywood w/ Leah Remini and Mike Rinder"	February 14, 2021	N/A
259.5	"Minisode 259.5"	February 19, 2021	N/A
260.5	"Minisode 260.5"	March 5, 2021	N/A
261.5	"Minisode 261.5"	March 19, 2021	N/A
262.5	"Minisode 262.5"	April 2, 2021	N/A
263.5	"Minisode 263.5"	April 2, 2021	N/A
Bonus	"F9 Trailer Reaction w/ Paul and Jason"	April 20, 2021	Paul and Jason watch and react live to the movie trailer for F9
264.5	"Minisode 264.5"	April 30, 2021	N/A
265.5	"Minisode 265.5"	May 14, 2021	N/A
267.5	"Minisode 267.5"	June 11, 2021	N/A
268.5	"Minisode 268.5"	June 25, 2021	N/A
269.5	"Minisode 269.5"	July 9, 2021	N/A
270.5	"Minisode 270.5"	July 23, 2021	N/A
Bonus	"Vaccination Hesitation w/ Dr. Kate Grossman"	July 29, 2021	N/A
271.5	"Minisode 271.5"	August 6, 2021	N/A
272.5	"Minisode 272.5"	August 20, 2021	N/A
273.5	"Minisode 273.5"	September 3, 2021	N/A
274.5	"Minisode 274.5"	September 17, 2021	Includes a deleted clip from The Dirt Bike Kid episode
275.5	"Minisode 275.5"	September 30, 2021	N/A
276.5	"Malignant Minisode w/ Ed Brubaker"	October 15, 2021	Graphic novelist Ed Brubaker joins to chat with Paul and Jason
277.5	"Uninvited Minisode"	October 29, 2021	N/A
278.5	"Old Minisode"	November 12, 2021	N/A
279.5	"Made in Heaven Minisode"	November 26, 2021	N/A
280.5	"A Very Special Quar Chat-isode"	December 9, 2021	N/A
283.5	"Snowmance, The Knight Before Christmas, and Babes In Toyland Minisode"	January 7, 2022	N/A
284.5	"Shadow in the Cloud Minisode"	January 21, 2022	N/A
285.5	"Voyage of the Rock Aliens Minisode"	February 3, 2022	N/A
286.5	"Kate & Leopold Minisode"	February 17, 2022	N/A
287.5	"Killing me Softly Minisode"	March 3, 2022	N/A
288.5	"Last Looks: Dancin’: It’s On!"	March 17, 2022	N/A
289.5	"Last Looks: Shattered"	April 1, 2022	Includes a QuarChat segment featuring Rob Huebel
290.5	"Last Looks: Stone Cold"	April 15, 2022	N/A
291.5	"Last Looks: Diana: The Musical"	April 29, 2022	N/A
292.5	"Last Looks: A Sound of Thunder"	May 13, 2022	N/A
293.5	"Last Looks: Grand Piano"	May 27, 2022	N/A
294.5	"Last Looks: Moonfall"	June 17, 2022	N/A
295.5	"Last Looks: Until We Meet Again"	July 1, 2022	N/A
296.5	"Last Looks: Tuff Turf"	July 15, 2022	Jason Mantzoukas fills in for Paul Scheer
297.5	"Last Looks: The Legend of The Stardust Brothers"	July 29, 2022	N/A
298.5	"Last Looks: Music From Another Room"	August 12, 2022	N/A
299.5	"Last Looks: Love on a Leash"	August 26, 2022	Includes a deleted clip from Love on a Leash episode
300.5	"Last Looks: Hard Target"	September 9, 2022	N/A
301.5	"Last Looks: Open Windows"	September 23, 2022	N/A
302.5	"Last Looks: An American Werewolf in Paris"	October 7, 2022	N/A
303.5	"Last Looks: Wish Upon"	October 21, 2022	N/A
304.5	"Last Looks: Dracula 2000"	November 4, 2022	N/A
305.5	"Last Looks: Designed to Kill"	November 18, 2022	Comedian Natasha Leggero joins to chat with Paul and Jason
306.5	"Last Looks: The Oogieloves"	December 2, 2022	June Diane Raphael joins to chat with Paul
307.5	"Last Looks: 12 Pups of Christmas"	December 16, 2022	Includes a deleted clip from 12 Pups of Christmas episode
308.5/309.5	"Last Looks: Ghost in the Machine & Morbius"	January 13, 2023	Includes a deleted clip from Morbius episode; director Jason Woliner joins to chat with Paul and Jason
310.5	"Last Looks: Open Marriage"	January 27, 2023	Includes a deleted clip from Open Marriage episode
311.5	"Last Looks: Wild Mountain Thyme"	February 6, 2023	Adam Pally joins to chat with Paul and Jason; also clip from Felissa Rose
313.5	"Last Looks: The Number 23"	March 3, 2023	N/Ad
314.5	"Last Looks: Ski School"	March 17, 2023	Carl Tart and Phil Augusta Jackson join to chat with Paul and Jason
315.5	"Last Looks: Ambulance"	March 31, 2023	Includes a deleted clip from Ambulance episode
316.5	"Last Looks: The Specialist"	April 14, 2023	Includes a deleted clip from The Specialist episode
317.5	"Last Looks: View from the Top"	April 28, 2023	Travel episode
318.5	"Last Looks: Torque"	May 11, 2023	Includes a deleted clip from Torque episode
319.5	"Last Looks: The Fast and the Furious"	May 26, 2023	Includes a deleted clip from The Fast and the Furious episode
320.5	"Last Looks: Fast X"	June 8, 2023	Hosted by Jason; Woniya Thibault joins to chat with Paul and Jason; includes a deleted clip from Fast X episode
321.5	"Last Looks: Milk Money"	June 22, 2023	Includes a deleted clip from Milk Money episode
322.5/323.5	"Last Looks: Hypnotic & Sleepover"	July 20, 2023	Includes a deleted clip from Hypnotic episode
324.5	"Last Looks: Absolution"	August 3, 2023	Includes a deleted clip from Absolution episode
325.5	"Last Looks: Hangman"	August 17, 2023	Jason and Paul give a behind-the-scenes recap of the Balcony Monsters Tour
326.5	"Last Looks: Switch"	August 31, 2023	Includes a deleted clip from Switch episode
327.5	"Last Looks: The First Power"	September 14, 2023	Includes a deleted clip from The First Power episode
328.5	"Last Looks: Jonathan Livingston Seagull"	September 28, 2023	Includes a deleted clip from Jonathan Livingston Seagull episode
329.5	"Last Looks: Bats"	October 12, 2023	Includes a deleted clip from Bats episode
330.5	"Last Looks: The Pope’s Exorcist"	October 26, 2023	Includes a deleted clip from The Pope’s Exorcist episode
331.5	"Last Looks: New York Ninja"	November 9, 2023	Includes a deleted clip from New York Ninja episode
332.5/333.5	"Last Looks: Munchies & The Dog Who Saved Christmas"	December 7, 2023	Includes deleted clips from Munchies & The Dog Who Saved Christmas episodes
334.5	"Last Looks: A Beauty and the Beast Christmas"	December 21, 2023	Includes a deleted clip from A Beauty and the Beast Christmas episode
335.5/336.5	"Last Looks: D&D & The King's Daughter"	January 18, 2024	Ike Barinholtz joins to chat with Paul
337.5	"Last Looks: Last Looks: Rollerball"	February 1, 2024	Moshe Kasher joins to chat with Paul
338.5	"Last Looks: Fifty Shades of Grey"	February 15, 2024	Jason and Paul chat about Super Bowl trailers, comic books, television, and movies.
339.5	"Last Looks: Beautiful Disaster"	February 29, 2024	Jason joins Paul to chat about the death of Pitchfork.
340.5	"Last Looks: Fifty Shades Darker"	March 14, 2024	Jake Johnson joins June & Paul to chat about his new podcast.
341.5/342.5	"Fifty Shades Freed & Ronal the Barbarian"	April 11, 2024	Jason and Paul are back from the UK to gab all about the tour and more.
343.5	"Last Looks: Samurai Cop"	April 25, 2024	Todd Glass joins Jason & Paul to chat about TikTok and stand-up comedy.
344.5	"Last Looks: The Beekeeper"	May 9, 2024	Paul responds to viewer mail, & shares a bonus scene from The Beekeeper live show.
345.5	"Last Looks: The Ugly Truth [Jason Edition]"	May 23, 2024	Jason takes over the episode. (Includes a bonus clip from The Ugly Truth live show).
346.5	"Last Looks: Madame Web"	June 6, 2024	Paul shares a bonus scene from the Madame Web live show.
347.5	"Last Looks: Merlin: The Return"	June 20, 2024	Jason joins Paul to test their knowledge of movie wizards when they play “The Wiz Quiz”. Includes bonus scene from the Merlin live show.
348.5	"Last Looks: The Happening"	July 4, 2024	June and Paul chat about his love of scaring people, plus a bonus clip from The Happening live show.
349.5	"Last Looks: Shark Attack 3 Megalodon"	July 18, 2024	Writer/comedian Jordan Morris chats with Jason & Paul. features bonus content from Shark Attack 3 live show.
350.5	"Last Looks: Bait 3D"	August 1, 2024	Jason & Paul have a classic "Just Chat"
351.5	"Last Looks: Thunderpants"	August 15, 2024	Jake Brennan stops by to chat with Jason & Paul. Includes a bonus clip from Thunderpants live show.
352.5	"Last Looks: Beautiful Wedding"	August 29, 2024	Greg Fitzsimmons joins to talk with Jason & Paul. Featuring content from the Beautiful Wedding live show.
353.5	"Last Looks: Troll"	September 5, 2024	Jason joins Paul to chat about heist movies and much more! Plus a deleted scene form The Troll episode.
354.5	"Last Looks: Troll 2"	September 26, 2024	Jason and Paul recommend A TON of media. Includes an extra clip from The Troll 2 virtual live show.
355.5	"Last Looks: Communion [June Chat Edition]"	October 10, 2024	June makes a rare Last Looks appearance to chat with Paul about their fave board games and much more!
356.5	"Last Looks: Trap"	October 24, 2024	Jason and Paul answer your Halloween-themed questions and share bonus live clip from the Trap episode.
357.5	"Last Looks: Eye of the Beholder"	November 7, 2024	Mikhael Tara Garver joins Jason and Paul to discuss art and entertainment.
358.5	"Last Looks: Q The Winged Serpent"	November 21, 2024	Jason joins Paul for a marathon chat about what music & podcasts. Featuring a bonus clip from the Q live show.
359.5	"Last Looks: Dream A Little Dream"	December 5, 2024	Jason & Paul gab about all the TV shows, movies, and podcasts.
360.5	"Last Looks: Christmas Mail"	December 19, 2024	Jason & Paul talk about everything from teen slang, to new movies.
361.8	"Last Looks: Bad Boys: Ride or Die"	January 16, 2025	Paul answers questions about Bad Boys: Ride or Die, and chats with author Brad Meltzer.
362.5	"Last Looks: Megalopolis"	January 30, 2025	Paul answers all your questions about Megalopolis, chats with Jason about some TV, books, and comics.
363.5	"Last Looks: Passion Play"	February 13, 2025	Paul dives into all your Questions and Omissions from Passion Play, Jason joins to talk about his upcoming projects.
364.5	"Last Looks: The League of Extraordinary Gentlemen"	February 27, 2025	Jason joins Paul to go over listener Corrections, Omissions, and Apologies.
365.5	"Last Looks: Doppelganger"	March 13, 2025	Jason drops by to talk with Paul about Shorsey, SNL50, Lorne Michaels autobiography and more.
366.5	"Last Looks: Oops! All Just Chat"	March 27, 2025	This week’s Last Looks is all Just Chat with Jason, Paul, and special guest Ruby Karp.
367.5	"Last Looks: This Is Me… Now: A Love Story & Jill Rips"	April 10, 2025	Paul shares a bonus deleted scene from the Jill Rips live show.
368.5	"Last Looks: Kraven the Hunter [Jason Edition]"	April 24, 2025	Jason joins Paul to talk and share a bonus deleted scene from the Kraven live show.
369.5	"Last Looks: Double Trouble w/ Kristen Schaal & Tony Hale"	May 8, 2025	Kristen Schaal & Tony Hale pop by for a silly chat with Paul & Jason. Includes a bonus clip from the Double Trouble live show.
370.5	"Last Looks: The Arrival"	May 22, 2025	Paul answers the help line and discusses The Arrival.
371.5	"Last Looks: Sinbad Of The Seven Seas w/ Jon Gabrus"	June 5, 2025	Paul answers corrections and omissions and is joined by Jon Gabrus.
372.5	"Last Looks: You Got Served w/ Larry Charles"	June 19, 2025	Paul reviews questions from last week’s movie. Then Jason joins Paul to talk with comedy legend Larry Charles.
373.5	"Last Looks: Surf II"	July 3, 2025	Paul goes over everything that might have been missed from last week’s episode.
