= No More Victims =

American nonprofit organization

- Founded: 2002
- Founder: Marilyn Gambrell
- Type: 501(c)(3) organization
- Purpose: Children of incarcerated parents
- Location: Houston, Texas, U.S.
- Method: Peer support

No More Victims, founded in 2002, is a 501(c)(3) program that works with the children of incarcerated parents in Houston.

== History ==
The program was founded by former parole officer, Marilyn Gambrell, and addresses the physical, emotional, academic and social needs and issues of teens through a facilitated peer-support program. The first classes were taught at M. B. Smiley High School in Houston, Texas. In 2005, the story became a made-for-TV movie called Fighting the Odds: The Marilyn Gambrell Story starring Jami Gertz.

The program's motto is "Get educated, not incarcerated." The classes are based on the No More Victims Family concept, which involves creating a facilitated, trusting environment in which children can openly discuss their challenges and fears, and receive the support of their fellow students. Despite research indicating that children of incarcerated parents are only about half as likely to graduate from high school as children whose parents were not incarcerated, every senior in the No More Victims program typically graduates and most are accepted into college, technical training or military assignments.

== Target population ==
Parental incarceration has been called "the greatest threat to child well-being" in the United States because it creates the high potential that the child will be exposed to risk factors such as poverty, sexual and physical abuse, teen pregnancy and violence. According to a landmark study by the Anne E. Casey Foundation, more than 5.1 million children in the U.S. have a parent who is in prison or has been incarcerated at some point in the child's life. That includes 477,000 in Texas, where No More Victims is based.
