= Marilyn Gambrell =

American parole officer

Marilyn Gambrell is a parole-officer-turned-teacher who started the program No More Victims at the M.B. Smiley High School in Houston, Texas. The program was developed to assist children with incarcerated parents, hoping to prevent them from following in their parents' footsteps. Since the program's start in 1993, hundreds of children have graduated under her tenure.

Gambrell is also the author of a series of books entitled Cherish the Child Within, a curriculum used by educators, professionals, and social workers, and has recently completed a series of coloring books entitled My Feelings Are Real. She was played by Jami Gertz in the Lifetime movie Fighting the Odds: The Marilyn Gambrell Story.

== See also ==
- Fighting the Odds: The Marilyn Gambrell Story
- Inspirational/motivational instructors/mentors portrayed in films
