= Sicily Sewell =

American actress

- Born: October 1, 1985 (age 40); Pontiac, Michigan, US
- Other name: Sicily
- Occupations: Restaurateur, actress
- Years active: 1995–present
- Spouse: Chris Johnson (m. 2006)
- Children: 2

Sicily Sewell (born October 1, 1985) is an American chef, restaurateur, television producer, and actress. She is sometimes credited in film or television as simply with a mononym Sicily. Following the birth of two daughters, Sewell became a restaurateur.

== Early life, family and education ==
Sewell was born in Pontiac, Michigan. Her parents divorced, and she and her mother and brothers relocated to California where other family resided. She has three brothers (one of which was born after their relocation to California). She resided in Los Angeles during her childhood.

As an adult, Sewell attending the Hollywood campus of Le Cordon Bleu College of Culinary Arts.

== Career ==
=== Television and film ===
Sewell made her television appearance on an Emmy Award-winning episode of Sesame Street when she was eight years old. She played "Young Aisha" in a two-part episode of Season 2 of Mighty Morphin Power Rangers called "Rangers Back in Time", as well as in the 10 part miniseries Mighty Morphin Alien Rangers. She starred as young Diana in the hit miniseries, Mama Flora's Family in 1998, and as Angela Bassett's niece in the film How Stella Got Her Groove Back.

For 4 seasons, Sewell portrayed Spirit Jones, the best friend of Breanna Barnes (played by Kyla Pratt) in the sitcom One on One. Citing a decision by UPN to move in a different direction for the fifth season, Sicily was released from the series on June 20, 2005, when it was nine episodes away from syndication.

Sewell also appeared in the Lifetime original movie Fighting the Odds: The Marilyn Gambrell Story alongside Ernie Hudson, Edwin Hodge and Jami Gertz in August 2005.

=== Chef and restaurateur ===
Sewell's family has a long tradition of cookery. She has told interviewers she is much happier as a chef and restaurateur than she was an actor.

In 2010, while Sewell was attending the Hollywood campus of Le Cordon Bleu College of Culinary Arts, she was an intern at the Los Angeles Times' Test Kitchen. Sewell subsequently graduated, with honours.

Sewell and her mother are co-owners of a soul food restaurant known as Pinky and Red's, in Berkeley, California. In late 2019, Sewell was hired as the chef of a high-profile restaurant known as Colors, in New York City.

== Personal life ==
Sewell came out as gay in a 2022 interview with Comedy Hype channel. She revealed that, despite still being in the closet to her One On One castmates, she was open about her attraction to women at a young age to her close friends.

== Filmography ==
Film
Year	Film	Role	Notes
1998	Children of the Corn V: Fields of Terror	Chloe	
1998	How Stella Got Her Groove Back	Chantel	
Television
Year	Title	Role	Notes
1995–1996	Mighty Morphin Power Rangers	Young Aisha Campbell	13 episodes
1998	Mama Flora's Family	Teenage Diana	Television Movie
1999	Power Rangers: The Lost Episode	Young Aisha Campbell	Special episode (archival footage)
2001–2005	One on One	Spirit Jones	91 episodes
2004	The Proud Family	Teen Cece	1 episode
2005	Fighting the Odds: The Marilyn Gambrell Story	Lisa Jones	Television Movie
2007	Super Sweet 16: The Movie	Chloe Spears	Television Movie
