= This Can't Be Love =

This Can't Be Love may refer to:

- "This Can't Be Love" (song), a 1938 song by Rodgers and Hart, introduced in the musical play, The Boys from Syracuse
- This Can't Be Love (film), a 1994 television film
