= Malik Boyd =

American football player and executive (born 1970)

Buffalo Bills
- Title: Senior personnel advisor

Personal information
- Born: November 5, 1970 (age 56); Houston, Texas, U.S.
- Listed height: 5 ft 10 in (1.78 m)
- Listed weight: 175 lb (79 kg)

Career information
- Position: Defensive back (No. 36)
- High school: M. B. Smiley (TX)
- College: Southern
- NFL draft: 1994: undrafted

Career history

Playing
- Minnesota Vikings (1994); New Orleans Saints (1996)*
- * Offseason or practice squad member only

Operations
- Indianapolis Colts (2003–2005) Scouting assistant; Arizona Cardinals (2005-2008) Midwest area scout; Arizona Cardinals (2008-2014) Western regional scout; Arizona Cardinals (2014-2017) Assistant director of pro scouting; Buffalo Bills (2017–2022) Senior director of pro personnel; Buffalo Bills (2023-present) Senior personnel advisor

Career NFL statistics
- Tackles: 35
- Interceptions: 1
- Stats at Pro Football Reference

Malik Boyd (born November 5, 1970) is an American professional football executive. Boyd is the senior director of pro personnel for the Buffalo Bills in the National Football League (NFL). In 2014, Boyd received the Fritz Pollard Alliance NFC Scout of the Year Award as the Western Regional College Scout for the Arizona Cardinals. Boyd played for the Minnesota Vikings as a defensive back in 1994 and 1995.

== Career ==
Prior to joining the Bills, Boyd held several roles with the Indianapolis Colts and Arizona Cardinals affording elevated responsibility and experience in college scouting and pro personnel departments.

Indianapolis Colts

Boyd's first exposure to NFL football operations and scouting began with the Indianapolis Colts in 2003 with Bill Polian as general manager and Tony Dungy as head coach. Boyd was hired on as a scouting assistant and remained with the Colts for two years.

Arizona Cardinals

In 2005, Boyd transitioned to the Arizona Cardinals as the Midwest area scout with GM, Rod Graves. In 2008, Boyd was promoted to the role of Western regional scout, assessing and evaluating top college players west of Mississippi including players in Wisconsin, Michigan, Tennessee, and Alabama. It was in the 2008 season that the Arizona Cardinals became NFC Champions and made an appearance in Super Bowl XLIII. In 2014, Boyd was promoted by GM, Steve Keim, to the role of assistant director of pro scouting and was in the role for three years prior to the next elevation to the director's role in Buffalo, NY.

Buffalo Bills

In 2017, Boyd was the first executive targeted by Brandon Beane for the director of pro personnel role at the Buffalo Bills. He was hired on and is currently the director of pro personnel for the Bills since May 2017.

== Personal life ==
Boyd played in the National Football League as a defensive back for the Minnesota Vikings in the 1994 and 1995 seasons. Prior to the NFL, from 1990 to 1993, he played as a defensive back on the Southern University (Baton Rouge) football team. It was during this time that the Southern University Jaguars won the 1993 SWAC and Black College Football National Championships. Boyd graduated from Southern University (Baton Rouge) with a Bachelor of Science (B.S.) in Rehabilitation Psychology degree.
