= Lost Holiday (2007 film) =

2007 television film

Lost Holiday: The Jim And Suzanne Shemwell Story is a 2007 Lifetime Television movie starring Jami Gertz and Dylan Walsh. It was based on a true story.

== Plot ==
In Idaho, an estranged couple are trapped in a blizzard while on vacation just before Christmas. The couple goes snowmobiling in the mountains, but this excursion turns into a life-threatening situation. They confront the reason for their separation as they fight to stay alive.

== Cast ==
- Dylan Walsh – Jimmy Shemwell
- Jami Gertz – Suzanne Shemwell
- Aaron Pearl – Blake Thompson
- Julia Maxwell – Miranda Shemwell
- Alex Arsenault – Keith
- Judith Buchan – Mary Ann Ford
- David Haysom – MP
- Rainer Kahl – MP
- Jacey Kenny – Kate
- Barb Mitchell – Deborah Markle
- Brooklynn Proulx – Taryn Shemwell
- Joe Norman Shaw – Shérif Tierney
