= Keith Baldwin =

American football player (born 1960)

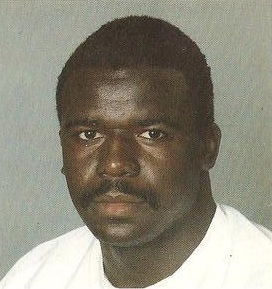

No. 99, 96
- Position: Defensive end

Personal information
- Born: October 13, 1960 (age 66); Houston, Texas, U.S.
- Listed height: 6 ft 5 in (1.96 m)
- Listed weight: 263 lb (119 kg)

Career information
- High school: M. B. Smiley (Houston)
- College: Texas A&M
- NFL draft: 1982: 2nd round, 31st overall pick

Career history
- Cleveland Browns (1982–1986); San Diego Chargers (1987–1988); Los Angeles Raiders (1988)

Career NFL statistics
- Sacks: 7.5
- Stats at Pro Football Reference

Keith Manning Baldwin (born October 13, 1960) is an American former professional football player who was a defensive end for six seasons in the National Football League (NFL) with the Cleveland Browns and San Diego Chargers. He was selected by the Browns in the second round of the 1982 NFL draft after playing college football for the Texas A&M Aggies

== Early life and college ==
Keith Manning Baldwin was born on October 13, 1960, in Houston, Texas. He attended M. B. Smiley High School in Houston.

He played college football for the Texas A&M Aggies.

== Professional career ==
Baldwin was selected by the Cleveland Browns in the 2nd round, with the 31st overall pick, of the 1982 NFL draft. He played in nine games, starting one, for the Browns during his rookie year in 1982 and posted one sack. He also appeared in one playoff game that season. Baldwin appeared in all 16 games, starting nine, during the 1983 season and recorded one sack for the second straight year. He started all 16 games for Cleveland in 1984 and made 4.5 sacks. The Browns finished the season with a 5–11 record. Baldwin played in ten games in 1985, posting one sack. He also appeared in a postseason game that year. On August 9, 1986, he suffered a season-ending knee injury in a preseason game against the Buffalo Bills. He became a free agent after the 1986 season. Baldwin re-signed with the Browns, but was later released on June 25, 1987.

Baldwin then signed with the San Diego Chargers. He spent most of the 1987 season on injured reserve with a knee injury but was activated in November. He then played in six games, starting one, that year. Baldwin appeared in six games, starting one, for the second consecutive season in 1988. He was released in mid October 1988.

Baldwin signed with the Los Angeles Raiders on November 10, 1988. He was released by the Raiders on November 30, 1988, before appearing in a game.
