= Colors (restaurant) =

Defunct restaurant in New York City, U.S.

- Interactive map of Colors

Restaurant information
- Location: 178 Stanton Street, New York City, New York, 10002, United States
- Coordinates: 40.72021°N 73.98397°W

Colors was a 70-seat restaurant on the Lower East Side of Manhattan, New York City. The September 11 attacks on the World Trade Center destroyed the popular Windows on the World restaurant, and, when many of its former workers remained unemployed a non-profit started the restaurant to employ them, while upgrading their skills.

Former employees of the Windows on the World restaurant opened Colors in 2006, with the support of the non-profit Restaurant Opportunities Center. The restaurant closed its original location in 2017. The New York Times, and other publications, reported that ROC had problems fulfilling its ideals of worker empowerment, reporting difficulties like workers quitting over not being paid on time.

Former actress Sicily Sewell, who trained at Le Cordon Bleu, was hired as chef to oversee the kitchen in a re-opened Colors in the fall of 2019. When the newly reopened restaurant was shut down one month later, Sewell was critical of management, who had failed to inform employees that they saw the reopening as a "test run".
