= Love on a Leash =

- Directed by: Fen Tian
- Written by: Fen Tian
- Produced by: Fen Tian
- Starring: Jana Camp; Aneese Khamo; Stephen Kramer Glickman
- Cinematography: Keith Holland
- Edited by: Toby J. Brown
- Music by: Peter Davison (Note: The version of the film most widely seen contains no score. However, Davison composed music for the film, and some speculate the score was removed over a financial dispute between Davison and the filmmakers.)
- Release date: 2011
- Running time: 85 minutes
- Country: United States
- Language: English

Love on a Leash is a 2011 romantic comedy film directed by Fen Tian which stars Jana Camp and Stephen Kramer Glickman. This "notorious" film has become known for its unusual creative choices and is frequently included on lists of especially bad or bizarre movies.

== Synopsis ==
Lisa is a young woman who has not been lucky finding a romantic partner. She meets a golden retriever whom she names Prince (who also calls himself Alvin Flang). After discovering that Prince turns into a human man each night, Lisa falls in love with him.

== Cast ==
- Jana Camp as Lisa
- Aneese Khamo as Prince (human form)
- Stephen Kramer Glickman as Prince/Alvin Flang (voice)
- Michaelina Lee as Rita
- Gloria Winship Ayon as Mother
- Femi Emiola as Paula
- Ping Wu as Kyle
- Robert Lanza as Frank

== Cult status ==
Since release, Love on a Leash has earned notoriety as a cult film. It has since been covered on movie podcasts such as How Did This Get Made? and The Flop House. The film website Collider listed Love on a Leash as one of the best "so bad, they're good" films of the 2010s. In a 2026 retrospective, IndieWire called it "baffling", "weird", and "unpleasant."

== See also ==
- List of films considered the worst
