= Stephen Kramer Glickman =

Canadian actor and singer (born 1979)

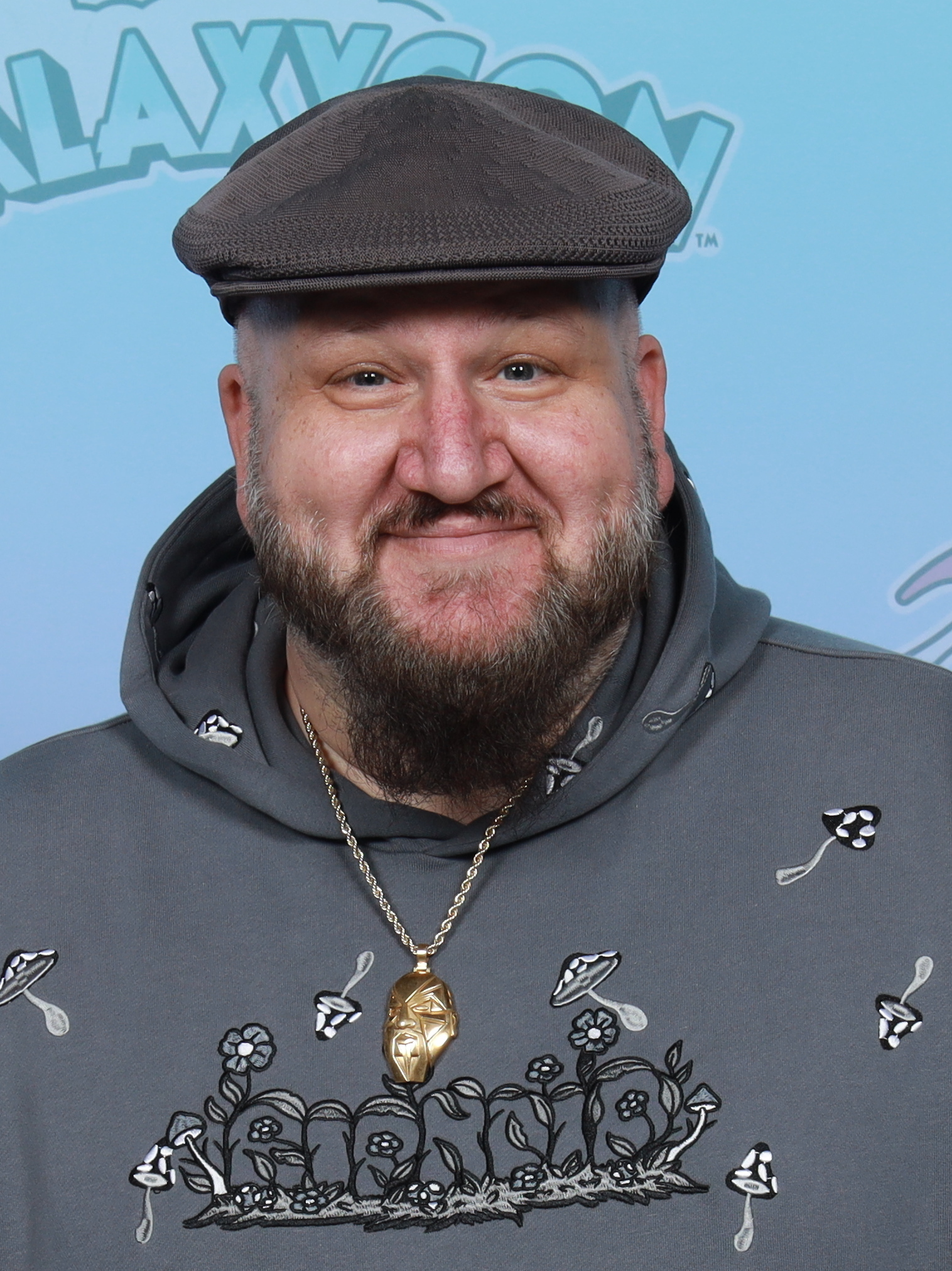
- Glickman at GalaxyCon Columbus in 2024
- Born: March 17, 1979 (age 47); London, Ontario, Canada
- Education: American Musical and Dramatic Academy
- Occupations: Actor; comedian; singer
- Years active: 2003–present

Stephen Kramer Glickman (born March 17, 1979) is a Canadian actor, comedian and singer. He is best known for his role as Gustavo Rocque on the Nickelodeon sitcom Big Time Rush (2009–2013), and for co-hosting the podcast The Night Time Show.

== Biography ==
Stephen Kramer Glickman was born to a Jewish family of Russian descent in London, Ontario, Canada. His family moved to Carlsbad, California, where he became involved in doing community theatre. Growing up, Glickman experienced antisemitism to the point where he dropped out of the 8th grade, having been assaulted. He later attended the American Academy of Dramatic Arts, and graduated from the American Musical and Dramatic Academy.

In 2007, Glickman was cast as Shrek in Shrek the Musical, and played the part in the original Broadway workshops and readings, before Brian d'Arcy James was cast in 2008. In 2009, Glickman starred as record producer Gustavo Rocque on the Nickelodeon television series, Big Time Rush. He has also voiced Billy Bob in an animated web series named Trailer Trash produced by Stupid Factory Studios and Titmouse and distributed by Mondo Media and Lionsgate. In 2025, it was announced that Glickman would be reuniting with his original Big Time Rush castmates for a new concert tour titled the "In Real Life Worldwide Tour" as a supporting act.

== Personal life ==
On the one month anniversary of the October 7 attacks, Glickman posted about his childhood experience with antisemitism, and stated "in Synogouge [sic] we are taught that being Jewish is more than a religion, it’s a people and that our homeland since the time of the Torah (6th century BC) is the land of Israel."

== Filmography ==
=== Film ===
| Year | Title | Role | Notes |
|---|---|---|---|
| 2010 | The 41-Year-Old Virgin Who Knocked Up Sarah Marshall and Felt Superbad About It | Seth | Also associate producer |
| 2010 | Love on a Leash | Prince a.k.a. "Alvin Flang" (voice) | Uncredited |
| 2013 | 30 Nights of Paranormal Activity with the Devil Inside the Girl with the Dragon Tattoo | Detective Sheldon Burnett | Also creative consultant & associate producer |
| 2014 | Kira | Doctor | Short film |
| 2014 | The Hall Monitors | Principal Schwartzman | Short film |
| 2016 | Storks | Pigeon Toady (voice) | |
| 2016 | Pigeon Toady's Guide to Your New Baby | Pigeon Toady (voice) | Short film |
| 2017 | Car Botz | The Narrator | Short film |
| 2017 | Best of Luck | Pug Dad (voice) | Short film |
| 2017 | Beware the Lake | Sheriff Grimes | |
| 2018 | On the Corner of Ego and Desire | Stephen | |
| 2018 | White Fang | Ned (voice) | |
| 2021 | Tales of a Fifth Grade Robin Hood | Wolfe | |

=== Television ===
| Year | Title | Role | Notes |
|---|---|---|---|
| 2007–2008 | Carpoolers | Rust Bucket Boy | 2 episodes |
| 2008 | Jeffrey Ross: No Offense- Live from New Jersey | Larry | Comedy special |
| 2009–2013 | Big Time Rush | Gustavo Rocque | Main cast |
| 2012 | Small Business | Gary Middlewater | Television film |
| 2012 | Big Time Movie | Gustavo Rocque | Television film |
| 2012 | Figure It Out | Himself | 3 episodes |
| 2012 | Cupcake Wars | Himself (celebrity judge) | 2 episodes |
| 2013 | The Ricki Lake Show | Himself (guest) | Episode: "Let's Get Physical" |
| 2014 | Workaholics | Trevor | Episode: "Friendship Anniversary" |
| 2016–2018 | Home & Family | Himself (guest) | 2 episodes |
| 2017 | Stuck in the Middle | Benny Burtz | Episode: "Stuck at Christmas" |
| 2022 | The Really Loud House | Milkshake Marty | Episode: "The Chore Thing" |
| 2024–2025 | Hamster & Gretel | Mud Singer, additional voices | 3 episodes |

=== Web ===
| Year | Title | Role | Notes |
|---|---|---|---|
| 2011 | Trailer Trash | Billy Bob (voice) | |
| 2013 | Police Guys | Stephen | Also executive producer |
| 2013 | Super Power Beat Down | Host | 1 episode |
| 2015 | The Mysteries of Science | Saul Jung Un | Episode: "Canceled" |
| 2015 | Tom Green's House Tonight | Himself (guest host) | 2 episodes |
| 2015–present | The Night Time Show | Himself (host) | Also creator, director, and producer |
| 2015 | The Mysteries of Science | Chum Powers | 1 episode |
| 2016 | Storks: Guide to Your New Baby | Pigeon Toady | Voice role |
| 2018 | Weather Gone Viral | Comedian | |
| 2018 | Oishi: Demon Hunter | Julius | 3 episodes |
| 2021 | Monster Hunter: Legends of the Guild | Nox | Voice role |
