= William Harris (American football) =

American football player (1965–2014)

No. 89, 86
- Position: Tight end

Personal information
- Born: February 10, 1965; Houston, Texas, U.S.
- Died: February 4, 2014 (aged 48)
- Listed height: 6 ft 4 in (1.93 m)
- Listed weight: 239 lb (108 kg)

Career information
- High school: M. B. Smiley (Houston)
- College: Texas; Bishop
- NFL draft: 1987: 7th round, 195th overall pick

Career history
- St. Louis Cardinals (1987); San Francisco 49ers (1989); Tampa Bay Buccaneers (1989); Green Bay Packers (1990)

Awards and highlights
- Second-team All-American (1985)

Career NFL statistics
- Receptions: 12
- Receiving yards: 110
- Touchdowns: 1
- Stats at Pro Football Reference

William Milton Harris (February 10, 1965 – February 4, 2014) was an American professional football player who was a tight end in the National Football League (NFL). He played college football for the Texas Longhorns and Bishop Tigers.

== Early life and college ==
Harris was born and raised in Houston, Texas and attended M. B. Smiley High School. He played at the collegiate level at Bishop College and the University of Texas at Austin. Harris was a second-team All-America selection as a junior.

== Professional career ==
Pre-draft measurables
Height	Weight	Arm length	Hand span	40-yard dash	10-yard split	20-yard split	20-yard shuttle	Vertical jump	Broad jump	Bench press
6 ft 4 1/4 in (1.94 m)	244 lb (111 kg)	33 in (0.84 m)	10 in (0.25 m)	4.71 s	1.62 s	2.72 s	4.43 s	28.0 in (0.71 m)	8 ft 11 in (2.72 m)	10 reps
All values from NFL Combine

Harris was selected by the St. Louis Cardinals in the seventh round of the 1987 NFL draft (195th overall) and spent that season with the team. After a year away from the NFL, Harris spent the 1989 NFL season with the Tampa Bay Buccaneers and the 1990 NFL season with the Green Bay Packers.

== Death ==
Harris died in Houston on February 4, 2014 after a long bout with Lou Gehrig's disease. He was interred at Resthaven Cemetery in Houston.
