= M. B. Smiley High School =

Former school in Texas, United States

Coordinates: 29°52′10″N 95°15′48″W

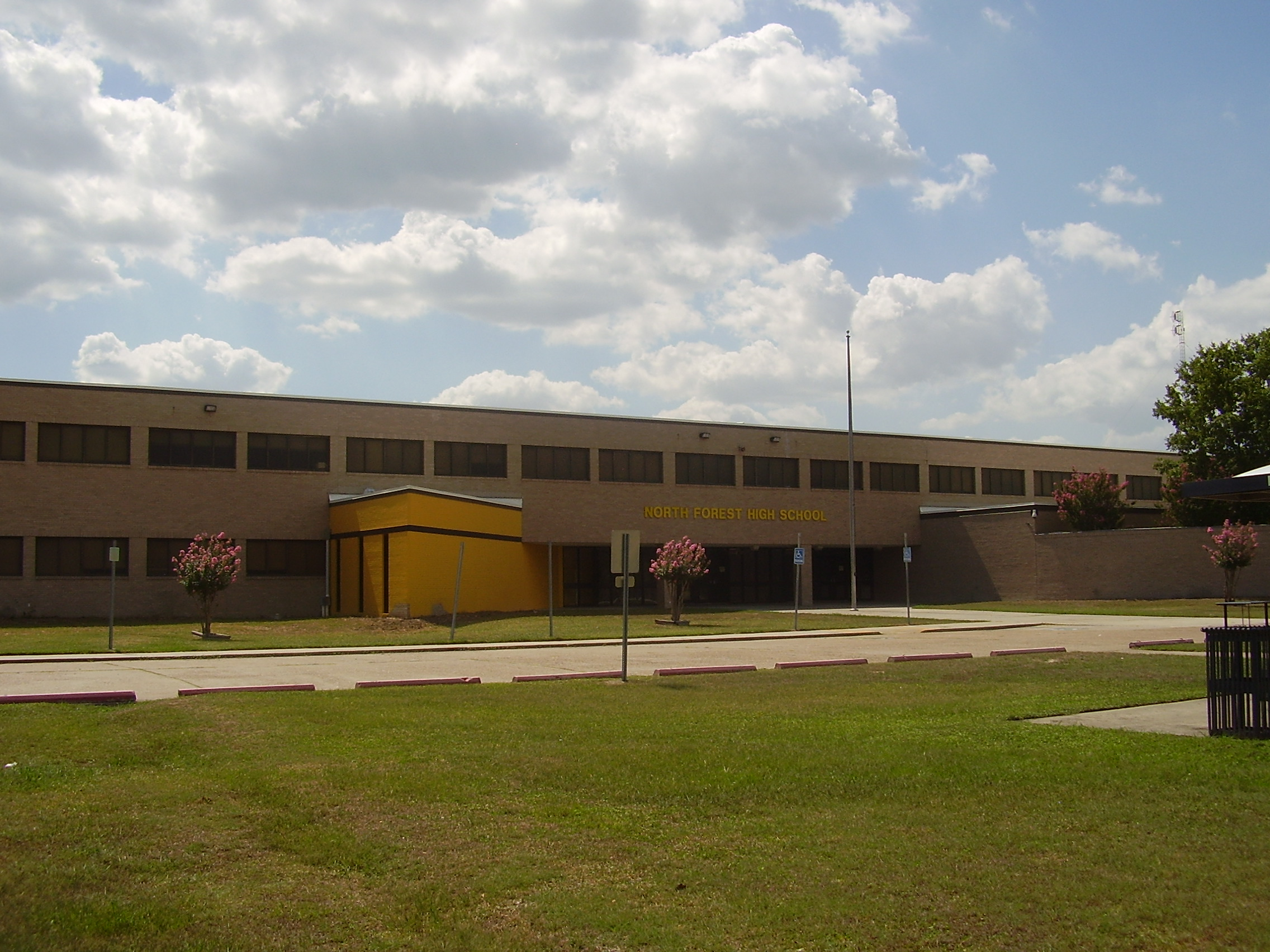
The former Smiley High School, converted into North Forest High School at the time, now the Houston Independent School District Education Learning Center

M.B. Smiley High School was a public secondary school in Houston, Texas, United States. Smiley, which served grades 9 through 12, and was a part of the North Forest Independent School District. M.B. Smiley was featured in the film Fighting the Odds: The Marilyn Gambrell Story, which aired on Lifetime. The campus later was used as the main campus for North Forest High School. As of 2022 it is used as the Houston Independent School District Education Learning Center.

Marilyn Gambrell, a parole officer who became a teacher, started a program called "No More Victims", which was designed to prevent children of incarcerated individuals from going to prison.

The library, the Carole M. Anderson Library, was named after Carole Mae Anderson, a Smiley English teacher who donated books to the school's previous library facility.

== History ==
The original Smiley facility was built in 1953.

In July 1980, the school's main building was burned to the ground, due to arson. A series of portable buildings was brought in, and the completed new building opened in 1984.

In June 2001 Tropical Storm Allison damaged Forest Brook High School and NFISD officials temporarily closed the school. District officials wanted to put the children on the Smiley campus. NFISD residents protested the plan. Some argued that because Forest Brook and Smiley were rivals, putting the students on the same campus would lead to incidents. On July 19, 2001, district officials announced that they would move Forest Brook students to B. C. Elmore Middle School until Forest Brook was repaired.

During the 2001–2002 school year, Smiley had 1,631 students. It had a capacity of 3,125 students. This gave the school a 52% classroom usage rate.

On July 20, 2007, some teenagers vandalized Forest Brook High with a water hose. After the vandalism of Forest Brook High School, North Forest ISD decided to merge Forest Brook's population into Smiley until Forest Brook was repaired. Some parents and observers criticized the decision, fearing territorial rivalries would cause tension between Forest Brook and Smiley students. School officials states that the repair would take at least four months. Forest Brook re-opened in the spring.

In 2007 Johns Hopkins University referred to Smiley as a "dropout factory" where at least 40 percent of the entering freshman class did not make it to their senior year.

In March 2008 North Forest ISD announced that it would consolidate its two high schools. The new school, initially located in the Forest Brook building, was named North Forest High School. However, after Hurricane Ike North Forest High moved to the Smiley location. North Forest High used the Smiley building until 2018, when the Houston Independent School District (which absorbed North Forest ISD) opened a new North Forest High across Mesa Drive and converted the former Smiley building into the Education Learning Center, a professional development facility.

== Notable alumni ==
- Keith Baldwin – former NFL defensive end, Cleveland Browns and other teams
- Malik Boyd – NFL, executive Buffalo Bills; former NFL player, Minnesota Vikings
- William Harris – former NFL tight end, St. Louis Cardinals and other teams
- Augustine Rubit (born 1989) - basketball player in the Israeli Basketball Premier League
- Jonathon Simmons – professional basketball player
