= Monster Hunter: Legends of the Guild =

2021 computer animated film by Steve Yamamoto

- Promotional poster
- Directed by: Steve Yamamoto
- Written by: Joshua Fine
- Based on: Monster Hunter by Capcom
- Produced by: David Coleman
- Starring: Dante Basco; Erica Lindbeck; Brando Eaton; Karen Strassman; Stephen Kramer Glickman; Brian Beacock; Katie Leigh; G. K. Bowes; Jay Preston; Ben Rausch; Caroline Caliston; Dan McCoy
- Edited by: Alex Verlage
- Music by: David Wurst; Eric Wurst
- Production company: Pure Imagination Studios
- Distributed by: Netflix
- Release date: August 12, 2021
- Running time: 58 minutes
- Country: United States
- Language: English

Monster Hunter: Legends of the Guild is an American CG animated fantasy film by Steve Yamamoto in his directorial debut. It is based on the Japanese video game franchise Monster Hunter by Capcom. The film premiered on August 12, 2021, on Netflix.

== Plot ==
Before Monster Hunter: World, as the Fifth Fleet makes its way across the Great Sea to the New World, a group of young hunters aboard the flagship begin to brag about the upcoming battle against the Elder Dragon, Zorah Magdaros, only to be silenced by Aiden, a veteran hunter. Hoping to humble the youngsters, Aiden recounts his first encounter with an Elder Dragon.

Ten years ago, Aiden was a teenager living in a small mountain village. Since the village is so small and remote, the people cannot afford the time or money required to go to the nearest Guild-house whenever some minor monster causes problems. Aiden had taken it upon himself to hunt down these monsters for his neighbors. He is sent into the wild to find the monster that stole some livestock from the village, only to be almost eaten by a Velociraptor-like monster. Aiden is rescued by Julius, a Hunter from the guild, and learns from him that the monster that took the livestock, an anthropomorphic, catlike creature called a Melynx, was the true culprit and the tracks Aiden was following were fake. Aiden finds the hideout of the Melynx, named Nox. Aiden captures Nox and brings him to the village to show Julius. He soon learns from the Wyverian leader that an Elder Dragon, a monster that can devastate the environment and leave mass destruction in its wake, is on its migration path to the New World, which will bring it through Aiden's village.

Julius agrees to bring Aiden to see the Elder Dragon to confirm the upcoming attack so that the villagers will agree to evacuate. Aiden, Julius, and Nox reach the site where the Elder Dragon was sighted. The Elder Dragon is revealed to be a Lunastra, a Manticore-like Elder Dragon that can cause explosions. Aiden decides to have the whole village fight off the Lunastra instead of fleeing from it. Though it's against his protocol, Julius decides to stay with the village and fight off the Lunastra as well, shooting a signal flare to call other Hunters.

Later, the trio meet up with two Hunters named Mae, the owner of a journal Nox stole, and Nadia, an old partner of Julius. They agree to help with the fight against the Lunastra. Information from a trapped villager leads them to the blacksmith Ravi, a retired Hunter who does not take kindly to strangers. He refuses to help the party, saying that there is no light at the end of the tunnel if they fight the Elder Dragon.

They return to Aiden's village, letting everyone in on the plan to drive off the Lunastra. During the preparations, the team attempts to hunt a Congalala, a primate-like monster, but are interrupted by a Deviljho, a savage Tyrannosaurid-like monster. They manage to defeat both monsters, but Julius scolds Aiden for his reckless arrogance in failing to secure their trap for the Deviljho. Later, in the village, Nadia tells Julius to go easy on Aiden because just like him, Julius made mistakes when trying to impress his master in the past. Ravi meets up with the team, revealing he has changed his mind and decided to help fight the Elder Dragon. Ravi, with the help of many other smiths, craft a super weapon using parts from the Congalala and Deviljho. Once the preparations are complete, the villagers feast and await the siege. During the fight, Ravi and Mae are killed by the Lunastra, but Aiden has an idea to burst the village dam to flood the village while the rest of the team distract the Elder Dragon. The flood produced by the broken dam puts out the fire and repels the Lunastra from the village.

After dealing with Lunastra, Mae and Ravi are mourned. Aiden then decides to join Julius and Nadia as an "Ace Cadet" to the distant town of Dundorma to become one of the Guild Hunters. The film ends to the present day and sets up towards World.

== Voice cast ==
- Dante Basco as Aiden
- Erica Lindbeck as Lea
- Brando Eaton as Julius
- Karen Strassman as Genovan/Ebbi
- Stephen Kramer Glickman as Nox
- Brian Beacock as Navid
- Katie Leigh as Elder Daazeel
- G. K. Bowes as Nadia
- Jay Preston as Mitul
- Ben Rausch as Gibson
- Caroline Caliston as Mae
- Dan McCoy as Ravi

== Production ==
The film was first announced back in July 2018 as a "special" with its original video game developer/publisher Capcom, in joint collaboration with American company Pure Imagination Studios, handling its production. The existence of the special had been leaked days prior through a Do Not Work notice issued by SAG-AFTRA. It was originally set for a release window in 2019. Joshua Fine serves as scriptwriter.

== Release ==
The film was released on August 12, 2021, on Netflix.
