= Fighting the Odds: The Marilyn Gambrell Story =

- Genre: Biographical drama
- Written by: Andy Wolk; Peter Wolk
- Directed by: Andy Wolk
- Starring: Jami Gertz; Ernie Hudson; Eugene Clark; Sicily Sewell; Stacy Meadows Jr.; Trent Cameron; Edwin Hodge; Zak Santiago; Regine Nehy; Jorge Vargas
- Music by: Bruce Leitl
- Country of origin: United States
- Original language: English

Production
- Executive producers: Craig Baumgarten; Stanley Brooks
- Producers: Michael Frislev; Damian Ganczewski; Chad Oakes
- Cinematography: John Berrie
- Editor: Drake Silliman
- Running time: 120 minutes
- Production companies: Nomadic Pictures; Once Upon a Time Films

Original release
- Network: Lifetime
- Release: August 22, 2005

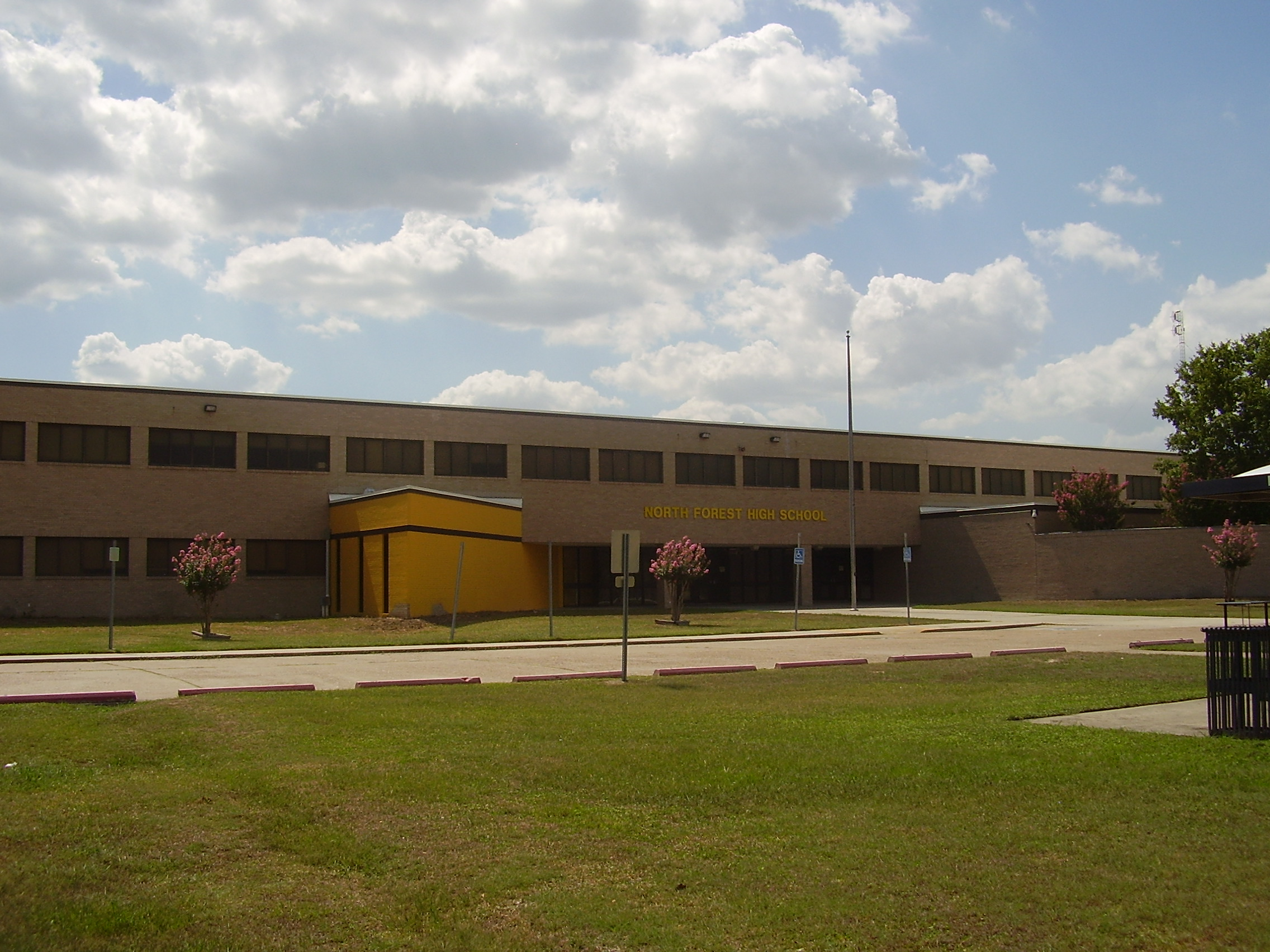
The former campus of M. B. Smiley High School, the school featured in the film - the campus is now the main campus of North Forest High School

Fighting the Odds: The Marilyn Gambrell Story is a 2005 American biographical drama television film which tells the true story of a former parole officer named Marilyn Gambrell, who helped a group of students at M. B. Smiley High School in Houston, Texas. The students had either been raped, sexually harassed and/or beaten by their own parents. Marilyn helped the students learn to fight back for one another and for themselves. For this, she created the No More Victims program.

The film aired on Lifetime. It stars Jami Gertz, Ernie Hudson, Eugene Clark and Sicily Sewell.
