= How Did This Get Made? =

American comedy podcast

- Genre: Comedy
- Language: English

Cast and voices
- Hosted by: Paul Scheer; June Diane Raphael; Jason Mantzoukas

Music
- Theme music composed by: Warren Fitzgerald

Production
- Length: 1–2 hours

Technical specifications
- Audio format: MP3

Publication
- No. of episodes: 404 (plus 373 minisodes, 6 bonus episodes, and 3 Origins episodes)
- Original release: December 10, 2010
- Provider: Earwolf
- Updates: Weekly (Mini/Regular episode)

Related
- Website: hdtgm.com

How Did This Get Made? (HDTGM) is a podcast on the Earwolf network. It is hosted by Paul Scheer, June Diane Raphael and Jason Mantzoukas with occasional substitutes and/or guest hosts. Each episode features the deconstruction and mockery of outlandish films that are widely considered to be the worst.

== Format ==
The hosts and guest make jokes about the films as well as attempt to unscramble plots. After discussing the film, Scheer reads "second opinions" in the form of five-star reviews posted online by Amazon.com users. The hosts also often make recommendations on if the film is worth watching. The show is released every two weeks.

Regular episodes reviewing films are released every other Friday, with ".5" episodes, or "minisodes," uploaded on the Fridays in between. These episodes feature Scheer answering fan questions, announcing the next movie, reading corrections, and opening fan mail. He also shares recommendations on books, movies, and TV shows. During the pandemic, Mantzoukas joined for "quar-chat," extending the minisodes to an hour. After the pandemic, these episodes evolved into "Last Looks," focusing on more in-depth discussions. "Last Looks" is a Hollywood term used on set just before filming begins, reflecting the shift to more involved content.

Some full episodes are recorded in front of a live audience and include a question and answer session and original "second opinion" theme songs sung by fans. Not all content from the live shows is included in the final released episode – about 30 minutes of each live show is edited out.

== History ==
The podcast started in 2010 and by 2019 had released over 200 episodes. How Did This Get Made? began after Scheer and Raphael saw the movie Wall Street: Money Never Sleeps. Later, the pair talked to Mantzoukas about the movie and joked about the idea for starting a bad movie podcast. As of August 2023, Wall Street: Money Never Sleeps has never been covered on the podcast.

== Awards ==
In 2019, How Did This Get Made? won a Webby Award in the category of Podcasts – Television & Film.

In 2020 and 2022, How Did This Get Made? won an iHeartRadio award in the category of Best TV & Film Podcast.

In 2022, How Did This Get Made? won an Ambie award in the category of Best Comedy Podcast.

== Spinoffs ==
=== How Did This Get Made?: Origin Stories ===
Between February and September 2017, a 17-episode spin-off series of the podcast was released. Entitled How Did This Get Made?: Origin Stories, author Blake J. Harris would interview people involved with the movies discussed on the podcast. Guests on the show included director Mel Brooks, who served as executive producer on Solarbabies, and screenwriter Dan Gordon, who wrote Surf Ninjas.

=== Unspooled ===
In May 2018, Scheer began a new podcast with Amy Nicholson titled Unspooled that is also devoted to movies. Unlike HDTGM?, Unspooled looks at films deemed good enough for the updated 2007 edition of the AFI Top 100. This is often referenced in How Did This Get Made? by Mantzoukas and Raphael, who are comically annoyed at how they were not invited to host the podcast, instead being subjected to the bad films that HDTGM covers.

=== How Did This Get Played? ===
In June 2019, the Earwolf network launched the podcast How Did This Get Played?, hosted by Doughboys host Nick Wiger and former Saturday Night Live writer Heather Anne Campbell. The podcast was positioned as the video game equivalent of HDTGM?, where Wiger and Campbell review widely panned video games. The podcast was later changed to Get Played, focusing on multiple aspects of video games and deviating from the original format.

=== French adaptation ===
The program was adapted in France in 2014 under the title 2 heures de perdues ("2 hours wasted"), a podcast in which several friends meet to analyze bad films in the same style ― mainly focusing on American, French, and British films. The show then ends with a reading of comments found on AlloCiné, the biggest French-speaking cinema website, or from Amazon.

=== Danish adaptation ===
The program was adapted in Denmark in 2014 under the title Dårligdommerne ("The bad judges"), a podcast in which the hosts Jacob Hinchely, Troels Møller and Christopher “sideburns” Andersen meet to analyze bad films in the same style ― mainly focusing on Danish films.

== See also ==
- List of film and television podcasts
- The Disaster Artist
- The Flop House
