= Solarbabies =

1986 film by Alan Johnson

- Theatrical poster by John Alvin
- Directed by: Alan Johnson
- Written by: Walon Green; Douglas Anthony Metrov
- Produced by: Jack Frost Sanders; Irene Walzer
- Starring: Richard Jordan; Jami Gertz; Jason Patric; Lukas Haas; Charles Durning
- Cinematography: Peter MacDonald
- Edited by: Conrad Buff
- Music by: Maurice Jarre
- Production companies: Brooksfilms; Metro-Goldwyn-Mayer
- Distributed by: MGM Entertainment Co.
- Release date: November 26, 1986 (U.S.)
- Running time: 94 minutes
- Country: United States
- Language: English
- Budget: $23 million
- Box office: $1.5 million

Solarbabies (also known as Solarwarriors and Solarfighters) is a 1986 American science fiction film, made by Brooksfilms and released by Metro-Goldwyn-Mayer. It was the second and final film directed by Alan Johnson, who is better known for his work as a choreographer.

Solarbabies was released theatrically on November 26, 1986. It bombed theatrically but became a cult favorite on video/cable, with some reviewers noting its production values (like music and design) and the careers it launched for stars like Jami Gertz and Jason Patric.

== Plot ==
In a bleak post-apocalyptic future, most of Earth's water has been placed under containment by the Eco Protectorate, a paramilitary organization, who governs the planet's new order. Orphan children, mostly teenagers, live in orphanages created by the Protectorate, designed to indoctrinate new recruits into their service. The orphans play a rough sport which is a hybrid of lacrosse and roller-hockey. Playing is the only thing that unites them other than the futile attempts of the Protectorate to control them. These orphans are Jason, the group's leader, Terra, Tug, Rabbit, Metron and a young deaf boy named Daniel.

While hiding in a cave, Daniel finds a mysterious orb with special powers. The orb is an alien intelligence called Bodhi, who miraculously restores Daniel's hearing and has other powers, such as creating rain indoors. Another orphan, Darstar, takes the orb, hoping that he will be able to use it. He leaves the orphanage on roller skates and Daniel soon follows. The rest of the group chase after Daniel. The E-police learn of Bodhi while chasing the teens and catch Darstar with the sphere. The teens are eventually rescued by a band of older outlaws called the Eco Warriors. They have retired from fighting and are led by Terra's long-lost father, Greentree.

The teens leave the Eco Warriors and using their roller skating skills, break into the Protectorate's high security Water Storage Building. The teens discover the E-Police are trying to destroy Bodhi and they manage to recover the alien, but as soon as they do the sphere dematerializes and destroys the facility, releasing the water back to where it belongs as they rush out. As they all gather on a nearby hillside, Bodhi sparks the first thunderstorm the teens have ever seen and returns to space, but not without leaving a bit of himself behind in each of them.

Ultimately, in the closing credits, the orphans are seen swimming together in the newly-restored ocean, Darstar being fully accepted into the group and Jason and Terra sharing a kiss.

== Cast ==
- Richard Jordan as Grock
- Jami Gertz as Terra
- Jason Patric as Jason
- Lukas Haas as Daniel
- James LeGros as Metron
- Claude Brooks as Rabbit
- Peter DeLuise as Tug
- Peter Kowanko as Gavial
- Adrian Pasdar as Darstar
- Sarah Douglas as Shandray
- Charles Durning as The Warden
- Frank Converse as Greentree
- Terrence Mann as Ivor
- Alexei Sayle as Malice
- Bruce Payne as Dogger
- Willoughby Gray as Canis
- Kelly Bishop as Tutor Nover
- Vin Burnham as Vendor

== Production ==
Executive producer Mel Brooks explained how Solarbabies was made in an episode of the podcast How Did This Get Made? Co-writer Douglas Anthony Metrov was also interviewed for a How Did This Get Made? article for /Film.

Metrov was inspired by the "guerrilla filmmaking" methods of his friend Abel Ferrara to create a low-budget film of his own. He subsequently wrote a 32-page treatment for a science fiction film about a group of children he dubbed the "Little Rascals of the future." The treatment caught the attention of veteran screenwriter Walon Green and Mark Johnson, an employee for Brooks. To pitch the film to potential investors, Metrov filmed a 12-minute slideshow with random kids playing the parts.

Metrov's presentation caught the attention of Brooks, who agreed to make it in Spain due to the lack of unions and cheaper production costs. Brooks also gave Metrov the director's chair. The production was greenlit with a $5 million budget, but Brooks was persuaded by his colleagues to increase the budget under the belief that it had greater potential. An additional $20 million was eventually required to complete the film. Because Metrov had no experience directing a big-budget film, Alan Johnson was hired as a replacement.

The beginning of the shoot encountered delays because of unexpected heavy rains. Later, director Johnson and the cast had so many disagreements that Brooks flew to the set and ordered the cast to get back to work or be fired. Brooks recounted how a number of sequences Johnson shot didn't make sense, or had poor coloration, and more money was needed for additional filming. Finally, more money was needed at the end for special effects.

When production began, Brooks had invested approximately $1.5 million of his own money. As production delays mounted, he invested more, eventually taking out a second mortgage on his home. Brooks was forced to raise an additional $15 million through banks.

Brooks was worried the movie could not be saved, so he cut together a 10-minute trailer for the movie in a sci-fi style similar to Star Wars in order to sell to distributors. When Brooks approached Paramount, Michael Eisner showed interest, but Jeffrey Katzenberg said no. Eventually, Alan Ladd Jr. at MGM agreed to distribute the movie, and connected Brooks with international distributor UIP. The distributor purchased the movie from Brooks for $14 million.

After paying back investors and loans, Brooks estimates he had lost about $9 million of his own money at the time. However, Brooks claimed that over the years since its release, the movie finally did break even, most likely through home video and DVD. Brooks called it a "miracle." Actor Alexei Sayle discussed the film on his podcast in 2024 and described it as a "disaster".

== Release ==
Solarbabies was released in the United States on November 26, 1986. In the Philippines, the film was released by Movierama International on June 23, 1989.

== Reception ==
Reviews for Solarbabies were very poor, with film historian Leonard Maltin describing it thus: "An appalling stinker, the 1980's teen jargon doesn't exactly capture the futuristic mood of this junk." The film was given a BOMB rating in his annual publication.

Joe Kane of The Phantom of the Movies' Videoscope called the picture "A pathetic Mad Max Beyond Thunderdome rip-off, working from a script which must have been scrawled in Crayola, with every futuristic cliché you could possibly imagine. Lacking in originality, but rich in brain-dead dialogue; when Jami Gertz snarls, 'Get out, you creature of filth!', consider that a subliminal message."

Steven H. Scheuer, author of Movies on TV, also slammed the film: "This pic rips off everything from Cool Hand Luke to Dune to Rollerball to Logan's Run to The Warriors and still comes up dry."

Mike Clark, reviewing the film for USA Today, had this message for the filmmakers: "Better pray for a pox on Spock, guys, and fast" (the film was released on the same day as Star Trek IV: The Voyage Home), and added "...we see in a couple of scenes that movies still exist. I'd have thought both civilization and the movies would have been wiped out by '41 [the year in the future the movie is set], thanks to atrocities like Solarbabies."

Gene Siskel, on his syndicated film review show At the Movies, called the movie "trash...Such is what happens when you begin with good characters, costume/production design, special effects, and stunt-work...then scramble to build a plot around it all. The best thing about this picture is its title; rather than a screenplay, it has a barrel of gimmicks." Siskel's colleague Roger Ebert seemed to agree: "You can't expect any cast, no matter how committed, to sell a movie that--apparently--can't decide what it's about. The actors must be given a solid storyline to work with and build on, which neither this film nor its producers have done."

Audiences polled by CinemaScore gave the film an average grade of "C" on an A+ to F scale.

== Home media ==
The film was released on DVD on March 6, 2007. The movie was later given a Blu-ray release, first in Germany by Koch Media on September 25, 2014, then in the US by Kino Lorber on May 10, 2016.
