= Coronet Theatre (Los Angeles) =

Theater in Los Angeles, California, United States

- Interactive map of Coronet Theatre
- Address: 366 North La Cienega Boulevard
- Location: Los Angeles, California
- Coordinates: 34.0779°N 118.3764°W
- Operator: Frieda Berkoff, Petrie Robie, Deborah Del Prete and Gigi Pritzker, present: Mark Flanagan

Construction
- Built: 1947
- Architect: Nelson Barcume

Tenant
- Largo

Website
- coronettheatrela.com

The Coronet Theatre is a theatre located at 366 North La Cienega Boulevard in Los Angeles, California. During its peak in the mid 20th century, it was a legitimate theatre and experimental cinema venue, showing the work of people such as Kenneth Anger, Man Ray, Peter Berg, and Richard Vetere. Over the years its stage has hosted such stars as John Houseman, Charles Laughton, Charlton Heston, Buster Keaton, Ethel Waters, James Coburn, George C. Scott, Carol Burnett, Noah Wyle, and Glenn Close.

The Coronet Theatre building was commissioned and built in 1947 by Frieda Berkoff of the Russian dancing family, the Berkoffs. Frieda and her daughter, Petrie Robie ran the building until 1996 when they sold it to Deborah Del Prete and Gigi Pritzker. In 2008 it was sold to Hersel Saeidy and rented to Mark Flanagan, the owner of Los Angeles's Club Largo. Flanagan moved his entire operation to the new location and renamed it Largo at the Coronet. It now operates as a music and comedy club.

On July 6, 2020, the late night talk show Conan began filming from the Coronet Theatre with limited on-site staff and no audience, as part of a transition from at-home production necessitated by the COVID-19 pandemic (and marking the first U.S. late-night show to transition from at-home episodes); the show's usual set at Warner Bros. Studios, Burbank had already been dismantled. Conan remained at the Coronet through its series finale on June 24, 2021, with its final two weeks of episodes admitting a fully-vaccinated audience.

In 2022, the granddaughter and great-granddaughter of Frida Berkoff nominated the building for Historic-Cultural Monument (HCM) designation in Los Angeles, aiming to honor its dynamic history and significant cultural contributions. The City officially recognized the building by designating it a Historic-Cultural Monument in December 2023.

== Selected list of productions ==
- 1947: Thornton Wilder's The Skin of Our Teeth (west coast premiere) – first production
- 1947: Bertolt Brecht's Life of Galileo (world premiere)
- 1961: Edna St. Vincent Millay's Conversation at Midnight (world premiere)
- 1969: John Herbert's Fortune and Men's Eyes (1969 west coast premiere)
- 1998: Joe DiPietro and Jimmy Roberts's I Love You, You're Perfect, Now Change
- 1999: Howard Crabtree's When Pigs Fly
- 2006: Jonathan Larson's Tick, Tick... Boom!
- 2020–2021: Conan TV show
