= This Can't Be Love (film) =

- VHS cover art
- Genre: Drama; Comedy; Romance
- Written by: Duane Poole
- Directed by: Anthony Harvey
- Starring: Katharine Hepburn; Anthony Quinn; Jason Bateman; Jami Gertz
- Music by: Peter Matz
- Country of origin: United States
- Original language: English

Production
- Executive producers: John Philip Dayton; Merrill H. Karpf; John Davis
- Producers: Tom Rowe; George Horrie; Duane Poole
- Production location: Vancouver
- Cinematography: Larry Pizer
- Editor: Robert M. Reitano (as Robert Reitano)
- Running time: 95 minutes
- Production companies: Davis Entertainment; Pacific Motion Pictures; World International Network; Hamdon Entertainment

Original release
- Network: CBS
- Release: March 13, 1994

This Can't Be Love is a 1994 American made-for-television romantic comedy film directed by Anthony Harvey and starring Katharine Hepburn and Anthony Quinn which premiered on CBS on March 13, 1994.

== Plot ==
Hepburn and Quinn star as two aging actors who had a brief but intense marriage in the 1940s, and are reunited decades later to find that issues between them are not resolved. The film makes references to Hepburn's real career and personality, for instance starring in a Western with John Wayne. Hepburn was 86 and Quinn was 78 when they made the film. Supporting parts are played by Jason Bateman and Jami Gertz.

== Cast ==
- Katharine Hepburn as Marion Bennett
- Anthony Quinn as Michael Reyman
- Jason Bateman as Grant
- Jami Gertz as Sarah
