= Jami Gertz =

American actress (born 1965)

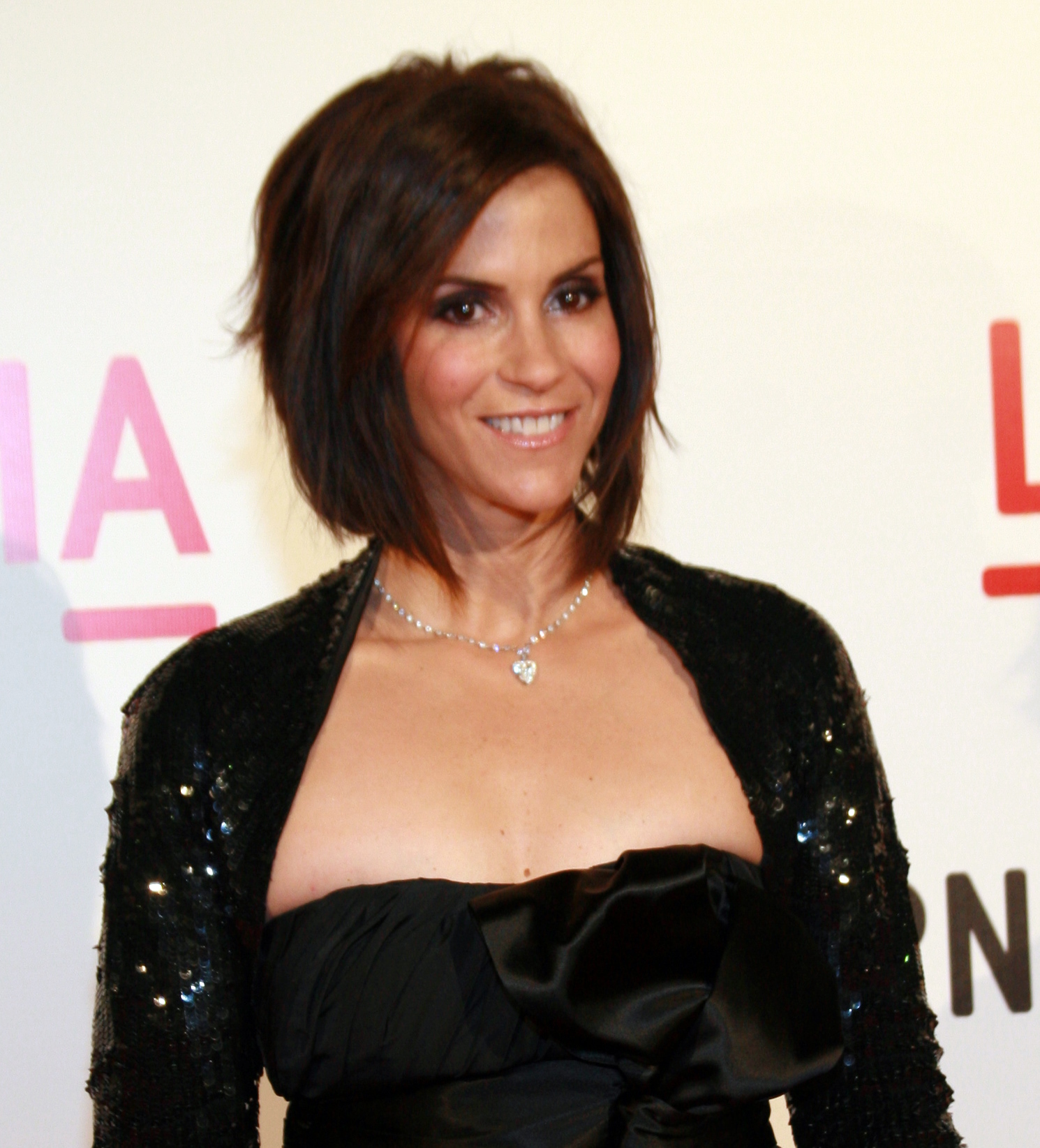
- Gertz in 2008
- Born: Jami Beth Gertz; October 28, 1965 (age 60); Chicago, Illinois, U.S.
- Occupation: Actress
- Years active: 1981–2022
- Spouse: Tony Ressler (m. 1989)
- Children: 4

Jami Beth Gertz (/ˈdʒeɪmi/ JAY-mee; born October 28, 1965) is an American actress and businesswoman. Gertz has performed in the films Crossroads, Quicksilver (both 1986), Less than Zero (1987), The Lost Boys (1987), and Twister (1996). On television, she acted in the 1980s TV series Square Pegs, in the CBS sitcom Still Standing, and in the ABC sitcom The Neighbors. Along with her husband, Tony Ressler, Gertz is an owner of the Atlanta Hawks basketball team.

== Early life ==
Gertz was born in 1965 in Chicago, Illinois, and lived in the suburb of Glenview. She attended public schools, graduating from Maine East High School. Gertz is the daughter of Walter Gertz, who was a builder and contractor, and Sharyn Gertz. She has two brothers, Michael and Scott. Gertz is Jewish; she was raised in Conservative Judaism.

== Career ==
Gertz was discovered by Norman Lear in a nationwide talent search and studied drama at NYU. As a child actor, Gertz was in one episode of Diff'rent Strokes along with Andrew Dice Clay. She also had a recurring role on The Facts of Life as Blair's friend and schoolmate Boots St. Clair. Gertz made her film debut in the 1981 romance film Endless Love, which was followed by a co-starring role in the 1982–83 TV sitcom series Square Pegs. She gained more significant attention with a starring role in 1987's Less than Zero, as the friend of a doomed drug addict played by Robert Downey Jr. She also starred in the 1987 film The Lost Boys alongside Kiefer Sutherland and Jason Patric.

After working in Paris as a scent designer for Lanvin, Gertz returned to the United States. She appeared in films including 1986's Solarbabies and Crossroads, the 1989 film Listen to Me with Kirk Cameron, Don't Tell Her It's Me, and Jersey Girl. In the 1994 episode of Seinfeld, "The Stall", she appeared as one of Jerry's girlfriends, who works as a phone sex operator and cannot "spare a square" of toilet paper for Elaine in the restroom. Also in 1994, she played Sarah in the TV movie This Can't Be Love, starring Katharine Hepburn, Anthony Quinn and Jason Bateman. She landed a supporting role, in the 1996 blockbuster Twister. Gertz later played the recurring character Dr. Nina Pomerantz during the 1997 season of ER. She reportedly was offered, but declined, the role of Rachel Green, during pre-production of Friends.

In 2000, Gertz took up a recurring role on the Fox hit Ally McBeal as Kimmy Bishop, John Cage's love interest. Gertz was nominated for an Emmy for Outstanding Guest Actress in a Comedy Series. She returned to this role in one more episode as a guest star in the show's final season in 2002. Also in 2002, she portrayed comedian Gilda Radner in the television movie Gilda Radner: It's Always Something. Gertz's character on Still Standing, Judy Miller, is named after a character Radner portrayed on Saturday Night Live. Still Standing, a television sitcom in which Gertz co-starred with Mark Addy and which originally aired from 2002 to 2006, was her longest-running and most successful television show to date.

In 2003, Gertz starred as Brandi, a wanted criminal's girlfriend, in Undercover Christmas, and in 2005 Gertz played the lead role in the TV film Fighting the Odds: The Marilyn Gambrell Story. In 2009–10, she had a recurring role as Marlo Klein, wife of Ari Gold's newest business partner Andrew Klein, an agent at Miller-Gold Talent Agency, on HBO's Entourage. In 2011, she returned to broadcast television with a guest role in the Modern Family episode "Slow Down Your Neighbors". In 2011, she earned a producer's credit on the Academy Award-nominated film A Better Life, which was put in limited release throughout the month of June and early July before arriving on DVD in October.

From 2012 to 2014, Gertz starred in the ABC sitcom The Neighbors, in which she played the mother of a human family that moves into a neighborhood populated by residents from another planet.

== Business endeavors ==
Gertz and her husband, private equity investor Tony Ressler, are members of the investment group led by Mark Attanasio that purchased the Milwaukee Brewers of Major League Baseball. They also became owners of the Atlanta Hawks of the National Basketball Association (NBA) in 2015. Gertz represented the Hawks in the NBA draft lottery for the 2018, 2019 and 2020 NBA drafts.

== Philanthropy ==
The Giving Back Fund named Gertz and Ressler as the top celebrity charitable donors in 2010. Gertz serves as a board member of the Melanoma Research Alliance, the largest nonprofit funder of melanoma research.

== Personal life ==
Gertz married Tony Ressler in 1989. Gertz and Ressler have a daughter and three sons.

== Filmography ==
=== Film ===
Year	Title	Role	Notes
1981	On the Right Track	Big Girl	
1981	Endless Love	Patty	
1984	Sixteen Candles	Robin	
1984	Alphabet City	Sophia	
1985	Mischief	Rosalie	
1986	Quicksilver	Terri	
1986	Crossroads	Frances	
1986	Solarbabies	Terra	
1987	The Lost Boys	Star	
1987	Less than Zero	Blair	
1989	Listen to Me	Monica Tomanski	
1989	Renegades	Barbara	
1989	Silence Like Glass	Eva Martin	
1990	Don't Tell Her It's Me	Emily Pear	
1990	Sibling Rivalry	Jeanine	
1992	Jersey Girl	Toby	
1994	This Can't Be Love	Sarah	
1996	Twister	Dr. Melissa Reeves	Stinkers Bad Movie Award for Worst Supporting Actress; Nominated – Golden Raspberry Award for Worst Supporting Actress
1999	Seven Girlfriends	Lisa	
2001	Lip Service	Kat	
2006	Keeping Up with the Steins	Joanne Fielder	
2013	Dealin' with Idiots	Rosie	
2022	I Want You Back	Rita	

=== Television ===
Year	Title	Role	Notes
1982–1983	Square Pegs	Muffy Tepperman	Regular role; 20 episodes
1983	Diff'rent Strokes	Lindsay	Episode: "My Fair Larry"
1983	For Members Only	Monica Mitchell	Television film
1984	Dreams	Martha Spino	Regular role; 12 episodes
1983–1984	The Facts of Life	Boots St. Claire	Recurring role; 4 episodes
1984	Family Ties	Jocelyn Clark	Episode: "Double Date"
1991–1992	Sibs	Lily Ruscio	Regular role; 22 episodes
1994	Seinfeld	Jane	Episode: "The Stall"
1994	This Can't Be Love	Sarah	Television film
1994	Dream On	Jane Harnick	Episodes: "The Taking of Pablum - Part 1 & Part 2"
1994	Related by Birth	Lily	Television short
1995	Dream On	Martin's Lover	Episode: "Take Two Tablets, and Get Me to Mt. Sinai"
1995	Hudson Street	Allison	Episode: "Bells & Whistles"
1997	ER	Dr. Nina Pomerantz	Recurring role; 6 episodes
2001	True Love		Television film
2000–2002	Ally McBeal	Kimmy Bishop	Recurring role; 6 episodes Nominated – Primetime Emmy Award for Outstanding Guest Actress in a Comedy Series
2002	Gilda Radner: It's Always Something	Gilda Radner	Television film
2003	Undercover Christmas	Brandi O'Neill	Television film
2005	Fighting the Odds: The Marilyn Gambrell Story	Marilyn Gambrell	Television film
2002–2006	Still Standing	Judy Miller	Regular role; 88 episodes Nominated – Young Artist Award for Most Popular Mom & Pop in a Television Series (shared with Mark Addy)
2006	Shark	Sara Metcalfe	Episode: "Sins of the Mother"
2007	Lost Holiday: The Jim & Suzanne Shemwell Story	Suzanne Shemwell	Television film
2009–2010	Entourage	Marlo Klein	Recurring role; 5 episodes
2011	Modern Family	Laura	Episode: "Slow Down Your Neighbors"
2012–2014	The Neighbors	Debbie Weaver	Regular role; 44 episodes
2016	This Is Us	Marin Rosenthal	Episode: “Career Days"
2017	Difficult People	David's Wife	Episode: "Bernie and Blythe"
