= Randlett =

Randlett may refer to:

- Randlett, Utah
- Randlett, Oklahoma
- Randlett House, located in Lancaster, Texas
- Randlett (surname), people named Randlett
