= Lancaster High School (Texas) =

Coordinates: 32°37′00″N 96°45′42″W

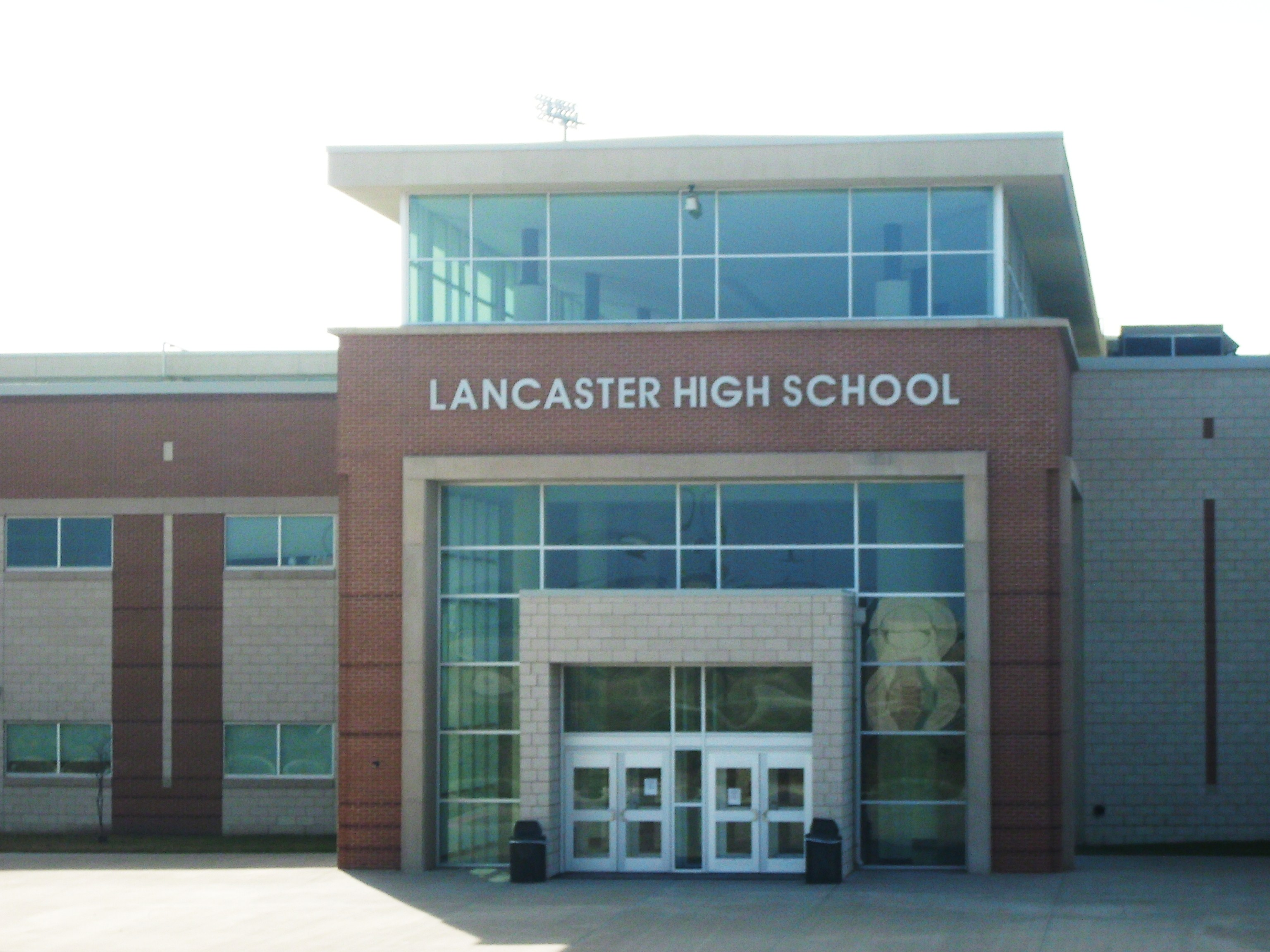

Location
- 200 East Wintergreen Road; Lancaster, Texas 75134; USA

Information
- Type: Public high school
- Motto: Thinking Beyond Exemplary!
- Established: 1905
- School district: Lancaster Independent School District
- Principal: Kirsten Jett
- Staff: 123.44 (FTE)
- Grades: 10-12
- Enrollment: 2,313 (2023-2024)
- Student to teacher ratio: 18.74
- Campus size: 421,000 sq. ft.
- Campus type: Suburban
- Colors: Orange, Black, Gray and White
- Mascot: Tiger
- Feeder schools: Lancaster Elsie Robertson Middle School
- UIL designation: 5A (Note: In 2024, Lancaster High School changed from 5A to 6A.)
- Website: www.lancasterisd.org/o/stem

Lancaster High School is a public secondary school in Lancaster, Texas (USA). It is part of the Lancaster Independent School District and serves students in grades nine* through twelve.

The district (of which this is the sole comprehensive high school) includes most of the city of Lancaster, a small portion of Dallas, a small portion of the city of Hutchins, and the census-designated place of Bear Creek Ranch.

== History ==
A fully comprehensive public education established in Lancaster in 1905 with the formation of the Lancaster Independent School District. The William L. White School opened that same year, serving students in grades 1-12.

As the district grew, a new high school located on Centre Avenue (site of the LISD current administration building) opened in 1923. Lancaster High School was accepted to the Southern Association of Colleges and Schools in 1929, becoming the first such in Dallas County to receive that designation.

The high school moved to another location, 822 West Pleasant Run Road, in 1965. The name of Lancaster High School was changed to Lancaster Elsie Robertson High School in 1978 to honor Elsie Robertson, a counselor and teacher who served Lancaster students for 47 years.

Spurred by rapid population in both the city and school district, Lancaster voters approved a $110 million bond package in February 2004 - $65.3 million of which was dedicated to the construction of a new high school complex with athletic facilities, a stadium, and an auditorium.

The site chosen for the complex was a plot of land located immediately north of the 170 acre Lancaster Community Park. Construction commenced in August 2004 and was completed in July 2006. The new Lancaster High School campus opened on August 21, 2006 at the start of the 2006-2007 school year. The old high school site at 822 West Pleasant Run Road now serves as the district's middle school.

The school houses International Baccalaureate and STEM Early College programs for its high-achieving students committed to furthering their education at a college.

== Statistics ==
As of the 2014 school year, there were a total of 1,748 students enrolled at Lancaster High School. The ethnic composition of the school was students). 61.5% of the Lancaster High School student body was considered Economically Disadvantaged with 60.0% classified as "At-Risk." A small percentage of students (1.5%) were Limited English Proficient, while an even smaller percentage (0.8%) had disciplinary placements during the previous school year.

Student enrollment in the following specialty programs was as follows in 2007-2008: Bilingual/ESL Education (1.4%), Career & Technology Education (75.4%), Gifted & Talented Education (4.3%), and Special Education (9.7%).

A total of 301 students graduated from Lancaster High School in 2007. Of those, 287 (95.3%) graduated on either the Recommended High School Plan or the Distinguished Achievement Plan. The remaining 14 students (4.7%) completed the Minimum Graduation Plan.

In 2009, the state classified 22% of Lancaster High's graduates as "college ready," or ready to undergo university studies. The State of Texas defined "college readiness" by scores on the ACT and SAT and in the 11th grade Texas Assessment of Knowledge and Skills (TAKS) tests. During that year, 86% of its 12th grade students graduated. LISD officials said that they are taking steps to increase the rate of college readiness. Holly K. Hacker of The Dallas Morning News said that Lancaster High may have been affected by institutional issues in LISD.

== Athletics ==
Lancaster High School mascot

Lancaster competes in 5A; as of 2026 after UIL realignment.

=== Track and Field ===
Lancaster has one of the top high school track programs in Texas. The Lady Tigers have won 15 State Titles in 2001, 2002, 2003, 2004, 2005, 2006, 2007, 2008, 2012, 2013, 2014, 2019, 2021, 2025 and 2026. Lancaster boys' track and field also have a strong winning tradition, earning their 7th straight UIL Track Title in 2011.

=== Football ===
4A/D2 UIL State Championship Runner Up in 2012. Tigers football team faced Cedar Park in the state championship game losing 7-17 due to 10 unanswered points in the 4th Quarter.

=== Basketball ===
- The Boys' Basketball team earned Lancaster High's first trip to the State final in 2010. The game matched Lancaster up against state and national #1 ranked Houston Yates; Lancaster kept it close and even pulled ahead in the 4th quarter before Yates ended the game on a 19-2 run, winning 92-73. John Bohannon became the first player in UIL history with triple-doubles in both State tournament games. Guard Tre Lynch earned All-Tournament honors. The game was played in front of a sold out Frank Irwin Center of 16,734 people; the biggest crowd in Texas High School basketball history. The Tigers finished 36-3.
- In 2015, the Lancaster Tigers basketball team faced Beaumont Ozen in the 2015 5-A UIL State Championship game. With Lancaster defeating Ozen 59-47 to claim the State Title and finishing the season ranked #1 in class 5-A, #2 overall in Texas, and #8 nationally. The Tigers finished their 2014-2015 historic season with a record of 34-4.
- In 2016, the Lancaster boys' basketball team won the 5-A UIL State Championship ending the season 35-2 record.
- On March 7, 2026 the Lady Tiger basketball team claimed the girls first state title in school history; knocking off undefeated (40-0) #1 State ranked and #12 nationally ranked Austin Westlake 51-37; claiming the 6A-DII State title.

=== Band ===
In 1986, the marching band earned 2nd place in prelims of the UIL state marching band contest. The Tiger Pride Marching Band of Lancaster High School has a high-stepping marching band resembling the musical style of HBCU marching bands. The LHS Band has also performed at Earl Spence Jr.'s fight and given another opportunity to perform at the Dallas Wings Home Basketball Game Which was a Dallas Wings W 71-61.

== School uniforms ==
All Lancaster ISD students are required to wear school uniforms.

High schoolers may wear:

- Orange, Black, and Grey solid shirts
- White, Orange, and Black solid polo shirts and turtlenecks
- White, Orange, Gray, and Black solid vests, and sweatshirts
- Solid color jackets and windbreakers
- White Oxford shirts
- Khaki, Black, Navy blue, and Orange slacks (Capris are not allowed)
- Khaki, Black, Navy blue, Orange, and White shorts and skirts (Skorts are not allowed)

== Notable alumni ==
- Thomas Hill (class of 1989): former guard at Duke University
- Adrian Madise (Class of 1998): NFL Wide Receiver Denver Broncos, Tampa Bay Buccaneers
- Eddie Moten (class of 2000): former Arena Football League cornerback
- Jacques Reeves (class of 2000): former Dallas Cowboys, Houston Texans, and Kansas City Chiefs cornerback
- Dorrough (class of 2005): rapper
- Demontre Hurst (class of 2009): American football cornerback
- Michale Kyser (class of 2010): basketball player for Hapoel Holon in the Israeli Basketball Premier League
- Jalen Mills (class of 2012): NFL cornerback for the New York Giants
- Demarcus Ayers (class of 2013): former NFL and CFL wide receiver
- Daeshon Hall (class of 2013): NFL defensive end for the San Francisco 49ers
- Elijah Thomas (class of 2015): Professional basketball player for Bnei Herzliya in the Israeli Basketball Premier League
- TJ Starks (class of 2017): basketball player who plays overseas
- Cam Camper (class of 2020): NFL wide receiver for the Jacksonville Jaguars
- Latrell Caples (class of 2020): college football wide receiver for the Boise State Broncos
- Mike Miles Jr. (class of 2020): basketball player for the Paisas Basketball
- Wade Taylor IV (class of 2021): basketball player for the Milwaukee Bucks
- Kyson Brown (class of 2023): college football running back for the Arizona State Sun Devils
- Kewan Lacy (class of 2024): college football running back for the Ole Miss Rebels

== Gallery ==
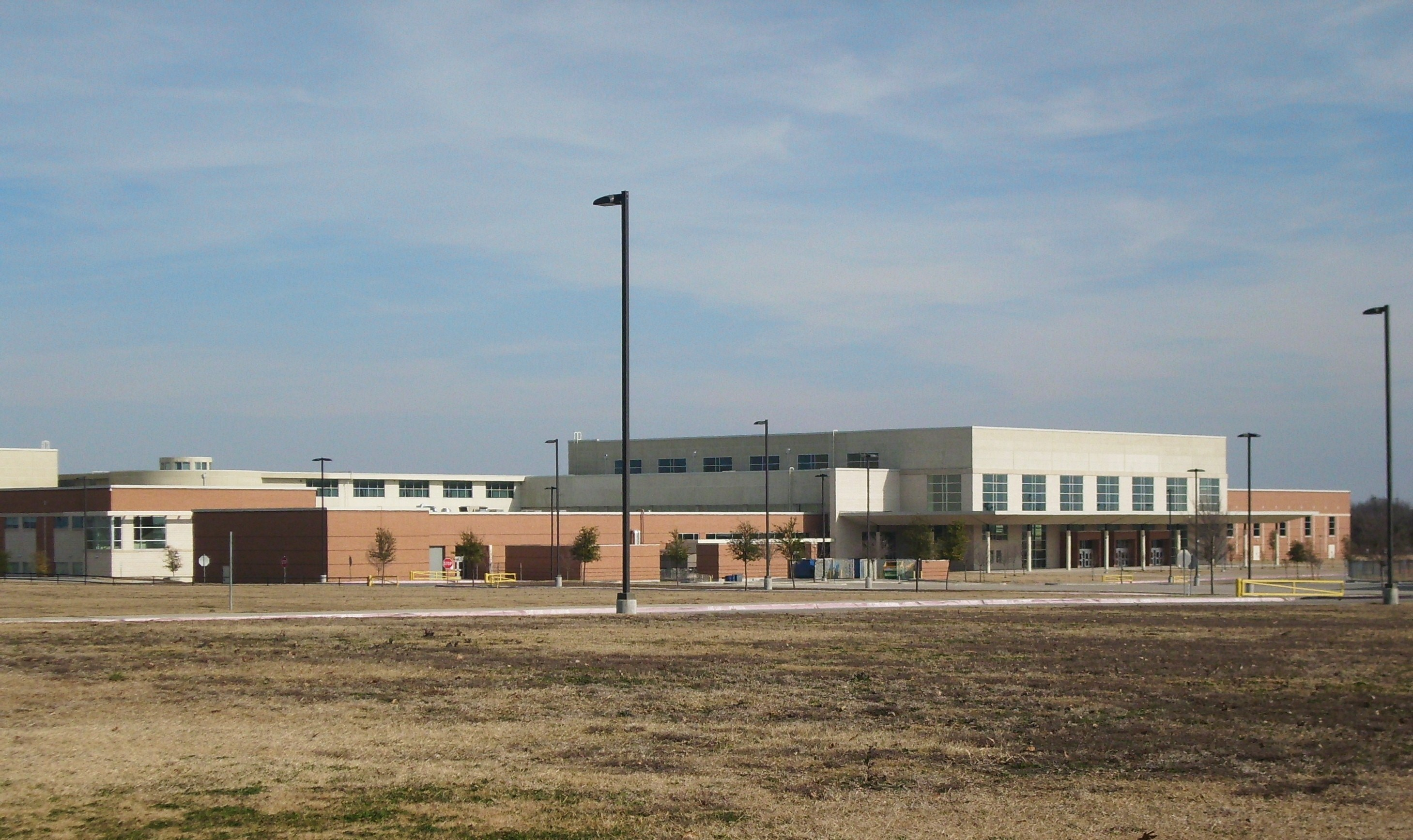
Lancaster High School (rear view)

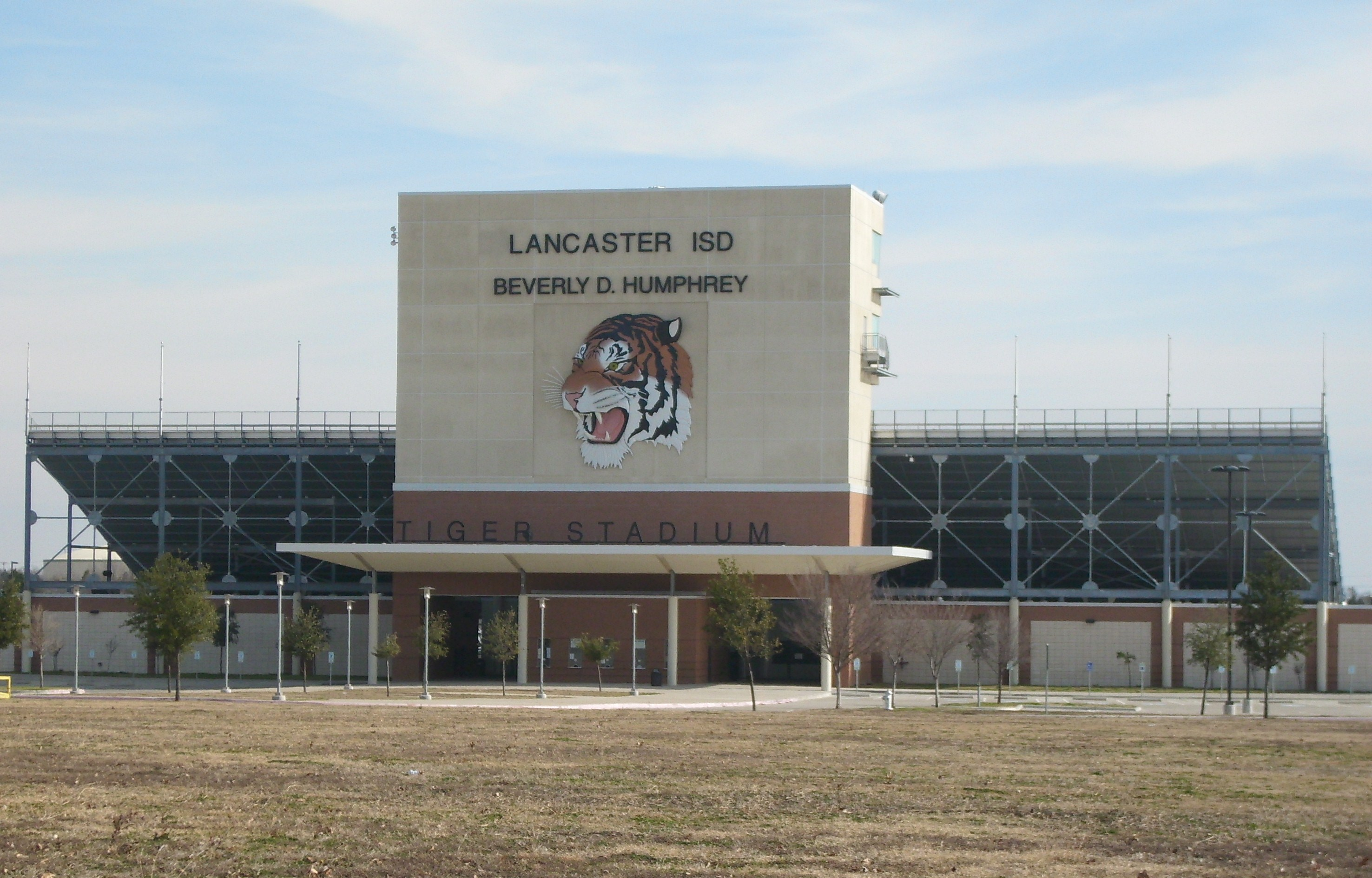
Beverly D. Humphrey Tiger Stadium
