= Adrian Madise =

American football player (born 1980)

No. 82
- Position: Wide receiver

Personal information
- Born: March 23, 1980 (age 46); Lancaster, Texas, U.S.
- Listed height: 5 ft 11 in (1.80 m)
- Listed weight: 215 lb (98 kg)

Career information
- High school: Lancaster
- College: TCU
- NFL draft: 2003: 5th round, 158th overall pick

Career history
- Denver Broncos (2003–2004); Tampa Bay Buccaneers (2004); Tennessee Titans (2005)*; Winnipeg Blue Bombers (2006)*; Austin Wranglers (2007)*; Washington Redskins (2007)*; Hamilton Tiger-Cats (2008)*
- * Offseason or practice squad member only
- Stats at Pro Football Reference
- Stats at ArenaFan.com

Adrian James Madise (born March 23, 1980) is an American former professional football player who was a wide receiver for the Denver Broncos of the National Football League (NFL). He was selected by the Broncos in the fifth round of the 2003 NFL draft after playing college football for the TCU Horned Frogs.

== Early life ==
Madise attended Lancaster High School in Lancaster, Texas.

== College career ==
He played college football at Texas Christian University. He caught 50 passes for 819 yards and five touchdowns in his junior year with the Horned Frogs in 2001, and 32 passes for 524 yards and two touchdowns his senior year in 2002.

== Professional career ==
Madise was selected by the Denver Broncos in the fifth round, with the 158th overall pick, of the 2003 NFL draft. In June 2003, he signed a five-year contract with the Broncos. He played in 11 games for the Broncos in 2003, catching two passes for 10 yards, returning five kicks for 137 yards and rushing once for 10 yards. His longest gain for the Broncos was an 83-yard kickoff return. Madise also fumbled once and recorded one solo tackle that season. On September 5, 2004, he was suspended four games for using anabolic steroids. He was reinstated on October 4. He was waived by the Broncos on October 11, 2004.

Madise signed with the Tampa Bay Buccaneers on October 12, 2004. He was waived on October 19, 2004. He was later re-signed by the Buccaneers on January 7, 2005. Madise was waived again on August 8, 2005.

He was signed by the Tennessee Titans on August 9, 2005. He was waived on August 29, 2005.

Madise later signed with the Winnipeg Blue Bombers of the Canadian Football League (CFL) but was released on June 4, 2006.

He signed with the Austin Wranglers of the Arena Football League in November 2006. He was waived on February 11, 2007.

Madise signed with the Washington Redskins on May 7, 2007. He was waived by the Redskins on May 10, 2007.

He was signed by the Hamilton Tiger-Cats of the CFL on May 7, 2008. However, he was released later in May.

== Coaching career ==
Madise has served a variety of coaching roles at different high schools in Texas. He was also an assistant coach at Lamar. He was named the new head coach at Hillcrest High School in Dallas in March 2024.
