= Bear Creek Ranch, Texas =

- Census-designated place
- Location within Texas Location within the United States
- Coordinates: 32°33′44″N 96°45′45″W
- Country: United States
- State: Texas
- County: Dallas

Area
  - Total: 0.60 sq mi (1.56 km^{2})
  - Land: 0.60 sq mi (1.56 km^{2})
  - Water: 0 sq mi (0.0 km^{2})
- Elevation: 560 ft (170 m)

Population (2020)
  - Total: 1,787
- Time zone: UTC-6 (Central (CST))
  - Summer (DST): UTC-5 (CDT)
- ZIP Code: 75146 (Lancaster)
- Area codes: 214, 469, 945, 972
- FIPS code: 48-06244
- GNIS feature ID: 2805770

Bear Creek Ranch is a planned community and census-designated place (CDP) in Dallas County, Texas, United States. It was first listed as a CDP in the 2020 census with a population of 1,787.

It is in the southern part of the county, on the southeast side of Texas State Highway 342, which leads north 2 miles (3 km) to Lancaster and 9 miles (14 km) to the southern part of Dallas, while to the south it leads 3 miles (5 km) to the eastern part of Red Oak. Downtown Dallas is 17 miles (27 km) to the north, and Waxahachie is 13 miles (21 km) to the south.

== Education ==
It is in the Lancaster Independent School District. The zoned elementary school is West Main Elementary School. The district-wide secondary schools are: George Washington Carver 6th Grade Center, Elsie Robertson Lancaster Middle School, and Lancaster High School.

== Demographics ==
Historical population
Census	Pop.	Note	%±
2020	1,787		—
U.S. Decennial Census; 1850–1900 1910; 1920 1930 1940; 1950 1960 1970; 1980 1990 2000; 2010 2020

Bear Creek Ranch first appeared as a census designated place in the 2020 U.S. census.

Bear Creek Ranch, Texas – Racial and ethnic composition Note: the US Census treats Hispanic/Latino as an ethnic category. This table excludes Latinos from the racial categories and assigns them to a separate category. Hispanics/Latinos may be of any race.
Race / Ethnicity (NH = Non-Hispanic)	Pop 2020	% 2020
White alone (NH)	54	3.02%
Black or African American alone (NH)	1,444	80.81%
Native American or Alaska Native alone (NH)	2	0.11%
Asian alone (NH)	13	0.73%
Native Hawaiian or Pacific Islander alone (NH)	0	0.00%
Other race alone (NH)	7	0.39%
Mixed race or Multiracial (NH)	39	2.18%
Hispanic or Latino (any race)	228	12.76%
Total	1,787	100.00%
