= Lancaster Independent School District =

School district in Texas, United States

Coordinates: 32.5884°N 96.7558°W

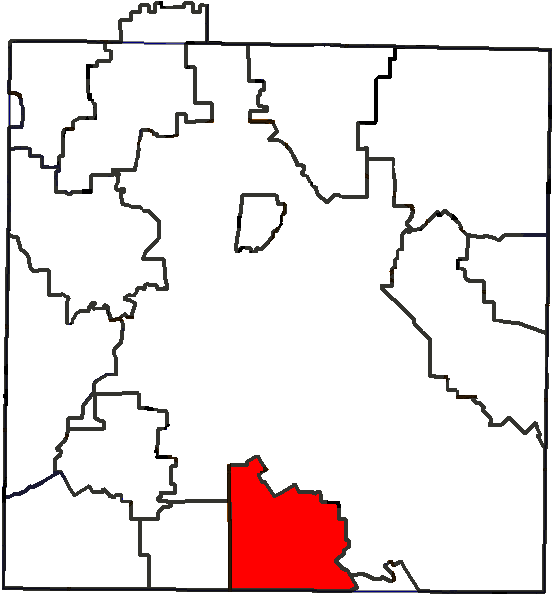
- Location of Lancaster ISD in Dallas County

Location
- Lancaster, Texas; United States

District information
- Type: Public
- Superintendent: Dr. A. Katrise Lee-Perera
- Enrollment: 6,234 (2006-2007)

Other information
- Website: www.lancasterisd.org

Lancaster Independent School District is a public school district based in Lancaster, Texas (US). The district serves most of the city of Lancaster, a small portion of Dallas, a small portion of the city of Hutchins, and the census-designated place of Bear Creek Ranch.

In 2010, the school district was rated "academically acceptable" by the Texas Education Agency.

== Schools ==
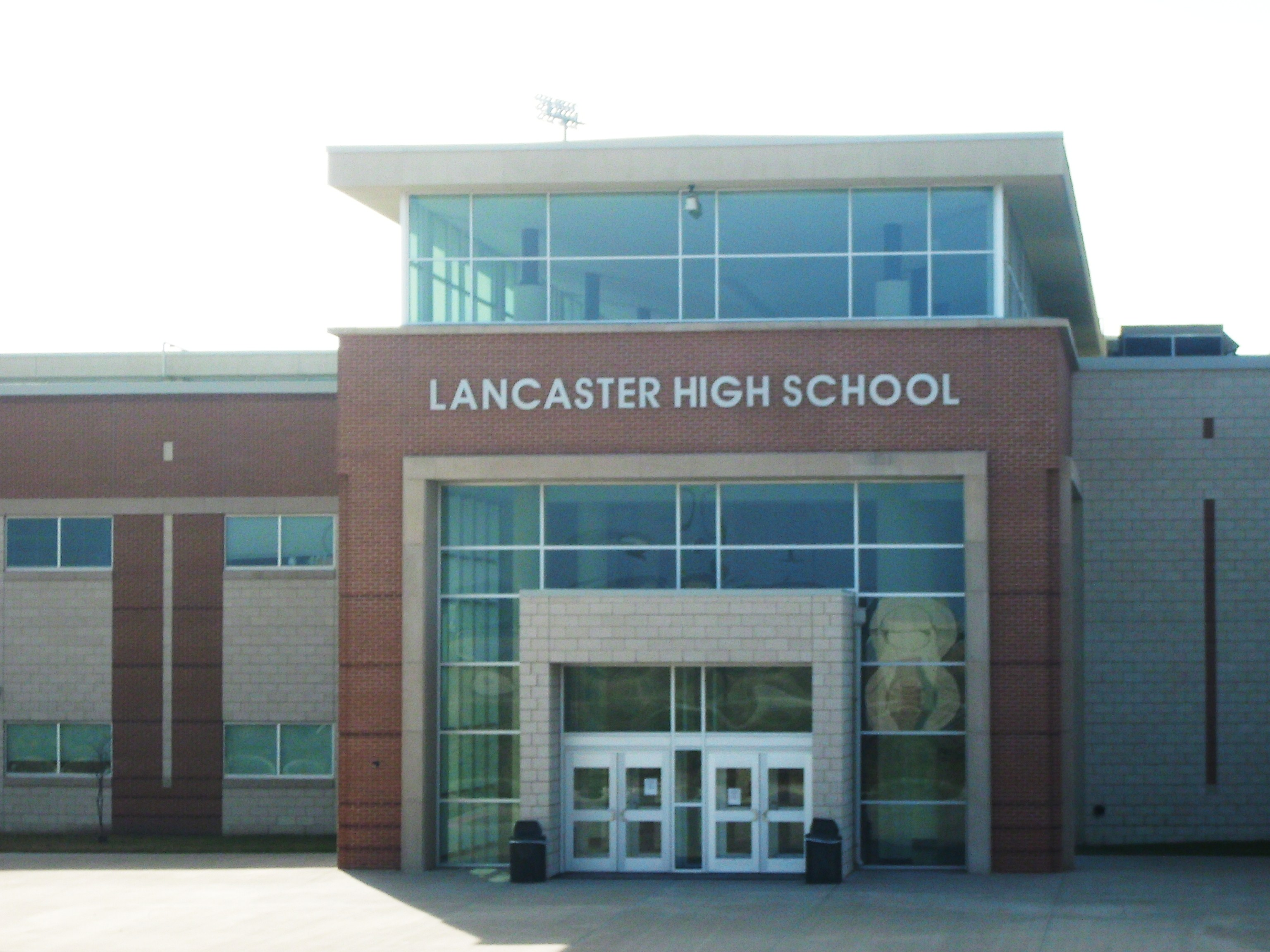
Lancaster High School

=== High School (Grades 9-12) ===
- Lancaster High School

=== Middle School (Grades 6-8) ===
- Elsie Robertson Lancaster Middle School STEM Engagement Center
- George Washington Carver 6th Grade Center

=== Elementary Schools (Grades PK-5) ===
- Belt Line Elementary School (opened fall 2006; formerly Lancaster Intermediate)
- Houston Elementary School
- Lancaster Elementary School (opened fall 2006; formerly Lancaster Junior High)
- Pleasant Run Elementary School
- Rolling Hills Elementary School
- Rosa Parks/Millbrook Elementary School
- West Main Elementary School

== Leadership ==
The district is led by a superintendent as well as a seven-member board of trustees. The superintendent is appointed by the board of trustees as its chief executive officer. The current superintendent is Dr. A. Katrise Lee-Perera.

Members of the board of trustees are elected from seven single-member districts to serve staggered three-year terms. The board's main responsibilities include funding the maintenance and operation of district schools, approving district personnel, submitting bond issues to voters for the construction of school facilities, and general management of the district. School board elections take place in May.

- LISD Board of Trustees (current term)
  - District 1 – Marion Hamilton (2009–2012)
  - District 2 – Cynthia Corbin-Jarvis (2009–2012)
  - District 3 – Jeff Melcher (2010–2013)
  - District 4 – Irene Mejia (2008–2011)
  - District 5 – Joe Kana (2008–2011)
  - District 6 – Marjorie King (2007–2010)
  - District 7 – Ellen Clark (2009–2011)

== District history ==
=== Early years ===
The history of education in Lancaster dates back to 1846. That year, the first school – housed in a one-room log cabin – opened in the area. A tuition of ten cents per student per day was the initial teacher pay. In 1857, the first frame school house was built near the present-day intersection of Jefferson and Third Streets. It was private and tuition based. A school tax was instituted in 1869.

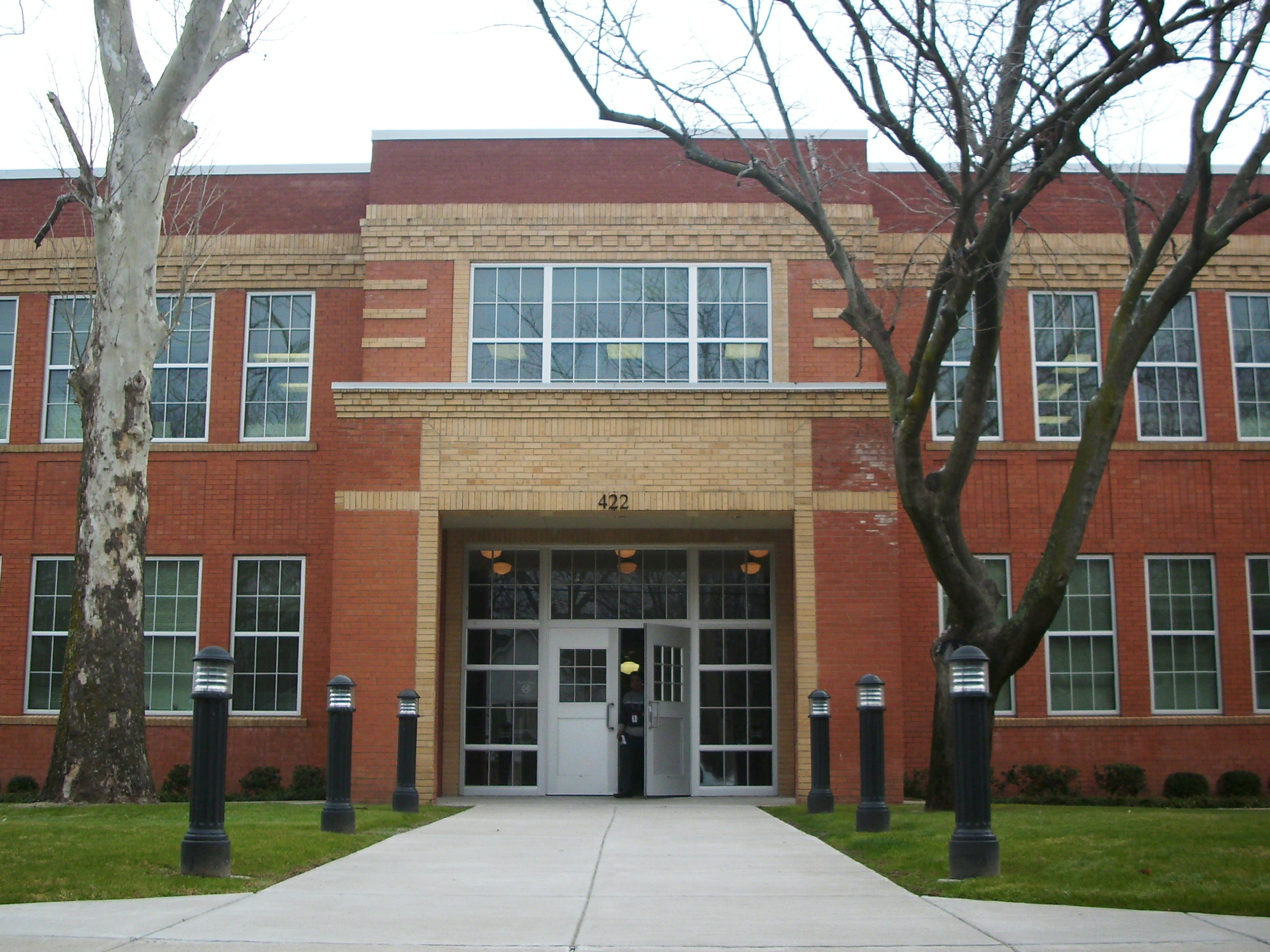
The Lancaster ISD Administration Building and former High School campus (1923-1965) on 422 South Centre Avenue.

=== Creation of LISD ===
In 1902, citizens petitioned for a bond and tax election to be held for the purpose of constructing a public school building. The Lancaster Independent School District was established in 1905. The William L. White School opened that same year, serving students in grades 1-12. A new high school located on Centre Avenue (site of the current administration building) opened in 1923. Lancaster High School was accepted to the Southern Association of Colleges and Schools in 1929, becoming the first such in Dallas County to receive this designation.

=== Growth and change ===
Lancaster's population began to rise significantly during the 1950s. Three schools were built during this period to accommodate the growing number of students. The first, Lancaster Elementary (present-day West Main Elementary) opened in 1951. Pleasant Run Elementary and Rocky Crest Elementary, a campus for African-Americans, both opened in 1955. In 1965, Lancaster High School moved to another location – 822 West Pleasant Run Road. This was followed two years later by the opening of Houston Elementary. Houston became the first school in Lancaster to have a Kindergarten program.

In 1970, Lancaster Middle School was built at 1005 Westridge Avenue to house the district's 6th, 7th, and 8th graders. The name of Lancaster High School was officially changed to Lancaster Elsie Robertson High School in 1980 to honor Elsie Robertson, a teacher who had served Lancaster students for 47 years. Lancaster Intermediate School (currently Belt Line Elementary) opened in 1984 to serve 5th and 6th graders. Three additional campuses opened in the late 1980s – Millbrook (now Rosa Parks/Millbrook) Elementary in 1986, Rolling Hills Elementary in 1989, and Lancaster Junior High in 1989.

As the city and the district continued to grow, it began to diversify. The percentage of European-American students in the district fell below 50% during the 1992–1993 school year. At the same time, there was a significant increase in the number of African-American students. By the 1995–1996 school year, a majority of Lancaster ISD students were African-American. These trends – a declining number of European-American students, an increasing number of African-American students as well as a slower, but steadily growing number of Hispanic students continue to this date. Hispanics displaced European-Americans as the district's largest minority group in the 2001–2002 school year.

=== Recent history ===
In 2005 Larry Lewis, superintendent of the district, said that the affluence within some students in the district lead to apathy regarding school performance. Lewis said "Johnny has his own room, his own computer, his own DVD player, his own XBox, his own everything, but he brings home C's and F's. He'll eventually get his own car, and he thinks life is going to be that way the rest of his life. His priorities aren't what they should be."

==== Wilmer-Hutchins merger proposal ====
When the Texas Education Agency asked for neighboring districts to take over the troubled Wilmer-Hutchins Independent School District in mid-2005, Lancaster ISD was given the first offer. Lancaster school board trustees rejected the proposal and the Dallas Independent School District eventually agreed to educate Wilmer-Hutchins students. Four members of the board voted to reject the merger while the other three favored it.

==== 2006 grade & school reconfiguration ====
The district approved a plan to reconfigure grades served at each school, which took effect at the beginning of the 2006–2007 school year. Under the old system, elementary schools served grades pre-kindergarten through four, the intermediate school served grades five and six, the junior high grades seven and eight, and the high school grades nine through twelve.

The new system abolished the need for an intermediate campus by moving fifth graders to elementary schools and sixth graders to the middle school. The district's intermediate and junior high schools were converted into two elementary campuses - Belt Line Elementary and Lancaster Elementary, respectively.

The grade reconfiguration coincided with the opening of a new high school at 200 East Wintergreen Road. The old high school campus now houses the district's middle school.

Also, a new and larger Houston Elementary School campus opened to accommodate growth in the northern portion of Lancaster.

==== Proposed schedule change ====
On Wednesday, August 1, 2007 Lancaster ISD officials have withdrawn its request with the state of Texas to launch a 4-day school week until the 2008–09 school year. This proposal was made on Monday, July 16, 2007 in an effort to save $1.8 Million. This would also mean longer weekends for students, but in order for this to work, students would have to stay in school for up to 2 extra hours Monday-Thursday. Since the proposal was made, it drew some criticism. Superintendent Larry Lewis said that the district will not face a shortfall if the state didn't approve the 4-day school week proposal; however, Lancaster ISD will have a reserve of only $971,000 to handle unexpected expenses.

== Student demographics ==
Lancaster ISD student demographic figures as of the 2006–2007 school year:

=== Ethnicity ===
African American	4,881	78.3%
Hispanic	1,105	17.7%
European-American	227	3.6%
Native American	10	0.2%
Asian	11	0.2%
Total	6,234	100.0%

In 1997 31.2% of the district's student body was non-Hispanic white. From 1997 until 2016 the number of non-Hispanic white students declined by 89%. In 2016 2.1% of the student body was non-Hispanic white. From 1997 to 2016 the number of students on free or reduced lunches, a way of designating someone as low income, increased by 237%, making the percentage of the students being on free or reduced lunches being similar to that of Dallas ISD. Eric Nicholson of the Dallas Observer wrote that because of the "relatively small" sizes of southern Dallas County school districts, the demographic changes were relatively more severe compared to districts in other parts of the county.

== School uniforms ==
All Lancaster ISD students are required to wear school uniforms.

Pre-Kindergarteners and Elementary schoolers may wear:

- Red, White, and Blue solid polo shirts, turtlenecks, vests, and sweatshirts
- Solid color jackets and windbreakers
- White Oxford shirts
- Khaki and Navy blue bottoms (Skorts and Capris are not allowed)

Middle schoolers may wear:

- Gray, White, and Yellow solid polo shirts and turtlenecks, vests, and sweatshirts
- Solid color jackets and windbreakers
- White Oxford shirts
- Khaki, Black, and Navy blue bottoms (Skorts and Capris are not allowed)

High schoolers may wear:

- White, Orange, and Black solid polo shirts and turtlenecks
- White, Orange, Gray, and Black solid vests, and sweatshirts
- Solid color jackets and windbreakers
- White Oxford shirts
- Khaki, Black, Navy blue, and Orange slacks (Capris are not allowed)
- Khaki, Black, Navy blue, Orange, and White shorts and skirts (Skorts are not allowed)

== See also ==
- List of school districts in Texas
