= Charity shop =

Retail establishment run by a charitable organization to raise money

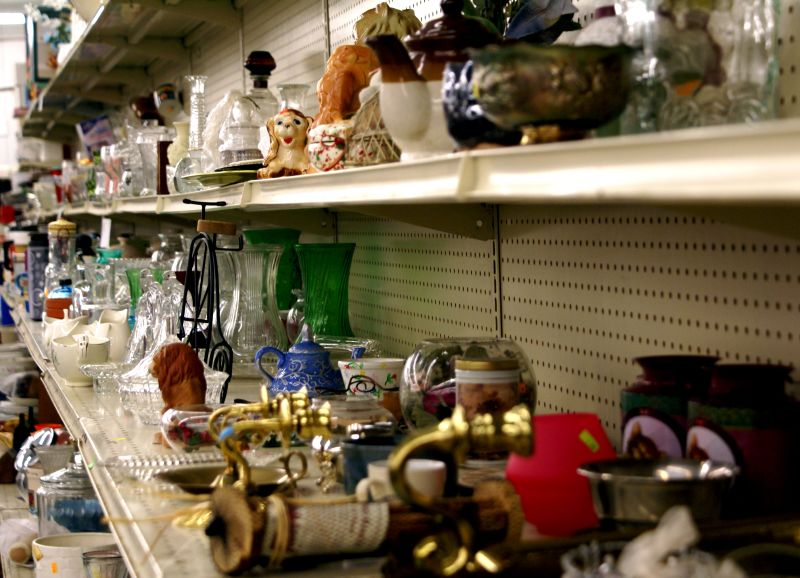
Shelves in a thrift store in Indianapolis, Indiana

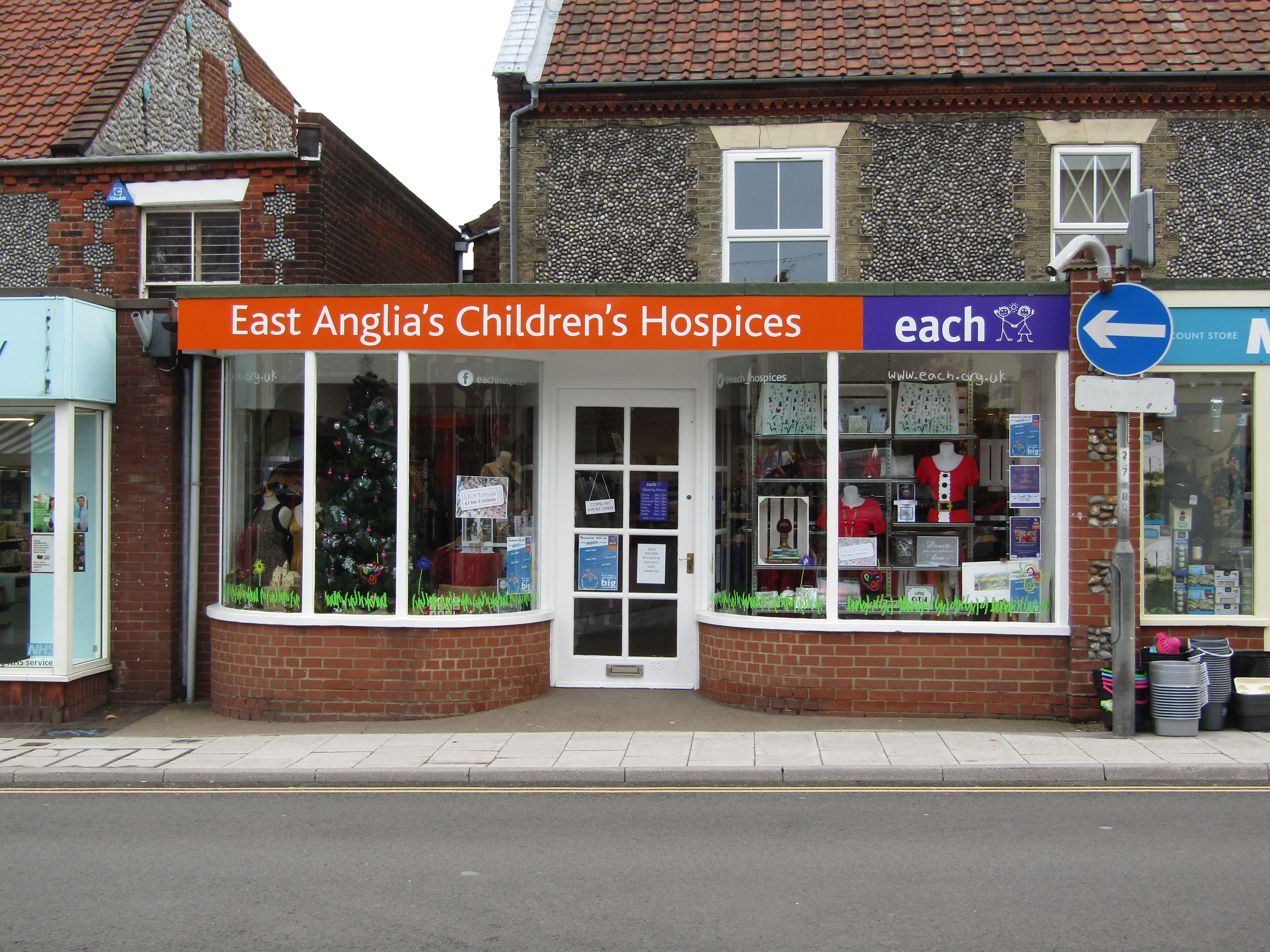
A charity shop in Sheringham, UK

A charity shop is a retail establishment run by a charitable organization to raise money. Charity shops are a type of social enterprise. They sell mainly used goods such as clothing, books, collectibles, music albums, shoes, toys, and furniture donated by the public, and are often staffed by volunteers. Because the items for sale were obtained for free, and business costs are low, the items can be sold at competitive prices. After costs are paid, all remaining income from the sales is used in accord with the organization's stated charitable purpose. Costs include purchase and/or depreciation of fixtures (clothing racks, bookshelves, counters, etc.), operating costs (maintenance, municipal service fees, electricity, heat, telephone, limited advertising) and the building lease or mortgage.

Shopping can be done in a physical shop, or online. Some charity shops are online only.

== Terminology ==
Charity shops may also be referred to as thrift stores in the United States and Canada (a term which also includes some for-profit stores such as Savers), hospice shops, resale shops (a term that in the United States also covers consignment shops), opportunity (or op) shops in Australia and New Zealand, and second-hands (секонд-хенды) in Russia.

== History ==
One of the earliest known charity shops in the United Kingdom was set up by the Wolverhampton Society for the Blind (now called the Beacon Centre for the Blind) in 1899 to sell goods made by blind people to raise money for the Society. During World War I, various fund-raising activities occurred, such as a charity bazaar in Shepherd Market, London, which made £50,000 for the Red Cross.

However, it was during the Second World War that the charity shop became widespread. Edinburgh University Settlement opened their "Thrift Shop for Everyone" in Edinburgh in 1937, the Red Cross opened up its first charity shop at 17 Old Bond Street, London in 1941. For the duration of the war, over two hundred "permanent" Red Cross gift shops and about 150 temporary Red Cross shops were opened. A condition of the shop licence issued by the Board of Trade was that all goods offered for sale were gifts. Purchase for re-sale was forbidden. The entire proceeds from sales had to be passed to the Duke of Gloucester's Red Cross or the St John Fund. Most premises were lent free of rent and in some cases owners also met the costs of heating and lighting.

The first Oxfam charity shop in the United Kingdom was established by Cecil Jackson-Cole in Broad Street, Oxford, and began trading in December 1947.

In the UK the Charity Retail group noted that in 2025 there are over 10,000 shops in the UK (more than 3% of retail units); the shops generated £387million in profit in 2022 and had previously diverted 339,000 tonnes of textiles from waste in the space of one year.

== Popularity ==
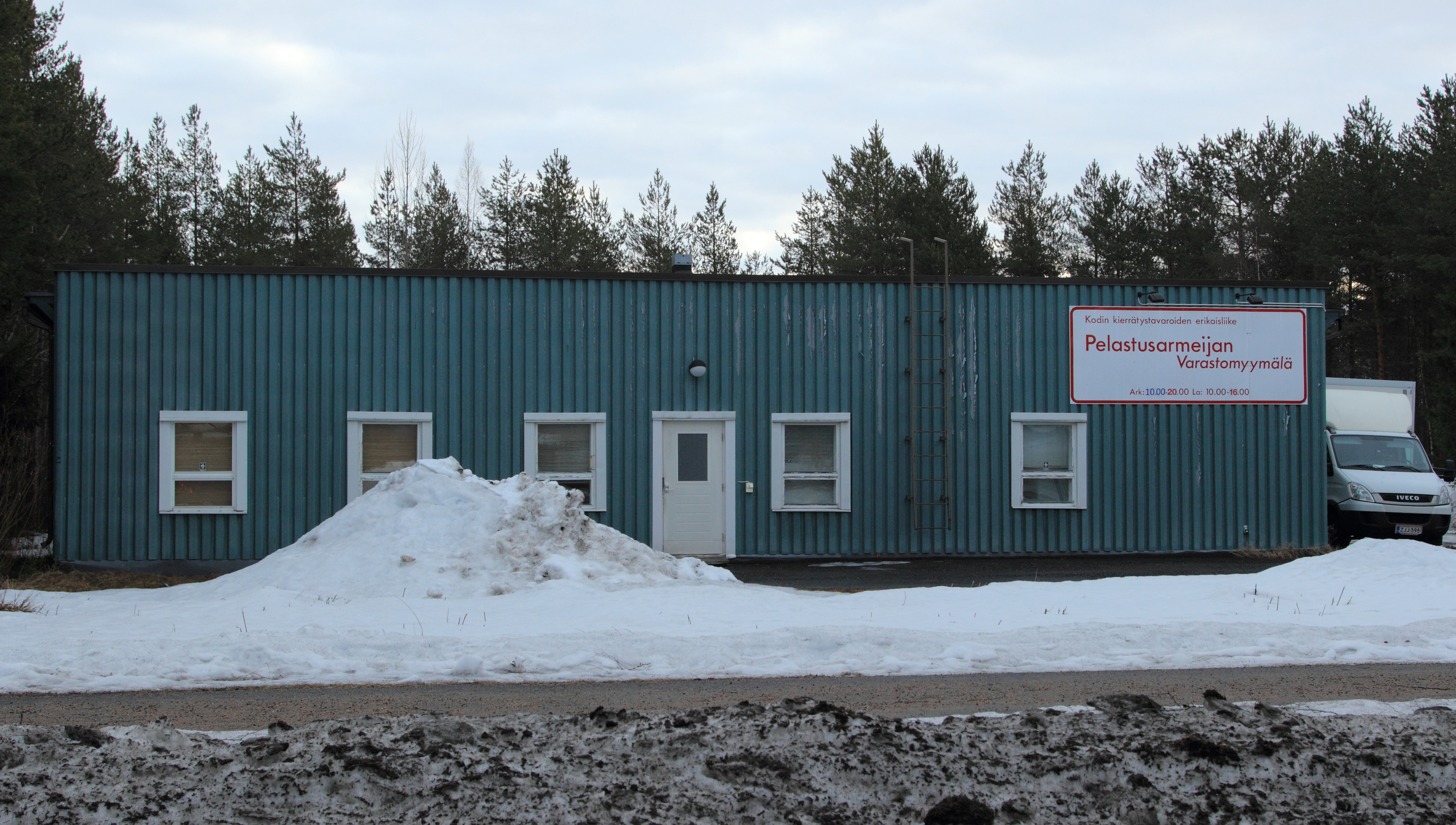
A charity/second-hand shop of the Salvation Army in Oulu, Finland.

In the early 2010s, shopping at a charity shop became popular enough to earn a name in the United States: thrifting. There are both internal and external factors contributing to a person's desire to thrift.

=== Intrinsic motivations to thrift ===
==== Sustainability ====
Environmentalists may prefer buying second-hand goods as this uses fewer natural resources and will usually do less damage to the environment than buying new goods would, in part because the goods are usually collected locally. In addition, reusing second-hand items is a form of recycling, and thus reduces the amount of waste going to landfill sites which is viewed as combatant to the effects of fast fashion. People who oppose sweatshops often purchase second-hand clothing as an alternative to supporting clothing companies with dubious ethical practices.

==== Fashion ====
People who desire authentic vintage clothing typically shop at charity shops because some specialize in selling donated clothing that is old and/or out of modern fashion (often from a recently deceased person who had owned such garments for many years). These items may be perceived as one-of-a-kind or especially unique. Many social media channels make thrifting videos showcasing fashionable and unusual finds.

=== Extrinsic motivations to thrift ===
==== Monetary ====
Charity shops tend to be relatively inexpensive, which has led to an increase in their popularity. During the United Kingdom cost of living crisis, a survey found that 53% of British young adults began thrifting as a budget-friendly alternative to purchasing new clothing items. Charity shops are also struggling in this economic crisis.

==== Health and safety ====
Consumers are less likely to purchase items if they feel they are unsanitary or dirty. However, second-hand goods are considered to be quite safe. The South Australian Public Health Directorate says that the health risk of buying used clothing is low. It explains that washing purchased items in hot water is just one of several ways to eliminate the risk of contracting infectious diseases.

==== Electronic word of mouth ====
Social media platforms help spread awareness and trust in the thrifting process. Online content creators who share their experiences, tips, and tricks about thrifting can influence their viewers to buy items from a charity or thrift shop. These influencers can also make the process more accessible by providing knowledge on where to thrift, why to thrift, and how to thrift correctly. Thrifting has become a popular trend amongst Generation Z with its increasing popularity on social media platforms like Instagram and TikTok.

==== Identity and aesthetic motivations ====
In more recent years, online thrifting has become a cultural phenomenon from younger consumers such as Generation Z, who view second hand shopping as an expression of individuality and values. Platforms such as Instagram, TikTok and Depop facilitate the merging of social networking, style curation and resale shopping, which allow users to show thrifted outfits, engage in ‘haul’ culture, and participate in fashion communities. Researchers have noted that second-hand fashion is linked to digital style curation and the performance of individuality, rather than solely to affordability or necessity.

Logo of online second-hand shop ThredUp.

=== Online second-hand shops ===
Online charity and thrift shops are digital marketplaces that host buying and selling of second-hand goods, such as clothing, accessories, or other items. These platforms typically act as intermediaries between independent buyers and sellers by providing spaces for users to upload unwanted items to be sold to other users. Companies such as eBay, ThredUp, Depop, Poshmark, and Vinted are examples of for-profit, exclusively online second-hand shops. Some non-profit brick-and-mortar charity shops host online spaces where users can both buy and donate items. Some examples of these are The Salvation Army and Oxfam. Additionally some thrift shops are run on social media platforms such as Instagram where sellers can post available items on their page and interested buyers may direct message to purchase the items.

Online charity and thrift stores have gained popularity in the 21st century with the rising concern of environmental sustainability. Online second-hand shopping saw a 23% rise from 2023 to 2024, marking the highest growth in the market of thrifting and charity shopping and leading to a projected $367 billion global market value in 2029.

One concern with the rise of online thrift stores is that they are causing a decline in the quality of items donated to conventional thrift stores. Items deemed higher-value may be sold on for-profit sites, while lower value items that might not sell will be relegated to physical thrift stores, which leaves those stores with a plethora of low quality or even broken items that must be trashed.

== Sale of new goods ==
Some charity shops, such as PDSA, also sell a range of new goods that may be branded to the charity or have some connection with the cause the charity supports. Oxfam stores, for example, sell fair trade food and crafts. Charity shops may receive overstock or obsolete goods from local for-profit businesses (e.g., electronics); the for-profit businesses benefit by taking a tax write-off and clearing unwanted goods from their store instead of throwing the goods out, which is costly. Some charity shops which provide clothing to homeless people who have government-issued vouchers have a few new items (underwear and socks), as these items are less suitable for resale when they are used.

== Charity shops by region ==
=== Australia ===
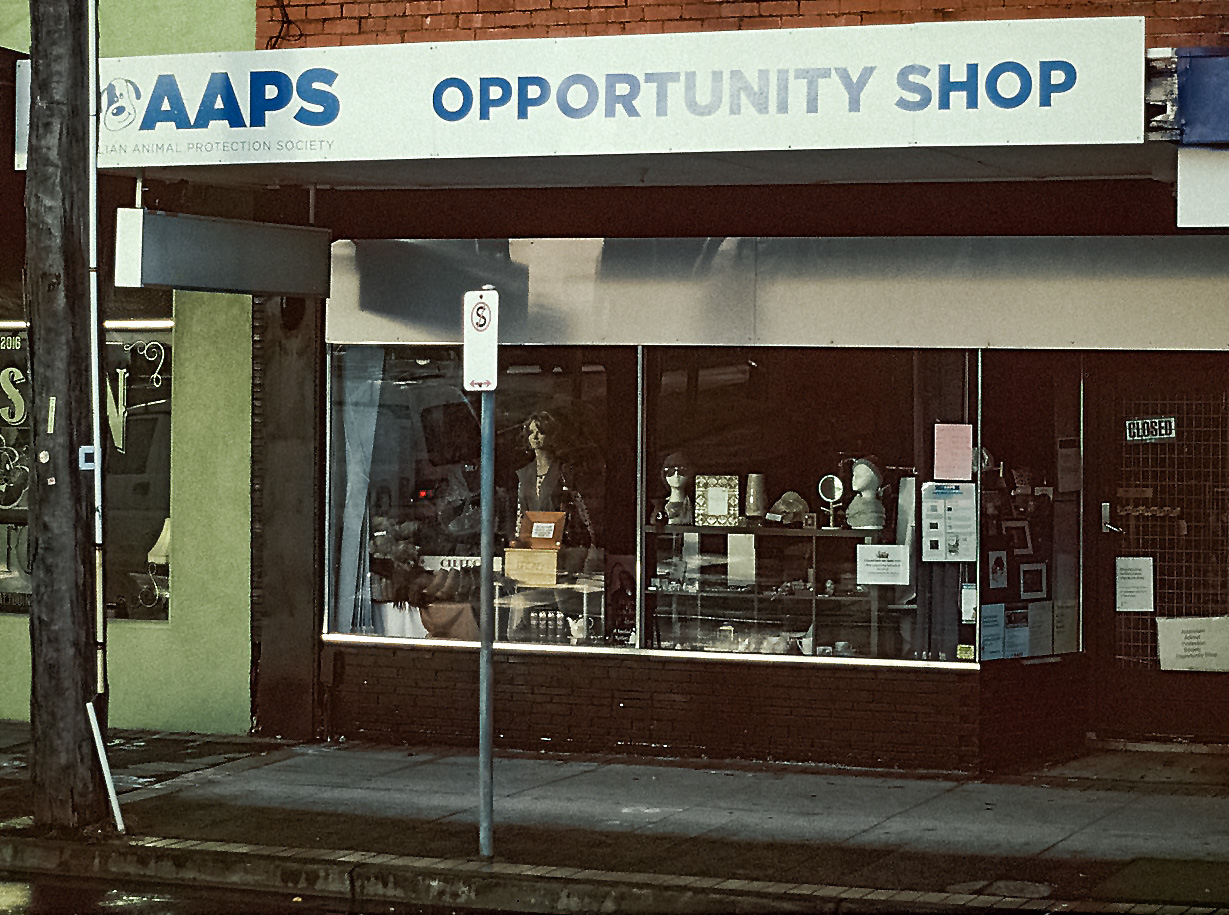
Charity shop in Victoria, Australia

The first "opportunity shop" in Australia was set up in Melbourne in 1925 by Lady Millie Tallis, the wife of a high profile member of the entertainment industry. While similar shops were already in place in the United Kingdom and United States, they were generally filled with poor quality items and stigmatised. In order to raise money for St Vincent's Hospital, she organised for the abandoned Fitzroy Cyclorama, to be transformed into an opportunity shop. More than 10,000 quality items were donated from manufacturers, shops and the public to raise funds. Over £2000 equivalent to $184,012 in 2022 was raised in 9 weeks of trading, with the hospital able to buy their first X-ray machine.

In Australia, major national opportunity shop chains include the St. Vincent de Paul Thrift Store (trading as Vinnies) which operate 650 shops across Australia, Anglicare Shops, that currently operate in 19 locations across Sydney and the Illawarra also various locations around Australia, the Salvation Army (trading as Salvos), the Red Cross, MS Research Australia, and the Brotherhood of St. Laurence. Many local charitable organisations, both religious and secular, run opportunity shops. Common among these are missions and animal shelters.

The first World Op Shop Day is due to be held on 18 October 2025.

=== Canada ===
Beginning in 1972, the first MCC Thrift Store opened in Altona, Manitoba. In 2025, the Mennonite Central Committee operates 85 thrift stores in Canada and United States.

In 2025, the Salvation Army and Habitat for Humanity each have over 100 shops in the country. Mission Thrift has more than 50 thrift stores across Canada.

=== Denmark ===
Most of the charity shops in Denmark are operated by either The Danish Red Cross or by Christian organizations. The Danish Red Cross has 250 shops in the country and 10,000 volunteers working in the shops. DanChurchAid has operated charity shops since 1972, and currently operates 114 shops. In 2025, the Blue Cross, founded as a Christian organization, runs over 50 charity shops in the country. It focuses mainly on helping alcoholics, addicts and other socially marginalized groups.

A study from 2019 shows that Danes on average had spent 5.475 kr. on second-hand items the last 12 months, and that 77% of Danes had either shopped or sold second-hand, although the study was not exclusive to charity shops.

Charity shops in Denmark, as of February 2022
Red Cross	Blue Cross	Folkekirkens nødhjælp (DanChurchAid)	Kirkens Korshær (The Church's Army)	Kræftens Bekæmpelse (The Fight of Cancer)
c. 250	55	114	240	15

=== Ireland ===
In 2025 there are 550 charity shops in Ireland. The majority of these are run by Saint Vincent de Paul (230 shops) and Vision Ireland (121 shops). Other charities include Oxfam (45 shops), Enable Ireland (30 shops) and the Irish Cancer Society (21 shops).

=== New Zealand ===
A large variety of charity shops exist throughout New Zealand. Some are secular and some belong to religious organisations. Charities include Opportunity for Animals, 3 shops; and Orphan's Aid, 7 shops.

In 2025 NZ charity shops include 125 Hospice shops, over 100 Salvation Army shops, 53 Red Cross shops, 23 for Habitat for Humanity and 22 for St John's Ambulance. At the same time, the SPCA has 90 shops in NZ and St Vincent de Paul (Vinnies) has over 60.

The term "op-shop" is often used to mean any second-hand shop regardless of its charitable status.

=== United Kingdom ===
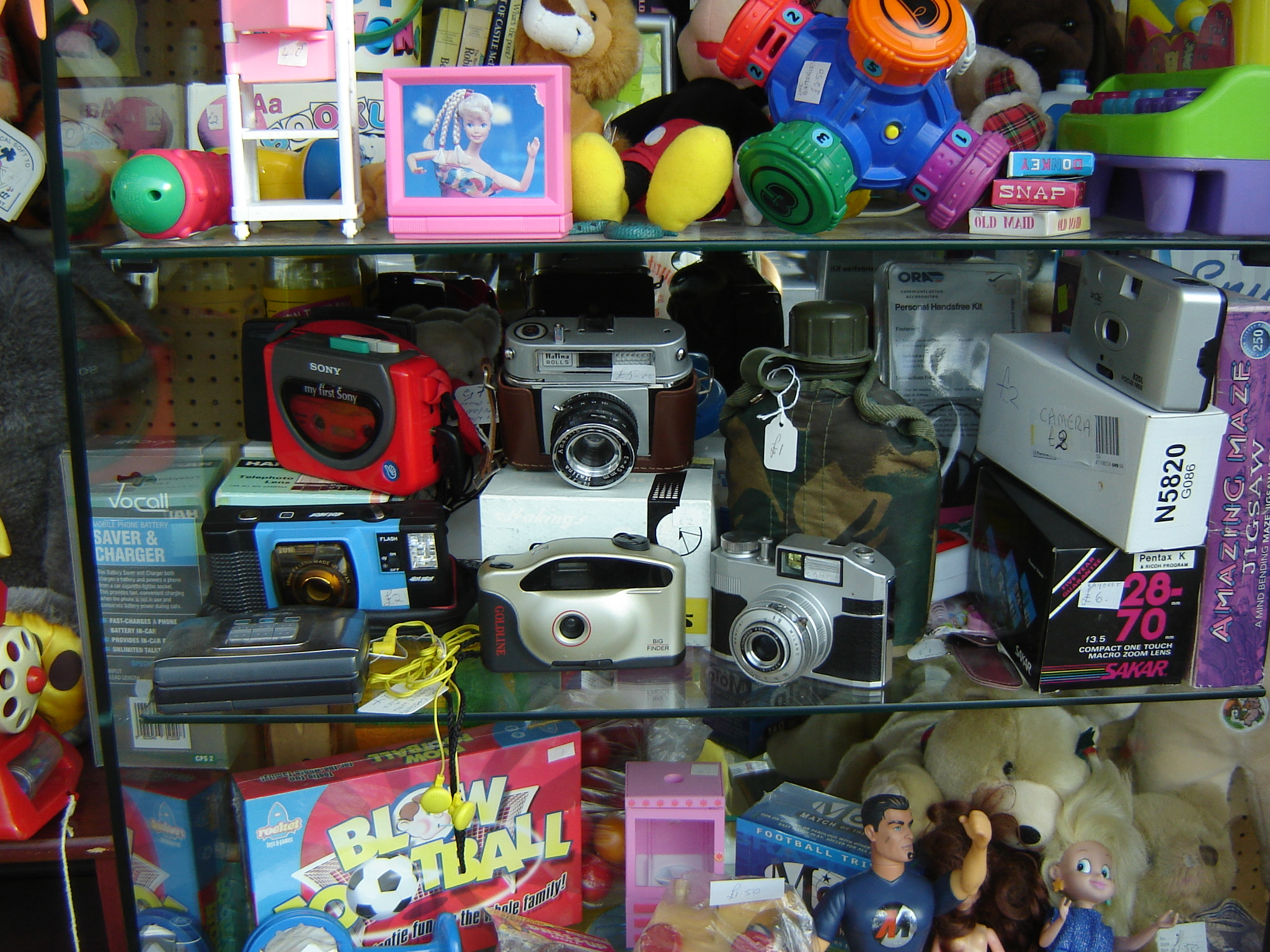
Window display in a UK charity shop.

Oxfam has the largest number of charity shops in the UK with over 600 shops. Many Oxfam shops also sell books, and the organization now operates over 70 specialist Oxfam Bookshops, making them the largest retailer of second-hand books in the United Kingdom. Other Oxfam affiliates also have shops, such as Jersey, Germany, Ireland (45 shops in NI/ROI), the Netherlands and Hong Kong. Other charities with a strong presence on high streets in the UK include The Children's Society, YMCA, British Heart Foundation, Barnardos, Cancer Research UK, Shelter, Roy Castle Lung Cancer Foundation, Age UK (formerly Age Concern and Help the Aged), Marie Curie Cancer Care, Norwood, Save the Children, Scope, PDSA, Naomi House Children's Hospice and Sue Ryder Care. Many local hospices also operate charity shops to raise funds.

There are over 9,000 charity shops in the UK and Republic of Ireland. Their locations can be found on the Charity Retail Association (CRA) website, along with information on charity retail, what shops can and can't accept, etc. The CRA is a member organisation for charities which run shops. British charity shops are mainly staffed by unpaid volunteers, with a paid shop manager. Goods for sale are predominantly from donations - 87% according to the official estimate. 'Standard' charity shops sell a mix of clothing, books, toys, videos, DVDs, music (like CDs, cassette tapes and vinyl) and bric-a-brac (like cutlery and ornaments). Some shops specialise in certain areas, like vintage clothing, furniture, electrical items, or records.

The two largest charity shops in the UK are run by Emmaus. An Emmaus Preston store opened in 2016 is on one level and covers 47,000 square feet and Emmaus in Rochdale operate a three floor Department Store since January 2019 which offers the department store feel to the charity store. These stores are run by Emmaus Companions and the money they generate directly benefits the people who work in it. Both stores sell predominantly furniture and white goods but include smaller concessions of clothes, bric-a-brac, books and music.

Almost all charity shops sell on their unsold textiles (i.e. unfashionable, stained or damaged fabric) to textile processors. Each charity shop saves an average of 40 tonnes of textiles every year, by selling them in the shop, or passing them on to these textile merchants for recycling or reuse. This grosses to around 363,000 tonnes across all charity shops in the UK; based on 2010 landfill tax value at £48 per tonne, the value of textiles reused or passed for recycling by charity shops in terms of savings in landfill tax is £17,424,000 p.a. Gift Aid is a UK tax incentive for individual donors where, subject to a signed declaration being held by the charity, income tax paid on donations can be reclaimed by the charity. Although initially intended only for cash donations, the scheme now (since 2006) allows tax on the income earned by charity shops acting as agent for the donor to be reclaimed.

Charity shops in the UK get mandatory 80% relief on business rates on their premises, which is funded by central government (not by local ratepayers) and is one illustration of their support for the charity sector and the role of charity shops in raising funds for charities. Charities can apply for discretionary relief on the remaining 20%, which is an occasional source of criticism from retailers which have to pay in full.

In 2026, some large charity retailers replotted large falls in profits, with Oxfam reporting that retail profit fell 23% and British Heart Foundation reporting a £3.3 million loss in the last financial year. The rise in popularity of online operators such as Vinted and Depop, and increased sales by Chinese companies in developing countries, were reported as partial causes in this decline.

==== Largest charity retailers ====
The Charity Shops Survey 2017 revealed the ten largest charity retailers in the UK based on annual income and number of stores.

Charity	Annual Income (£)	Number of Stores
British Heart Foundation	£176.4m	724
Oxfam GB	£92.5m	640
Cancer Research UK	£84.5m	594
Barnardo's	£70.3m	710
Sue Ryder	£55.0m	451
The Salvation Army	£48.0m	230
Age UK	£42.6m	404
British Red Cross	£30.0m	341
Scope	£21.3m	225
Marie Curie	£16.4m	178

=== United States ===
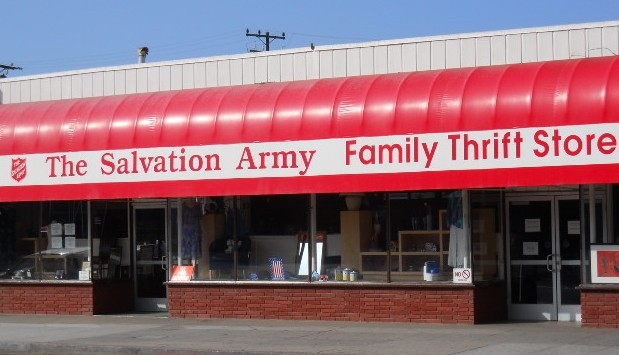
Salvation Army Thrift Store, Santa Monica, California USA

In the United States, major national thrift shop operators include Goodwill Industries, Salvation Army, St. Vincent de Paul Thrift Store, and ReStore (operated by Habitat for Humanity). Value Village/Savers, while looking like a thrift store and selling donated goods, is actually a private, for-profit company. Regional operators include Deseret Industries in the Western United States, and those run by AbleLight in the Upper Midwest. Many local charitable organizations, both religious and secular, operate thrift stores. Common among these are missions, children's homes, homeless shelters, and animal shelters. In addition, some thrift stores are operated by churches as fundraising venues that support activities and missionary work.

== See also ==
- Atomic Ed and the Black Hole, a documentary film about a unique secondhand shop
- Auto auction
- Car boot sale
- Consignment
- Fashionphile
- Flea market
- Freeganism
- Give-away shop
- Jumble sale
- Recommerce
- Regift
- Reseller
- Second-hand shop
- Surplus store
- Sustainable clothing
- The Market for Lemons, a book discussing a phenomenon that may make it difficult to maintain quality in markets for certain used goods, such as computers and cars.
- Used good
