= Whatnot =

American e-commerce company

- Industry: e-commerce
- Founded: 2019
- Founder: Grant LaFontaine (CEO), Logan Head
- Headquarters: Los Angeles, California, US
- Number of employees: ~800
- Website: www.whatnot.com

Whatnot is a digital marketplace and live-stream shopping platform where users can buy and sell items in online video auctions. The company was incorporated in Delaware but is based in Marina Del Rey, California. Whatnot's slogan is "Shop, Sell, Connect". It is the largest live shopping platform in the United States.

== History ==
Whatnot was founded in 2019 by Grant LaFontaine and Logan Head. Before expanding to host a more diverse range of products, the platform started as a marketplace for Funko Pop figurines.

In 2020, Whatnot began hosting live shows in which sellers would promote products and field questions from potential customers. This soon became an important part of the company's business model.

In 2024, Whatnot launched a rewards program in which sellers could create rewards for buyers to earn, such as coupons, free shipping, and access to exclusive shows and merchandise. That same year, sellers using Whatnot sold $3 billion worth of goods via live sales, mainly in collectible categories like trading cards and sports cards. Whatnot received $265 million in a Series E funding round that valued the company at $4.97 billion.

A Series F funding round conducted in October 2025 raised another $225 million and valued the company at $11.5 billion. This funding round was co-led by DST Global and CapitalG and included investments from Greycroft, Andreessen Horowitz, and Sequoia Capital. In June 2025, Whatnot ranked inside the top 15 most popular free iPhone apps in the United States, and No. 1 in the shopping category overall. That year, the platform added spending limits, had more than $8 billion in sales, and held nearly 60% market share of live commerce across North America and Europe. The company reported that over 20 million new accounts were created in 2025 and that "Sports" and "TCG cards" were the top two best-selling categories in the U.S. that year.

In February 2026, following changes at the United States Postal Service (USPS) that risked delaying package acceptance scans, Whatnot introduced new in-app scanning tools.

In March 2026, it was announced that Whatnot had integrated with Shopify, which allows users to automatically sync their inventories and orders across platforms.

Whatnot had begun selling shelf-stable food items, like candy and snacks, in the summer of 2025. By April 2026, it introduced a "fresh food" category, which included foods like fish and steak. Between July 2025 and January 2026, Whatnot’s food category had increased 30% month-over-month.

In April 2026, Whatnot was included on the TIME100 Most Influential Companies of 2026 list.

In September 2026, Whatnot announced updated commission rates, introducing a financial structure in which commission rates would be lowered for vendors who hit specific thresholds for monthly sales (starting at $15,000). Also in September, a partnership between secondhand online retailer ThredUp and Whatnot was announced, with Whatnot hosting ThreadUp's first live shows from its distribution centers in Atlanta, Georgia and Dallas, Texas.

In October 2026, it was announced that record label Mass Appeal and Whatnot would collaborate on a "shopping mall-inspired" Whatnot Liveplex to house hip-hop collectibles for the New York City Comic Con.

== Operations ==
Whatnot functions as a remote-first company with co-located hubs in the U.S., the United Kingdom, Ireland, Poland, and Germany. The platform uses live-streamed auctions. Whatnot generates revenue through fees charged to sellers and collaborations with influencers and brands to promote products on the platform.

== Features ==
=== Livestream auctions ===
Whatnot is a livestream shopping marketplace where sellers display products during live broadcasts and buyers can purchase products in real-time by bidding. This allows sellers to quickly move product and inventory. The platform utilizes a silent auction style for buyers to submit a bid before the timer expires.

=== Product categories ===
The Whatnot platform primarily focused on collectibles such as trading cards, comics, figurines, and memorabilia. Next, the platform expanded its online marketplace with expansion into the beauty, fashion, and electronics. In September 2026, The Boston Globe reported that a seafood merchant located in Maine used Whatnot to grow his business, by live-streaming and auctioning his fresh caught lobsters for buyers throughout the United States.

=== Seller tools and rewards ===
In October 2024, Whatnot created and pushed forward their Rewards Club, which is a gamified loyalty program, which allows sellers to promote purchases and bids on their products, while offering benefits like free shipping, coupons, and exclusive perks. The platform categorizes its buyers by status levels, such as Bronze, Silver, Gold, Platinum, and Diamond which are distinguished by money and time spent on the platform.

=== Shopify integration ===
In April 2026, Whatnot integrated Shopify onto its platform, allowing sellers to synchronize product listings, pricing, inventory, and orders among different platforms, even conducting livestream auctions. After an auction sale occurs on Whatnot, the information is transferred to Shopify, where the seller can then manage the fulfillment and shipping of orders.

=== Seller commission structure ===
Sellers' commissions are based on completed transactions and calculated by the selling price of the item, instead of the total amount paid by the buyer.In September 2026, the company introduced a new commission structure, where sellers qualify for reduced commission rates based on their volume of sales and product category they're auctioning over a four week period. Whatnot offered commission rates as low as 3% to its high volume sellers. There are still separate standard payment processing fees that are connected to every transaction.

== Controversies ==
Whatnot has faced criticism over its lack of oversight of its sellers and gambling-like mechanics on its platform. Critics argue that certain features of the platform “meet the legal definition of gambling”. They allege that the platform's design pressures users to spend money quickly without spending-limits. This includes sellers holding auctions for mystery boxes. Mystery boxes involve customers bidding on items without knowledge of its content or value before purchasing.

By March 2026, Whatnot faced 15 arbitration claims; customers accused the company of conducting an unlawful gambling scheme in violation of the Racketeer Influenced and Corrupt Organizations (RICO) Act. They also allege that by allowing sellers to hold randomized box and repack breaks on its platform, the company violated sweepstakes and consumer lottery laws. In a statement to The Athletic, Whatnot rejected the characterization of these complaints, stating that gambling was not allowed on its platform and "while sellers who 'break' only make up 4% of sellers on our platform, we've taken care to bring that experience online in a way that holds everyone accountable."

Separately, customer reviews have reported instances of fraud on the platform, including sellers who lock out buyers after they’ve paid for an item. Whatnot has responded to these claims, saying they have taken steps to fight back against fraud and added tools to control over-spending.

In August 2023, Blakesbreaks', a company run by former NFL player Blake Martinez, was permanently removed from the site after Whatnot concluded an internal investigation. Prior to the investigation, Blakesbreaks' faced multiple accusations of scamming techniques including “theft from customer orders, sleight of hand, and trading card pack manipulation.” Whatnot claimed to remove "the individual employees involved in the misconduct” and have "refunded all buyers impacted by the infractions.”

Some Whatnot resellers buy popular products in bulk and resell them at substantial markups. These practices have been labeled as exploitative by consumers. Whatnot defends such practices, stating that the reselling of products is a longstanding practice on many platforms.
