= Skivvy =

Skivvy may refer to:

- Undergarments (primarily in the United States)
- The upper body clothing also known as a polo neck or turtle neck
- Maid, servant, or person at the bottom of the social order (primarily in Britain)
