= W. A. Strain Farm–Strain House =

Historic house in Texas, United States

- U.S. National Register of Historic Places
- U.S. Historic district
- Texas State Antiquities Landmarks
- Recorded Texas Historic Landmark
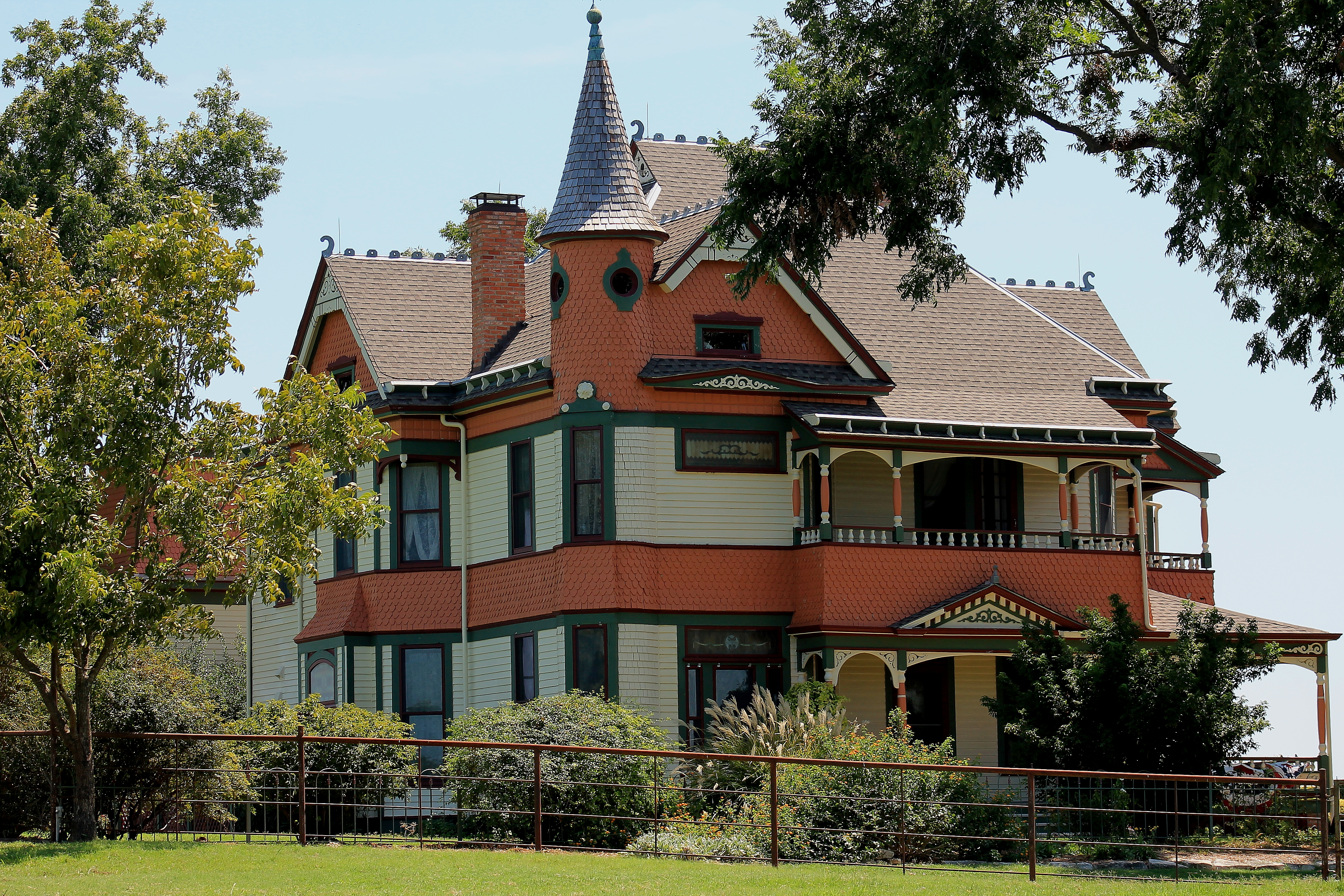
- W. A. Strain House in 2012

- Location within Texas Location within the United States
- Interactive map showing the location for Strain House
- Location: 400 E. Pecan St., 400 S. Lancaster-Hutchins Rd., Lancaster, Texas
- Coordinates: 32°35′16″N 96°44′58″W
- Area: 2 acres (0.81 ha) (original); 163 acres (66 ha) (increase)
- Built: 1896; 130 years ago
- Built by: Joe Lyon
- Architect: J.E. Flanders & Moad
- Architectural style: Late Victorian
- NRHP reference No.: 78002922 (original); 01001002 (increase)
- TSAL No.: 8200002415, 8200002416, 8200002417, 8200002418, 8200002419, 8200002420, 8200002421, 8200002422
- RTHL No.: 6891

Significant dates
- Added to NRHP: November 29, 1978
- Boundary increase: September 17, 2001
- Designated TSAL: February 4, 2004
- Designated RTHL: 1977

The W. A. Strain Farm–Strain House is a farmstead located in Lancaster, Texas, United States. It was listed on the National Register of Historic Places as the W. A. Strain House in 1978. A boundary increase in 2001 expanded the area covered from 2 acres to 163 acres and the property listing name was changed to W. A. Strain Farm–Strain House.

The Strain House is an example of late Victorian architecture. It was designed by J. E. Flanders & Moad of Dallas. This firm also designed the Trinity Methodist Church in Dallas, and the Shackelford County Courthouse, which is part of an historic district in Albany, Texas. Joe Lyon built the house in 1896. The 2 1/2-story frame structure includes a gabled wood-shingle roof, and the brick foundation has an asymmetrical plan.

The Strain Farm is believed to be the oldest working farm in Dallas County and is one of a small number of farms owned and operated for more than 100 years by a single family. The heirs of W. A. Strain have continued to live in the old family home, maintaining it with very few alterations and much of the original furnishings still intact.

== See also ==
- National Register of Historic Places listings in Dallas County, Texas
- Recorded Texas Historic Landmarks in Dallas County
