= Millie Tallis =

Australian philanthropist

Lady Millie Tallis
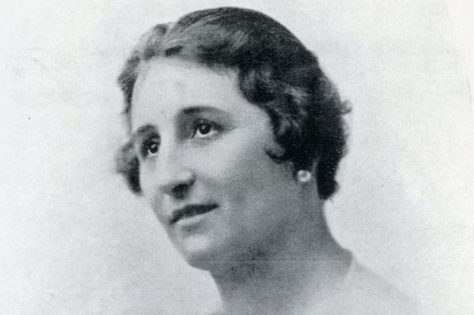
- Born: 1 November 1874; Collingwood, Melbourne, Victoria
- Died: 9 August 1933 (aged 58); Mornington, Victoria
- Burial place: Box Hill Cemetery
- Occupation: actress
- Known for: developing the op shop concept in Australia in the 1920's
- Spouse: Sir George Tallis (m. 1988)
- Family: Florence Maude Young (sister)

Amelia Hannah Tallis, Lady Tallis (née Young; 1 November 1874 – 9 August 1933) was an Australian actress and philanthropist.

She is best known for adopting and developing the "op shop" concept in Australia. The term "op shop" is attributed to Tallis.

== Early life ==
Young was born in the Melbourne suburb of Collingwood. Born to Henry Henrard Young and his wife Elizabeth (née Tonkin), she was a younger sister to Florence Maude Young.

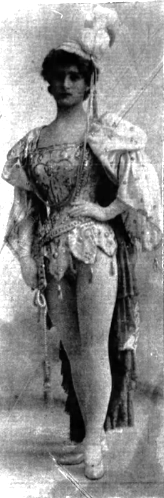
Millie Young as Robin Hood in "Babes in the Wood" (1898)

In her youth, Tallis was active in Melbourne's theatre community and had roles in numerous stage productions, predominantly those in the burlesque and comic opera genre. Among her credits were productions of Matsa: Queen of Fire, La Grande Duchesse, The Sign of the Cross, and Djin-Djin, Djin-Djin.

She also played Robin Hood in Babes in the Wood alongside Ada Reeve who played Maid Marian.

== Philanthropy ==
Upon her marriage in 1898, Tallis retired from acting and instead concentrated on her philanthropic work which is what she became best known for.

In 1925, she helped raise funds for Melbourne's St Vincent's Hospital in the suburb of Fitzroy by setting up a pop-up store to sell used goods. Although based on the thrift shop or goodwill store concept, Tallis considered that those types of stores were stigmatised as for being exclusively for poor people, and stocking inferior goods.

Therefore, Tallis established an "opportunity shop" at an abandoned cyclorama building which was officially opened by the acting mayoress of Fitzroy on 19 November 1925.

With over 10,000 items for offer, Tallis ensure the goods she acquired were of high quality with products including from artworks, furniture, books, bedding, kitchenware, gardening utensils as well as fresh produce.

The store raised £300 in the first three hours of it being open and after nine weeks of trade, raised more than £2000 for the hospital which was used to purchase new beds and X-ray equipment.

For her philanthropy, Tallis later became a life governor of the hospital.

== Personal life and death ==
In a small ceremony on 8 September 1898 at St Peter's Anglican Church in Melbourne, Millie Young married theatrical entrepreneur George Tallis who was best known for his association with J. C. Williamson's theatre company.

Tallis died at her Mornington home on 9 August 1933 at the age of 58. She was buried at Box Hill Cemetery.

Her husband died 15 years later.
