= Hutchins State Jail =

Prison in Dallas, Texas

- Interactive map of Hutchins State Jail
- Location: 1500 East Langdon Road Hutchins, Dallas County, Texas; 32°39′39″N 96°42′54″W
- Status: Operational
- Security class: mixed
- Capacity: 2,280
- Opened: 1995
- Managed by: Texas Department of Criminal Justice

The Hutchins State Jail is a state prison located in Hutchins, Dallas County, Texas. It is a part of the Texas Department of Criminal Justice. The state jail serves mixed security levels, with an official capacity of 2,280.

== History ==
On July 22, 2011, an inmate collapsed and died after only three days in the facility. His death was attributed to the hot environment of the prison; his body temperature was over 109°F when admitted to the hospital. His family filed a wrongful-death suit against the state, citing nine examples of Texas state inmates dying of heat-related causes in 2011 alone. Larry McCollum, the individual who died, had a 12-month sentence for check fraud. Hutchins Unit still has no air conditioning in the 9 standard housing units.
