= Hutchins, Texas =

- City
- Location of Hutchins in Dallas County, Texas
- Coordinates: 32°38′38″N 96°42′27″W
- Country: United States
- State: Texas
- County: Dallas

Government
  - Mayor: Mario Vasquez

Area
  - Total: 9.31 sq mi (24.11 km^{2})
  - Land: 9.09 sq mi (23.54 km^{2})
  - Water: 0.22 sq mi (0.57 km^{2}) 2.35%
- Elevation: 466 ft (142 m)

Population (2020)
  - Total: 5,607
  - Density: 616.9/sq mi (238.2/km^{2})
- Time zone: UTC-6 (CST)
  - Summer (DST): UTC-5 (CDT)
- ZIP code: 75141
- Area codes: 214, 469, 945, 972
- FIPS code: 48-35612
- GNIS feature ID: 1338331
- Website: https://www.cityofhutchinstx.gov/

Hutchins is a city in Dallas County, Texas, United States. Its population was 5,607 at the 2020 census.

== History ==
The area was first inhabited by families around 1860 as a trading place for immigrants who settled along the west bank of the Trinity River and new arrivals who crossed the Trinity at Dowd's Ferry from the east.

The town received its name from railroad developer William J. Hutchins, who was then president and general manager of the Houston and Texas Central Railroad. The railway was completed through Hutchins in 1872. That same year, a post office opened in the community. The population of Hutchins grew to around 250 residents in 1884 and topped 300 by 1890. That figure declined slightly to 204 in 1904, but had risen to 500 in 1926.

Hutchins was officially incorporated in 1945. In the first census conducted after incorporation in 1950, the population stood at 743. Despite the rapid growth of Dallas County and most of its suburban communities during the latter half of the 20th century, Hutchins has grown at a much slower pace, and today, it is one of the smallest municipalities in the county. As of 2000, the city of Hutchins had 133 businesses and a population of 2,805. Many of the businesses in the city are industrial or manufacturing related. A number of its residents are employed in the city of Dallas.

== Geography ==
Hutchins is located at 32°38′38″N 96°42′27″W (32.643784, –96.707538), about 9 miles (14 km) south of downtown Dallas. It is bordered by Dallas on the north and northwest, Lancaster on the southwest, Wilmer to the south, and the Trinity River to the east. Interstate Highways 20 and 45 pass through the city.

According to the United States Census Bureau, the city has a total area of 9.3 square miles (24.1 km^{2}), of which 0.23 sq mi (0.6 km^{2}), or 2.35%, is covered by water.

Thomas Korosec of the Dallas Observer wrote that the main street of Hutchins had "a faded, smalltown feel" due to the shops along it.

== Demographics ==
Historical population
Census	Pop.	Note	%±
1880	116		—
1950	743		—
1960	1,100		48.0%
1970	1,755		59.5%
1980	2,996		70.7%
1990	2,719		−9.2%
2000	2,805		3.2%
2010	5,338		90.3%
2020	5,607		5.0%
U.S. Decennial Census

=== 2020 census ===
As of the 2020 census, Hutchins had a population of 5,607, with a median age of 30.9 years; 30.1% of residents under 18 and 7.7% were 65 or older. For every 100 females, there were 111.3 males, and for every 100 females 18 and over, there were 114.2 males 18 and over.

About 90.1% of the residents lived in urban areas, while 9.9% lived in rural areas. Of the 1,598 households, 51.4% had children under 18; 38.0% were married-couple households, 16.3% were households with a male householder and no spouse or partner present, and 37.1% were households with a female householder and no spouse or partner present. About 17.0% of all households were made up of individuals, and 5.6% had someone living alone who was 65 or older.

Of the 1,664 housing units, 4.0% were vacant. The homeowner vacancy rate was 0.8% and the rental vacancy rate was 4.8%.

Racial composition as of the 2020 census
Race	Number	Percent
White	1,252	22.3%
Black or African American	2,180	38.9%
American Indian and Alaska Native	81	1.4%
Asian	18	0.3%
Native Hawaiian and other Pacific Islander	1	0.0%
Some other race	1,298	23.1%
Two or more races	777	13.9%
Hispanic or Latino (of any race)	2,550	45.5%

== Government and infrastructure ==
The Texas Department of Criminal Justice operates the Hutchins State Jail for men in Hutchins.

== Education ==
=== Primary and secondary schools ===
Most of Hutchins is within the Dallas Independent School District (DISD). As of fall 2011, the area is zoned to Wilmer-Hutchins Elementary School, Kennedy-Curry Middle School, and Wilmer-Hutchins High School.

A portion of Hutchins is within Lancaster Independent School District. The zoned high school of that section is Lancaster High School.

==== School histories ====
Most of Hutchins was served by the Wilmer-Hutchins Independent School District (WHISD).

Until the end of the school district, C.S. Winn Elementary School was located in Hutchins. The Hutchins Academic Elementary School was also located in Hutchins. In 2004, the WHISD board voted to close Hutchins Academic, which had 82 students at the time. the former students moved to C.S. Winn and Wilmer Elementary School in Wilmer in January 2005. In addition the Hutchins 5th Grade Center opened in 2000. In addition, Kennedy-Curry Middle School and Wilmer-Hutchins High School in Dallas, then under WHISD control, served Wilmer.

The DISD took over all of WHISD for the 2005–2006 school year. WHISD closed shortly afterwards, with official termination in spring 2006. After the closure of WHISD, property values in the district increased. For the 2005–2006 school year until the 2010–2011 school year, the WHISD portion of Hutchins was served by several schools located in Dallas. The final 12th-grade class of WHISD attended South Oak Cliff High School. Other than that class, zoned high schools with sections of Hutchins included A. Maceo Smith and David W. Carter High Schools.

The DISD considered opening a new Wilmer-Hutchins Elementary School building, restoring the Wilmer-Hutchins High School building, and demolishing the Kennedy-Curry Middle School building as part of its 2008 bond campaign. The Wilmer Hutchins Elementary School was to open in an area of the City of Dallas in 2011. In November 2010, DISD announced that three schools (Wilmer Hutchins ES, Kennedy-Curry Middle School, and Wilmer-Hutchins HS) would open/reopen in the Wilmer-Hutchins area in 2011.

=== Public libraries ===
The Atwell Public Library serves Hutchins.

=== Colleges and universities ===
Dallas County residents are zoned to Dallas College (formerly Dallas County Community College or DCCC).

== Miscellaneous ==
Union Pacific's Dallas Intermodal Terminal is located partly in the city of Hutchins and partly in the city of Wilmer.
