= Florence Maude Young =

Florence Young
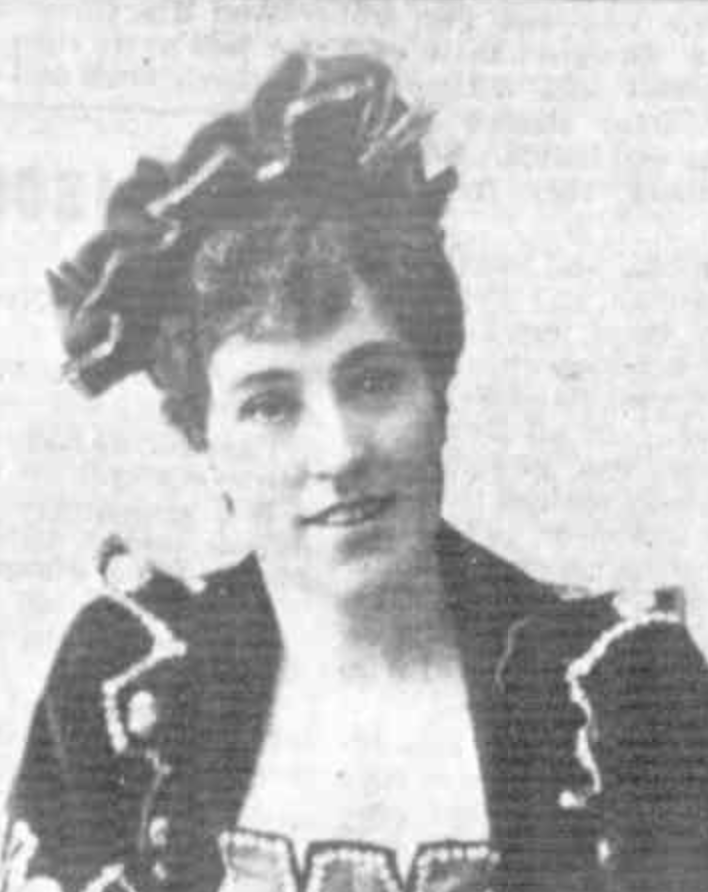

Background information
- Born: Florence Maude Young; 2 October 1870; Melbourne, Victoria
- Died: 11 November 1920 (aged 50) East Melbourne, Victoria
- Genres: opera and comic opera
- Occupation: soprano
- Years active: 1890–1920

Florence Maude Young (2 October 1870 – 11 November 1920) was an Australian actor and singer.

Young was born in Melbourne, Victoria to Henry Henrard Young and his wife Elizabeth (née Tonkin). She was an older sister to Millie who was also an actress in her early years but later became known for her philanthropy.

Young made her stage debut as Beatrice in von Suppé's three-act operetta, Boccaccio for the Nellie Stewart Opera Company in Melbourne in June 1890. She was reported to have filled the part "very efficiently", her singing was "highly commendable" and of "her acting she has apparently not much to learn".

She was a skilled vocalist, noted for her clear diction in pantomime, musical comedy, comic opera as well as grand opera.

On 8 February 1897 Young married Robert Campbell Rivington of London at St Peter's Church, Eastern Hill, Melbourne. The marriage failed as Young preferred life on the Melbourne stage to that at Phillip Island where her husband was a grazier. He petitioned successfully for divorce on grounds of desertion in 1912. The case was uncontested.

Young died at Somerset House Private Hospital in East Melbourne. She was buried in the Melbourne General Cemetery after a service at St Peter's Church, Eastern Hill, Melbourne.

== See also ==
- Eleanor Towzey (Nellie) Stewart
- James Cassius Williamson
- George Musgrove
