= Randlett (surname) =

Randlett is an English surname. Notable people with the surname include:

- James E. Randlett (1846–1909), American architect
- Mary Randlett (1924–2019), American photographer
- Samuel Randlett (1930–2023), American origami artist
