= Randlett House =

Historic house in Texas, United States

- U.S. National Register of Historic Places
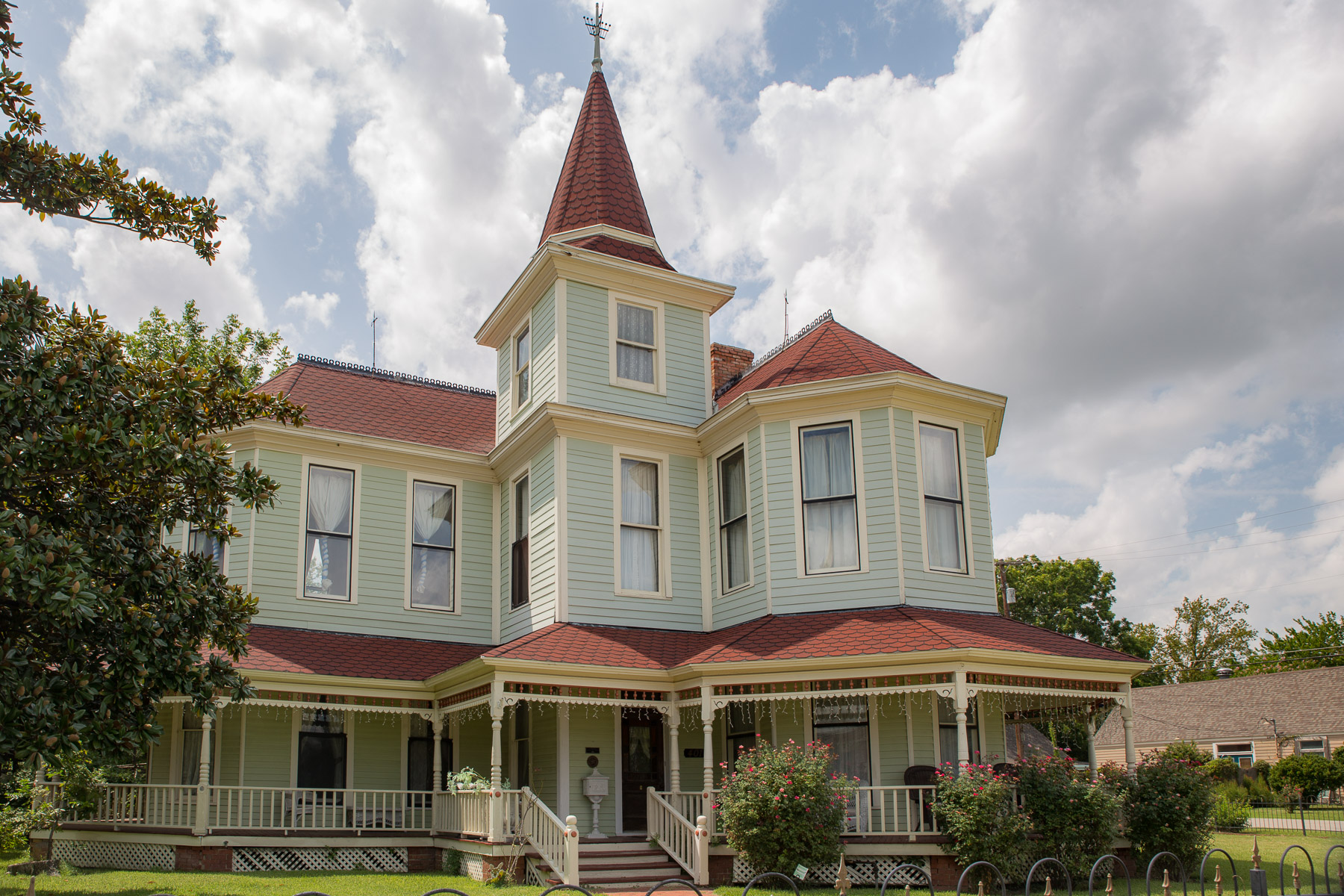
- Randlett House in 2012

- Location within Texas Location within the United States
- Interactive map showing the location of Randlett House
- Location: 401 S. Centre St., Lancaster, Texas
- Coordinates: 32°35′26″N 96°45′20″W
- Area: less than one acre
- Built: 1896
- Built by: S.D. Andrews
- Architectural style: Queen Anne
- NRHP reference No.: 78002920
- Added to NRHP: August 11, 1978

The Randlett House is located in Lancaster, Texas, United States. It was added to the National Register of Historic Places on August 11, 1978.

Constructed by S.D. Andrews for Sam Randlett, a prominent local merchant, the house was completed in 1896 and represented the Randlett's social status within the community. Displaying characteristics of Victorian architecture, the Randlett house possesses an asymmetrical floor plan, numerous projecting wings, a complicated roof line and detailed woodwork.

== See also ==
- National Register of Historic Places listings in Dallas County, Texas
