= Lancaster, Texas =

- City
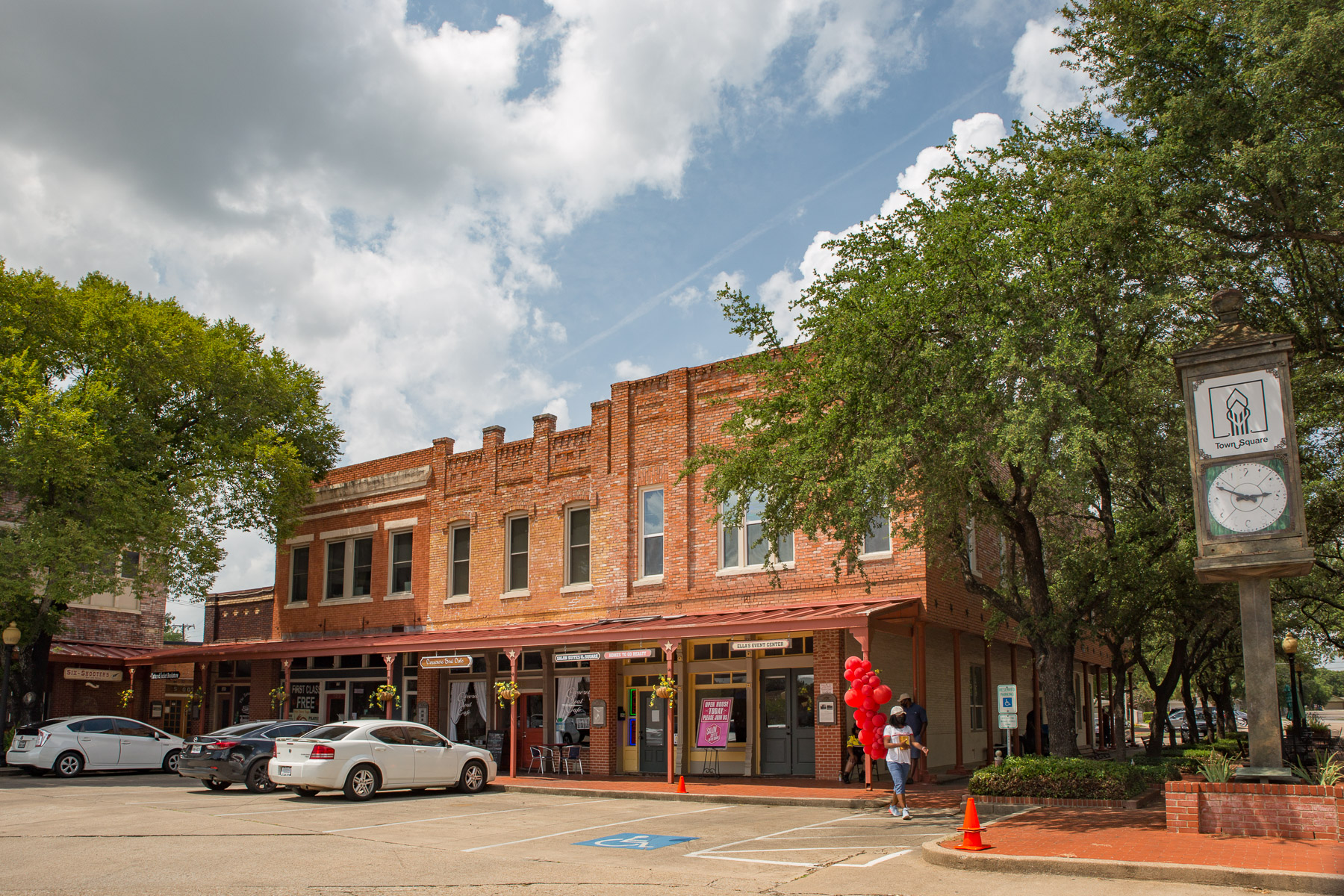
- Lancaster's Historic Town Square

- Flag
- Nickname: The City of Trees
- Location of Lancaster in Dallas County, Texas
- Coordinates: 32°36′8″N 96°46′30″W
- Country: United States
- State: Texas
- County: Dallas

Government
  - Type: Council-Manager
  - City Council: Mayor Clyde C. Hairston; Carol Strain-Burk; Stanley Jaglowski; Marco Mejia; Derrick D. Robinson; Mitchell Cheatham; Betty Gooden-Davis
  - City Manager: Opal Mauldin Robertson

Area
  - Total: 33.12 sq mi (85.77 km^{2})
  - Land: 33.06 sq mi (85.63 km^{2})
  - Water: 0.054 sq mi (0.14 km^{2})
- Elevation: 522 ft (159 m)

Population (2020)
  - Total: 41,275
  - Estimate (2023): 40,215
  - Density: 1,186/sq mi (458.1/km^{2})
- Time zone: UTC−6 (Central)
  - Summer (DST): UTC−5 (Central)
- ZIP Codes: 75134, 75146
- Area codes: 214, 469, 945, 972
- FIPS code: 48-41212
- GNIS feature ID: 1339599
- Website: Lancaster-TX.com

Lancaster (/ˈlæŋkɪstər/ LANK-is-tər) is a city in Dallas County, Texas, United States. Its population was 41,275 according to the 2020 census. Founded in 1852 as a frontier post, Lancaster is one of Dallas County's earliest settlements. Today, it is a suburban community located in the Dallas–Fort Worth metroplex, about 15 mi (24 km) south of downtown Dallas.

Lancaster is part of the Best Southwest area, which includes Lancaster, Cedar Hill, DeSoto, and Duncanville.

== History ==
=== Early settlement ===
In 1841, an act of the Republic of Texas Congress authorized President Mirabeau Lamar to enter into a contract with William S. Peters and 19 associates to promote settlement in North Texas, and paid the company with free land in exchange for recruiting new settlers. Around 600 families settled in what became known as Peters Colony from 1841 through 1844. The Peters' group advertised heavily in Kentucky, Illinois, Missouri, and Tennessee, so many of the earliest settlers were from those states. The first group to settle in the Lancaster area was Roderick Rawlins and his family from Greene County, Illinois. They left for Texas in September 1844. Rawlins and two of his sons-in-law came ahead to select the general area where they would settle. They chose an uninhabited area south of Dallas along the north bank of Ten Mile Creek as the site of their new settlement. In December 1844, the three men went back to Lamar County near the Red River to bring the rest of their wagon train. All of the settlers had arrived by January 2, 1845, and they formed a community known as Hardscrabble. It consisted of two rows of log cabins with a street running north and south. In total, 30 men, women, and children lived in Hardscrabble.

Several miles north of Hardscrabble, a second community called Pleasant Run was established in 1846 by Polly Rawlins, one of Roderick's daughters, and her husband Madison Moultrie "M.M." Miller. Together, the Millers built a two-room structure, with one room used as a general store and the other for living. By 1848, the structure had grown to 15 rooms, a separate store, and a warehouse. A post office was established with biweekly mail delivery and Miller as postmaster. By 1850, he had laid out a town and sold lots, but never filed a plat of the community with Dallas County. At its peak, Pleasant Run boasted a stage stop, school, and steam-powered grist mill in addition to Miller's store. Accelerated by the death of M.M. Miller in 1860, Pleasant Run declined. Shortly after the Rawlins' settlers abandoned the Hardscrabble settlement, Lancaster became the dominant community in the area.

=== Founding of Lancaster ===
The founder of Lancaster was "A" Bledsoe (Some sources list his name as Abram Bledsoe. or Albert A. Bledsoe). He was born in Lancaster, Kentucky, in 1801. According to family lore, when his father Moses first looked at his newborn son, he is said to have remarked, "he looks like a Bledsoe." Thus his name, A Bledsoe, is unmarked by a period.

Bledsoe surveyed and staked off the original town of Lancaster in 1852. He purchased 430 acres of land from the widow of Roderick Rawlins, and modeled it after his Kentucky hometown. The layout featured a town square with streets entering from the center of each side rather than from the corners. Bledsoe began selling lots at a public auction in 1853, reportedly giving as many as two-thirds of them to settlers from the nearby Pleasant Run community. The official plat of the town of Lancaster was not filed with Dallas County until 1857. Bledsoe later served as Dallas County judge and state comptroller. He died in 1882.

In 1860, a post office was established in Lancaster.

=== Progress and challenges ===
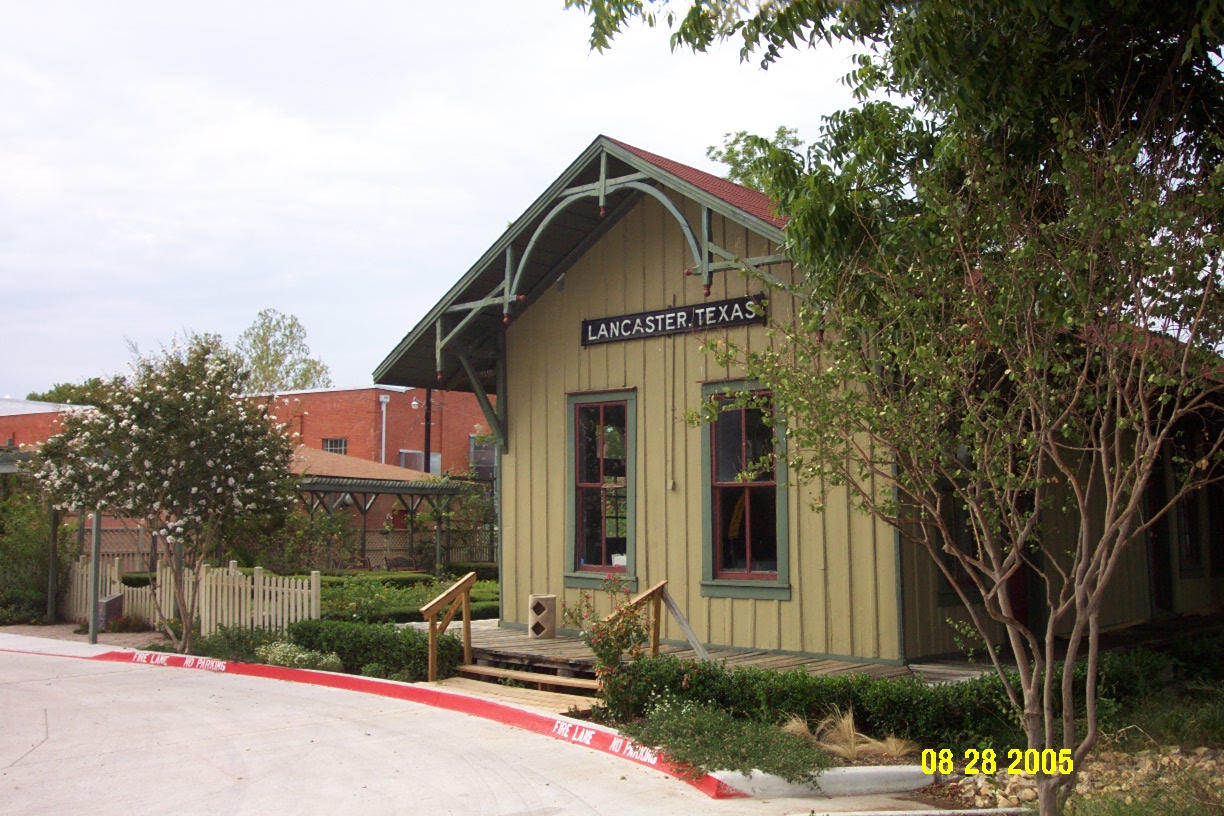
Lancaster's Historic MKT Depot and Rose Garden

During the American Civil War, the Tucker, Sherrod, and Company contracted with the State of Texas to manufacture replicas of the .44 caliber Colt Dragoon from a factory on West Main Street in Lancaster. John M. Crockett, former mayor of Dallas and lieutenant governor of Texas, served as superintendent of the arms factory. In the early years of Reconstruction, a drought crippled the economy to such an extent that few residents could afford more than the most basic of necessities. The economy did not fully recover until well into the 1870s, due in large part to the town's proximity to heavily trafficked cattle trails. The first public well was dug in the city's town square in 1876. Fires destroyed parts of the square in 1877, 1889, and again in 1918, each time being promptly rebuilt. Local telephone service came to Lancaster in 1881. Lancaster was incorporated on May 5, 1886. One year later, the Lancaster Herald newspaper began printing.

In December 1888, Lancaster's train depot opened as a stop on the Dallas and Waco Railway. In 1891, it became part of the Missouri–Kansas–Texas Railroad (MKT) line, running from Dallas to the Gulf Coast of Texas. The Lancaster Tap Railroad, completed in 1890, connected the MKT line in Lancaster with the Dallas-Houston line of the Houston and Texas Central Railway (H&TC) in Hutchins, 4.5 miles away. It operated for 44 years. Rene Paul "R.P." Henry opened the first official bank in 1889. By 1897, the town had a public school, Masonic Temple, a chapter of the International Order of Odd Fellows, and a variety of Christian churches. From 1898 to 1901, Texas Christian University founder Randolph Clark established Randolph College in Lancaster. After its closure, the facilities were used continuously until they burned in a 1912 fire.

=== Early 20th century ===
At the start of the 20th century, Lancaster had 1,045 residents and served hundreds more from the surrounding rural areas who worked, worshiped, attended school, and made their purchases in the town. The Texas Legislature created the Lancaster Independent School District in March 1905, and voters approved several bond elections over the next decade that improved educational facilities. Electric lighting was introduced in 1911 via the Texas Power and Light Company, when the interurban Texas Electric Railway (Dallas to Waco) ran through town. Lancaster remained tied to its surrounding agricultural lands. Farmers produced a wide range of crops, including wheat, cotton, beans, peas, and sweet potatoes. Many agricultural-related businesses also thrived until the Dust Bowl and Great Depression caused the economy to contract. On February 27, 1934, Clyde Barrow of Bonnie & Clyde fame robbed the R.P. Henry and Sons Bank that was then located near the southeast corner of the town square. Bonnie Parker waited in the getaway car on Malloy Bridge Road while Clyde and Raymond Hamilton walked in, robbed the bank, and walked out with over $4,000. In June 1936, a storm toppled Lancaster's 50,000-gallon water tower, brought down utility poles, and damaged many homes. In the early 1940s, the economic climate began to show improvement.

=== Suburbanization ===
Between 1900 and 1940, Lancaster's population grew slowly, ranging between 1,000 and 1,200 at each census. In 1950, the population had risen to just over 2,600. Soon after, the growth rate rapidly increased as Lancaster began to transform from a small town into a suburban bedroom community of Dallas. By 1960, 7,501 residents were living in the city, a 185% increase over the 1950 figure. Highlights of the 1970s included a 1975 urban renewal project to improve the town square, which had suffered a loss of businesses to areas outside of downtown, and the opening of Cedar Valley College in 1977. Significant development continued into the 1980s. A hospital, two shopping centers, four schools, several apartment complexes, and a number of new residential subdivisions were built to accommodate the growing population.

=== Recent history ===
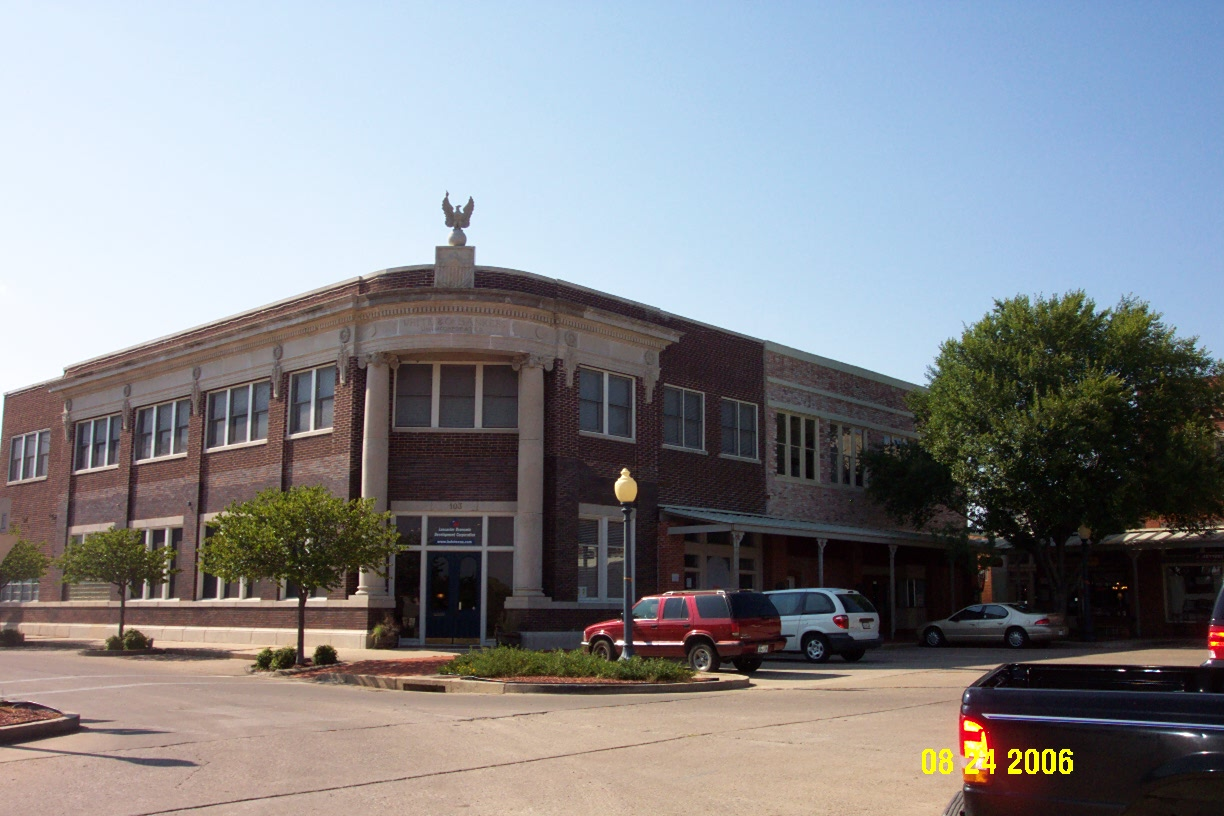
1994 Tornado damage and repair are evident in the brick color on the former White Bank Building on Lancaster's Historic Town Square.

On the night of April 25, 1994, a violent F4 tornado ripped through Lancaster, killing three and injuring nearly 50 others. More than 250 homes and every building on the town square were heavily damaged or completely destroyed by the roughly half-mile-wide tornado. The White and Company Bank building, a local landmark since 1898, was severely damaged in the tornado, but was rebuilt, and in 1998, reopened as headquarters for the Lancaster Economic Development Corporation.

In 2005 and 2006, Lancaster was a finalist for the All-America City Award. In 2007 the National Arbor Day Foundation designated Lancaster a Tree City USA.

Between 2000 and 2010, Lancaster's population increased by 40%, making it one of the fastest-growing cities in Dallas County during the decade.

On April 3, 2012, an EF-2 tornado struck the city as part of the tornado outbreak; 300 structures were reported damaged. A tornado emergency was not called for Lancaster, but a tornado emergency was called for the nearby cities of Dallas, Greenville, and Arlington. No deaths were reported from either the Lancaster tornado or any other tornado that day.

On June 23, 2019, Lancaster was one of 10 U.S. communities selected to receive the All-America City Award from the National Civic League. The city was recognized for its civic engagement and communications to address community health concerns through: the development of new and improvement of existing parks; a community health challenge with runs, walks and health fairs; and a workplace wellness program.

== Geography ==
Lancaster is located in southern Dallas County and is part of the Dallas–Fort Worth metroplex, the largest metropolitan area in Texas. According to the United States Census Bureau, the city has a total area of 30.35 sq mi (78.6 km^{2}), of which 30.28 sq mi (78.4 km^{2}) are land and 0.07 sq mi (0.18 km^{2}) is covered by water. On November 14, 2011, a tract of land covering 2.9 sq mi (7.5 km^{2}) within Lancaster's extraterritorial jurisdiction (ETJ) was annexed to the city.

Lancaster is situated within the Blackland Prairie region of Texas, which is characterized by level to gently rolling topography. Ten Mile Creek and its tributaries are major drainage features in and around the city. Because the area was used for farming and other agricultural businesses, much of the natural vegetation has been cleared. Areas near creeks have retained some of their original tree cover, which includes pecan trees, cedar elms, and several species of oaks.

=== Climate ===
Lancaster is located within the humid subtropical climate zone (Köppen climate classification: Cfa), which is characterized by hot, humid summers and mild to cool winters. Typically, July is the warmest month and January is the coolest month. The maximum average precipitation occurs in May.

Climate data for Lancaster, Texas
Month	Jan	Feb	Mar	Apr	May	Jun	Jul	Aug	Sep	Oct	Nov	Dec	Year
Mean daily maximum °F (°C)	57 (14)	61 (16)	69 (21)	77 (25)	84 (29)	92 (33)	96 (36)	96 (36)	89 (32)	79 (26)	67 (19)	58 (14)	77 (25)
Mean daily minimum °F (°C)	37 (3)	41 (5)	49 (9)	56 (13)	65 (18)	73 (23)	77 (25)	77 (25)	69 (21)	58 (14)	48 (9)	39 (4)	57 (14)
Average precipitation inches (mm)	2.06 (52)	2.70 (69)	3.49 (89)	3.07 (78)	4.92 (125)	4.11 (104)	2.21 (56)	1.87 (47)	2.84 (72)	4.79 (122)	2.88 (73)	2.74 (70)	37.68 (957)
Source: The Weather Channel (extremes)

== Demographics ==
Historical population
Census	Pop.	Note	%±
1880	497		—
1890	741		49.1%
1900	1,045		41.0%
1910	1,115		6.7%
1920	1,190		6.7%
1930	1,133		−4.8%
1940	1,151		1.6%
1950	2,632		128.7%
1960	7,501		185.0%
1970	10,522		40.3%
1980	14,807		40.7%
1990	22,117		49.4%
2000	25,894		17.1%
2010	36,361		40.4%
2020	41,275		13.5%
U.S. Decennial Census

=== Racial and ethnic composition ===
Lancaster city, Texas – Racial and ethnic composition Note: the US Census treats Hispanic/Latino as an ethnic category. This table excludes Latinos from the racial categories and assigns them to a separate category. Hispanics/Latinos may be of any race.
Race / Ethnicity (NH = Non-Hispanic)	Pop 2000	Pop 2010	Pop 2020	% 2000	% 2010	% 2020
White alone (NH)	8,703	4,689	3,144	33.61%	12.90%	7.62%
Black or African American alone (NH)	13,654	24,827	27,078	52.73%	68.28%	65.60%
Native American or Alaska Native alone (NH)	92	64	83	0.36%	0.18%	0.20%
Asian alone (NH)	99	99	145	0.38%	0.27%	0.35%
Native Hawaiian or Pacific Islander alone (NH)	13	10	10	0.05%	0.03%	0.02%
Other race alone (NH)	23	27	182	0.09%	0.07%	0.44%
Mixed race or Multiracial (NH)	309	481	833	1.19%	1.32%	2.02%
Hispanic or Latino (any race)	3,001	6,164	9,800	11.59%	16.95%	23.74%
Total	25,894	36,361	41,275	100.00%	100.00%	100.00%

=== 2020 census ===
As of the 2020 census, Lancaster had a population of 41,275, 13,792 households, and 9,660 families. The median age was 34.8 years, with 27.9% of residents under the age of 18 and 10.5% of residents 65 years of age or older. For every 100 females there were 85.6 males, and for every 100 females age 18 and over there were 79.9 males age 18 and over.

96.0% of residents lived in urban areas, while 4.0% lived in rural areas.

Of all households, 42.3% had children under the age of 18 living in them. Of those households, 38.3% were married-couple households, 16.0% were households with a male householder and no spouse or partner present, and 39.6% were households with a female householder and no spouse or partner present. About 22.3% of all households were made up of individuals and 7.0% had someone living alone who was 65 years of age or older.

There were 14,637 housing units, of which 5.8% were vacant. The homeowner vacancy rate was 1.1% and the rental vacancy rate was 8.5%.

Racial composition as of the 2020 census
Race	Number	Percent
White	4,941	12.0%
Black or African American	27,362	66.3%
American Indian and Alaska Native	297	0.7%
Asian	160	0.4%
Native Hawaiian and Other Pacific Islander	20	0.0%
Some other race	4,667	11.3%
Two or more races	3,828	9.3%

== Economy ==
In its early years, Lancaster was an agrarian market center for the surrounding area. The arrival of railroads in the late 19th century transformed the community into a transportation hub. As the city has grown, the economic base has diversified. Today, light industrial manufacturing, distribution, health care, education, residential development, and retail services are all significant components of the local economy.

Lancaster has attracted the attention of logistics-related companies in recent years. The city's location in the fast-growing Dallas–Fort Worth metroplex region, land availability, easy access to three major interstate highways, Lancaster Regional Airport, and a planned 200-acre BNSF intermodal freight facility round out the logistic options of road, rail, and air for the transport of goods. Park 20/35 at the northeast corner of Houston School Road and Cedardale Road is the largest logistics business park in Lancaster. It was developed in 2006 and now houses manufacturing and warehouse facilities for Quaker Oats/PepsiCo, Mars Petcare and BMW among others.

According to Lancaster's 2024 Annual Comprehensive Financial Report, the top employers in the city are:

#	Employer	Employees
1	Wal-Mart Stores, Inc.	2,125
2	Lancaster Independent School District	915
3	DSV	450
4	Wayfair	401
5	ThredUp	400
6	Crescent Medical Center	362
7	Niagara Bottling	350
8	City of Lancaster	299
9	Oak Creek Homes / American Homestar	295
10	Cedar Valley College	280

== Government ==
=== Local government ===
The City of Lancaster is a home-rule city with a council–manager government. Under this type of local government, the day-to-day management of the city is directed by a city manager, who is appointed by the city council and serves as chief administrative officer for the city. Opal Mauldin Robertson is the current city manager of Lancaster.

The seven-member city council consists of the mayor, who represents the city as a whole and is elected at-large, and six members elected in single-member districts. The current electoral system was implemented in 1994. The mayor and city council members serve staggered three-year terms. Clyde C. Hairston is the current mayor of Lancaster.

District	Council member
1	Carol Strain-Burk
2	Stanley Jaglowski
3	Marco Mejia
4	Derrick D. Robinson
5	Mitchell Cheatham, Mayor Pro Tem
6	Betty Gooden-Davis, Deputy Mayor Pro Tem

Lancaster is a voluntary member of the North Central Texas Council of Governments, the purpose of which is to co-ordinate individual and collective local governments and facilitate regional solutions, eliminate unnecessary duplication, and enable joint decisions.

=== State and national representation ===
Lancaster is located in Texas' 30th congressional district of the U.S. House of Representatives and is represented by Democrat Jasmine Crockett. In the Texas Legislature, Lancaster is in District 23 of the Texas Senate, represented by Democrat Royce West. In the Texas House of Representatives, the city is part of District 109, which is represented by Democrat Aicha Davis.

== Education ==
=== Primary and secondary schools ===
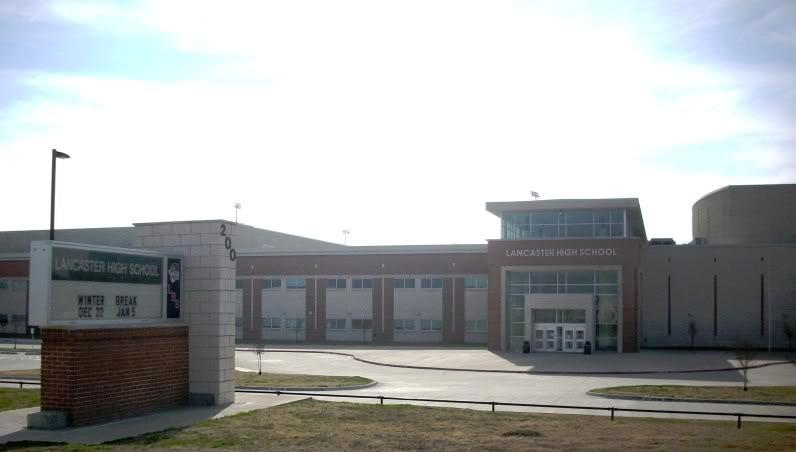
Lancaster High School

Lancaster is served mainly by the Lancaster Independent School District (LISD). The school district consists of 11 campuses: seven elementary schools, one sixth grade center, one middle school, one high school, and an alternative school. Approximately 6,800 students were enrolled in LISD as of Fall 2013.

The Dallas Independent School District (DISD) serves a small portion of the city that includes the subdivisions of Cedardale Highlands, Taylor Brothers, and Lancaster Gardens. Students living in this area are zoned to Wilmer-Hutchins Elementary School, Kennedy-Curry Middle School, and Wilmer-Hutchins High School. The area had been part of the Wilmer-Hutchins Independent School District (WHISD) until the district was ordered closed prior to the start of the 2005–2006 school year. Dallas ISD agreed to absorb WHISD after Lancaster, which was given the first option to take over the district, declined.

Some of the city's territory is in the Ferris Independent School District.

Two public charter schools are in the city. Life School Lancaster opened in 2007 and serves students from kindergarten through sixth grade. In January 2012, the Accelerated Intermediate Academy (AIA) opened an elementary campus in Lancaster on East Belt Line Road.

=== Colleges and universities ===
Cedar Valley College, a two-year accredited institution affiliated with the Dallas County Community College District (DCCCD) is located on the border of Lancaster and Dallas. The college offers workforce training, continuing education, and college preparatory programs. As of spring 2013, 6,375 students were enrolled at the campus.

The University of North Texas at Dallas campus is located just north of the Lancaster city limits in far southern Dallas.

=== Public library ===
Lancaster Veterans Memorial Library is located in Lancaster Community Park. The library relocated from a building on West Main Street in downtown to its present location in May 2001. The 23,000-square-foot (2,100 m^{2}) facility includes a public meeting room, reading lounge, and genealogical center. Lancaster residents can obtain a library card free of charge, which entitles the bearer to borrow materials and use the public-access internet computers. Nonresidents may purchase a library card for a nominal, annual fee.

Just north of the library is a paved contemplative garden funded by the nonprofit Friends of the Lancaster Veterans Memorial Library organization.

== Media ==
Lancaster's newspaper of record is the Focus Daily News. The DeSoto-based daily newspaper serves the southern suburbs of Dallas and is currently the largest circulation suburban daily newspaper in Texas. The newspaper can be found all over the town square and other parts of the city.

== Parks and recreation ==
The responsibilities of Lancaster's Parks and Recreation Department include park maintenance, recreation programs, and management of recreational facilities.

=== Parks ===
The system of public parks in Lancaster covers more than 600 acres. The 170-acre Lancaster Community Park is the most-used park in the city. It features a 6-acre pond known as Contemplation Lake with a fishing pier, lighted football and soccer fields, hiking/biking trails, playground, amphitheater, and the Royce Clayton Baseball Field, which has a covered grandstand that can seat 500 spectators. The Recreation Center, Senior Life Center, Library, and Public Safety Building are located in the park.

Lancaster City Park is another highly used park in the city with four baseball/softball fields, two playgrounds, two tennis courts, a basketball court, walking trail, and an off-leash area for dogs. The park also has two concession stands and two large pavilions, each with 15 tables. The Cedardale Park and Complex in northern Lancaster contains baseball/softball fields, a basketball court, playground, and concession stand. There are smaller neighborhood parks located throughout the city with playgrounds and other amenities. They are J.A. Dewberry Park, Jaycee Park, Kids Square Park, Meadowcreek Park, Rocky Crest Park, Stanford Park, and Verona Park. Heritage Park, which contains an iconic gazebo, is located north of the historic town square in downtown Lancaster. The newest addition to the park system is the 2.4 mile Pleasant Run Hike and Bike Trail, which opened in the spring of 2010 and is routed through neighborhoods in central Lancaster.

Two nature preserves have been established in Lancaster, Bear Creek Nature Park and the Ten Mile Creek Preserve. The 189-acre Bear Creek Nature Park was created on land purchased with a $500,000 matching grant from the Texas Parks and Wildlife Department. Features of the park site include equestrian and walking trails with interpretive signage, a fishing pond, climbing rock, butterfly garden, and a large pavilion for picnics. Additionally, there is an outdoor classroom and educational programs available for children. The Ten Mile Creek Preserve sits on land donated to the city by Dallas County. It remains largely undeveloped to protect the natural meadows and wooded areas. A two-mile unpaved trail runs through the preserve.

=== Facilities ===
The 64,000-sq-ft Lancaster Recreation Center features an indoor water park, gymnasium, elevated jogging track, and fitness atrium with an aerobics/dance room. The building also includes a banquet room and catering kitchen that can be used for meetings and other social events. The banquet room has a covered outdoor terrace and courtyard that overlooks Contemplation Lake.

The Senior Life Center is a full-service activity center serving adults aged 50 years and older. The 11,500-sq-ft building opened in December 2008. The facility includes a dining hall, commercial kitchen, classrooms, computer lab, and reading lounge. Transportation to and from the center is available for Lancaster residents in need.

Country View Golf Course is an 18-hole, par-70 public golf course located on West Belt Line Road. It was designed by Florida architect Ron Garl, and opened for play in 1989. The course spans 6,461 yards from the back tee with Bermuda grass fairways. It has a chipping area, putting green, and driving range, as well as on-site golf pro shop and sports bar.

== Culture ==
=== Landmarks ===
Lancaster has three properties listed on the National Register of Historic Places: the Randlett House, the Captain R. A. Rawlins House, and the W. A. Strain Farm-Strain House.

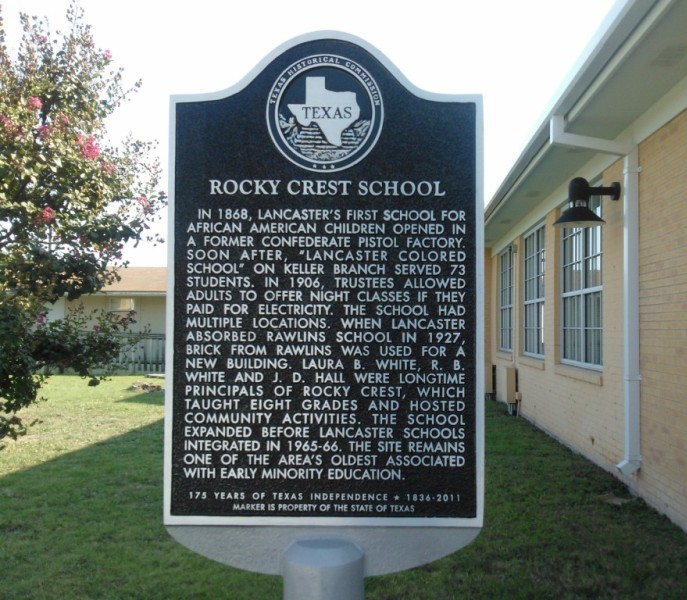
Texas Historical Marker at the site of Rocky Crest School, which served Lancaster's African-American students prior to desegregation.

The Texas Historical Commission has designated 14 sites in the Lancaster area with historical markers. Listed below are the sites in Lancaster with state historical markers and the year they received the designation:

- Towns/communities
  - Town of Lancaster (1974) – This marker commemorates the founding of Lancaster and is located in the Historic Town Square.
  - Pleasant Run (1974) – This marker commemorates the former Pleasant Run community and is located at the Regions Bank building on North Dallas Avenue.
- Historic Homes
  - Captain R. A. Rawlins House (1964) - The current descendant of Captain R. A. Rawlins still owns the house, and is the only owner in any historical house in Lancaster related to the original owner.
  - W. A. Strain House (1977)
  - Winniford House (1994)
- Educational Institution
  - Rocky Crest School (2012)
- Graveyard
  - Edgewood Cemetery (1974)
- Places of worship
  - First Presbyterian Church of Lancaster (1976)
  - First United Methodist Church of Lancaster (1976)
  - First Baptist Church of Lancaster (1977)
  - First Christian Church of Lancaster (1979)
  - St. Paul Freewill Baptist Church (1985)
- Former sites
  - Site of the Confederate Arms Factory (1936)
  - Former Site of Head House (1978)

== Infrastructure ==
=== Transportation ===
Lancaster is served by two interstate highways. Interstate 35E forms the western boundary of the city and east–west access is provided by Interstate 20, located on the far-north side of Lancaster. Interstate 45 is situated approximately five miles to the east.

Principal thoroughfares within the city include State Highway 342 (running north–south, also known as Dallas Avenue), Houston School Road (north-south), Pleasant Run Road (east-west), and Belt Line Road (east-west).

Lancaster Regional Airport is a public-use airport located two miles southeast of the central business district of Lancaster. Currently used for general aviation purposes, the airport is publicly owned by City of Lancaster and serves as a reliever airport for Dallas–Fort Worth International Airport and Dallas Love Field. It has one runway designated 13/31 with an asphalt surface measuring 6,502 by 100 feet (1,982 x 30 m).

The city has public transportation, and is not a member of Dallas Area Rapid Transit (DART). The Cedar Valley College campus is served by Bus Route 553, which is currently the southernmost stop on DART.

=== Health care ===
Crescent Medical Center Lancaster is an 84-bed acute-care general hospital located at 2600 West Pleasant Run Road. The hospital was formerly known as the Medical Center at Lancaster, which closed in 2008. After being purchased by new owners and undergoing major renovations, Crescent Medical Center opened on June 17, 2013.
