= ThredUp =

American company

- Type: Public
- Traded as: Nasdaq: TDUP
- Founded: 2009; 17 years ago
- Founders: James Reinhart, Chris Homer and Oliver Lubin
- Headquarters: Oakland, California
- Revenue: ▲US$311 million (2025)
- Net income: ▲ −US$20.2 million (2025)
- Website: thredup.com

ThredUp Inc. is an American company that operates an online resale platform specializing in the sale of second-hand clothing, footwear, and accessories. Founded in 2009 and headquartered in Oakland, California, it has established itself as one of the leading resale fashion marketplaces.

== History ==
ThredUp was founded in 2009 by James Reinhart, Chris Homer, and Oliver Lubin who raised US$131 million in a funding round.

In 2019, ThredUp launched Thrift Cards. Two years later, it was listed on the Nasdaq.

Since its inception, ThredUp has processed more than 137 million secondhand items from approximately 55,000 different brands. The company has several distribution centers in the United States and Europe, allowing it to efficiently manage its inventory and meet customer demand.

In the first half of 2023, ThredUp increased its sales by 4% to €99.8 million, substantially reducing its negative result to €38.5 million.

== Business model ==
The ThredUp marketplace provides services both to consumers and business. In B2C they provide two separate services: One to customers who want to sell their used clothes. The company sends those customers a free “Clean Out Kit” which is a bag in which they can send all the used clothes they want with free shipping. ThredUp sorts, evaluates and presents the clothes for selling. The customer receives compensation via a cash payment or online credit and is also given the option to donate to charity. The second service is to customers who can use their page to find and purchase clothes sorted by brand, type or style.

ThredUp also offers a B2B service to brand retailers. Through resale as a service (RaaS) partnerships they give the fashion brands Clean Out Kits that they can use to provide a return service to their own customers in exchange for in-store credit.
