= Polo neck =

Garment with a collar that covers the neck

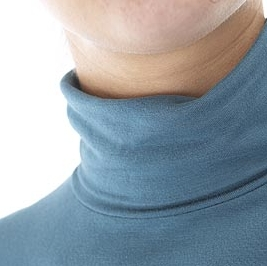
A person wearing a folded polo neck

A polo neck, roll-neck (South Africa), turtleneck (United States, Canada), or skivvy (Australia) is a garment—usually a sweater—with a close-fitting collar that folds over and covers the neck. It can also refer to the type of neckline, the style of collar itself, or be used as an adjective ("polo necked").

A simpler variant of the standard polo neck is the mock polo neck (or mock turtleneck), that resembles the polo neck with the soft fold at its top and the way it stands up around the neck, but both ends of the tube forming the collar are sewn to the neckline. This is mainly used to achieve the appearance of a polo neck where the fabric would fray, roll, or otherwise behave badly unless sewn. The mock polo neck clings to the neck smoothly, is easy to manufacture, and works well with a zip closure.

== History ==
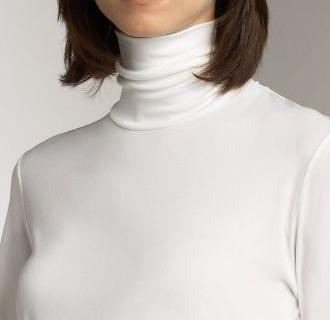
Woman in an unfolded polo neck.

=== Europe ===
Turtle neck–like garments have been worn for hundreds of years, dating at least to the 15th century. They were originally designed to protect the necks of knights wearing chainmail. Royalty adopted high-neck fashion, with the height and volume of the neck ruffle indicating status.

From the late 19th century on polo necks were commonly worn by fishermen, manual workers, athletes, sailors and naval officers. Since the middle of that century, black polo necks have been closely associated with leftist radical academics, philosophers, artists and intellectuals. The polo neck jumper became an iconic symbol of the French philosopher Michel Foucault. Polo necks also became a big fashion for wealthy young men after they were worn by European film stars Marcello Mastroianni and Yves Montand.

Greta Garbo often wore polo necks and trousers privately, as later Audrey Hepburn would do in official photographs.

Vladimir Putin of Russia, Andreas Papandreou of Greece, and Emmanuel Macron of France are examples of European leaders who are fond of wearing polo necks.

=== United States ===
At the turn of the 19th and 20th centuries the high neckline blouse became a fashionable option for young women as part of the emergence of the Gibson Girl. Their adoption by Noël Coward in the 1920s turned polo necks into a brief middle-class fashion trend, and feminists made them into a unisex item. Absorbed into mainstream American fashion by the mid 20th century, the polo neck came to be viewed as an anti-tie, a smart form of dress for those who rejected formal wear. Senator Ted Kennedy, pianist/conductor Vladimir Ashkenazy, conductor Seiji Ozawa, philosopher Michel Foucault, shipping tycoon Stavros Niarchos, singer Barry Manilow, scientist Carl Sagan, Oracle Corporation co-founder Larry Ellison, and Apple Inc. co-founder Steve Jobs were among those often seen in polo necks. Disgraced Theranos founder Elizabeth Holmes deliberately copied Steve Jobs' style in wearing a black polo neck.

Over time it became a fad among teenage girls, especially in a lightweight form that emphasised their figures. It was not long before Hollywood was also exploiting this image as part of the sweater girl look.

By the late 1950s the "tight turtleneck" had been adopted as part of the preppy style among students, a style emphasising neatness, tidiness and grooming. This would become an important aspect of the polo neck's image in the United States.

Hippies were often seen sporting turtlenecks throughout the 1960s and 1970s.

Very elegant polo necks of silk or nylon knit, especially made with French cuffs for formal dress affairs, have also seen success in American fashion.

== As an alternative to the necktie ==
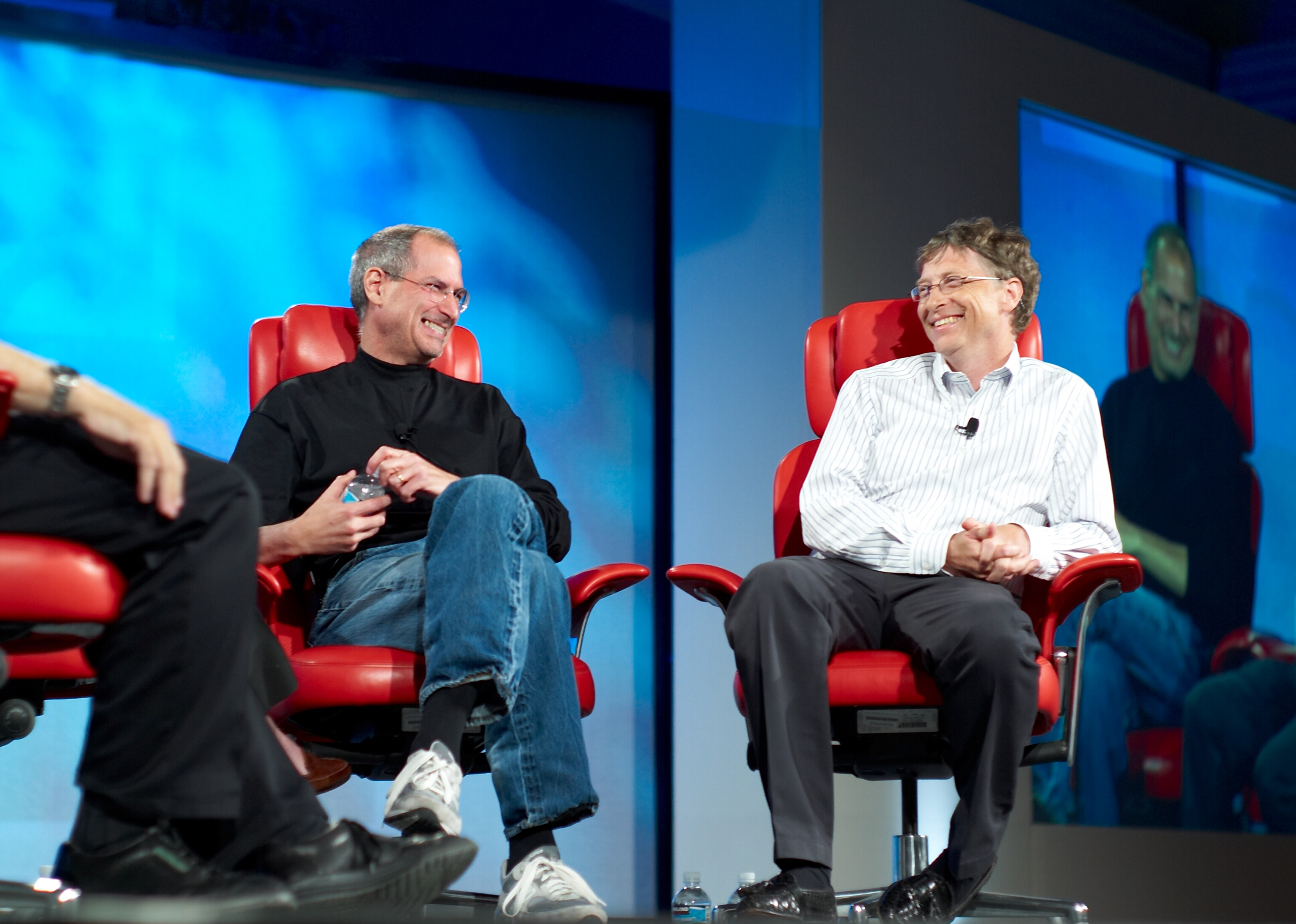
Steve Jobs (left) wearing his signature mock polo neck by Issey Miyake

Polo necks have been used as substitutes for a shirt-and-tie since the 1920s. This was sometimes frowned upon in upscale restaurants and at weddings.

John Berendt wrote in Esquire:

The turtleneck was the boldest of all the affronts to the status quo. It was the picture of masculine poise and arrogance, redolent of athletes, sportsmen, even U-boat commanders. The simplicity of its design made neckties seem fussy and superfluous by comparison

Furthermore, designer Halston commented:

Turtlenecks are the most comfortable garment you can wear. They move with the body, and they're flattering too, because they accentuate the face and elongate the figure. They make life so easy: you can wear a turtleneck to work and then afterwards throw on a jacket, and it becomes very dressy. You can go anywhere you like.

== See also ==
- Beatnik
- Lacoste
- Polo shirt
- Ralph Lauren Corporation
- Collar (clothing)
