= History of African Americans in Dallas–Fort Worth =

The Dallas–Fort Worth metroplex has 1.2 million African-Americans, the second-largest metro population of African-Americans in Texas. For the first time in history, between 2020 and 2023, the Dallas metro area had the nation's highest net migration of African Americans, surpassing long-time leader the Atlanta metro area.

In 2007, Black Enterprise magazine ranked Dallas as a "Top 10 city for African-Americans".

== History ==
=== Slavery ===
Jane Elkins was the first enslaved person to be legally bought in Dallas county, having been sold to John Young for $400 in 1844. In 1853, after being convicted of her owner's murder, Jane was hanged and became the first woman to be legally executed in the state of Texas. It is widely believed by historians that Jane was likely innocent and/or did not receive a fair trial on account of being a slave.

In the mid-1800s, lynchings of African Americans took place in Dealey Plaza. Today, Martyr's Park near Dealey Plaza is the site of historical markers memorializing the victims of these crimes: Patrick Jennings, Samuel Smith, and Cato Miller. In addition, enslaved Dallas woman Jane Elkins is also memorialized there.

Freed slaves began to locate to the Dallas area when slavery was abolished. Freedmen's Cemetery was established in 1861. In the late 19th century, there were over 11,000 black people in Dallas.

=== 20th century ===
In 1953, the Hamilton Park neighborhood was one of the first suburbs in Texas to be built for African Americans.

In the 1990s, the number of African-Americans making annual incomes of $100,000 or more (adjusted to $75,000 as of 1990, from the circa 2005 number) increased by 300%.

In 1995, Dallas elected its first black mayor, Ron Kirk.

=== 21st century ===
Around 2005, increasing numbers of African-Americans moved to suburban communities to the north.

The Dallas–Fort Worth metroplex gained approximately 259,000 new African-Americans between 2010 and 2020, or a nearly 27% increase, 10th of U.S. metropolitan statistical areas during that time span. According to the Brookings Institution, in the years 2006–2010, an annual average of 7,678 black people migrated into the DFW area, giving it the fourth-highest inward black migration of all U.S. metropolitan areas.

In 2012, Jamie Thompson of D Magazine stated that Dallas "still suffers from an image problem among black professionals who perceive other cities—Atlanta; Chicago; Houston; or Washington, D.C.—as being more appealing and friendly to blacks".

In 2019, Dallas elected its second black mayor, Eric Johnson.

Black-owned businesses in the Dallas-Fort Worth area make up about 3.0%, or just over 3,000 businesses.

In addition to the New Great Migration, since around 2010, many African Americans have been moving to the metroplex for its affordable cost of living and job opportunities.

== Geography ==
In 1850, there were at least 207 black people in Dallas County, making up less than 10% of the county population. Historically, the black community was strongly concentrated in the inner-city areas of Dallas and Fort Worth, but this has slowly changed since the 1980s.

In the northern suburbs, the black population rate has grown 178% since the 1990s. The strongest growth is in the southern suburbs; for example, Cedar Hill was approximately 51.9% black in 2010, after a gain of more than 12,500 new black residents since 2000. The southern suburbs (DeSoto, Duncanville, Lancaster, Cedar Hill) have been noted as the core of the African-American middle class and upper middle class community in the metroplex.

Stop Six is a historically black neighborhood in Fort Worth.

In 2005, Mansfield had 62 households of African-Americans with annual incomes of at least $100,000; there were none in 1990 with the equivalent in 1990 dollars ($75,000). That same year, the median income of African-American households in Rowlett was higher than the overall median income for that city.

== Politics and economy ==
In 1995, the city of Dallas elected its first black mayor, Ron Kirk. He held office from 1995 to 2002. In 2019, Dallas elected its second black mayor, Eric Johnson.

Dallas' Black Chamber of commerce was established in 1926 and is the oldest in the United States. Fort Worth and some surrounding cities also have a black chamber of commerce.

== Media ==
The Dallas Weekly is the largest African-American-centric publication based in the region. The Dallas Examiner is the other widely circulated African-American-centric publication in the metroplex.

Other black newspapers include the Dallas edition of African-American News and Issues, Black Economic Times, Community Quest, The Dallas Post Tribune, LaVita News/The Black Voice in Arlington, Minority Business News, and Minority Opportunity News Gazette.

The Dallas Express was published in the city from 1892 to 1970.

== Education ==
=== Primary and secondary schools ===
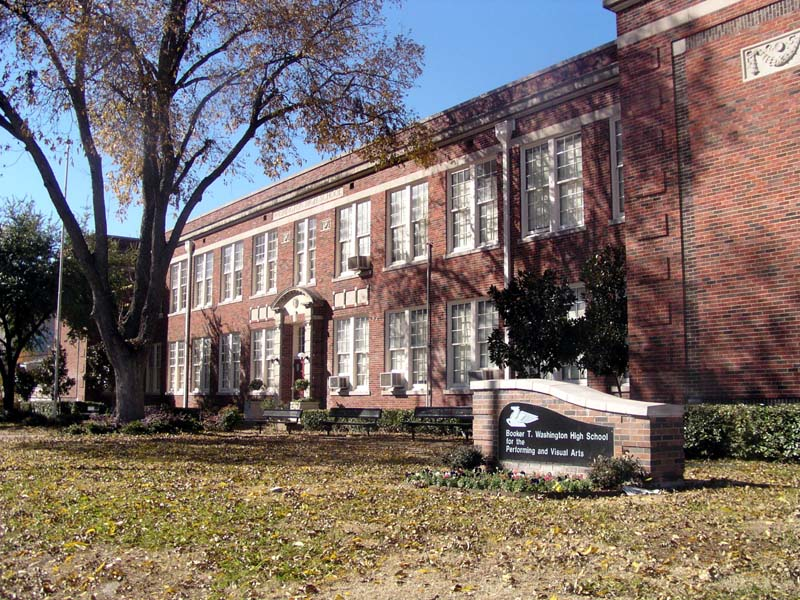
Booker T. Washington High School for the Performing and Visual Arts, a magnet school, was previously a school reserved for black children.

==== Segregation era ====
In the era before the racial integration of schools, Dallas Independent School District had five high schools for blacks: Booker T. Washington, Lincoln, James Madison, and two others for a brief period: Franklin D. Roosevelt, and L. G. Pinkston. Other schools for black children included George Washington Carver Elementary School (in West Dallas), Benjamin Franklin Darrell Elementary School, Frederick Douglass Elementary School, Eagle Ford Elementary School, Joseph J. Rhoads Elementary School, H.S. Thompson Elementary School, Phyllis Wheatley Elementary School, and Colonial School.

9th Ward School was the first secondary school for black children; its name was changed to Dallas Colored High School in 1893, and in 1927 the building was converted to B.F. Darrell Elementary School, named after a principal at Dallas Colored High. The former Dallas Colored transitioned into Booker T. Washington High School, which opened in 1922. Colored School No. 4 became Frederick Douglass Elementary School in 1902. In 1930 Phyllis Wheatley Elementary was built. In 1939 Lincoln High School, the second black high school, opened. Carver Elementary opened in 1954. In 1955, due to the increasing number of black students around Fair Park, the former Lagow Elementary School for white children was converted into the Joseph J. Rhoads Elementary School for black children; it was the first racially converted school in Dallas. In 1956 the former Forest Avenue High School for whites was converted into Madison High for blacks. Colonial School was converted into a school for black children in 1957. Roosevelt opened in 1963.

The Catholic church operated St. Peter's Academy for black children in Dallas.

Carrollton Colored School was the school for black children in the Carrollton-Farmers Branch Independent School District in the segregation era.

==== Post-segregation ====
Around 2005 increasing numbers of African-American students attended schools in the Best Southwest area. Wealthier African-American parents often moved to different school districts to get perceived better educations for their children. Around that same time period increasing numbers of wealthier African-American families were sending their children to private schools; in 2001 there were 5,400 black students in the region's private schools.

From 2000 to 2010 the number of black students in Dallas ISD decreased by 20,000. In 2010 that was the lowest in the post-1965 history of DISD. One reason for the decline in the percentage of black students is the move of black people to suburbs; they did so due to a perception that public schools there have a higher quality than those in DISD, as well as general desires for higher quality housing and lower crime environments. Another reason was the growth in charter schools which take students who would otherwise attend DISD schools; in 2010 5,900 black students attending charter schools in the area lived in the DISD boundaries. Other reasons for the decline in the percentage of black students included a perception that DISD has moved its focus away from black students and towards Hispanic students, and the fact that many Hispanics have moved into traditionally black neighborhoods.

=== Colleges and universities ===
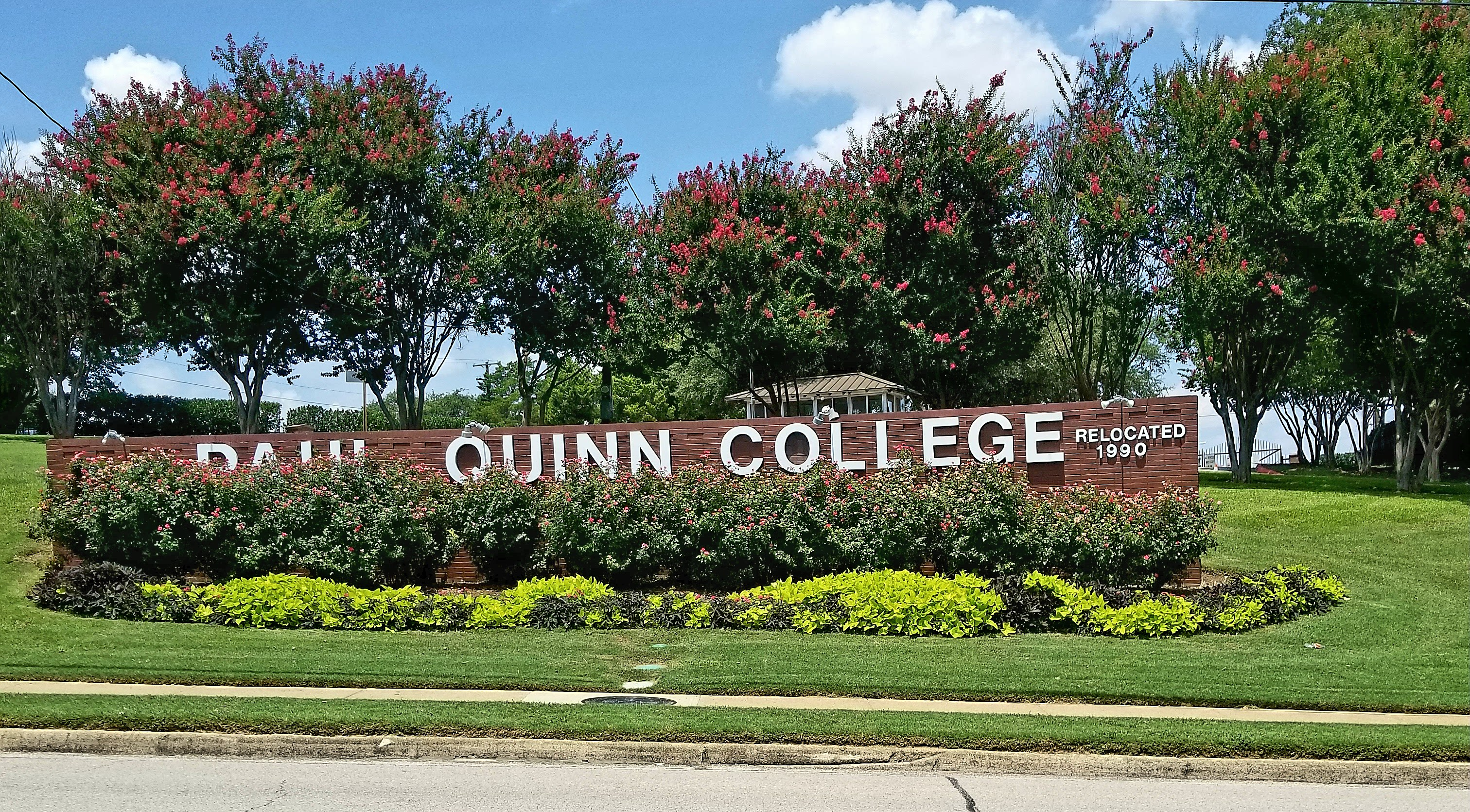
Paul Quinn College, a historically black, Methodist university

Paul Quinn College is the only HBCU in the Dallas. Southwestern Christian College in Terrell, Texas is the second HBCU in the Dallas-Fort Worth Metroplex.

In 1961, Bishop College, a black college in Marshall, moved to Dallas but closed in 1988.

In the late 1940s, Texas Vocational school provided black World War II veterans vocational courses.

The University of Texas at Arlington leads Texas in awarding the most bachelor's and master's degrees to African-Americans.

== Recreation ==
The DFW metroplex is also home to one of the largest HBCU football classics in the country with the State Fair Classic.

Dallas Black Restaurant Week promotes and celebrates black-owned restaurants and culinary professionals in the DFW Metroplex.

Dallas Black Pride is the largest black LGBT celebration in Texas.

African-American cultural points of interest include the African-American Museum of Dallas in Fair Park and the Dallas Black Dance Theatre and the Black Academy of Arts and Letters, both in downtown. The South Dallas Cultural Center emphasizes supporting and displaying blacks in the performing, literary, and visual arts. In Fort Worth, the Lenora Roll Heritage Center Museum and National Multicultural Western Heritage Museum highlight African-American culture and history, primarily in the North Texas region. In Irving, the Jackie Townsell Bear Creek Heritage Center is a museum that tells the story of Bear Creek of West Irving, one of the oldest established black communities in North Texas.

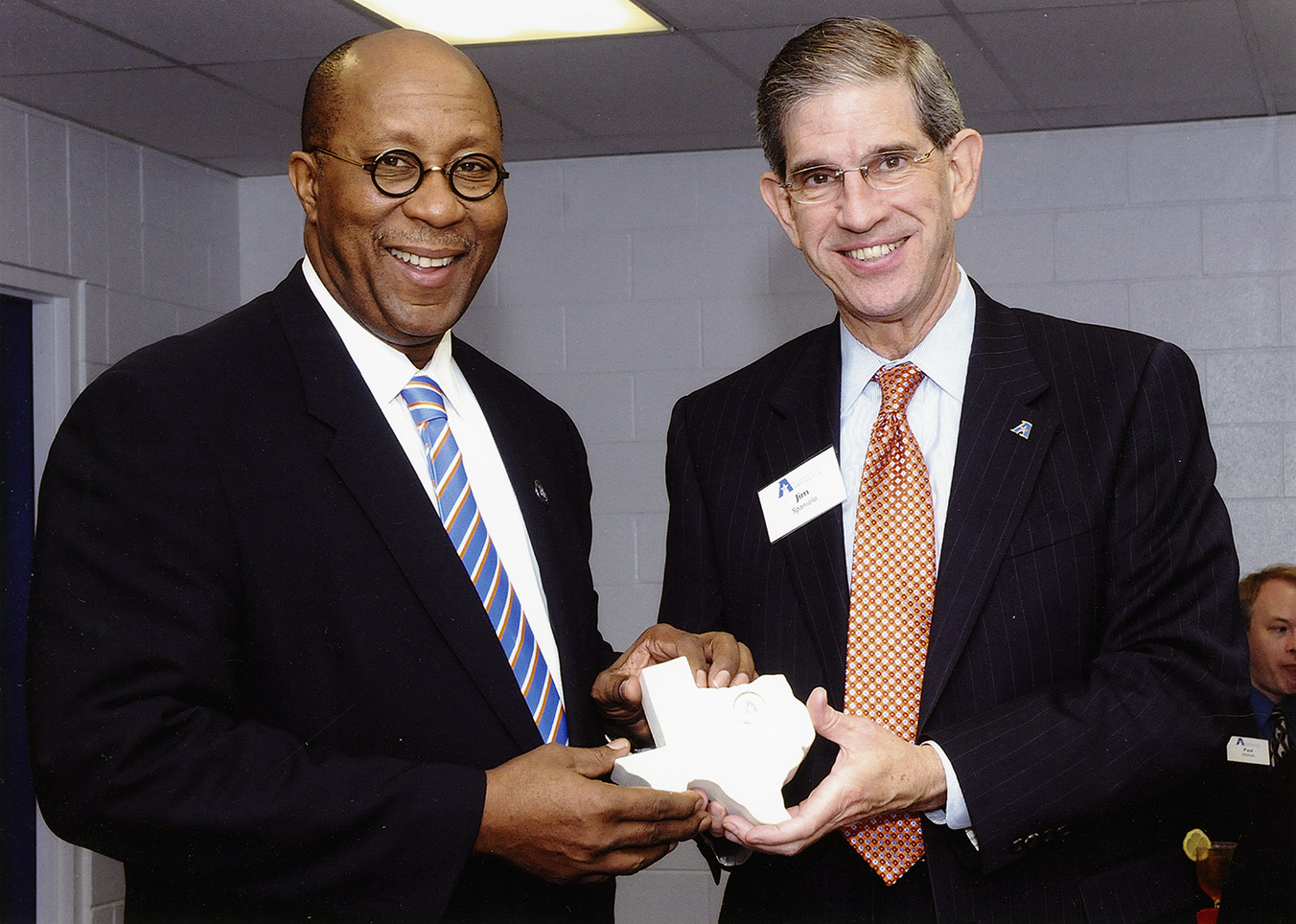
University of Texas at Arlington President Spaniolo with former Dallas Mayor Ron Kirk

== Notable people ==
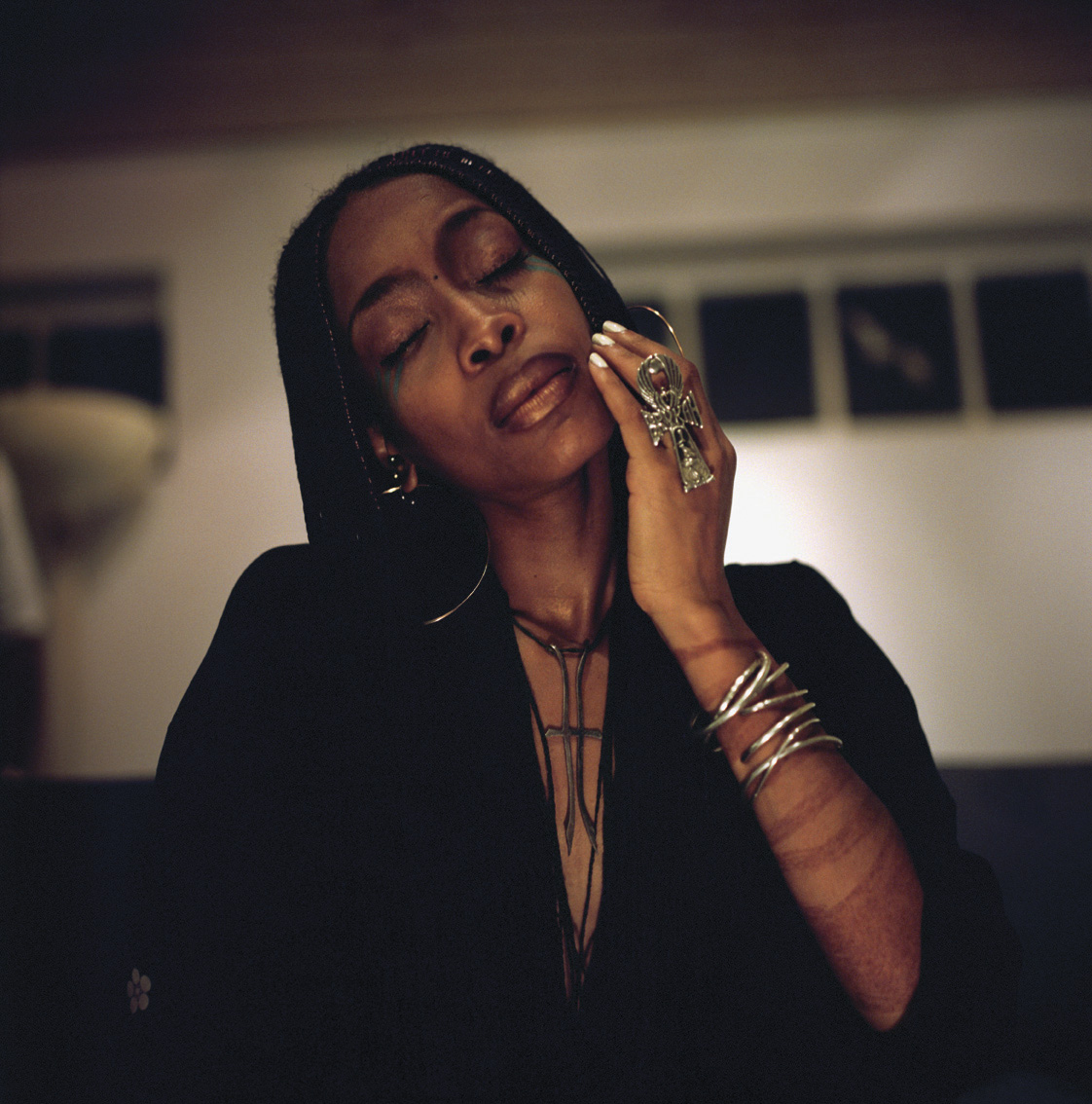
Erykah Badu, R&B musician from Dallas

- Erykah Badu – R&B/soul artist
- Erica Banks – rapper
- Big Tuck – rapper
- Chris Bosh – former NBA player
- Juanita Craft – civil rights activist and politician
- The D.O.C. – rapper
- Kirk Franklin – gospel singer
- Bishop T.D. Jakes – gospel preacher
- Eric Johnson – mayor of Dallas
- Jill Marie Jones – actress
- Ron Kirk – the first black mayor of Dallas
- Lil Twist – rapper
- David Mann – actor and singer
- Tamela Mann – actress and singer
- MO3 – rapper
- Deion Sanders – TV personality and former NFL player
- Bobby Sessions – rapper
- A. Maceo Smith – civil rights activist
- Emmitt Smith – TV personality and former NFL player
- Lucille Elizabeth Bishop Smith – entrepreneur and chef (Fort Worth)
- Spinderella – hip-hop DJ
- Yella Beezy – rapper
- George Keaton Jr., African American historian who focused on Dallas' black community

== See also ==
- History of the African Americans in Texas
  - History of African Americans in Houston
  - History of African Americans in San Antonio
  - History of African Americans in Austin
- Demographics of Dallas–Fort Worth
- History of Mexican Americans in Dallas–Fort Worth
- History of Nigerian Americans in Dallas–Fort Worth
- "Black cowboys"
- Chinese Americans in Dallas–Fort Worth
- Indian Americans in Dallas–Fort Worth
