= Irma Rangel =

Irma Rangel may refer to:

- Irma Rangel (Texas politician) (1931–2003), member of the Texas House of Representatives
- Irma Lerma Rangel Young Women's Leadership School in Dallas, Texas
- Irma Lerma Rangel College of Pharmacy in College Station and Kingsville, Texas
