= Barack Obama Male Leadership Academy =

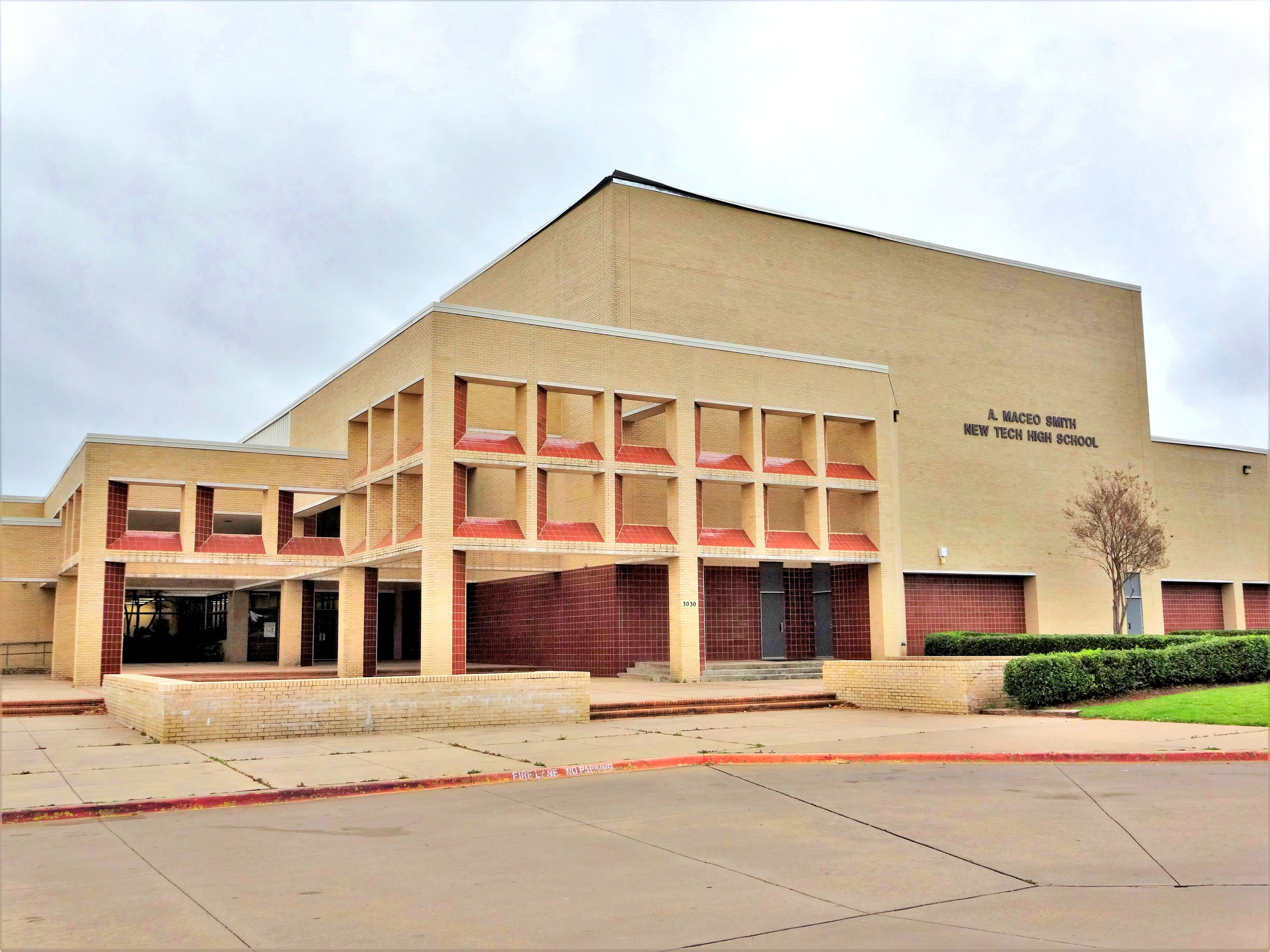
- The former A. Maceo Smith New Tech High School, now housing BOMLA

Location
- 3030 Stag Road; Dallas, Texas 75241; United States
- Coordinates: 32°41′31″N 96°45′54″W

Information
- School type: Magnet
- Motto: Believe. Achieve. Succeed.
- Established: 2011
- Sister school: Irma Lerma Rangel Young Women's Leadership Academy
- School district: Dallas Independent School District
- Grades: 6-12
- Gender: Male
- Sports: Lacrosse
- Mascot: Eagles
- Nickname: BOMLA

Barack Obama Male Leadership Academy at A. Maceo Smith (BOMLA) is a magnet secondary school for boys located in the Oak Cliff area of Dallas, Texas. It is a part of the Dallas Independent School District. After the Irma Lerma Rangel Young Women's Leadership School, it is DISD's second single gender school.

The school, which occupies the campus of the former A. Maceo Smith High School, is named after former President of the United States Barack Obama, in honor of the fact that he was the first black President. The campus was named for Antonio Maceo Smith (1903–1977), a pioneer civil rights leader in Dallas.

== History ==
The former B. F. Darrell Vanguard Elementary School campus was renovated until Barack Obama Male Leadership Academy at B.F. Darrell opened. Obama opened in August 2011 with grades 6 through 9. Each subsequent year a grade level will be added until the school gets grade 12. The school had 205 students during its first year of operation. The school was dedicated on November 11, 2011.

In 2018 Obama swapped buildings with New Tech High School, with the latter now occupying B. F. Darrell while Obama now occupied the A. Maceo Smith campus, where Obama has the potential to increase its enrollment.

== Admissions ==
A prospective student needs to meet entrance requirements before being considered for admission. He must have sufficient grade point averages in the core classes and score within the fortieth percentile in his examinations, such as the State of Texas Assessment of Academic Readiness (STAAR) or the Iowa Tests of Basic Skills (ITBS). If a prospective student meets the requirements, he will take an examination measuring his writing and mathematics skills.

== Academics ==
Obama offers classes in German, Spanish, and robotics. 8th grade students have "accelerated curriculum" schedules. All students have access to pre-Advanced Placement classes. Students are expected to maintain an average of 85 and above. All students are required to attend Saturday Academy once a month for enrichment and academic support.

== School norms ==
Students are required to address teachers using the standard "Mister" "Miss" or "Mrs." honorifics. Students are required to use the honorific "Brother." For instance, John Smith would be "Brother John Smith" and Fred Jones would be "Brother Fred Jones." Faculty members also use the "brother" honorific to address students.

Students and Teachers of the Barack Obama Male Leadership Academy are put into four houses(the only expectation being the principal and the House point manager). These Houses are The House of Justice, The House of Alliance, The House of Decree, and finally the House of Expedition. These houses compete with each other to gain "house points" These points can be gained by behaving well and showing kindness to other fellow students but the reverse can also happen if a student is acting unwell then house points will be taken away from their house. Another way to gain house points is to complete and win in a "house competition" These competitions happen every other Friday and include a wide variety of activities such as Trivia and other sports. At the end of the semester or at the end of the year the total amount of house points is added and the house with the most house points receives a special reward such as a Game of Laser Tag and or a party.

=== Uniform ===
Students are required to wear school uniforms. The uniform includes a blue oxford shirt, a tie, slacks, a black belt, student identification badge, and a jacket. All students are required to wear navy blazers while students are in hallways or common areas, but students may remove the blazers while in class. Middle school students wear gray ties, while high school students wear navy ties.

== Athletics ==
Lacrosse is currently available for 6th-8th grade students through a partnership with Bridge Lacrosse. Additionally, sixth-grade students can participate on the basketball team. Students are also allowed to participate in sports at their home school location if the sport is not available at Barack Obama.

== Demographics ==
As of the 2021 school year, 71% of students were Hispanic, 26% were Black, 1% were Asian, and 1% were White.
