= Rajdhani College, Bhubaneswar =

Indian government college

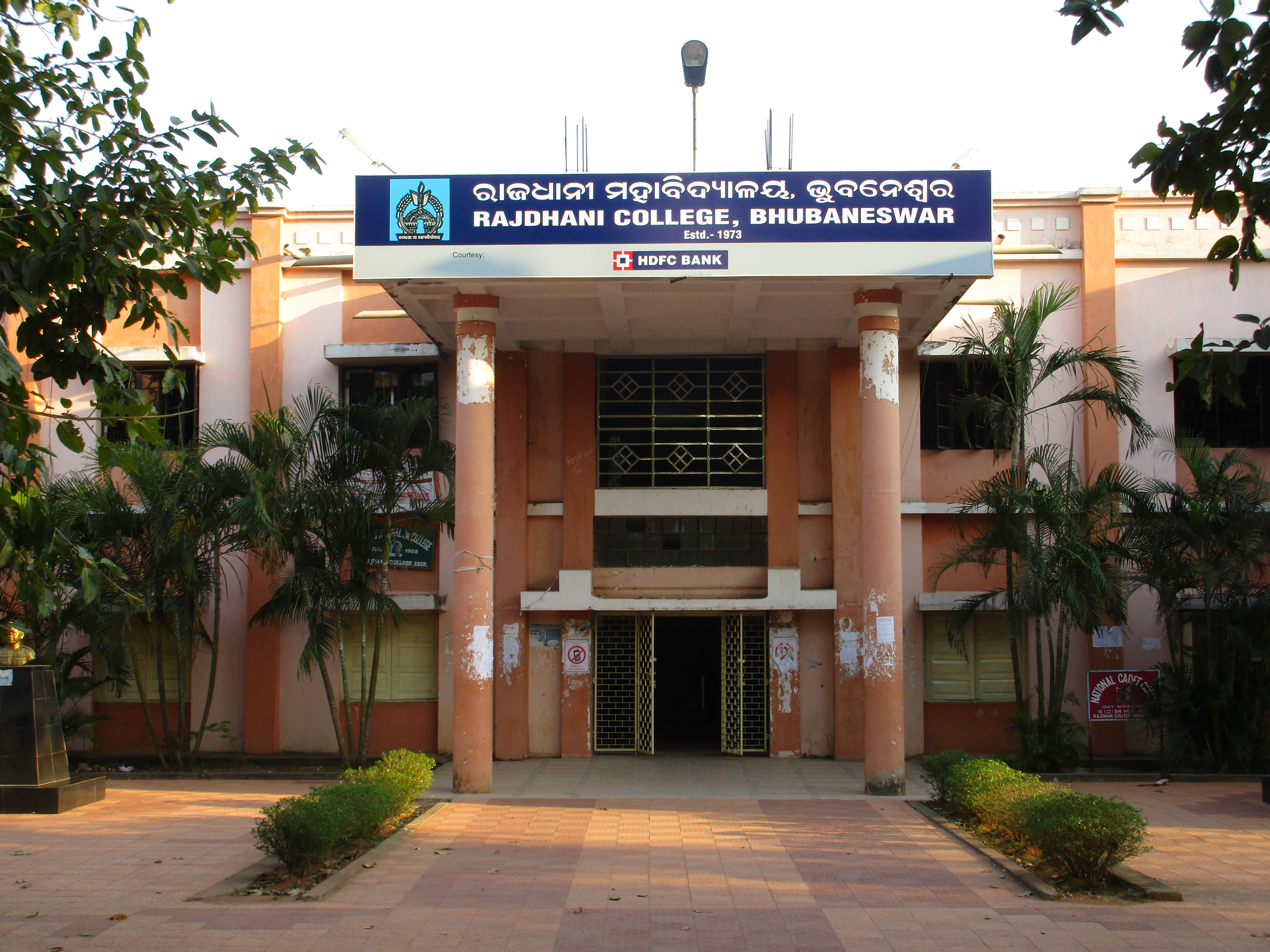
- Type: Co-education
- Established: 1973
- Academic affiliations: Utkal University, CHSE, Odisha
- Principal: Dr Saroja Kanta Choudhury
- Location: Bhubaneswar, Odisha, India
- Website: http://www.rajdhanicollege.org.in/

Rajdhani College is a premier co-educational institution owned by the Government of Odisha and located in the capital city of Bhubaneswar, Odisha. Established in 1973, it was one of Bhubaneswar's three foundational government colleges dedicated to general science and arts education, alongside Buxi Jagabandhu Bidyadhar (BJB) College and the College of Basic Science and Humanities. In 1975, the college transitioned to a temporary government building in Unit-I, where it operated independently for fourteen years before relocating to its permanent campus in Baramunda in 1989. Today, the college is affiliated with the Council of Higher Secondary Education (CHSE), Odisha, for its 10+2 streams, and with Utkal University for its undergraduate (UG) and postgraduate (PG) programs. Strategically situated near National Highway 16 (NH 16) and the Baramunda Bus Stand, the campus is highly accessible to students traveling from across Bhubaneswar and throughout the state of Odisha.

== History ==
Rajdhani College in Bhubaneswar, Odisha, began its journey in 1973, operating out of the morning shift at Buxi Jagabandhu Bidyadhar (BJB) College to offer Intermediate and Degree courses in Arts. By 1975, the college transitioned into an independent institution, operating from a temporary government facility in Unit-I for fourteen years before relocating to its permanent campus in Baramunda in 1989. Today, the college is affiliated with the Council of Higher Secondary Education (CHSE), Odisha, for its +2 streams, and with Utkal University for its undergraduate and postgraduate programs. Admissions to all programs are strictly merit-based, managed through the centralized e-admission process in compliance with the guidelines set by the Government of Odisha.

== Departments ==
Rajdhani College is a premier government institution in Bhubaneswar, dedicated to excellence in general arts, commerce, and science education. The college currently features the following academic departments for undergraduate (UG) and postgraduate (PG) studies:

- Botany
- Chemistry
- Commerce
- English
- Economics
- Education
- Anthropology
- Geography
- Geology
- History
- Mathematics
- Odia
- Philosophy
- Physics
- Political science
- Sanskrit
- Sociology
- Zoology

== Programs ==
The college is affiliated with the Council of Higher Secondary Education (CHSE), Odisha, for its higher secondary (+2) streams, and with Utkal University for its undergraduate (UG) and postgraduate (PG) programs. The institution offers a comprehensive range of courses across the arts, science, and commerce disciplines:

- Master of Science in Chemistry, Botany, Physics, Zoology, Mathematics
- Master of Arts in Education, Odia, Economics, Political Science, Sociology, English, Sanskrit, History
- Master of Commerce
- Bachelor of Science in Chemistry, Botany, Physics, Zoology, Geology, Mathematics
- Bachelor of Education (B.Ed.)
- Bachelor of Arts in Education, Odia, Economics, Political Science, Sociology, Anthropology, Geography, English, Sanskrit, Philosophy, History
- Bachelor of Commerce
- Self-financing UG courses Bachelor of Computer Applications & Bachelor of Business Administration
- Self-financing PG courses on MBA (Agri-business) and Personnel Management & Industrial Relations (PMIR)
- 10+2 Science
- 10+2 Arts
- 10+2 Commerce
- 10+2 Vocational

== Gallery ==
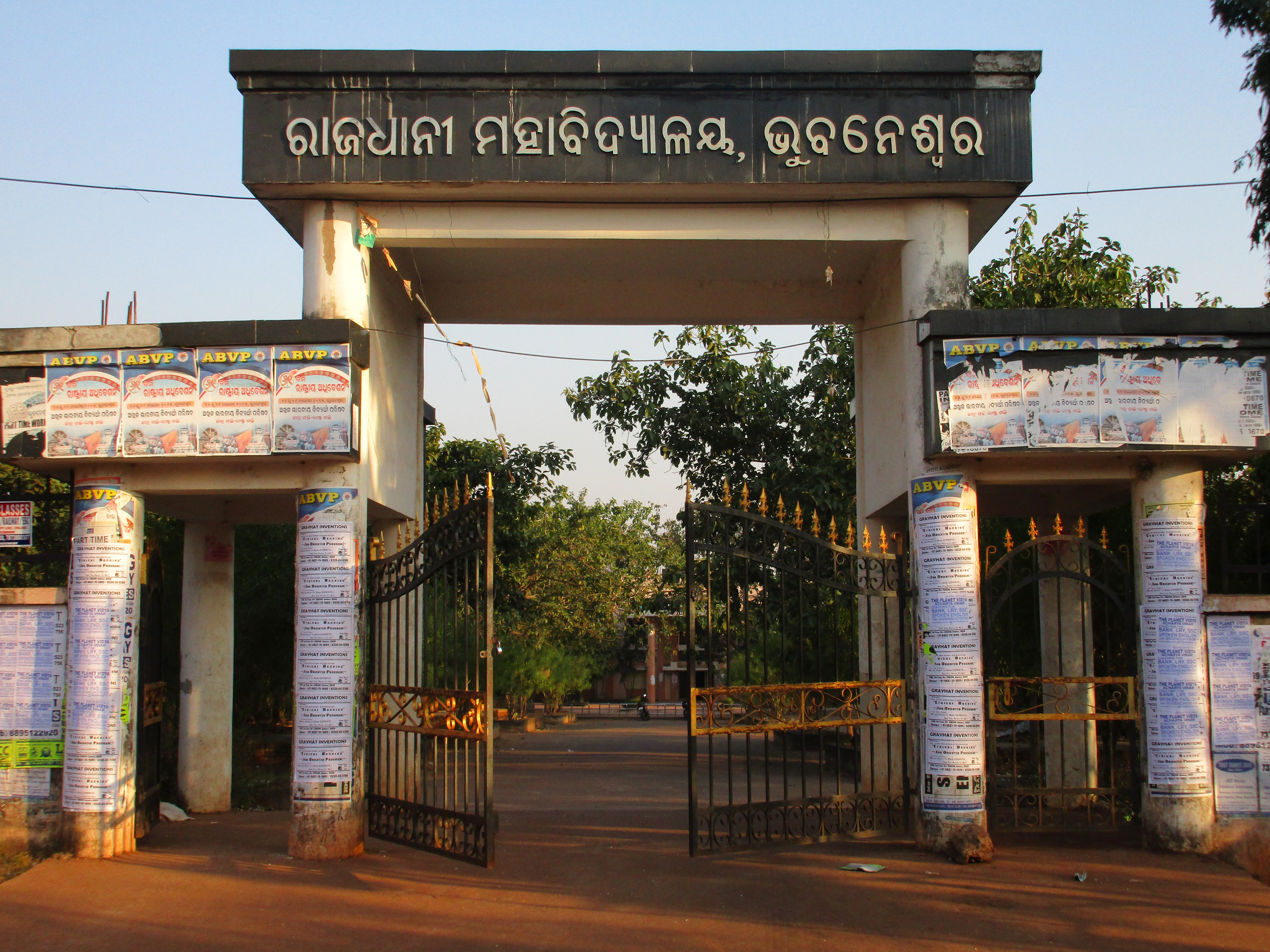
The Rajdhani College Bhubaneswar Main Gate in 2015.

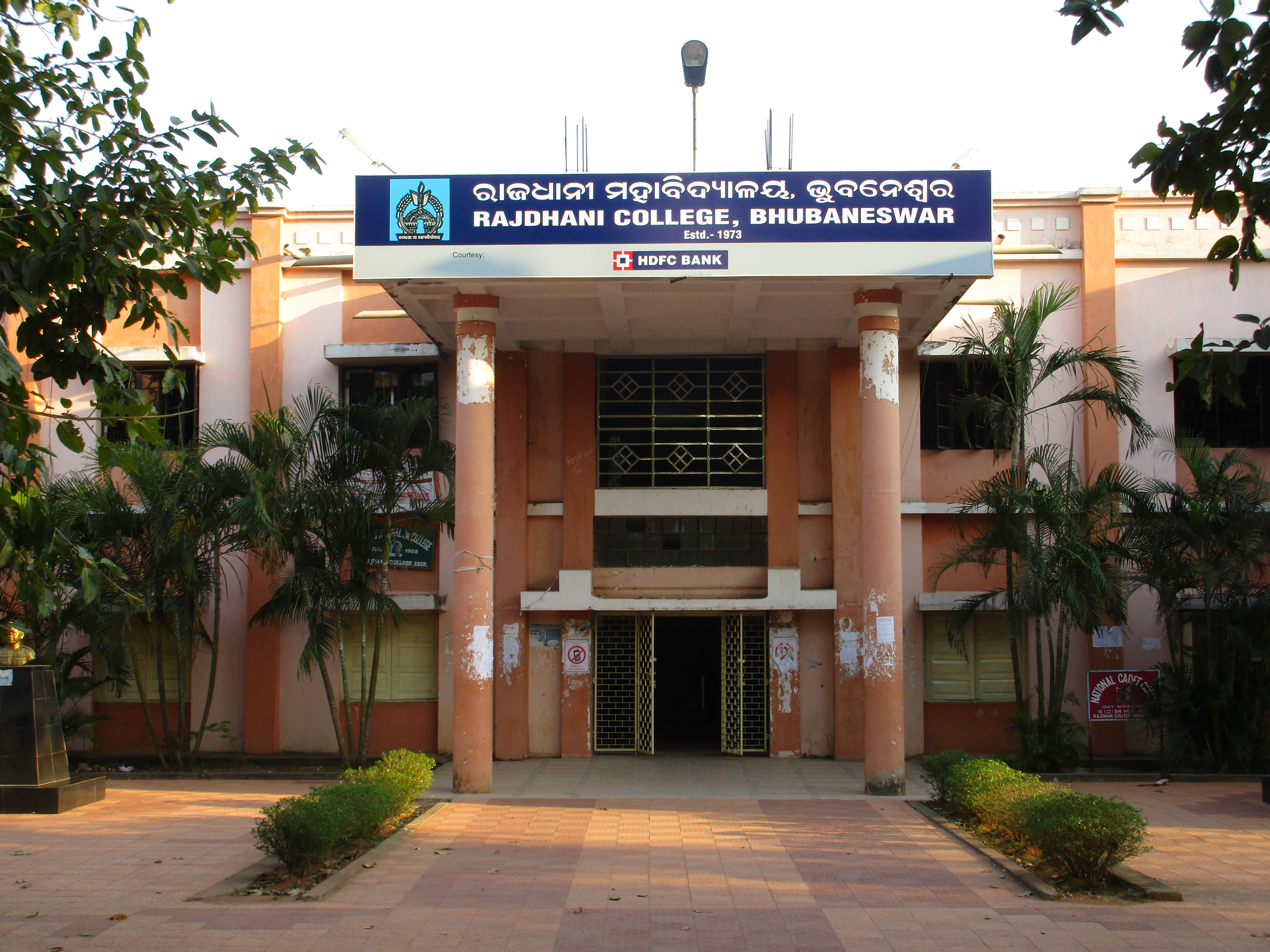
The Rajdhani College Bhubaneswar front side in 2015.

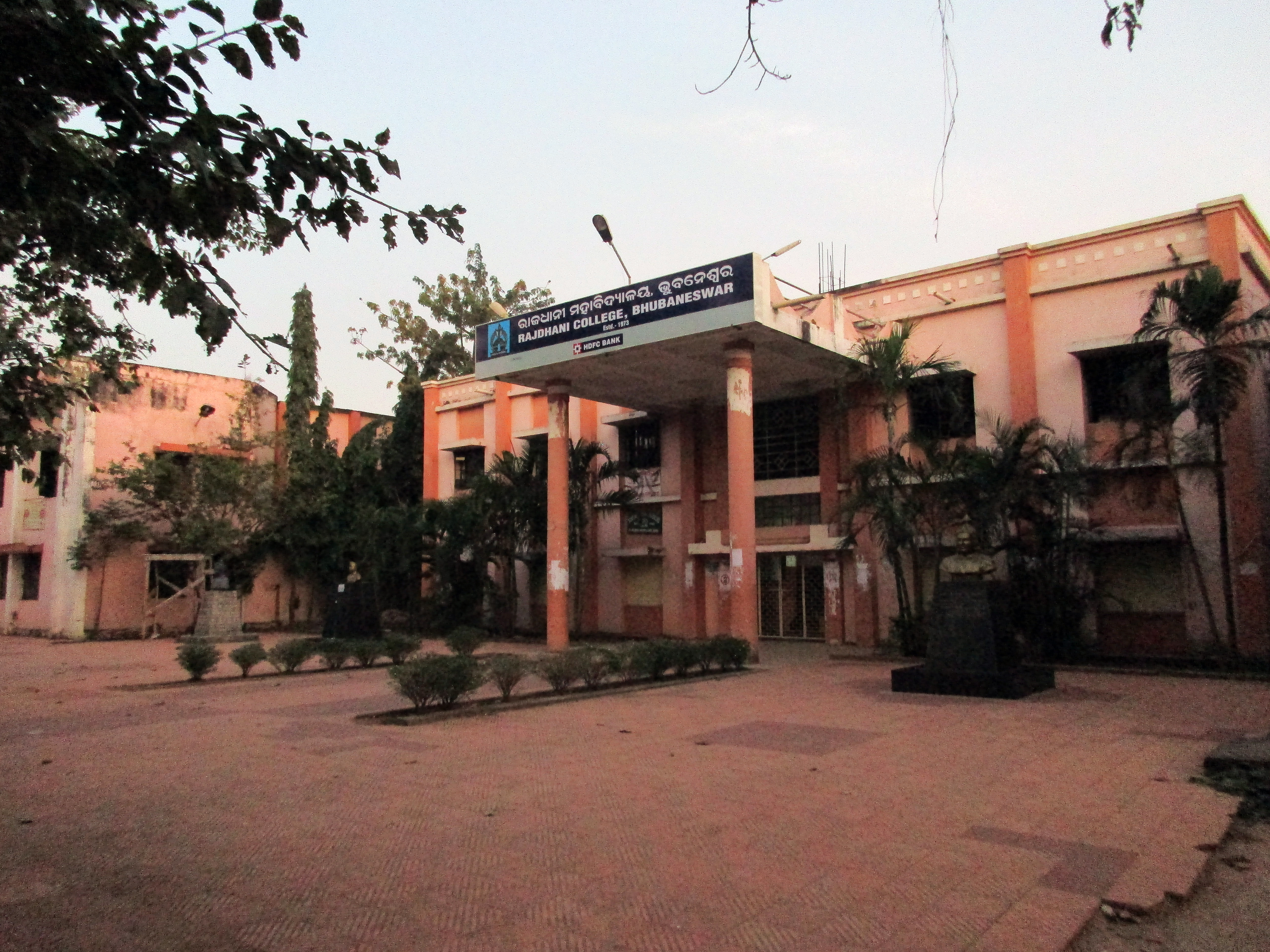
The Rajdhani College Bhubaneswar front side structure in 2015.

== Principals of the College ==
Following is a list of Principals who have led the College after 1975.

The Rajdhani College Bhubaneswar Principal's list in 2015.

- 2018 – present : Lalatendu Keshari Das
- 2014-2018: Jahan Ara Begum
- 2014-2014: A. K. Kar
- 2014-2014: Geetika Patnaik
- 2013-2014: G. C. Nanda
- 2011-2013: S. N. Jena
- 2011-2011: Abhimanyu Bhayan
- 2011-2011: S. N. Jena
- 2010-2011: P. K. Pattanayak
- 2010-2010: A. K. Otta
- 2010-2010: P. K. Pattanayak
- 2009-2010: S. Mohapatra
- 2008-2009: P. K. Pattanayak
- 2008-2008: S. R. Mishra
- 2008-2008: P. K. Pattanayak
- 2008-2009: S. P. Mohanty
- 2006-2008: S. K. Panda
- 2004-2006: S. Baliarsingh
- 2002-2004: M. Kundu
- 2001-2002: R. K. Mohanty
- 1999-2001: B. K. Mishra
- 1999-1999: N. Das
- 1998-1999: S. R. Kanungo
- 1998-1998: S. K. Pattnaik
- 1997-1998: R. C. Rout
- 1997-1998: B. K. Mohapatra
- 1996-1997: D. G. Panda
- 1994-1996: R. K. Mishra
- 1993-1994: P. C. Dash
- 1991-1993: N. K. Rath
- 1990-1991: K. M. Acharya
- 1988-1990: S. K. Acharya
- 1988-1988: S. Das
- 1986-1988: A. K. Meeshraw
- 1986-1986: J. K. Dwivedy
- 1983-1986: S. C. Das
- 1982-1983: N. K. Rath
- 1975-1982: M. Mohapatra

== Notable alumni ==
- Saraju Mohanty, Professor at the University of North Texas, Denton, United States.
- Ananta Narayan Jena, Mayor of the Bhubaneswar Municipal Corporation (BMC) and later as a Member of the Odisha Legislative Assembly (MLA) for Central Bhubaneswar
- Senior Corporate Leadership Contingent
