= A. Maceo Smith =

American journalist

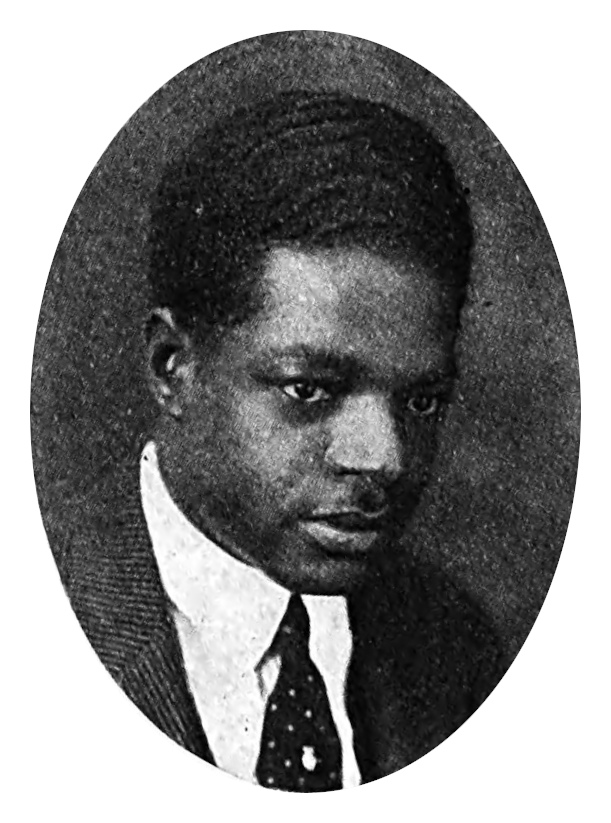
- Smith in 1924
- Born: April 16, 1903; Texarkana, Texas
- Died: December 19, 1977 (aged 74)
- Occupations: Federal civil servant, entrepreneur
- Known for: Civil Rights activist in Dallas, Texas

Antonio Maceo Smith (April 16, 1903 – December 19, 1977) was a civil rights leader in Dallas, Texas, whose years of activism with the National Association for the Advancement of Colored People (NAACP) and other civil rights and community groups led Texans to dub him "Mr. Civil Rights" and "Mr. Organization".

== Early life and education ==
Antonio Maceo Smith was born in Texarkana, Texas, where he attended segregated schools. His parents were Howell and Winnie Smith.

Smith graduated with an AB in 1924 from Fisk University, a historically black university in Nashville, Tennessee, where he would go on to be honored as Alumnus of the Year in 1949. Smith was awarded an MBA at New York University in 1928. He earned further master's degrees in economics and business law at Columbia University.

== Careers in entrepreneurship and public service ==
Smith first owned an advertising agency in New York City, and then a real estate firm in Texarkana. In 1932, he moved to Dallas, where he taught business administration in the segregated Dallas public schools, and published a weekly black newspaper, the Dallas Express.

In 1933, Smith became the first executive secretary of the Dallas Negro Chamber of Commerce, where he spearheaded voter registration drives. He was appointed as the deputy director of the Hall of Negro Life at the Texas Centennial Exposition in 1936, and later that year, wed Fannie Fletcher. Turning from entrepreneurship to public service, in 1937, Smith became an administrative aide in the Federal Housing Administration (FHA). He was appointed regional relations advisor for Region VI in the United States Housing Authority in 1939. He went on to become assistant regional administrator for the United States Department of Housing and Urban Development, and retired in 1972.

== Civil Rights activism and community involvement ==
Smith fought against Texas' white primary system, which disenfranchised nonwhite voters. That campaign led to the landmark U.S. Supreme Court decision in Smith v. Allwright, 321 U.S. 649 (1944), that did away with white primaries nationwide. (Note: The plaintiff in Smith v. Allright was Lonnie E. Smith, not Maceo Smith.) Smith also fought against school segregation in a legal campaign that led to Sweatt v. Painter, 339 U.S. 629 (1950), a case that paved the way for Brown v. Board of Education.

Smith co-chaired the Biracial (Note: later Triracial) Committee for the City of Dallas, where he helped lead the city's desegregation. He served on the NAACP's national board of directors from 1953 until 1957, when he was forced to resign by his FHA supervisors. He was also a leader in the Texas State Negro Chamber of Commerce, the Texas Council of Negro Organizations, the Dallas Urban League, the Texas State Progressive Voters League, the Alpha Phi Alpha fraternity, the Rotary Club of Dallas, the Knights of Pythias of North America, South America, Europe, Asia, Africa and Australia, the New Hope Baptist Church, and at Bishop College.

== Local legacy ==
The A. Maceo Smith High School building and the A. Maceo Smith Federal Building, both in Dallas, are named for Smith. The previous A. Maceo Smith zoned high school was replaced by A. Maceo Smith New Tech High School, now New Tech High School at B.F. Darrell, while Barack Obama Male Leadership Academy at A. Maceo Smith occupies the former Smith campus.

== See also ==
- History of the African Americans in Dallas-Fort Worth
