= Indian Americans in Dallas–Fort Worth =

Substantial Indian American community

Indians in Dallas–Fort Worth
Total population
- 235,642; 3% of DFW's total population (2021)

Regions with significant populations
- Dallas, Richardson, Plano, Frisco, Allen, Carrollton, Mesquite, Irving, Fort Worth

Languages
- Hindi, Gujarati, Kannada, Konkani, Telugu, Sindhi, Tamil, Punjabi, Malayalam, Bengali, Languages of India

Religion
- Majority: Hinduism; Minority: Sikhism • Islam • Jainism • Christianity • Buddhism

Related ethnic groups
- Indians in San Francisco, Indians in Chicago, Indians in New York, Indians in Detroit

The Dallas–Fort Worth (DFW) area has one of the largest Indian American populations in the United States, comprising over 235,000 individuals, or roughly 3% of the metro area's total population. First settling in the area as doctors, engineers, and skilled professionals in the medical field, the community has expanded to include information-technology specialists and those in the higher educational realm, including both students and professors. Through multiple waves of immigration periods and beginning families in the region, the Indian population in the DFW area has more than doubled from 2000 to 2010. Recently, there has been an influx of Indians in Frisco and Allen. Asian Indians make up the majority of the population in many subdivisions in Frisco.

== History ==
The Dallas-Fort Worth area is home to one of the oldest Indian American communities in Texas. Despite harsh immigration laws being passed in the early and mid 1900s, such as the Immigration Act of 1917 and the 1946 Luce-Celler Act, Indian immigrants, mainly skilled farmers from North India seeking agricultural work came to the region. By 1930, 49 Indians lived in Texas as a whole, many of whom resided in Dallas.

After the 1965 Immigration Act led passed and the quota system for immigrants based on country of origin was removed, a swell of Indian immigration to Dallas ensued. With skilled workers being favored, Indians adept in high technology, engineering, energy, manufacturing, and medical fields began clustering within Dallas county. Moreover, the late 1960s and 70s saw an influx of Indian women immigrating to the city, particularly nurses from South India following a national shortage post the Vietnam War.

A second wave of more recent immigrants arrived starting in the 1990s with H1-B visas granted for jobs within the domestic workforce. Indians currently claim 41% of the H1-B visas granted nationally and many have been recruited this way by information-technology firms in the Las Colinas and Richardson areas. Moreover, beginning in the 1980s, many Indians have came to Dallas to pursue advanced degrees at higher education universities like Southern Methodist University (SMU) and the University of Texas at Dallas (UTD). The business school at UTD, Jindal School of Management, is named after Indian politician Naveen Jindal.

By 2023 Frisco had Diwali and Holi celebrations, as well as the Karya Siddhi Hanuman Temple, of Hinduism; the temple has Texas's largest prayer hall of that particular religion.

== Demography ==
From 2000 to 2010 the Asian Indian community of Dallas-Fort Worth more than doubled, with 106,964 Asian Indians residing in Collin, Dallas, Denton, Rockwall, and Tarrant counties.

Estimated and census population and average annual growth rate
Year	Pop.	±% p.a.
2010	106,694	—
2015	145,000	+6.33%
2020	212,486	+7.94%
2021	235,642	+10.90%

According to 2021 estimates, the Asian Indian community increased to roughly 235,642 people, with the following counties having the largest populations:

Collin County - 100,027 (9.01% of total populace)

Dallas County - 69,499 (2.69% of total populace)

Denton County - 40,286 (4.28% of total populace)

Tarrant County - 22,993 (1.08% of total populace)

== Culture ==
In 2012 there were 90 Indian restaurants within a 40-mile radius of Dallas.

== Notable people ==
This includes people of Indian ancestry (post-partition India) living in or from the Dallas-Fort Worth metroplex:

- Ravi Batra, bestselling author and economist
- Rashad Hussain, attorney, diplomat, and professor
- Vistasp Karbhari, former president of the University of Texas at Arlington, (2013-2020)
- Pankaj Jain, former Associate Professor at the University of North Texas, (2010-2020)
- Thirunavukkarasu Kumaran, cricketer and former coach of the national under-19 team
- Sanjay Lal, former wide receivers coach for the Dallas Cowboys
- Manny Malhotra, former NHL hockey player for the Dallas Stars
- Shelley Malil, film and TV actor
- Faris McReynolds, painter and musician
- Saraju Mohanty, professor of computer science and engineering at the University of North Texas
- K. R. Rao, professor at University of Texas at Arlington
- Mehul Shah, actor, director, writer, and producer
- Akaash Singh, actor and stand-up comedian
- Tiya Sircar, actress
- Paul Varghese, comedian who appeared on Last Comic Standing
