= The Dallas Weekly =

American newspaper in Dallas, Texas

- Owner: Patrick J. Washington
- Founded: 1954
- Language: English
- Website: dallasweekly.com

The Dallas Weekly is a newspaper headquartered in Dallas, Texas. It is one of the major Dallas-Fort Worth black newspapers. It was first published in 1954.

From 1954 to 1985 the publisher was founder Tony Davis, from 1985 to 2018 James Washington was publisher. Patrick Washington, James Washington's son, is now CEO/Co-Publisher.

== See also ==
- History of African Americans in Dallas-Fort Worth
