= A. Maceo Smith High School =

School in Texas, United States

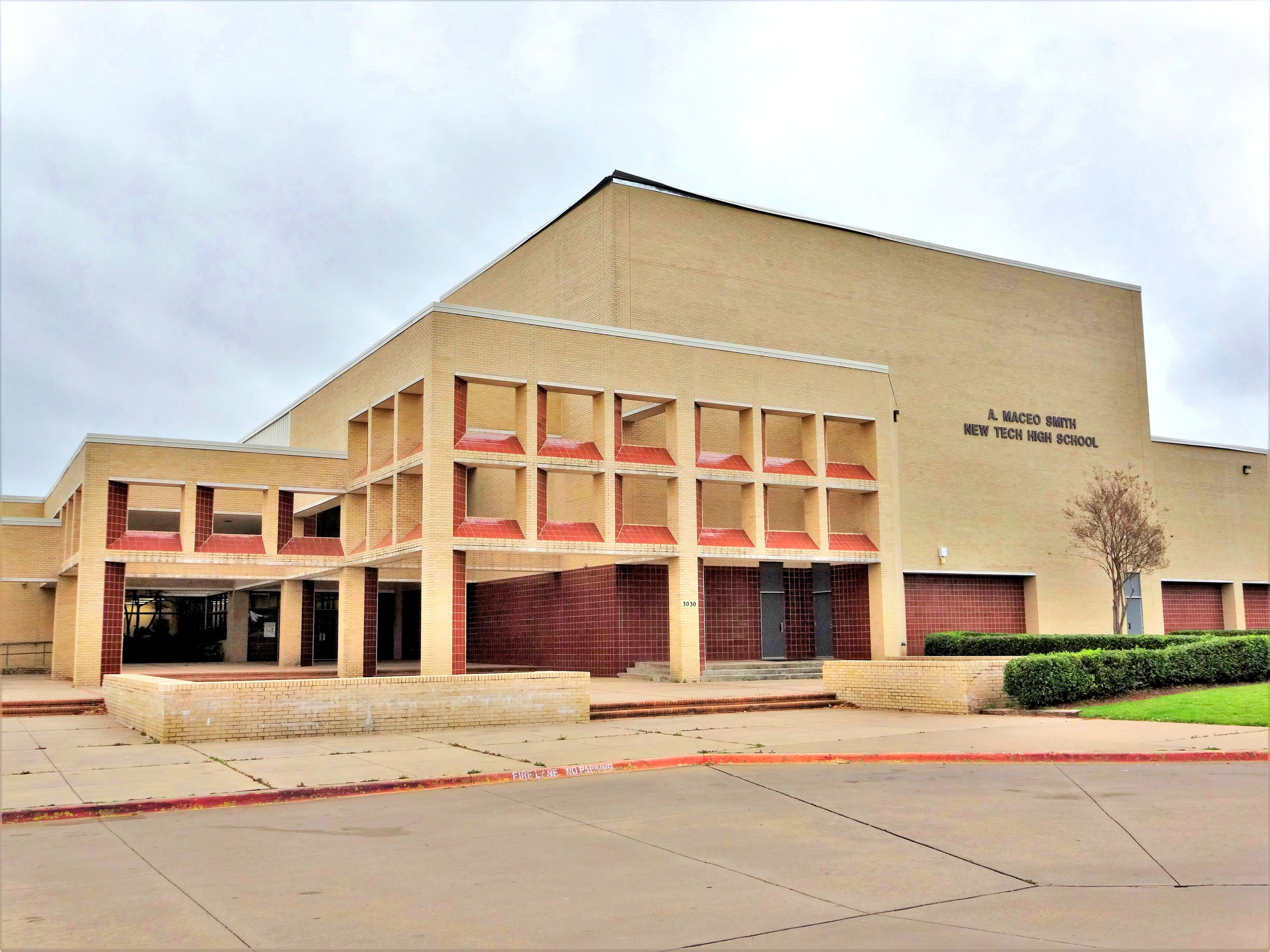
- The former A. Maceo Smith campus as A. Maceo Smith New Tech High School, in Dallas, Texas

Location
- 3030 Stag Road; Dallas, Dallas County, Texas 75241; United States; 32°41′31″N 96°45′54″W

Information
- Funding type: Public
- Opened: 1978
- Status: closed
- Closed: 2011
- School district: Dallas Independent School District
- Grades: 9-12
- Colors: Royal Blue and Silver
- Mascot: Falcon
- Communities served: District 5
- Feeder schools: Sarah Zumwalt Middle School
- Website: Official Website

A. Maceo Smith High School was a four-year public high school serving grades 9-12 in the Oak Cliff area of Dallas, Texas (USA). It was part of the Dallas Independent School District. It was replaced by A. Maceo Smith New Tech High School in 2011, and in 2018 Barack Obama Male Leadership Academy began to occupy the campus.

The school was named for Antonio Maceo Smith (1903–1977), a pioneer civil rights leader in Dallas.

== History ==
Originally located in the Nolan Estes Educational Plaza, A. Maceo Smith HS was moved in 1989 due to complaints about the unsuitability of the physical plant at the plaza, a former shopping center. After the school moved, the attendance boundaries between Smith and South Oak Cliff High School shifted, with students zoned to Stone Middle School and Zumwalt Middle School, except for students also zoned to Bushman Elementary, moving from SOC to Smith, and students zoned to Storey Middle School, except for those who began their educations at Marshall and Oliver elementaries, would be zoned to SOC.

After the closing of the Wilmer-Hutchins Independent School District, Smith took in students from the former school district boundary and continued to serve former WHISD areas until its repurposing.

For several years, A. Maceo Smith was a Texas Education Agency "unacceptable" ranked school. In 2011 the district converted A. Maceo Smith into a technology magnet, A. Maceo Smith New Tech High School. The majority of students in its attendance zone were reassigned to Wilmer-Hutchins High School, and the previous Smith football team mostly became the new Wilmer-Hutchins team. Some areas of the former Smith zone were reassigned to South Oak Cliff. Since Smith was reconstituted as a magnet school, it avoided the possibility of the TEA reconstituting or closing the school itself due to its poor performance as a zoned school.

Sarah Zumwalt Middle School temporarily shared the Smith building with New Tech while the permanent Zumwalt campus was being fixed. Barack Obama Male Leadership Academy, previously at the B.F. Darrell campus, began occupying the former Smith campus in 2018, while New Tech moved to B.F. Darrell.

== Students and programs ==
Smith's students were predominantly African-American and from low income families. Local companies such as Frito Lay worked with students at Paul Quinn College to provide tutoring for Smith students and arrange motivational visits from the NFL's Dallas Cowboys and the NBA's Dallas Mavericks. Another program, Young Men of Distinction, provided mentoring and leadership development to male students.

== Smith in the news ==
The school made the news around the world in 2002 when alligators, poisonous snakes, bobcats, coyotes, and other dangerous animals took over the practice football field after beavers dammed a nearby waterway during the summer.

On May 25, 2007, the Dallas school board voted 6–0 to uphold the firing of Smith principal Dwain Govan over spending on his DISD credit card, in an investigation that indicated 93 district employees had made questionable purchases or in other ways had abused the program. As of the board's vote — from which one board member abstained out of concerns the card's rules had been ill-defined — Govan had yet to account for purchases that included two sets of gold-plated flatware, four portable DVD players, four digital cameras, a flat-screen TV, a printer, $8,747 in Wal-Mart gift cards and approximately $4,650 in restaurant gift cards. A Texas Education Agency hearing examiner recommended upholding the proposal for Govan's termination, but noted that there had been no accusation or evidence that he took district property for his personal use.

Around March 2008, while Dallas ISD prepared for a bond election, some parents felt concern that the district may move the students at Smith to a school in the area formerly controlled by Wilmer-Hutchins ISD.

== School uniforms ==
When it was a zoned school, Smith required school uniforms.
