= Saraju Mohanty =

Indian-American computer scientist

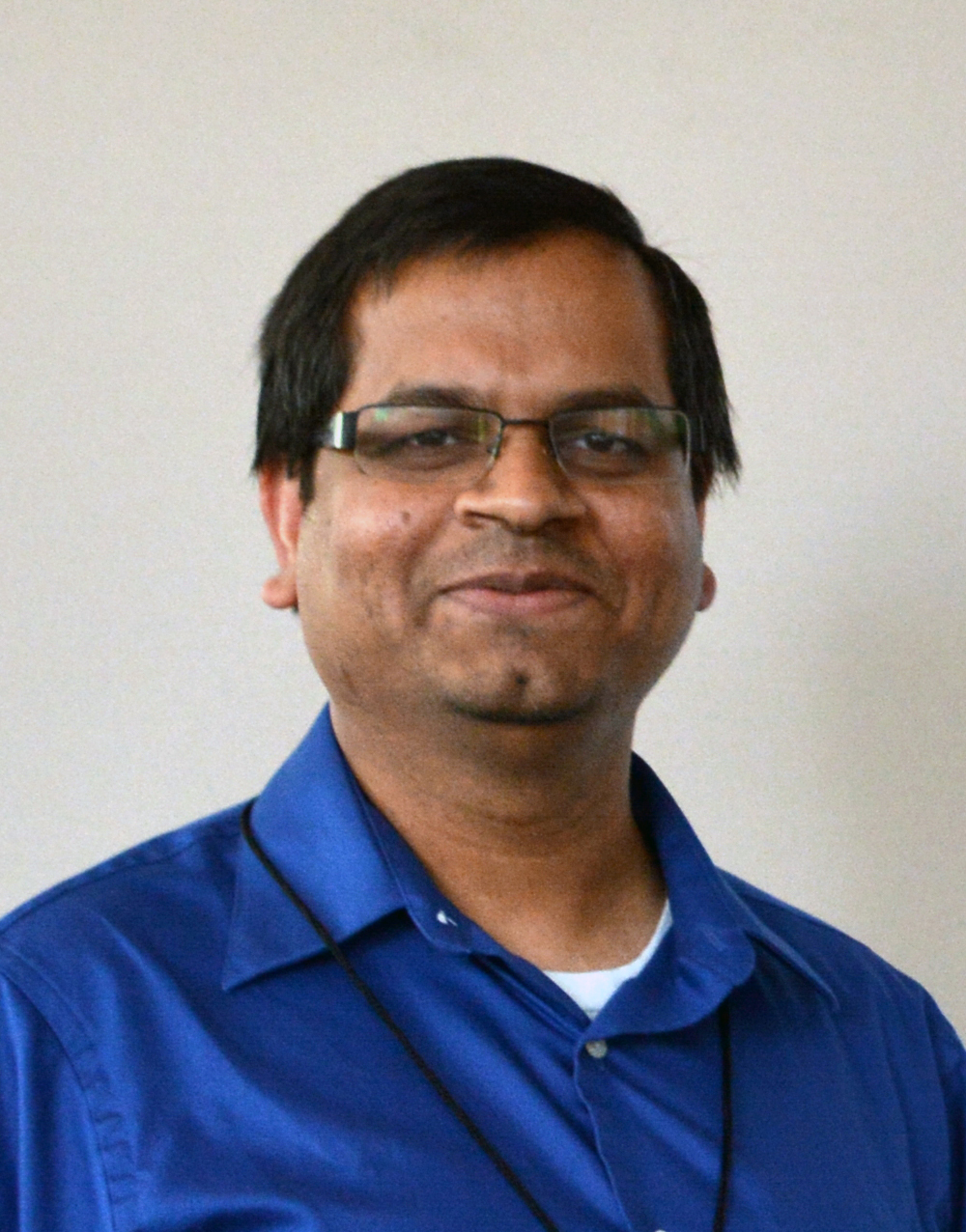
- Mohanty in 2012
- Born: Odisha, India
- Education: University of South Florida (USF), Tampa; Indian Institute of Science (IISc), Bangalore; Orissa University of Agriculture and Technology (OUAT), Bhubaneswar
- Occupations: professor, author, scientist, Editor, computer engineer
- Known for: Hardware-assisted electronic system security, secure digital camera, mixed-signal systems, nanoelectronics systems, metamodeling, design for x, high-level synthesis, energy-efficient electronic system design
- Notable work: Nanoelectronic Mixed-Signal System Design, McGraw-Hill, 2015, ISBN 978-0071825719
- Awards: IEEE-CS-TCVLSI Distinguished Leadership Award in 2018 Glorious India Award in 2017; Society for Technical Communication (STC) Award of Merit in 2017; PROSE Award for best textbook in Physical Sciences & Mathematics in 2016; Toulouse Scholars Award from UNT in 2016–17; IEEE Distinguished Lecturer since 2017 President's Scout Award in 1988
- Website: smohanty.org

Saraju Mohanty is an Indian-American professor of the Department of Computer Science and Engineering at the University of North Texas in Denton, Texas. He is the founding director of the Smart Electronic Systems Laboratory (SESL) there. He has also served in leadership roles in international professional organizations and academic journals, including the IEEE Computer Society and IEEE Consumer Electronics Society. He is the founding Dean of Artificial Intelligence Technology Institute (AiTI) at the SRM University-AP.

Mohanty is a researcher in the areas of "smart electronics for smart cities/villages", "smart healthcare", "smart agriculture", "application-Specific things for efficient edge computing", and "methodologies for digital and mixed-signal hardware". He has made significant research contributions to security by design (SbD) for electronic systems, hardware-assisted security (HAS) and protection, high-level synthesis of digital signal processing (DSP) hardware, and mixed-signal integrated circuit computer-aided design and electronic design automation.

Mohanty has been the editor-in-chief (EiC) of the IEEE Consumer Electronics Magazine during 2016-2021. He has held the Chair of the IEEE Computer Society's Technical Committee on Very Large Scale Integration during 2014-2018. He holds 6 granted patents in the areas of his research, and has published 600 research articles and 5 books.

== Education ==
Saraju Mohanty started his schooling at Lodhachua, Nayagarh, Odisha. After graduating from Badagada Government High School, Bhubaneswar in 1988. Mohanty completed a 10+2 Science degree from Rajdhani College, Bhubaneswar in 1990. He received his bachelor's degree in electrical engineering from the College of Engineering and Technology, Bhubaneswar, Orissa University of Agriculture and Technology, in 1995.

Mohanty in a Scout Camp in 1988 with high school classmates

In 1999 Mohanty completed a master's degree in engineering in Systems Science and Automation from the Indian Institute of Science in Bangalore, India. His thesis mentors at IISc were Professor K. R. Ramakrishnan and Professor Mohan Kankanhalli (IEEE Fellow) with whom he co-authored his first peer-reviewed paper.

Mohanty with K. R. Ramakrishnan, Mohan Kankanhalli, and Nasir Memon at the IEEE International Conference on Multimedia and Expo (ICME) 2000 at New York City

Mohanty earned a PhD in computer engineering from the University of South Florida in 2003. His PhD mentor was Professor Nagarajan Ranganathan (IEEE Fellow and AAAS Fellow).

== Scientific contributions ==
=== Smart Healthcare ===
Mohanty's research in smart healthcare has focused on Internet of Medical Things (IoMT), healthcare Cyber-physical systems (H-CPS), involving wearable devices, AI, and security and privacy. His work includes iKardo, an intelligent ECG device for automatic identification of critical heartbeats; MyWear, a smart garment for continuous vital-sign monitoring; SaYoPillow, a privacy-assured IoMT framework for stress monitoring; and iGLU, a secure non-invasive glucose monitoring and automatic insulin-delivery system. His research has also addressed cardiovascular disease prediction using ECG, seizure detection from EEG signals, and AI-based diagnosis using multi-channel EEG. His work has additionally examined security and privacy in wearable and implantable medical devices and secure architectures for connected healthcare systems.

=== Smart Agriculture ===
Mohanty's research in smart agriculture has contributed to the development of Internet-of-Agro-Things (IoAT) and agriculture cyber-physical systems (A-CPS) that integrate IoT, artificial intelligence, machine learning, computer vision, edge computing, and intelligent sensing. His early work included gCrop, an Internet-of-Leaf-Things system for monitoring crop growth, and dCrop, a deep-learning framework for crop disease prediction. His sCrop system introduced a solar-powered IoAT device for automatic plant-disease prediction, crop selection, and irrigation, combining sensor nodes, imaging, convolutional neural networks, and mobile visualization for sustainable agriculture. His subsequent eCrop framework addressed automatic crop-damage estimation using a convolutional Siamese neural network and was designed to support automated agricultural insurance claim assessment. More recent works have extended this research to plant-disease detection and damage estimation, identification of disease hotspots using graph-based methods, disease-severity estimation using graph neural networks, and autonomous weed management through the WeedOut framework. His broader work has also examined the architecture, technologies, applications, and challenges of smart agriculture and has contributed to comprehensive frameworks for integrating IoT, AI, sensing, and intelligent automation into agricultural systems.

=== Smart cities and smart villages ===
Mohanty's research has addressed the use of Internet of things (IoT), cyber-physical systems (CPS), edge computing, sensing, communication networks, and data analytics in smart cities and smart villages. His 2016 article, Everything You Wanted to Know about Smart Cities: The Internet of Things is the Backbone, examined smart-city infrastructure and the use of IoT and data-driven technologies in areas including transportation, energy, healthcare, and other urban services.

His subsequent work extended the Smart city concept to Smart village, with emphasis on the technological constraints of rural environments. The proposed IoT-based smart-village architectures considered applications including smart agriculture, healthcare, education, energy, water management, waste management, weather monitoring, and livestock management. The work examined low-power and long-range communication technologies, for connecting geographically distributed sensing and computing resources.

The energy requirements and sustainability of IoT-based smart cities and villages have been another focus of this work. Mohanty and collaborators examined the energy demands of distributed IoT devices and the limitations of conventional battery-powered sensing nodes, including the need for battery replacement in large-scale deployments. These works considered energy harvesting, renewable energy sources, energy-efficient sensing and computing, and security-by-design in energy-harvesting technologies as approaches for developing sustainable and continuously powered IoT infrastructures for smart cities and villages.

A specific computing architecture investigated for smart villages is Collaborative Edge Computing (CEC). Mohanty and collaborators examined collaboration among resource-constrained edge devices to share computational resources for smart-village applications, reducing reliance on centralized cloud infrastructure. The work identified applications including smart agriculture, water management, and healthcare.

The energy-aware approach was subsequently applied to smart-city street-light management. The bSlight system is a battery-less, energy-autonomous street-light management system using a supercapacitor, energy harvesting, low-power electronics, sensors, and LoRa communication. The prototype was designed for real-time monitoring and control of LED street lighting while reducing the energy required for the management electronics. In a real-world testbed, the system operated at an low average power consumption.

Together, these studies address different layers of smart-community infrastructure: IoT architectures and applications, distributed Edge computing, Energy harvesting and sustainability, and autonomous energy-efficient infrastructure. The smart-city and smart-village work also connects with Mohanty's research on Smart agriculture, smart healthcare, Security by design, and energy-efficient computing.

=== Security by Design (SbD) ===
Mohanty's research has made contributions to Security by Design (SbD) or Secure by design, a design paradigm in which security and privacy are incorporated into electronic and cyber-physical systems from the beginning of the design process rather than being retrofitted after deployment. He introduced the Secure Digital Camera (SDC) in 2004 as an early implementation of hardware-assisted security and SbD, integrating security and intellectual-property protection directly into sensing hardware. The SDC was designed to provide real-time protection of multimedia information at the point of capture and could serve as a trustworthy sensing node in Internet of Things (IoT) systems. Applications included secure video surveillance, digital video broadcasting, electronic passports, and identity-card processing. His research on secure digital cameras subsequently extended to secure multimedia systems, digital rights management, and hardware implementations of digital watermarking.

A related research direction has been digital watermarking and intellectual-property protection. Mohanty's master's research at the Indian Institute of Science focused on digital image watermarking, and his subsequent research developed hardware architectures for visible and invisible watermarking, secure JPEG encoding, real-time multimedia protection, and low-power watermarking. His work included VLSI implementations of watermarking algorithms and architectures for protecting digital media and hardware intellectual property while considering energy and implementation costs.

==== Hardware-Assisted Security ====
Mohanty's SbD research subsequently expanded into Hardware-Assisted Security (HAS) for electronic systems, IoT, and cyber-physical systems. His work has examined protection of hardware intellectual property, Physical unclonable function (PUFs), hardware Trojans, secure authentication, trusted hardware, and security mechanisms for resource-constrained connected devices. His works IP Core Protection and Hardware-Assisted Security for Consumer Electronics examines hardware-assisted approaches to IP-core protection and security, including watermarking, physical unclonable functions, and protection mechanisms for consumer-electronics hardware.

His later work extended HAS and SbD to IoT and cyber-physical systems, including protection against hardware Trojans and security mechanisms for devices operating at the edge of IoT systems. In Eternal-Thing, his research addressed analog hardware-Trojan resilience in IoT devices, reflecting his broader approach of integrating security mechanisms into the hardware architecture of connected systems rather than relying solely on software-based protection.

Another research direction has involved PUF-based hardware security and authentication. PUFs use inherent manufacturing variations in integrated circuits to generate device-specific electronic fingerprints, providing a mechanism for device authentication without permanently storing conventional secret keys. Mohanty's PUFchain research integrated PUF-based hardware authentication with distributed-ledger technologies for IoT and Internet-of-Medical-Things (IoMT) devices. The subsequent PUFchain 3.0 work integrated PUFs, blockchain, and IOTA Tangle to provide device and data security for healthcare cyber-physical systems, explicitly applying a decentralized hardware-software SbD approach to IoMT security.

==== Security and Privacy by Design ====
Mohanty has also advocated Security and Privacy by Design (SPbD) for the Internet of Everything (IoE), arguing that security and privacy should be considered during the initial design cycle of cyber-physical systems rather than added later. His work has applied this principle to smart healthcare, IoT, and other connected systems in which sensing, computation, communication, and actuation are increasingly integrated. This approach combines hardware security, trustworthy sensing, authentication, privacy protection, and secure communication as architectural elements of smart electronic systems.

His later research has applied these principles to healthcare cyber-physical systems. For example, PUFchain 3.0 combines PUF-based hardware identity with blockchain and distributed-ledger mechanisms to protect medical devices and sensitive healthcare data, illustrating the extension of SbD from individual hardware components to complete secure cyber-physical architectures.

=== Distributed Ledger Technology and Blockchain Applications ===
Mohanty's research has examined the integration of Blockchain and distributed ledger technologies into the Internet of Things (IoT), Internet of Medical Things (IoMT), and cyber-physical systems. His research has addressed security, privacy, authentication, access control, and data provenance in distributed applications. Mohanty developed EasyChain, a highly scalable, IoT-oriented blockchain architecture based on Proof of Authentication (PoAh), integrating cryptographic authentication, trust management, and access control to support robust and energy-efficient authentication in resource-constrained IoT networks.

One research direction combines physical unclonable functions (PUFs), blockchain, and distributed ledger technologies for hardware-assisted authentication and secure data sharing. The PUFchain series of frameworks explores the use of PUF-based hardware security with distributed ledgers. PUFchain 2.0 addressed device and data security in smart healthcare, while PUFchain 3.0 examined hardware-assisted authentication in healthcare cyber-physical systems. Subsequent work on PUFchain 4.0 investigated the integration of a PUF-based trusted platform module (TPM) into a distributed ledger for security-by-design in IoT systems.

His collaborative research has also examined blockchain-based security and privacy in healthcare systems. The Fortified-Chain framework addressed security, privacy, and access control in the Internet of Medical Things, and its subsequent version, Fortified-Chain 2.0, investigated an intelligent blockchain-based framework for decentralized smart healthcare. Other related studies addressed blockchain-based contact tracing in healthcare cyber-physical systems through CoviChain and digital asset access control in e-health systems through DAAC.

Other applications investigated in his research include pharmaceutical supply-chain management, agricultural data management, and energy trading. PharmaChain examined blockchain-based mechanisms for reducing counterfeit risks in pharmaceutical supply chains, while PharmaChain 3.0 investigated drug tracking and tracing through blockchain-integrated product serialization. CroPAiD examined distributed storage and ledger-based information protection in agricultural cyber-physical systems, while W-DaM investigated blockchain-as-a-service for weather data management in smart agriculture. His collaborative work has also explored blockchain-based secure energy trading using vehicle-to-grid mutual authentication.

=== Deepfake Detection and Mitigation ===
Mohanty's collaborative research has examined machine-learning techniques for detecting Deepfake images and videos, particularly in the context of facial recognition, digital identity, and smart-city applications. Early work investigated machine-learning-based detection of deepfake videos in social media using key-frame extraction and visual features.

Another research direction addressed deep-morphed facial images that can compromise automated facial recognition systems. A convolutional neural network-based method was proposed for detecting manipulated facial images in resource-constrained Internet of Things environments. This work received a Best Paper Award at the 2021 OITS International Conference on Information Technology. Related work introduced iFace, a deepfake-resilient digital identification framework for smart cities.

Subsequent work explored hardware-assisted approaches to deepfake mitigation. PUFshield investigated the use of physical unclonable functions (PUFs) for facial-feature attestation, while BlockShield examined a trusted platform module-integrated blockchain framework for protecting against deepfakes.

In 2024, Mohanty also co-authored a study examining generative artificial intelligence, deepfakes, and large language models.

=== Contributions to high-level synthesis of digital signal processing (DSP) hardware ===
Mohanty has worked to high-level synthesis (HLS) or architecture-level synthesis of digital signal processing (DSP) hardware. His methods address energy consumption and power fluctuation in DSP hardware which are heart of consumer electronic systems such that battery life and battery efficiency increases. His nanoelectronic-based High-level synthesis techniques addresses the issue of process variations, the primary issue of nanoelectronic technology, during the high-level synthesis itself before the digital design moves to the detailed and lower levels of design abstractions, such as logic-level or transistor-level.

=== Contributions to analog electronics and mixed-signal circuits ===
Mohanty has worked on design space exploration and optimization of analog/mixed-signal system on a chip (AMS-SoC) which is essentially the technology representation of a consumer electronics such as a smart mobile phone. The key feature of these design flows is the need for only two manual layout (or physical design) iterations which saves significant design effort. These fast design flows rely on accurate metamodels of the analog and mixed-signal circuit components. This research advances the state-of-the art in Design for Excellence (DfX) or Design for X, such as Design for Variability (DfV) and Design for Cost (DfC).

== Selected editor and conference chair positions ==
Saraju Mohanty receiving IEEE-CS-TCVLSI Distinguished Leadership Award 2018 for services to the IEEE, and to the VLSI research community at ISVLSI 2018 on July 10, 2018, at Hong Kong from ISVLSI 2018 General Chair Wei Zhang and Program Chair Hai Helen Li

- Editor-in-chief of the IEEE Consumer electronics Magazine (MCE).
- Founding editor-in-chief of the VLSI Circuits and Systems Letter, IEEE-CS TCVLSI.
- Steering committee member, IEEE Transactions on Big Data (TBD), 2018—present.
- Associate editor, IEEE Transactions on Computer-Aided Design of Integrated Circuits and Systems (TCAD)
- Associate editor, ACM Journal on Emerging Technologies in Computing Systems (JETC)
- Associate editor, IEEE Transactions on Nanotechnology (TNANO)
- Associate editor, IET Circuits, Devices & Systems Journal (CDS)
- Steering Committee Chair, IEEE International Symposium on Smart Electronic Systems (iSES)
- Steering Committee vice-chair, IEEE-CS Symposium on VLSI (ISVLSI)
- Steering Committee vice-chair, OITS International Conference on Information Technology (OCIT)
- General Chair, IEEE International Conference on Consumer Electronics (ICCE), January 12–14, 2018, Las Vegas, USA.
- General Chair, IFIP International Internet of Things Conference (IFIP-IoT), November 2--3, 2023, DFW Metroplex, USA.

Saraju Mohanty receiving IEEE Consumer Electronics society Outstanding Service Award in 2020 leadership contributions to the IEEE Consumer Electronics society at ICCE 2020 on January 6, 2020, at Las Vegas from ICCE 2020 General Chair Wen-Chung Kao

== Awards ==
- Fulbright Specialist Award by U.S. Department of State's Bureau of Educational and Cultural Affairs and World Learning in 2021.
- IEEE Consumer Electronics Society Chester Sall Award in 2020 for the Second place best paper in the IEEE Transactions on Consumer Electronics in the year 2018.
- IEEE Consumer Electronics Society Outstanding Service Award for 2019 for leadership contributions to the IEEE Consumer Electronics society.
- IEEE-CS-TCVLSI Distinguished Leadership Award for outstanding services to the IEEE and to the VLSI research community in 2018.
- The PROSE Award for best Textbook in Physical Sciences & Mathematics category from the Association of American Publishers (AAP) in 2016.
- The UNT Toulouse Scholars Award for outstanding scholarship and teaching achievements in 2016–2017.
- Best Paper Award at the OITS/IEEE International Conference on Information Technology (OCIT), 2023.
- Ranked among top 2% faculty around the world in Computer Science and Engineering discipline as per the standardized citation metric adopted by the Public Library of Science Biology journal.
- Glorious India Award – Rich and Famous NRIs of America in 2017 for his contributions to the discipline.

== Research rankings and bibliometric indicators ==
Mohanty's research has been included in several field-specific bibliometric rankings. His Google Scholar h-index is 69 and i10-index is 345 with 20,000 citations with top cited researcher in Smart Electronics, Smart Healthcare, Smart Agriculture and Security-by-Design. The 2026 edition of Scholarly Index ranks him #3 worldwide in Hardware and Architecture and #5 worldwide in Physical Unclonable Functions (PUFs) and Hardware Security for the 2021–2025 period, based on field and topic specific bibliometric impact measures. ScholarGPS ranks him #1 worldwide in Consumer Electronics. The 2026 Science-Wide Author Databases of Standardized Citation Indicators, developed using Scopus data which is associated with the global top 2% of scientists database, ranks him #44 worldwide in Computer Hardware and Architecture for career impact and #13 worldwide for 2025 impact in the subfield.
