= Chipita Rodriguez =

Executed by the state of Texas (C.S.A.) in 1863

- Born: Josefa Rodriguez; December 30, 1799; San Patricio, Nuevo Santander, Viceroyalty of New Spain, Spanish Empire
- Died: November 13, 1863 (aged 63); San Patricio, Texas, U.S.
- Cause of death: Execution by hanging
- Other name: "Chipita"
- Conviction: Murder (posthumously exonerated)
- Penalty: Death by hanging

Josefa "Chipita" Rodriguez (December 30, 1799 – November 13, 1863) was convicted of murder and hanged in San Patricio County, Texas, at the age of 63. More than a century later, on June 13, 1985, the Texas Legislature passed a resolution noting that Rodriguez did not receive a fair trial. She has been the subject of two operas, numerous books, newspaper articles, and magazine accounts.

== Trial and execution ==
Rodriguez was reportedly born December 30, 1799, in what was then the Spanish province of Nuevo Santander within the Viceroyalty of New Spain. She was a woman from the South Texas town of San Patricio who furnished travelers with meals and a cot on the porch of her lean-to on the Nueces River. She was accused of robbing and murdering a trader named John Savage with an axe. However, the $600 of gold stolen from him was found down river, where Savage's body was discovered in a burlap bag. She and Juan Silvera (who was possibly her illegitimate son) were indicted on circumstantial evidence and tried before 14th District Court judge Benjamin F. Neal at San Patricio. Although Rodriguez maintained her innocence, she refused to testify in her defense and remained silent throughout the trial, perhaps, some have speculated, to protect her guilty son. Although the jury recommended mercy, Neal ordered her executed. She was hanged on Friday, November 13, 1863. She was 63 at the time of her death. Her last words were quoted as being, "No soy culpable" (I am not guilty). At least one witness to the hanging claimed to have heard a moan from the coffin, which was placed in an unmarked grave. Her ghost is said to haunt San Patricio, especially when a woman is to be executed. Rodriguez is depicted as a spectre with a noose around her neck, riding through the mesquite trees or wailing from the river bottoms.

== Cultural references ==
Chipita Rodriguez has become a folk legend, and since the 1930s, there have been numerous alleged sightings of her ghost along the Nueces River where she was hanged.

Rodriguez has been the subject of numerous books and newspaper articles. Rachel Bluntzer Hebert's epic-length poem "Shadows on the Nueces" and Teresa Palomo Acosta's poem "Chipita" both portray Rodriguez as a heroine. In 1993, the University of Texas music department performed the opera Chipita Rodriguez, composed by Texas A&M University-Corpus Christi professor Lawrence Weiner. A screenplay, The Cursed, was written by Texas A&M University-Corpus Christi and the University of the Incarnate Word graduate and screenwriter Alcario Cary Cadena.

In 2022, a collaboration between Cadena and Mexico City screenwriter-director Carlos Dragonne brought forth interesting possibilities for production. In 2024, Cadena and Dragonne wrote, "CURSED: The Legend of Chipita Rodriguez", a book based on their screenplay.

== See also ==
- List of wrongful convictions in the United States
- Wrongful executions in the United States
- Jane Elkins, an enslaved Texas woman sentenced to execution by hanging for a purported axe murder in 1853
