= New Tech High School (Dallas) =

New Tech High School at B. F. Darrell
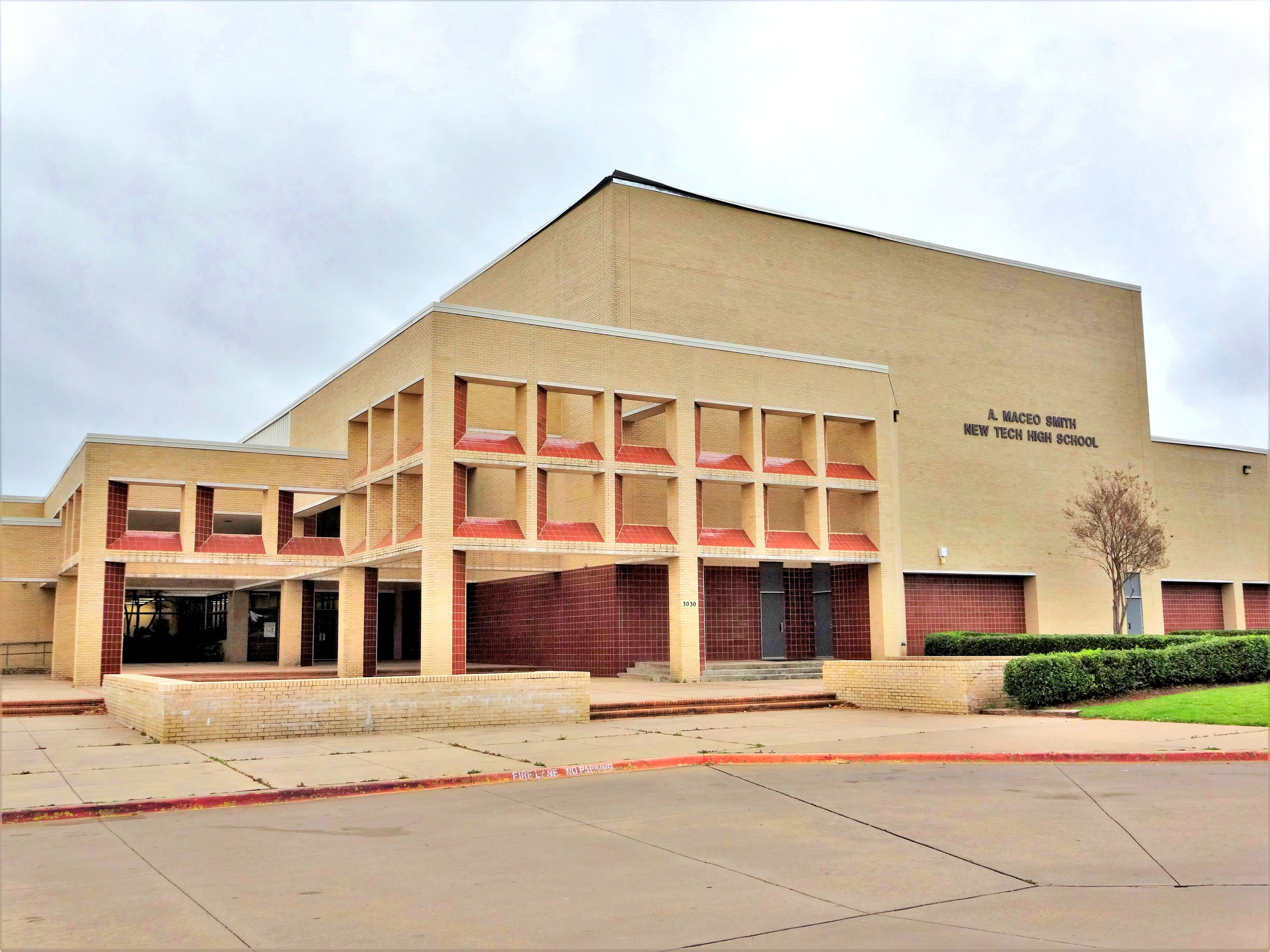
- The previous campus, the former A. Maceo Smith High School (as A. Maceo Smith New Tech), in Dallas, Texas

Location
- 4730 Lancaster Rd. Dallas, Texas 75216; United States
- 32°41′30″N 96°47′24″W

Information
- Funding type: Public
- Opened: 2011
- Status: Open
- School district: Dallas Independent School District
- Superintendent: Mr. Floyd Michael Miles
- Area trustee: Dr.Lew Blackburn
- Principal: Chanel Hutchinson
- Teaching staff: 23.11 (FTE)
- Grades: 9-12
- Student to teacher ratio: 15.71
- Colors: Royal Blue and Silver
- Mascot: Falcon
- Website: Official website

New Tech High School at B. F. Darrell, formerly A. Maceo Smith New Tech High School, is a four-year public high school serving grades 9–12 in the Oak Cliff area of Dallas, Texas (USA). It is part of the Dallas Independent School District. It is a technology magnet school established in 2011 in the former A. Maceo Smith High School; it now occupies the former B. F. Darrell Elementary School. In 2015, the school was rated "Met Standard" by the Texas Education Agency.

The school in its initial campus was named for Antonio Maceo Smith (1903–1977), a pioneer civil rights leader in Dallas.

== History ==
For several years, while it served as a zoned school, A. Maceo Smith High School was a Texas Education Agency "unacceptable" ranked school. In 2011 the district converted A. Maceo Smith into the district's first "school of choice", A. Maceo Smith New Tech High School. Since Smith was reconstituted as a school of choice, it avoided the possibility of the TEA reconstituting or closing the school itself due to its poor performance as a zoned school. A part of the New Tech School Network, the conversion was funded by a $2 million bond.

Sarah Zumwalt Middle School temporarily shared the Smith building with New Tech while the permanent Zumwalt campus was being fixed. In 2018 A. Maceo Smith New Tech High School's name changed to New Tech High School at B.F. Darrell as the school swapped buildings with Barack Obama Male Leadership Academy, with the latter now at A. Maceo Smith, so New Tech now occupies the former B. F. Darrell Elementary Building. New Tech High School at B.F. Darrell started making significant academic gains under new leadership and with a completely new staff. They implemented project based learning and focused on teaching the school-wide learning outcomes: oral communication, written communication, agency, collaboration, and knowledge and thinking. The school went from a "C" rating in 2017 to "B" rating after the covid pandemic, and then to an "A" rating in 2023 and 2024. New Tech High School at B.F. Darrell in Dallas ISD was the only Gold Ribbon School in 2023 and 2024 from the organization Children at Risk. They were also the only school in Dallas ISD to have an A rating across all 3 domains in TEA's accountability rating system for the 2023–2024 school year.

== New Tech in the news ==
In early 2015, drama teacher Scot Pankey, with a cast of students, made national and international headlines by performing a choreographed dance to the song "Uptown Funk" performed by Bruno Mars. As of November 26, 2025, the viral YouTube video had amassed over 15 million views.
