= Dallas Express =

Newspaper in Dallas, Texas (1892–1970)

- Type: Weekly newspaper
- Founded: 1892
- Ceased publication: 1970
- Headquarters: Dallas, Texas; United States
- ISSN: 2331-334X
- OCLC number: 9839625

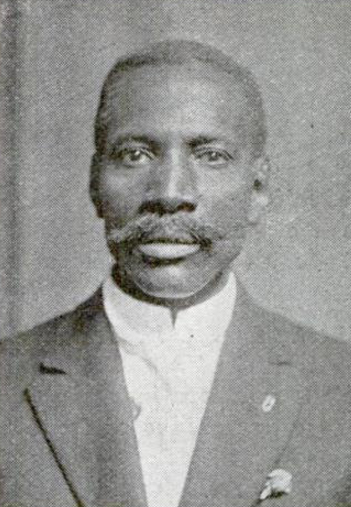
W.E. King, founding publisher of the Dallas Express

The Dallas Express was a weekly newspaper published in Dallas from 1892 to 1970. It covered news of African Americans in Dallas and a large portion of Texas. It called itself "The South's Oldest and Largest Negro Newspaper". It was a member of the Associated Negro Press.

== History ==
The Express publicized lynchings and incidents of violence against blacks that were not always reported in other newspapers, attacked racial segregation and voting restrictions, and in the 1930s urged establishment of "Negro day" and construction of the Hall of Negro Life at the State Fair of Texas, held in Dallas. When the Ku Klux Klan, which according to D Magazine held sway over Dallas politics in the 1920s, threatened the Express in an insulting letter and called the city "white man's country", the newspaper published the letter and responded. "We are not agitators", it said. "But we do stand by the truth as we see it and protest against injustice". Even while under white ownership in the 1930s, the Express was an ardent supporter of and advocate for the black community. It became more vocal after its 1938 acquisition by black leaders and campaigned for federally funded public housing, improved quality of black education in public schools, elimination of pay discrimination between black and white teachers, and the hiring of black police officers in Dallas. It published photographs of black slum conditions with its campaign promoting public housing, a somewhat shocking use of graphics for the times.

The Dallas Express title was later reused by a right-leaning online publication established in 2021. It has no connection to the historical publication.

== Ownership ==
W. E. King founded the Express and operated it until his murder by Hattie C. Burleson in late August 1919. In 1930, experiencing financial difficulties, it was acquired by Southwestern Negro Press, which was controlled by Travis Campbell, a white man who had been the printer for the Express and who purchased the paper to keep it in business. In February 1938 it was acquired by A. Maceo Smith, an insurance executive and secretary of the Negro Chamber of Commerce; Rev. Maynard Jackson, pastor of New Hope Baptist Church; Dr. E. E. Ward, a physician; Henry Strickland, president of Excelsior Life Insurance Co.; and C. F. Starkes, president of Peoples Undertaking.

== See also ==
- History of African Americans in Dallas–Fort Worth
