= Lynching of Allen Brooks =

1910 mob lynching in Dallas, Texas, U.S.

Coordinates: 32°46′49.8″N 96°47′57.9″W

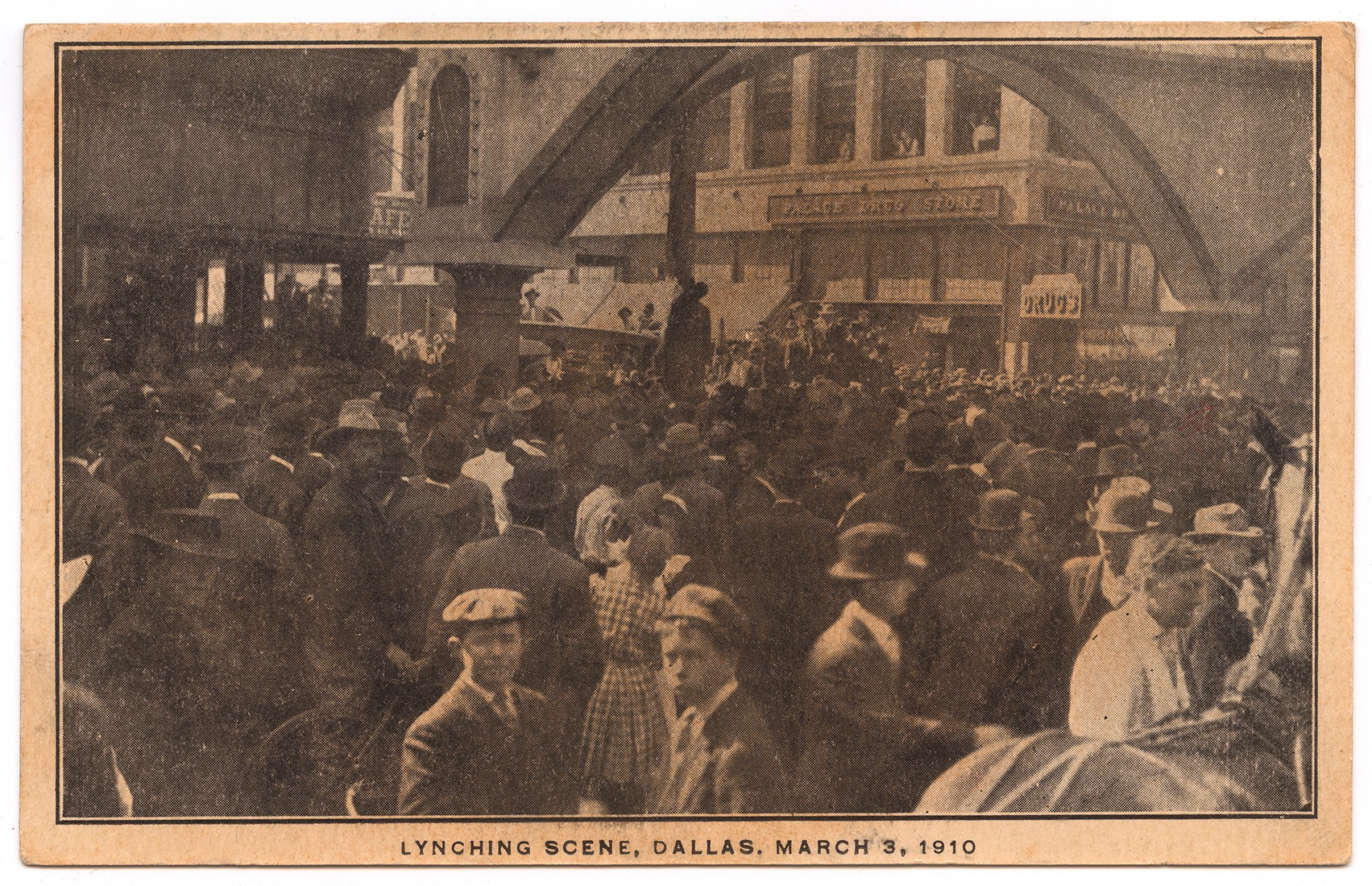
Brooks' death was pictured in a lynching postcard.

Allen Brooks was a black American man who was lynched by a mob on March 3, 1910, in Dallas, Texas. Brooks had been accused of raping a young white girl, and on the day he was set to face trial at the Dallas County Courthouse, a mob numbering in the thousands pulled him by rope out of a second-story window at the courthouse, dragged him to Elks Arch, and hanged him from a telephone pole. No one was ever charged in connection with the lynching.

The site of Brooks' lynching was unmarked for 111 years until a nonprofit placed a historical marker in 2021. The organization Remembering Black Dallas under the leadership of George Keaton Jr., planned activities and programs for local high school students, with scholarships that support students writing on the history of racist violence and the civil rights movement in Dallas. Financial support for the marker and the scholarships was provided by the Equal Justice Initiative.

== Background ==
Allen Brooks, who died in his late 50s or 60s, (Note: Sources conflict as to Brooks's age in 1910: The New York Times cites the academic Christopher J. Dowdy for an age of 59, while the Dallas Monthly writes that he was "at least 57", CBS News gives his age as 64, Michael Phillips an age of 68, and Herbert Shapiro described him as "elderly".) was possibly born into slavery around 1852 in Maryland. He was a black man who lived in Dallas, Texas, and worked as a handyman. In late February 1910, (Note: Dallas Monthly gives the date as February 23, while The New York Times says February 27.) Brooks was accused of raping Mary Beuvens, (Note: Also spelled Bivens and Buvens.) a two-and-a-half-year-old girl. He had been fixing her family's furnace when Mary went missing. Shortly afterwards, the two were found together. George Keaton Jr., the director of Remembering Black Dallas, told The New York Times that there was no proof that Brooks was guilty of rape.

Brooks was taken to jail and formally indicted a day later. 200 people gathered by the jail the day after his indictment. While Brooks was initially held in the Dallas County jail, fears for his safety prompted the authorities to keep him in several jails outside the city limits. By early March, he was held in nearby Sherman, Texas.

== Lynching ==
On March 3, 1910, Brooks was in the Dallas County Courthouse to face trial. As a crowd had already begun to gather before he arrived in Dallas, Brooks was sent to the courthouse's jury room. The courthouse was filled by 9:00 in the morning. Brooks' lawyer had only recently taken the case—an earlier lawyer had quit—and so the case was recessed for thirty minutes while they consulted. At 10:00, the judge, R. B. Seay, heard a request to prolong the recess. By this point, there were at least 1,000 people in the courthouse. A ladder was soon placed on the side of the building.

Around 11:15, the mob forcibly attempted to overtake control of the proceedings and fought with 70–150 law enforcement officers, including Ben E. Cabell. The officers were overwhelmed, though none made an effort to use a gun in his defense, and upon reaching Brooks, who was on the second story of the courthouse, the mob tied a rope around his neck and pulled him out a window. Brooks landed on his head on the street below, where more of the mob waited. Despite being unconscious, he was subjected to further violence by the mob, including being kicked and stomped on. A contemporary report described Brooks' face as having been "crushed into a pulp". Brooks may have been dead by this point. He was dragged by a car to Elks Arch at the intersection of Main Street and Akard Street, an arch built by the Benevolent and Protective Order of Elks to celebrate the organization's national meeting. There the mob hanged him from a telephone pole or an iron spike beneath the arch. People carved pieces from the telephone pole and took pieces of Brooks' clothing as souvenirs. Historian Herbert Shapiro reports that by the time Dallas's undertaker arrived at the scene, he found that Brooks' body had been reduced to a "shapeless mass of flesh," with his undershirt and flannel—the only clothes still on his body—in tatters.

The mob's size was estimated to be 2,000–6,000 people. A contemporary report published by the Dallas Times Herald estimated that 2,000–3,000 were in the mob as it went from the courthouse to Elks Arch, and 5,000–6,000 were at the arch.

== Aftermath ==
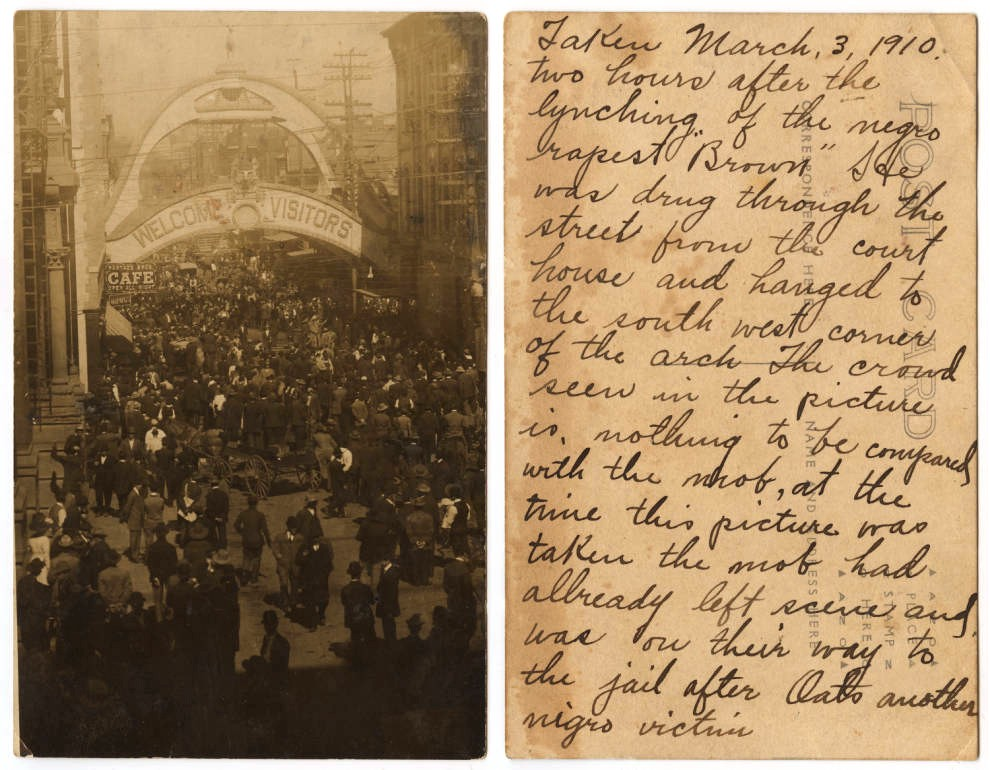
Postcard depicting the crowd two hours after the lynching

After the lynching, the city's sheriff, A. L. Ledbetter, said that it had been "impossible to protect" Brooks. Erasmus Gilbert Senter, a member of the Texas Senate, wrote an open letter criticizing the mob's ignorance of the rule of law, but many in the community did not share his view.

The lynching was widely covered in contemporary papers. Many local newspapers defended the actions of the mob as carrying out justice. An investigation undertaken by Dallas authorities never named any members of the mob; Shapiro writes that punishing the mob members was "out of the question" because the police officers who had been charged with protecting Brooks would not identify any of them. No one was ever charged in connection to the lynching.

Postcards were published depicting the event. One such postcard included written commentary on the back: "This is a token of a great day we had in Dallas, March 3, a negro was hung for an assault on a three year old girl." History professor Terry Anne Scott wrote that the postcard conveyed a "grotesque, murderous scene" as a "salutation and [...] a friendly jolt for a reciprocal jester." Such postcards were reprinted thousands of times. William H. Atwell, then a United States District Attorney, denied requests to halt the mailing of them, stating that the only law broken was "the law of common decency and love of the city in which one lives".

Amon G. Carter, of the Fort Worth Star-Telegram, had written a special edition covering the lynching by 12:30 that same day. Two paperboys traveled with Carter to Dallas, selling all of the one thousand copies they had brought in thirty minutes. They had sold a further four thousand copies by the day's end, and one thousand more in nearby Sherman and Denison.

Elks Arch was taken down within a year of the lynching.

=== Historical marker ===
In 2018, the Dallas City Council approved efforts to create a memorial to Brooks. The nonprofit Remembering Black Dallas initially requested that the Dallas city government apply for a historical marker funded by the Equal Justice Initiative in December 2018, but in November of the following year applied for funding independently of the city. Remembering Black Dallas created a subsidiary group, the Dallas County Justice Initiative, to manage the project. The Dallas County Justice Initiative placed a marker in 2021, which was described as Dallas County's first such marker. Remembering Black Dallas also planned activities and programs for local high school students, with scholarships that support students writing on the history of racist violence and the Civil Rights movement in Dallas. Financial support for the scholarships was provided by the Equal Justice Initiative. In July 2023 a second historical marker was placed at the Dallas County Courthouse, where Brooks was held before being lynched.

== See also ==
- List of lynching victims in the United States

== Bibliography ==
- Apel, Dora (2004). Imagery of Lynching: Black Men, White Women, and the Mob. Rutgers University Press. ISBN 978-0-8135-3459-6.
- Cervantez, Brian A. (2019). Amon Carter: A Lone Star Life. University of Oklahoma Press. ISBN 978-0-8061-6329-1.
- Phillips, Michael (January 1, 2010). White Metropolis: Race, Ethnicity, and Religion in Dallas, 1841-2001. University of Texas Press. ISBN 978-0-292-77424-7.
- Scott, Terry Anne (2022). Lynching and Leisure: Race and the Transformation of Mob Violence in Texas. University of Arkansas Press. ISBN 978-1-68226-189-7.
- Shapiro, Herbert (1988). White Violence and Black Response: From Reconstruction to Montgomery. University of Massachusetts Press. doi:10.2307/j.ctv2nrz7mg. ISBN 978-0-87023-578-8. JSTOR j.ctv2nrz7mg. S2CID 249804043.
