= Mohan Kankanhalli =

Researcher in Singapore

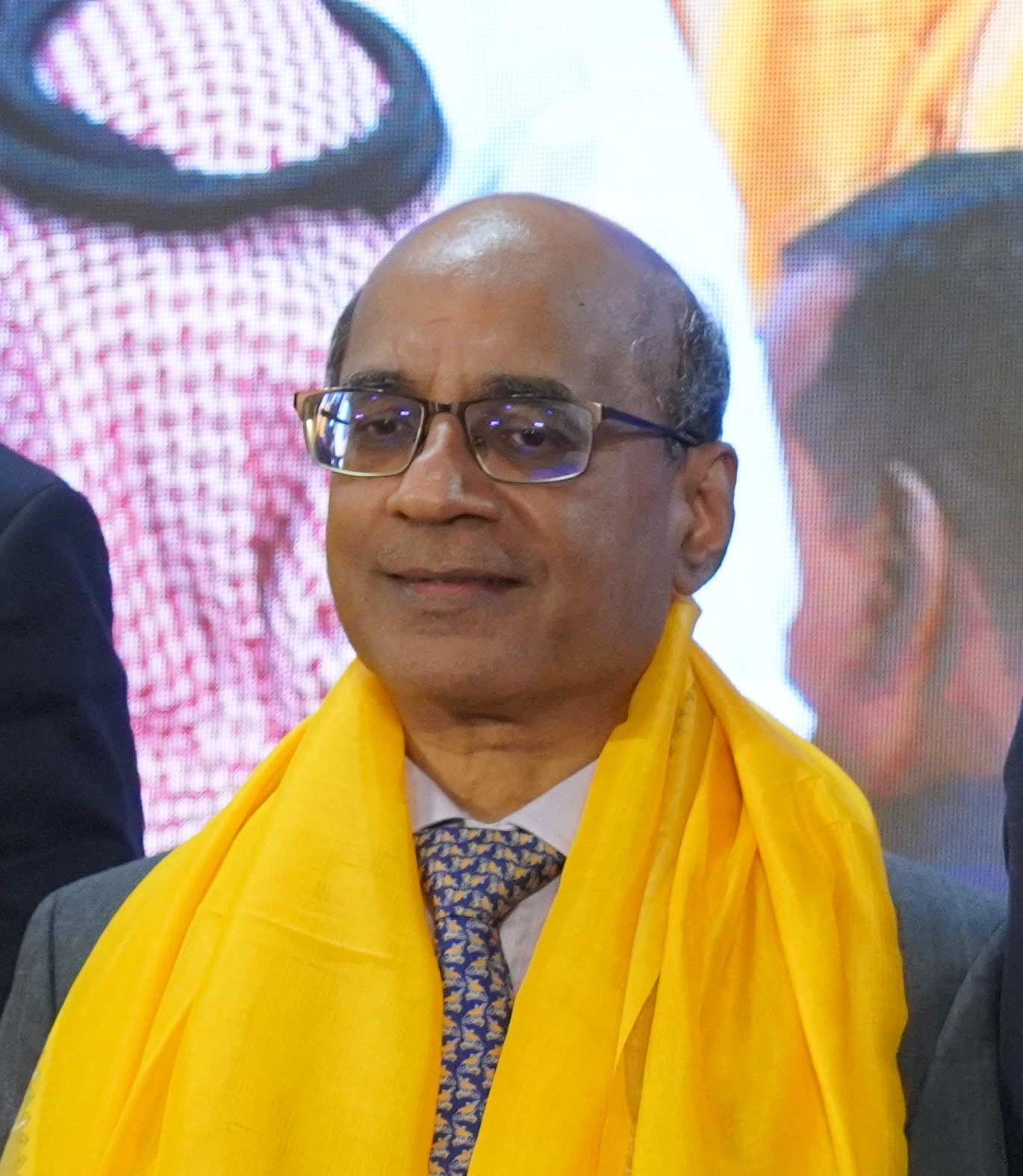
- Mohan Kankanhalli at CII Partnership Summit, Visakhapatnam in 2025

Academic background
- Education: IIT Kharagpur

Mohan Kankanhalli is a researcher and professor at the National University of Singapore School of Computing. He was named Fellow of the Institute of Electrical and Electronics Engineers (IEEE) in 2014 for contributions to multimedia content processing and security. He was named as an ACM Fellow, in the 2024 class of fellows, "for contributions to multimedia content processing and multimedia security".

== Education ==
Mohan completed his undergraduate studies with a B.Tech. degree from IIT Kharagpur in 1986. He completed M.S. in 1988 and Ph.D. in 1990 from the Rensselaer Polytechnic Institute.

== Career ==
He worked as an Assistant Professor in Department of Electrical Engineering at the Indian Institute of Science, Bangalore in 1997 and joined the National University of Singapore as a Senior Lecturer in 1998. He is the Director of NUS AI Institute and currently is the Provost’s Chair Professor of Computer Science. He is also the Deputy Executive Chairman of AI Singapore, Singapore's national AI program.
