= Jane Elkins =

19th-century enslaved woman convicted of murder

- Born: Jane c. 1800; Dallas, Texas
- Died: May 27, 1853; Dallas, Texas
- Known for: The first Texan woman to be legally executed
- Criminal charges: Murder
- Criminal penalty: Death by hanging

Jane Elkins (c. 1800 — May 27, 1853) was an enslaved African American woman from Dallas, Texas. She is known for being the first woman to be legally executed in Texas.

== Early life ==
Jane Elkins was born around the year 1800 in Dallas, Texas. Some accounts say she was born later, in the 1820s. In 1844, she was sold by Edward Welborn to John Young for $400. Jane was the first person to be legally sold in Dallas County.

Young then sold Jane to Smith E. Elkins, from whom she gets her surname. America Elkins, the wife of Mr. Elkins, hired Jane out to Andrew C. Wisdom. Wisdom, a widower, lived near Farmers Branch with his two children. Jane watched the Wisdom children and did most of the domestic tasks.

== State of Texas vs. Jane, a Slave ==
In 1852, Jane allegedly killed Wisdom using an axe while he slept. Jane's precise motive is not known; various sources claim the murder was due to psychosis, revenge for a sexual assault, or wanting to be a free woman. Other sources claim that Jane was innocent and did not commit the crime at all.

The Dallas County Grand Jury indicted Jane for the murder on May 10, 1853. Judge John H. Reagan oversaw the case with a jury composed of all white, Southern men. The case was named "State of Texas vs. Jane, a Slave." Jane pled not guilty, and did not speak for the entirety of the trial. Jane was convicted of Wilson's murder on May 16.

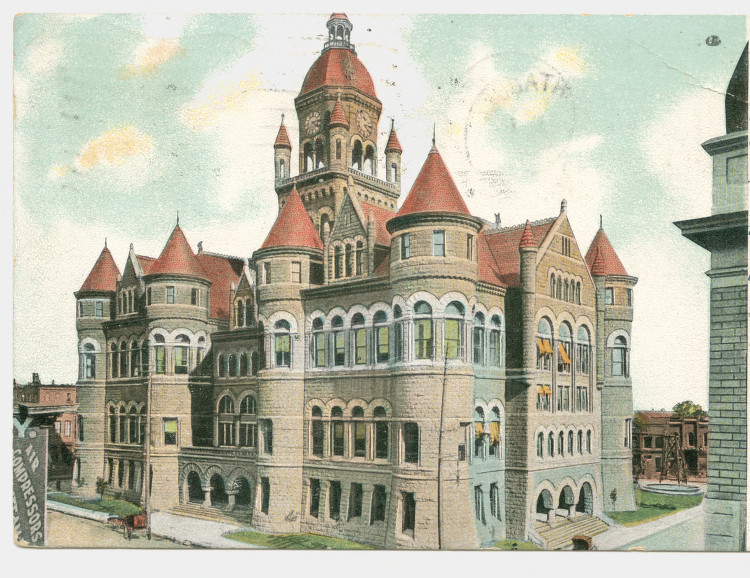
The Dallas County Courthouse, c. 1908, the site of Jane's execution

Judge Reagan sentenced Jane to death by hanging on the following day, May 17. On May 27, 1853, Jane was hanged outside the Dallas County Courthouse. According to historian Daina Ramey Berry, several hundred white people gathered to watch her execution. Jane was the first woman to be legally executed in the state of Texas.

According to the historian George Keaton, it is unlikely that Jane received a fair trial.

== Burial ==
At the time of her execution, Jane was worth "$700." Jane's body was initially put in a shallow grave near the Dallas courthouse. However, her body was later used as a medical cadaver for science.

== Legacy ==
In 2014, Jane's story was turned into a play entitled "The Ballad of Jane Elkins" by playwright Anyika McMillan-Herod, who first heard the story from her grandmother. Jane is played by actress Sydney Hewitt. The play supports the theory that Jane was a victim of rape by Wilson, causing her to commit the murder.

On June 22, 2024, Jane was memorialized with a historical marker at Martyrs Park near Dealey Plaza. The project, consisting of multiple historical markers for victims of racially-motivated violence, was advocated for by George Keaton and his organization Remembering Black Dallas.

== See also ==
- Josefa Rodríguez, long considered the only woman legally hanged in Texas (in 1863)
