= Dallas Examiner =

Newspaper

The Dallas Examiner
- Type: Weekly newspaper
- Founder(s): Fred Finch, Jr.
- Publisher: Mollie Finch Belt
- Editor: Robyn Jimenez
- Founded: 1986; 40 years ago
- Language: English
- Headquarters: 4510 Malcolm X Blvd, Dallas, TX 75215
- Circulation: 5,000 (as of 2023)
- Website: www.dallasexaminer.com

The Dallas Examiner is a weekly newspaper that covers the African-American community in Dallas-Fort Worth.

== History ==
The newspaper was founded in 1986 by Fred Finch, Jr., an influential attorney and civil rights leader, along with his wife, Mildred Finch, a math teacher described by The New York Times as "almost legendary in her dedication to her students and community." Financed entirely by the Finches, it was originally mailed to subscribers. It is the largest Black-owned broadsheet newspaper in Dallas-Fort Worth, and the first Black-owned newspaper to be published digitally.

Fred and Mildred Finch were murdered after four issues of The Dallas Examiner were published. Their daughter, Mollie Finch Belt, assumed the role of publisher following the death of her parents. In 2002, it was named "Best Weekly Newspaper" by the Texas Publisher's Association. It was also named "Best Weekly Newspaper" by the regional chapter of the National Association of Black Journalists.

On June 28, 2023, the City of Dallas approved a $170,988 grant to help fund renovations and construction costs for the newspapers's headquarters. The entire project is expected to cost $184,000. CEO and publisher Mollie Finch Belt is also contributing $13,450 in owners’ equity. Other funding comes from the South Dallas-Fair Park Opportunity Fund. The building at South Dallas-Fair Park was built in 1950. It had been used as a law office until about seven years ago when the newspaper moved in.
