= Irma Lerma Rangel Young Women's Leadership School =

Location
- Dallas, Texas U.S. 32.773970°N 96.760481°W

Information
- Type: Secondary, Single-sex education, Public
- Motto: Girls Today, Women Tomorrow, Leaders Forever.
- Established: August 16, 2004
- School district: Dallas Independent School District
- Principal: Yvonne Rojas
- Grades: 6-12
- Colors: Red, navy blue, and white
- Mascot: Panther
- Website: rangel.dallasisd.org

The Irma Lerma Rangel Young Women's Leadership School is a school for girls in Dallas, Texas. Part of the Dallas Independent School District, it is the first public all-girls school in the state and is renowned for its challenging coursework and high college matriculation rate.

The school was established in 2004 and graduated its first class of 21 students in 2009. It opened under the leadership of Principal Vivian Taylor-Samudio.

The school is in proximity to Fair Park.

== History ==
The school is named after Irma Lerma Rangel who was the first Mexican-American woman elected to the Texas House of Representatives and the first woman elected as Chair of the Mexican-American Legislative Caucus.

Palm Harbor Homes founder and philanthropist Lee Posey, along with his wife, visited The Young Women's Leadership School of East Harlem, a high-performing all girls' school in New York City. Posey decided to have a similar school established in Dallas. Posey's organization, originally the Young Women's Leadership Foundation and later the Foundation for the Education of Young Women, established a partnership with DISD and had the school established as the first all girls school in Texas.

Originally housed in the historic Stephen J. Hay Building, located at 3801 Herschel Ave. in the city's Oak Lawn district, the Irma L. Rangel Young Women's Leadership School opened its doors to 125 students on August 16, 2004 under the leadership of Principal Vivian Taylor-Samudio, who headed the school from its inception to her retirement in 2015. In the 2005-2006 academic year, it expanded to receive ninth grade students, and the following year, it further expanded to receive sixth and tenth grade students. The school finally opened to grades sixth through twelve during the 2008-2009 academic year, graduating its first class in 2009.

In 2010 Rangel parents protested a plan to require children in Rangel's middle school to reapply for the high school grades.

== Network ==
The school is a member of the Young Women's Preparatory Network, which funds programs including leadership-building summer camps and on-campus college advising. As part of the network, it maintains relationships with other institutions in the network, including sister school Ann Richards School for Young Women Leaders in Austin. Once graduated, students maintain connected via an alumnae network that helps establish professional connections.

The Barack Obama Male Leadership Academy, established in 2011, is the school's all-boys counterpart, or brother school.

== Creed ==
In 2013, Principal Vivan Taylor-Samudio introduced and instilled the school creed, to be recited by students each morning.

== Programs ==
The school includes a hand bell choir, a vocal choir, a string instrumental orchestra, academic pentathlon and decathlon, a robotics team, a debate team, a yearbook staff, a GSA called Rainbow Rangers, an after-school community service club, and many more.

== Accolades ==
- Texas Education Agency exemplary school (2006 to present)
- Teacher Kathryn Tharp received 1st place in 2005 Dallas Art Educators Association awards
- Eight teachers have been awarded the Texas Instruments STEM Award: Kimberly Ferguson ('08), Natalie Buxkemper ('09), Dana Clark ('10), Verona Washington ('12), Joseph Ibarra ('15), Annemarie Fehrenbacher ('16), Luis Ariaiza ('17), and Thu Nguyen ('22)
- 1st place in District 5A High School One-Act Play Competition (2007–2008)
- Received grant from the Dallas Museum of Art for the 6th grade Talented and Gifted class (2008–2009)
- Received grant from Citibank for Introduction to Business class for 7th and 8th graders
- 2011 and 2017 National Blue Ribbon School (named by U.S. Department of Education)
- Ranked as the 3rd best high school and 2nd best middle school in the North Texas area by Children at Risk
- 4th place in Sweepstakes at the 2013 Texas Math & Science Coaches Association State Championship (Many trophies and medals were also awarded to team members individually)
  - 1st place in Science
  - 4th place in General Mathematics
  - 8th place in Number Sense
  - 9th place in Calculator
- Named 44th Most Challenging High School in the US by The Washington Post in 2017

== See also ==
- Women's education in the United States
