= George Keaton Jr. =

American historian and educator (1956-2022)

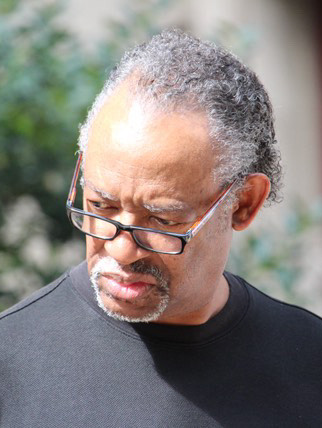
- Keaton in 2021
- Born: December 3, 1956; Dallas, Texas, U.S.
- Died: December 7, 2022 (aged 66); Dallas, Texas, U.S.
- Occupations: African American historian, founder of Remembering Black Dallas

George Elvin Keaton Jr. (December 3, 1956 – December 7, 2022) was an African American historian and educator whose work centered on the history of Black Dallas. He was an author and helped establish historical markers in Dallas County that commemorated significant figures and events in Dallas' history.

== Early life and career ==
George Keaton Jr. was born on December 3, 1956, in Dallas, Texas. He was a graduate of the University of North Texas, earning a bachelor's degree and later a master's degree in clinical counseling and an additional degree in Guidance Counseling. In 2017 he received his doctorate in Humanities from the Texas Institute of Bible Studies. He worked for the Dallas Independent School District for 31 years as an elementary school teacher and guidance counselor.

Keaton's work as a researcher began with his own genealogy, stating in an interview: "My grandmother was a great historian. She talked about her husband’s family a lot – the Turner family…She worked for her father-in-law, who was a former slave, who had 90 acres near where the Cooper Center is now. She weighed the cotton and kept the books…she built those interests into me; she made me who I am today." He established Remembering Black Dallas in 2015 and was its executive director. The purpose of the organization was to "promote the African American life, history, artifacts, and culture of Dallas and its surrounding cities". This organization was a continuation of a previously existing organization called Black Dallas Remembered, which was run by Dr. Mamie L. McKnight.

He was a caretaker of White Rock Cemetery Garden of Memories, which was Dallas' first integrated cemetery, and operated a catering business.

== Historical preservation ==
Keaton's work led to his frequent collaboration with UT Dallas' School of Arts, Humanities and Technology, collaborating with professors to present his research to students and assisting in connecting students with historical projects in Dallas.

By 2020, Keaton was recognized as a local historian, leading local history tours and working with the City of Dallas to create a historical marker for Dallas' Martyr's Park. Martyr's Park was the site of a mass lynching that had occurred in July 1860. A fire had ravaged the city, and enslaved African Americans were blamed for the conflagration. Three men, Patrick Jennings, Samuel Smith, and a man called Old Cato, were hanged days after the fire. Keaton had been asked to assist with creating text for the marker, and insisted on the inclusion of the word "lynching" in the marker as well as recognizing that the men were enslaved. As part of the project, they also created a historical marker for Jane Elkins, an enslaved woman who was hanged in 1853 for allegedly murdering her owner. He would continue to work on memorializing the site and other lynchings in Dallas until his passing.

Keaton led the Dallas County Justice Initiative coalition, which was formed in 2020. This coalition played a role in the memorialization of lynching victims in Dallas, including Reuben Johnson and Allen Brooks. A marker dedicated to Allen Brooks, who had been lynched by a mob on March 3, 1910, was unveiled on November 20, 2021. Keaton extensively researched the history of Brooks' alleged crime and in the capacity of director of the Dallas County Justice Initiative secured funding for the marker from the Equal Justice Initiative. In an interview, Keaton stated that "Everybody knows J.F.K. was assassinated here in Dallas, we have no problem recognizing that part of history, but when it comes to our people of color, the sins and the wrongdoings that white America has done to our people, they do not want to be known."

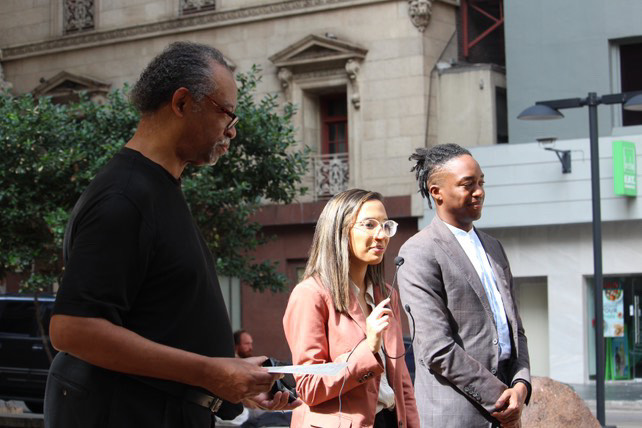
Keaton with speakers at the Dallas County Justice Initiative - Soil Collection for Allen Brooks

Remembering Black Dallas and Keaton spearheaded the research and work to establish a Texas State historical marker at Anderson Bonner Park. Anderson Bonner was born into slavery in Alabama in 1839, and by the time of his death in North Dallas in 1920, had acquired over 3,000 acres of land per Keaton's research. While the park dedicated to Bonner had been established in 1976, it had taken Keaton years of research and collaboration with Bonner's descendants to establish a historical marker.

Our Stories: Black Families in Early Dallas, which Keaton co-edited with Judith Garrett Segura, was published in September 2022 through UNT Press. The book features stories collected and published by Dr. Mamie McKnight and Black Dallas Remembered and more contemporary research on Dallas' African American communities and families. It includes personal narratives as well as the history of the establishment of Black businesses, churches, and community organizations in Dallas.

Keaton died on December 6, 2022, at Baylor Hospital following a brief battle with cancer. His viewing was held at Dallas' Hall of State, with his service being conducted at Christian Chapel Temple of Faith.

== Awards and recognitions ==
Keaton was a board member of Preservation Dallas and the African American Museum of Dallas. In 2019 he was inducted into the African American Education Archives and History Program’s Hall of Fame. A moment of silence was dedicated to Keaton during the unveiling of the historical marker for Dr. Marcellus Cooper – Keaton had served as an advisor on the marker and helped coordinate the unveiling before his passing.

A conference room in the African American Museum of Dallas was dedicated to Keaton in February 2024.
