= List of Mike Tyson Mysteries episodes =

The following is an episode list for the American adult animated television series Mike Tyson Mysteries. The series premiered on Cartoon Network's nighttime programming block Adult Swim on October 27, 2014, and the fourth and final season premiered on June 30, 2019, with the final episode aired on February 16, 2020. 70 episodes in total were produced, spanning four seasons.

== Series overview ==
Season	Episodes	Originally released	
Season	Episodes	First released	Last released
1	10	October 27, 2014	February 8, 2015
2	20	November 1, 2015	June 12, 2016
3	20	May 14, 2017	May 13, 2018
4	20	June 30, 2019	February 16, 2020

== Episodes ==
=== Season 1 (2014–15) ===
No. overall	No. in season	Title	Directed by	Written by	Original release date	US viewers (millions)
1	1	"The End"	Ethan Spaulding	Hugh Davidson	October 27, 2014	1.01
Mike and the gang travel to Cormac McCarthy's ranch to help him with his unfinished novel. There, they are warned by the ranch's property caretaker of a Chupacabra attacking McCarthy's horses. Guest starring Damon Jones.
2	2	"Ultimate Judgment Day"	Ethan Spaulding	Story by : Kevin Shinick; Teleplay by : Hugh Davidson	November 3, 2014	0.97
Responding to a binary code distress message, Mike and the team travel to IBM's headquarters which is hosting a chess rematch between Garry Kasparov and Deep Blue. There, they must figure out who sent the message and why. They meet the ghost of Trevor Berbick (Jordan Black) enroute. Complications arise when Mike knocks out Kasparov before the match. Guest starring Stephen Root.
3	3	"Heavyweight Champion of the Moon"	Ethan Spaulding	Hugh Davidson and Patrick Devine	November 10, 2014	0.97
4	4	"Is Magic Real?"	Ethan Spaulding	Hugh Davidson and Ted Michels	November 17, 2014	0.89
After receiving a message from an "Old Wizard" (Jonathan Banks) asking if magic is real, Mike and the gang travel to the Camelot Hotel, where they meet the sender - an elderly man who had a winning streak at gambling, but lost it all one night and was banned from the casino. The gang take the Old Wizard to another casino, where Pigeon gets him a $1 million buy-in from Robert Redford (Jeff Bergman), in exchange for some time with Yung Hee. Guest starring Fred Armisen and Jill Matson-Sachoff.
5	5	"Mite Tyson"	Jeff Siergey	Hugh Davidson, Larry Dorf, and Rachel Ramras	November 24, 2014	1.35
Mike is brought to the hospital after his skin is riddled with mite bites. When Mike, Marquess, Yung Hee, and the doctor suspect that the mites are coming from Pigeon, the gang kicks him out of the house. But when Mike discovers that he was misdiagnosed, the gang rushes out to get Pigeon back before he becomes a test subject for cosmetic products.
6	6	"A River Runs Through It Into a Heart of Darkness"	Ethan Spaulding	Hugh Davidson	January 11, 2015	1.56
The team travels first to China, then to Nicaragua; a Nicaraguan businessman (James Hong) wants Mike's help in winning over the indigenous jungle-dwellers who are firmly against his canal project.
7	7	"Kidnapped!"	Ethan Spaulding	Hugh Davidson and David Hoffman	January 18, 2015	1.69
A Russian mobster abducts Yung Hee after Pigeon fails to pay a gambling debt, forcing Pigeon and Marquess to work together in Mike's absence to rescue her. Guest starring Carla Delaney, Lev Gorn, Michelle Noh, and Jeremy Rowley.
8	8	"House Haunters"	Jeff Siergey	Hugh Davidson, Larry Dorf, and Rachel Ramras	January 25, 2015	1.55
The Team helps a married couple with purchasing a new house, but the situation takes a turn for the worse when Marquess discovers a terrifying secret about one potential home. Guest starring Jill Matson-Sachoff.
9	9	"Night Moves"	Ethan Spaulding	Hugh Davidson, Larry Dorf, and Rachel Ramras	February 1, 2015	1.67
Mike must make a difficult choice when Andrew (Andrew Friedman), Yung Hee's new boyfriend, believes he is a werewolf and Yung Hee is scratched during their date.
10	10	"Ty-Stunned"	Jeff Siergey	Hugh Davidson, Larry Dorf, and Rachel Ramras	February 8, 2015	1.53
Mike and the gang take on the most dangerous mystery yet - a murder mystery. However, Mike becomes distracted by purchasing hummus and arranging endorsement deals with his agent Deezy, causing a chain of events that lead to the home of the killer. Guest starring Stephanie Courtney.

=== Season 2 (2015–16) ===
No. overall	No. in season	Title	Directed by	Written by	Original release date	US viewers (millions)
11	1	"What's That Gnoise?"	Jeff Siergey	Hugh Davidson, Larry Dorf, and Rachel Ramras	November 1, 2015	0.86
A frazzled suburban housewife (Lisa Schurga), the mother of four, asks the team to investigate a strange "high-pitched incredibly-annoying" noise coming from her minivan.
12	2	"For the Troops"	Ethan Spaulding	Hugh Davidson, Larry Dorf, and Rachel Ramras	November 8, 2015	0.98
Mike's agent Deezy gets him a gig entertaining armed forces in Afghanistan after Wayne Brady cancelled. While Mike is away, Deezy is left to solve a mystery that arrived at Mike's house.
13	3	"She's a Bayniac"	Jeff Siergey	Hugh Davidson, Larry Dorf, and Rachel Ramras	November 15, 2015	1.03
The team remains in Las Vegas. A doubting husband(Alex Staggs) suspects his wife(Edi Patterson) of cheating on him, and calls in the mystery team to investigate.
14	4	"Last Night on Charlie Rose"	Ethan Spaulding	Hugh Davidson, Larry Dorf, and Rachel Ramras	November 22, 2015	0.94
Mike and the team travel to New York City; they are asked to locate Gregg Popovich, who disappears after appearing on Charlie Rose. Guest starring Mike MacRae and Annie Mumolo.
15	5	"Old Man of the Mountain"	Jeff Siergey	Hugh Davidson, Larry Dorf, and Rachel Ramras	December 6, 2015	1.00
Siblings debate whether to put their 96-year-old father in a nursing home and ask Mike for advice. When the team arrives, they find the man frozen. Mike's group discovers a secret room revealing that the man was a Nazi loyal to Adolf Hitler. When the old man thaws out and starts attacking the group, they are saved by the sudden appearance of a Yeti that eats the old man. Everyone is traumatized except Pigeon. Guest starring Steve Little and Wendi McLendon-Covey.
16	6	"Jason B. Sucks"	Ethan Spaulding	Hugh Davidson, Larry Dorf, and Rachel Ramras	December 13, 2015	1.02
Mike Tyson, Yung Hee, Pigeon, and Marquess of Queensberry look for a man named Jason B. (Keith Carradine) who wrote a negative review about the Mike Tyson Mysteries group.
17	7	"A Plaintive Wail"	Jeff Siergey	Hugh Davidson, Larry Dorf, and Rachel Ramras	December 20, 2015	1.01
A Boston restaurant owner (Sarah Baker) believes a curse is interfering with her business, and calls in Mike and the Team to investigate. Guest starring Carla Delaney.
18	8	"Tent Revival"	Ethan Spaulding	Hugh Davidson, Larry Dorf, and Rachel Ramras	January 3, 2016	1.09
Mike's house gets termites again causing his group to stay at a hotel. When Yung Hee returns to the tented house to retrieve her cell phone, she finds men in robes attempting to summon the Devil. The men attempt to sacrifice her (revealing that Yung Hee is a virgin, which she insists is by choice). When the Devil is summoned, he is quickly knocked out by Mike and the devil worshipers flee. Guest starring Laird Macintosh.
19	9	"Greece is the Word"	Jeff Siergey	Hugh Davidson, Larry Dorf, and Rachel Ramras	January 10, 2016	1.08
The Mystery Team is hired by Los Angeles' City Hall to find the cause of a slowdown at the L.A. Port Authority. After wasting a year and a half spending the money they received up front, Mike is desperate to solve the mystery one day before their deadline. Mike drives the Mystery Van off a dock in an attempt to land on a ship but misses badly. The van sinks to the bottom of the harbor and the team nearly drowns. They are revived in the city of Atlantis, which is inhabited mainly by Greek thieves. The thieves reveal that they caused the Port slowdown to steal electronics from Chinese ships. At a celebration with Greek dancing, plates are smashed and the city's glass dome cracks. The underwater city floods, but the team escapes leaving the Mystery Van behind. Mike reports their findings to City Hall, but city officials refuse to reimburse him for the lost van. The leader of the thieves (Jeff Bergman) survives and uses the Mystery Van to raid a beach. Guest starring Mitch Silpa.
20	10	"Ogopogo!"	Ethan Spaulding	Hugh Davidson, Larry Dorf, and Rachel Ramras	January 17, 2016	1.49
Pigeon's ex-wife Sandra (Ariane Price) recruits the team to find her missing husband—Pigeon. She is trying to sell a lake house but Pigeon never signed the divorce papers. Mike has to force Pigeon to cooperate, but Pigeon switches places with one of the carrier pigeons. He later has a change of heart and meets the team at the lake house. Sandra explains she isn't a witch, but that she prayed to God to show Pigeon the error of his ways resulting in his transformation. Yung finds an old photo of Pigeon in his human form and becomes deeply attracted to him. Pigeon and Sandra have a torrid reunion and announce they will stay together. Sandra says she will pray again and Pigeon assumes she will ask for him to be restored. Instead she asks to be transformed into a pigeon too, to Pigeon's disgust. As she takes to the air in celebration, the Ogopogo leaps out of the lake and eats her.
21	11	"Life Is but a Dream"	Jeff Siergey	Hugh Davidson, Larry Dorf, and Rachel Ramras	April 17, 2016	1.195
The Mystery Team assists the husband (Michael Naughton) of a woman in a coma. Marquess says that as a ghost he can enter her dream-like state, but the others cannot. Mike kills himself, Yung Hee and Pigeon with poison so they can accompany Marquess. They find that the woman doesn't want to leave the coma where she is locked in a dream in which she is having torrid sex with her stepson. The team members are revived by doctors. They decide to tell the husband that they could not find his wife. She awakes on her own and embraces her stepson passionately.
22	12	"Unsolved Situations"	Ethan Spaulding	Story by : Hugh Davidson and Guy Stevenson; Teleplay by : Hugh Davidson, Larry Dorf, Rachel Ramras, Guy Stevenson	April 24, 2016	1.320
When pigeons stop bringing mysteries, Mike disbands the team under the belief that they have solved all the mysteries in the world. Yung goes off to college and Mike sends Marquess to live with Larry Holmes. However, he discovers that the real reason mysteries stopped arriving is that Snoop Dogg (as himself) has assembled his own, far superior mystery solving operation with his own team that includes Ross Matthews (as himself) and a mountain lion. Snoop insists that he's not doing the same thing as Mike, because what he investigates are not mysteries but "unsolved situations". When a member of Snoop's team disappears, he summons Mike for help, forcing Mike to reunite the Mystery Team to help his friend. Guest starring James Hong.
23	13	"Losin' It"	Ethan Spaulding	David Hoffman, Hugh Davidson, Larry Dorf, and Rachel Ramras	May 1, 2016	1.248
Mike and the team recount how they helped an obese man (Steve Little) lose weight. Guest starring Jeremy Rowley and Lynne Marie Stewart.
24	14	"Yves Klein Blues"	Ethan Spaulding	Hugh Davidson, Larry Dorf, and Rachel Ramras	May 8, 2016	1.168
Mike, the Team, and their pool guy Terry (Rhys Darby), travel first to Paris, then to Brasília searching for a rare blue pigment needed to make Mike a new track suit. Guest starring Maya Rudolph.
25	15	"Unholy Matrimony"	Jeff Siergey	Hugh Davidson, Larry Dorf, and Rachel Ramras	May 15, 2016	1.154
Wealthy couple Walter and Bitsy Morgan (Alan Thicke and Mindy Sterling) ask Mike to investigate their daughter's fiancé Rick. At the wedding ceremony, Rick is abducted by humanoid animals. Walter confesses to years of bestiality, resulting in an enclave of half human creatures living on the Morgans' private island. Rick more closely resembles a true human than any of Walter's other hybrid children where his mother is a Yorkshire pig. The Morgans' daughter (Laurel Coppock) weds Rick despite Marquess' concern that they are half-siblings.
26	16	"Mystery for Hire"	Ethan Spaulding	Hugh Davidson, Larry Dorf, and Rachel Ramras	May 22, 2016	1.334
A bank hires the Team, but not for the reason the Team thinks. Guest starring Scott Beehner, Jordan Black, Allison Dunbar, and Annie Sertich.
27	17	"The Bard's Curse"	Jeff Siergey	Hugh Davidson, Larry Dorf, and Rachel Ramras	May 29, 2016	1.080
A flamboyant Shakespearean-theater director Bruce McCulloch believes he's cursed, and contacts the Mystery Team. Mike and the Team drive to Vermont (from their home in Las Vegas) to investigate. Guest starring Ana Gasteyer.
28	18	"Save Me!"	Jeff Siergey	Hugh Davidson, Larry Dorf, and Rachel Ramras	June 5, 2016	1.023
Will (Nat Faxon), Yung Hee's Christian friend, wants to save her from The Rapture.
29	19	"The Farmer's Daughter (Parts 1&2)"	Jeff Siergey	Hugh Davidson, Larry Dorf, and Rachel Ramras	June 12, 2016	1.305
30	20	"The Farmer's Daughter (Parts 1&2)"	Jeff Siergey	Hugh Davidson, Larry Dorf, and Rachel Ramras	June 12, 2016	1.305
Mike Tyson's group visit the red states to help a farmer obtain an anniversary gift for his wife. After Mike's van breaks down, he, Yung Hee, Marquess, and Pigeon stay in the farmhouse for the night. While there, Pigeon encounters the farmer's daughter (Rachael Harris) who the farmer claims is "dead." Guest starring Cheryl Hines and Kevin Kirkpatrick. Note: This is the only half hour episode of the series.

=== Season 3 (2017–18) ===
No. overall	No. in season	Title	Directed by	Written by	Original release date	US viewers (millions)
31	1	"Help a Brother Out"	Jeff Siergey	Hugh Davidson, Larry Dorf, and Rachel Ramras	May 14, 2017	1.349
After his house burns down, Mike and the team must look for a place to stay, making sure to avoid Mike's agent Deezy's house since it's trashed.
32	2	"The Beginning"	Jeff Siergey	Hugh Davidson, Larry Dorf, and Rachel Ramras	May 21, 2017	1.140
Mike remembers to when the team solved their first mystery. In a long flashback to 2001 (which has a '70s feel) the team goes to Washington D.C. and visits the White House, and Mike meets President George W. Bush.
33	3	"Love Letters"	Jeff Siergey	Hugh Davidson, Larry Dorf, and Rachel Ramras	May 28, 2017	0.911
The Team attends a yard sale, and Mike buys several items, including an old desk. A drawer contains the lost love letters.
34	4	"All About That Bass"	Jeff Siergey	Hugh Davidson, Larry Dorf, and Rachel Ramras	June 4, 2017	1.163
A professional bass fisherman accuses a competitor of cheating, and hires the Team to prove it.
35	5	"Foxcroft Academy for Boys"	Jeff Siergey	Hugh Davidson, Larry Dorf, and Rachel Ramras	June 11, 2017	1.122
The team visits an exclusive New England all-boys boarding school and tries to locate a missing first-year student.
36	6	"A Mine Is a Terrible Thing to Waste"	Jeff Siergey	Hugh Davidson, Larry Dorf, and Rachel Ramras	June 18, 2017	1.073
Deezy's niece interns with the Mystery Team as they travel to Arizona to help two inept politicians with the ribbon-cutting ceremony to open a new Museum of the History of Mining.
37	7	"Broken Wings"	Jeff Siergey	Hugh Davidson, Larry Dorf, and Rachel Ramras	June 25, 2017	1.128
Pigeon is injured and must recuperate.
38	8	"Ring of Fire"	Jeff Siergey	Hugh Davidson, Larry Dorf, and Rachel Ramras	July 2, 2017	1.047
A man hires the Team to help him look for his missing wedding ring.
39	9	"Mystery on Wall Street"	Jeff Siergey	Hugh Davidson, Larry Dorf, and Rachel Ramras	July 9, 2017	1.168
In New York City a group of Wall Street executives ask the team to investigate possible manipulation of the market.
40	10	"A Dog's Life"	David Maximo	Hugh Davidson, Larry Dorf, and Rachel Ramras	July 16, 2017	1.250
The team travels to San Francisco where a young widowed woman's dog won't accept her new boyfriend. Marquees jumps to the conclusion that the dog is her dead husband reincarnated.
41	11	"Spring Break"	David Maximo	Hugh Davidson, Larry Dorf, and Rachel Ramras	March 4, 2018	0.988
Yung goes to Miami for Spring Break while Mike, Marquess and Pigeon head down to Cuba for a new mystery.
42	12	"At the Car Wash"	Jeff Siergey	Hugh Davidson, Larry Dorf, and Rachel Ramras	March 11, 2018	1.204
The Mystery Team meets a young woman at a car wash. She is pregnant by her automaton boyfriend Adam. A mystery ensues.
43	13	"Thy Neighbor's Life"	David Maximo	Hugh Davidson, Larry Dorf, and Rachel Ramras	March 18, 2018	1.123
The team remains in suburban Las Vegas. Mike gets them invited to dinner at their neighbors' house, where poor WiFi reception is the first clue for solving a mystery.
44	14	"My Favorite Mystery"	David Maximo	Hugh Jackson, Larry Dorf, and Rachel Ramras	March 25, 2018	1.060
The Mystery Team become trapped in an elevator and remember their favorite mysteries.
45	15	"Tyson of Arabia"	Jeff Siergey	Hugh Davidson, Larry Dorf, and Rachel Ramras	April 8, 2018	1.188
The Mystery Team travels to the middle east where the attempt to treat the Prince's enlarged prostate. Marquess dresses as Egyptian goddess Isis and is mistaken as a supporter of ISIS.
46	16	"Carol"	Jeff Siergey	Hugh Davidson, Larry Dorf, and Rachel Ramras	April 15, 2018	1.054
A lonely middle-aged woman named Carol is harassed by an alleged secret admirer in her dreary suburban office cubicle farm. She asks the MTMT for help.
47	17	"Mike Tysonland"	Jeff Siergey	Hugh Davidson, Larry Dorf, and Rachel Ramras	April 22, 2018	1.002
Carol, from the previous episode, makes her second appearance. Mike and the team goes to the American West, where Mike owns some desert wasteland. They are confronted by a strange gun-toting hillbilly family.
48	18	"The Gift"	Jeff Siergey	Hugh Davidson, Larry Dorf, and Rachel Ramras	April 29, 2018	1.003
Mike and the team search for a gift for businessman Jonathan Bowman’s wife and while doing so discover an old photograph at an antique shop. This leads Marquess to use his "go-back" taking the team back in time to right the wrongs of his own past. In 19th century London they meet Marquess' son "Bosie", famed poet Oscar Wilde and the young Hitler family.
49	19	"The Real Bitches of Newport Beach"	David Maximo and Jeff Siergey	Hugh Davidson, Larry Dorf, and Rachel Ramras	May 6, 2018	1.109
In a spoof parody of The Real Housewives, the mystery team travels to Newport Beach to solve the mystery of a missing invitation to a high society charity ball.
50	20	"The Pigeon Has Come Home to Roost"	Jeff Siergey	Hugh Davidson, Larry Dorf, and Rachel Ramras	May 13, 2018	0.923
In the season three finale, Pigeon returns to human form and we learn about his earlier life and deeds. The team gets a new member, a new theme song, and a new name.

=== Season 4 (2019–20) ===
No. overall	No. in season	Title	Directed by	Written by	Original release date	US viewers (millions)
51	1	"Time to Fly"	Jeff Siergey	Story by : Hugh Davidson, Larry Dorf & Rachel Ramras and Jeremy Rowley; Teleplay by : Hugh Davidson, Larry Dorf, and Rachel Ramras	June 30, 2019	0.538
When a very rich, very old man vanishes, everyone suspects his very hot, very young wife.
52	2	"Make a Wish and Blow"	Jeff Siergey	Hugh Davidson, Larry Dorf, and Rachel Ramras	June 30, 2019	0.491
To make a little girl's wish come true, Marquess leads the team to the Wishing Well in Fantasy Forest.
53	3	"The Bucket List"	Jeff Siergey	Hugh Davidson, Larry Dorf, and Rachel Ramras	July 7, 2019	0.488
Mike has a No. 1 item on his bucket list.
54	4	"The Missing Package"	Jeff Siergey	Hugh Davidson, Larry Dorf, and Rachel Ramras	July 7, 2019	0.462
Sometimes it's not as easy as ordering online. The team travels to Chicago's financial district to solve the mystery of a misdirected delivery.
55	5	"Pits and Peaks"	Jeff Siergey	Hugh Davidson, Larry Dorf, and Rachel Ramras	July 14, 2019	0.631
The team shares its highs and lows of the day around the dinner table, and it also goes to Scotland.
56	6	"The Monahans and MacGoverns"	Jeff Siergey	Hugh Davidson, Larry Dorf, and Rachel Ramras	July 14, 2019	0.569
The team travels to Wyoming, where star-crossed young lovers from feuding rancher-families ask the team for help.
57	7	"The Death of Lyle Victor Linkus"	Jeff Siergey	Hugh Davidson, Larry Dorf, and Rachel Ramras	July 21, 2019	0.569
The death penalty debate is settled once and for all, when the team is tasked with recapturing an escaped Georgia death-row inmate.
58	8	"San Juan Puerto Rico Blows but San Juan Capistrano..."	Jeff Siergey	Hugh Davidson, Larry Dorf, and Rachel Ramras	July 21, 2019	0.551
The mystery begins because the swallows do not return to San Juan Capistrano. The team mistakenly fly to San Juan, Puerto Rico, then crash in the Bermuda Triangle. When they awake they meet L. Ron Hubbard (voiced by Jeff Bergman) and solve the mystery of the missing swallows.
59	9	"The Yung and the Restless"	Jeff Siergey	Hugh Davidson, Larry Dorf, and Rachel Ramras	July 28, 2019	0.598
Yung Hee wonders if being on a mystery team is what she wants to do with her life.
60	10	"A Mystery in Little Italy"	Jeff Siergey	Hugh Davidson, Larry Dorf, and Rachel Ramras	July 28, 2019	0.583
What to do with baby octopus, plantains, smoked kippers and cream of mushroom soup? The team travels to New York City where Mike is a contestant in a Celebrity Chef competition with two other famous retired athletes.
61	11	"The Christmas Episode"	Jeff Siergey	Hugh Davidson, Larry Dorf, and Rachel Ramras	December 10, 2019	0.521
The team travels to a nursing home to assist an elderly man. His adult daughter wants the team to take him to Oregon to seek euthanasia, only to cause unexpected truths to come to light.
62	12	"The Gift That Keeps on Giving"	Jeff Siergey	Hugh Davidson, Larry Dorf, and Rachel Ramras	January 13, 2020	0.697
The team is drawn into a conflict of one-upsmanship between two families over their thank you gifts to each other, leading to tragedy.
63	13	"Your Old Man"	Jeff Siergey	Hugh Davidson, Larry Dorf, and Rachel Ramras	January 13, 2020	0.627
Pigeon is confronted with his own mortality. He reveals that years ago he fathered a child that he has never met. Marquess and Pigeon seek and find this offspring, and discover that there are actually twins!
64	14	"Let's Make a Deal"	Jeff Siergey	Hugh Davidson, Larry Dorf, and Rachel Ramras	January 20, 2020	0.674
When Deezy arranges a podcast session for the team, they uncover a demonic backmasked message in the resulting recording.
65	15	"Pilot Error"	Jeff Siergey	Hugh Davidson, Larry Dorf, and Rachel Ramras	January 20, 2020	0.609
The team must help an airplane pilot resolve a Sexting misunderstanding.
66	16	"Shop 'Til You Drop"	Jeff Siergey	Hugh Davidson, Larry Dorf, and Rachel Ramras	January 26, 2020	0.647
The team's grocery shopping is interrupted when they have to solve a murder mystery.
67	17	"Landon's End"	Jeff Siergey	Hugh Davidson, Larry Dorf, and Rachel Ramras	February 9, 2020	0.554
A widower father assumes that his son is addicted to Painkillers.
68	18	"The Stein Way"	Jeff Siergey	Hugh Davidson, Larry Dorf, and Rachel Ramras	February 9, 2020	0.510
Mike's attorney has a mystery that needs to be solved. So the team visits a Cryonics lab and encounter a Frankenstein-like monster.
69	19	"Clam Bam Thank You Ma'am"	Jeff Siergey	Hugh Davidson, Larry Dorf, and Rachel Ramras	February 16, 2020	0.685
The team travels to New England and meet brothers Matt, Pat, and Nat O'Sullivan. They work to find a way to save the brothers' failing seaside clam shack in Marblehead, Mass.
70	20	"You Can't Go Home Again"	Jeff Siergey	Hugh Davidson, Larry Dorf, and Rachel Ramras	February 16, 2020	0.629
In the series finale, Marquess is finally been approved to become an angel, but he must leave the team in order to earn his wings. All is for nothing though; Mike kills God.

== Ratings ==
Mike Tyson Mysteries : U.S. viewers per episode (millions)

Season	Episode number																			
Season	1	2	3	4	5	6	7	8	9	10	11	12	13	14	15	16	17	18	19	20
1	1.01	0.97	0.97	0.89	1.35	1.56	1.69	1.55	1.67	1.53	–									
2	0.86	0.98	1.03	0.94	1.00	1.02	1.01	1.09	1.08	1.49	1.195	1.320	1.248	1.168	1.154	1.334	1.080	1.023	1.305	1.305
3	1.349	1.140	0.911	1.163	1.122	1.073	1.128	1.047	1.168	1.250	0.988	1.204	1.123	1.060	1.188	1.054	1.002	1.003	1.109	0.923
4	0.538	0.491	0.488	0.462	0.631	0.569	0.569	0.551	0.598	0.583	0.521	0.697	0.627	0.674	0.609	0.647	0.554	0.510	0.685	0.629

Audience measurement performed by Nielsen Media Research
