= Jim Rash =

American actor and filmmaker (born 1971)

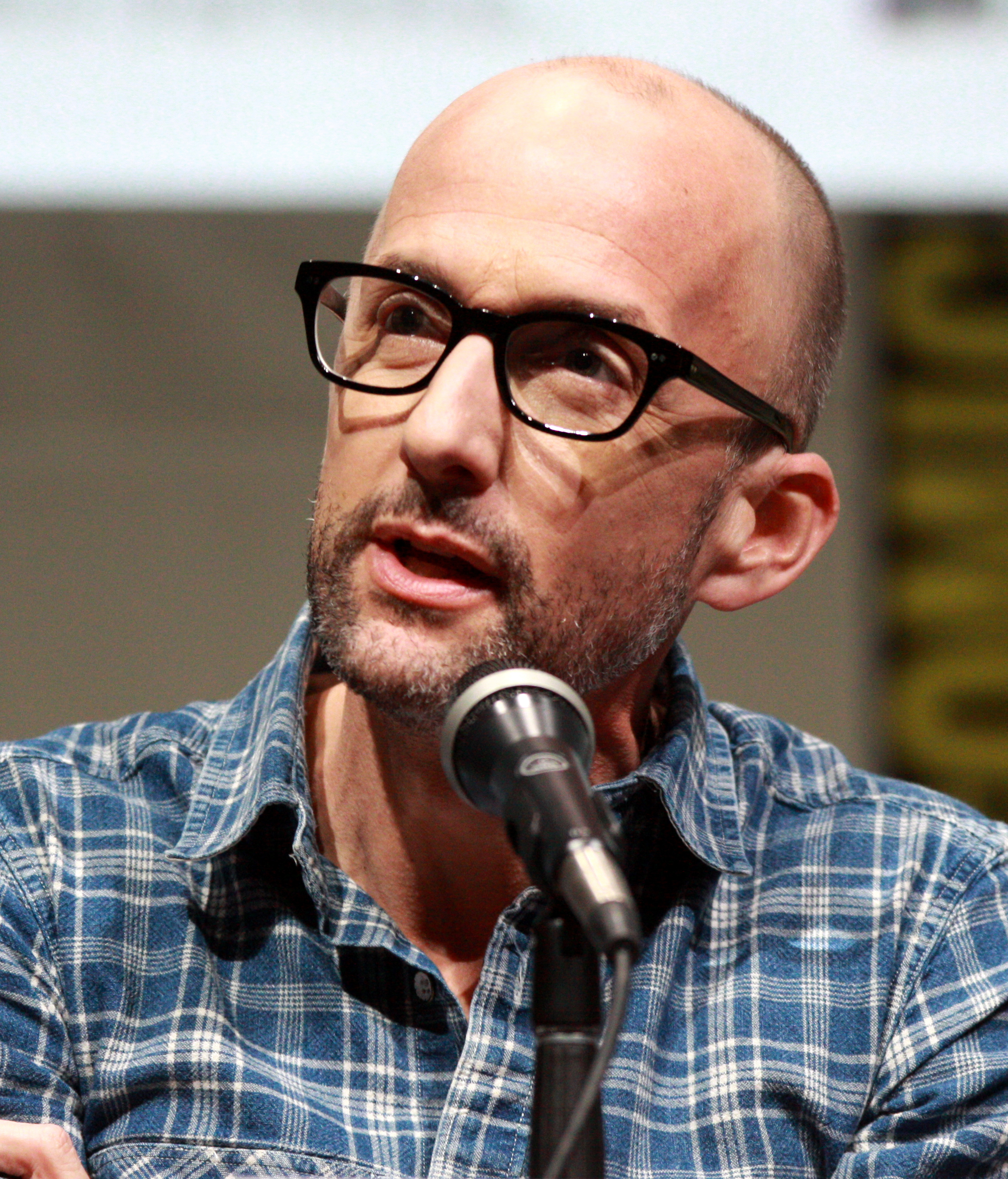
- Rash in 2013
- Born: James Rash; July 15, 1971 (age 55); Charlotte, North Carolina, U.S.
- Occupations: Actor; comedian; filmmaker
- Years active: 1995–present

James Rash (born July 15, 1971) is an American actor, comedian, and filmmaker. He played Dean Craig Pelton on the NBC sitcom Community (2009–2015), for which he was nominated for the Critics' Choice Television Award for Best Supporting Actor in a Comedy Series in 2012.

He co-wrote The Descendants (2011) alongside Alexander Payne and Nat Faxon for which they received the Academy Award, Independent Spirit Award and Writers Guild of America Award for Best Adapted Screenplay. They were also nominated for the BAFTA Award, Golden Globe Award, and Critics' Choice Movie Award. Rash has since, with Faxon, written and directed the comedy films The Way, Way Back (2013), and Downhill (2020).

== Early life ==
Rash grew up in Charlotte, North Carolina. Both he and his sister were adopted. He attended Charlotte Latin School. After graduating, he spent a post-graduate year at the Lawrenceville School in Lawrenceville, New Jersey.

He graduated from the University of North Carolina at Chapel Hill in 1994.

== Career ==
Rash played Mr. Grayson/Stitches in the 2005 film Sky High, Fenton on That '70s Show and That '90s Show, and Andrew the "whore house guy" on Reno 911!. He appeared in the final episode of Friends, and played Head T.A. Philip in Slackers. From 2009 to 2015, Rash starred on Community as Craig Pelton, the dean of the community college in which the show takes place.

Rash and comedy partner Nat Faxon moved into screenwriting with a pilot in 2005 for a series entitled Adopted, which did not take off. They wrote the screenplay for The Descendants (2011), based on the novel of the same name, which appeared on the 2008 edition of the Black List (the most popular unproduced scripts in Hollywood at that time). The film was released to critical acclaim, receiving a Golden Globe nomination and winning the Academy Award for Best Adapted Screenplay.

Both Rash and Faxon co-wrote and co-directed the film The Way Way Back (2013), which received a standing ovation at its premiere at the Sundance Film Festival. Parts of the film are based on Rash's teenage life. The ensemble comedy starred Steve Carell, Toni Collette, Allison Janney, Maya Rudolph, and Sam Rockwell. The film was a success, earning a Critics' Choice Movie Award for Best Comedy nomination.

In 2020, Rash and Faxon reunited for Downhill, an adaptation of the film Force Majeure (2014) by Swedish director Ruben Östlund. The film starred Will Ferrell and Julia Louis-Dreyfus. Rash and Faxon co-wrote the script with Jesse Armstrong. The film debuted at the Sundance Film Festival where it received mixed reviews, with critics comparing the film to the original.

Rash has voiced the Marquess of Queensberry for all four seasons of the Adult Swim animated comedy Mike Tyson Mysteries. From 2017 to 2021, he voiced Gyro Gearloose in the reboot of DuckTales. In 2023, Rash voiced the Fixer, the enforcer for the Conglomerate and recurring character in My Dad the Bounty Hunter. He also voiced a video game announcer in the same series. In 2026, he voiced the character Special Agent Francis O'Doyle in the animated series President Curtis.

In 2026, Rash wrote and directed Miss You, Love You starring Allison Janney and Andrew Rannells.

== Personal life ==
Rash is gay. During a September 2022 interview promoting Bros, he stated he came out "well over 10-plus years ago".

== Filmography ==
=== Film ===
Year	Title	Role	Notes
2000	Auto Motives	Accountant	
2002	Hiding in Walls	Jane's Assistant	
2002	One Hour Photo	Amateur Porn Guy	
2002	Slackers	Head T.A. Philip	
2002	Minority Report	Technician	
2002	S1m0ne	Studio Executive	
2003	Wrong Hollywood Number	Caller	Short film
2003	George & Gracie	George	
2005	Sky High	Mr. Grayson/Stitches	
2007	Smiley Face	Talent Agency Secretary	
2007	Balls of Fury	Techie	
2008	The Onion Movie	Bryce's Manager	
2009	The Slammin' Salmon	Disgruntled Businessman	
2011	The Descendants	—N/a	Co-writer
2013	The Way Way Back	Lewis	Also co-writer, co-director and executive producer
2014	Yellowbird	Karl	Voice
2015	Looney Tunes: Rabbits Run	Cecil Turtle	Voice, direct-to-video
2016	Captain America: Civil War	Professor Wilkes	Cameo; credited as "M.I.T. Liaison"
2017	Thoroughbreds	—N/a	Producer
2017	Bernard and Huey	Bernard	
2019	Red Shoes and the Seven Dwarfs	Prince Average	Voice
2020	Downhill	—N/a	Co-director and co-writer
2020	Lazy Susan	Phil	
2021	Long Weekend	Larry	
2021	Home Sweet Home Alone	Bell Choir Leader	
2022	Bros	Robert	
2024	Fly Me to the Moon	Lance Vespertine	
2026	Miss You, Love You	—N/a	Director, writer

=== Television ===
Year	Title	Role	Notes
1995	Cybill	Production Assistant	Episode: "Local Hero"
1997	Tracey Takes On...	Pollster	Episode: "Movies"
1997–98	The Naked Truth	Harris Van Doren	3 episodes
1998	Working	Carl	Episode: "Good Val Hunting"
1999	Becker	Eddie Blatt	Episode: "Becker the Elder"
1999	Clueless	Bart	Episode: "Big Sissies"
1999	Katie Joplin	Mitchell Tuit	7 episodes
1999	Thanks	Cotton	6 episodes
2000	The Hughleys	Census Guy	Episode: "Scary Hughleys"
2001	Loomis	Derek	Pilot
2001	The Practice	Quimby	Episode: "Vanished: Part 1"
2002	Less Than Perfect	Rob McLyle	Episode: "Claude the Liar"
2002–06	That '70s Show	Fenton	6 episodes
2003	Alligator Point		Pilot
2003	CSI: Crime Scene Investigation	Todd Benton	Episode: "Random Acts of Violence"
2003	The Guardian	Court Therapist	Episode: "All the Rage"
2003	Baby Bob	Dougy	Episode: "Reality Bites"
2003	Coupling	Stalker	Episode: "Check/Mate"
2003–09, 2020	Reno 911!	Andrew	15 episodes
2004	Friends	Nervous Passenger on Plane	Episode: "The Last One"
2004	Grim & Evil	Various	Voice, Episode: "A Kick in the Asgard"
2004	NCIS	Dr. Joel Sanderson	Episode: "Left For Dead"
2005	Will & Grace	Brent	Episode: "Love is in the Airplane"
2005	Jake in Progress	Freddie Blake	Episode: "Rivals and Departures"
2005	Adopted		Pilot; co-creator and executive producer
2006	Saturday Night Live		Guest writer on episode "Dane Cook / The Killers"
2006–07	Help Me Help You	Jonathan	14 episodes
2008	Hackett		Pilot
2008	Eli Stone	Bradley Kitsis	Episode: "I Want Your Sex"
2008	Samantha Who?	Artist	Episode: "The Gallery Show"
2009, 2016	American Dad!	Bouncer, Puddin'	Voice, 2 episodes
2009–15	Community	Dean Craig Pelton	90 episodes; also wrote "Basic Human Anatomy" co-directed 2 episodes
2010	Open Books	Kyle	Pilot
2011	Worst. Prom. Ever.	Pizza Pete	Television film
2011–14	The Soup	Various roles	7 episodes
2012	Scooby-Doo! Mystery Incorporated	JR Kipple	Voice, episode: "The Night the Clown Cried II - Tears of Doom"
2012	The High Fructose Adventures of Annoying Orange	Pineapple Joe	Voice, episode: "Follow the Bouncing Orange"
2012–13	The Looney Tunes Show	Cecil Turtle	Voice, 2 episodes
2012–15	Randy Cunningham: 9th Grade Ninja	Principal Slimovitz	Voice, 34 episodes
2013–14	The Writers' Room	Himself (host)	12 episodes; also producer
2013–14	TripTank	Tony, Sir Ruthert, Cowboy Dad	Voice, 3 episodes
2013, 2015	Comedy Bang! Bang!	Various roles	2 episodes
2014–15	Glee	Lee Paulblatt	2 episodes
2014–20	Mike Tyson Mysteries	Marquess of Queensberry	Main voice role
2015–16	Jake and the Never Land Pirates	Sinker	Voice, 2 episodes
2015	Rick and Morty	Glaxo Slimslom	Voice, episode: "Big Trouble In Little Sanchez"
2016	Dr. Ken	Devon Drake	Episode: "Ken's an Expert Witness"
2016	Lucifer	Richard Kester	Episode: "Et Tu, Doctor?"
2016	The Odd Couple	Joshua Norwall	Episode: "Chess Nuts"
2016	The Grinder	Bill Foosley	Episode: "The Retooling of Dean Sanderson"
2016	Black-ish	Cody	Episode: "VIP"
2017	Girlboss	Mobias	4 episodes
2017	SuperMansion	NASA Scientist	Voice, episode: "Blazarmageddon"
2017	Animals.	Chuckles	Voice, episode: "Cats Part I"
2017	Nobodies	Himself	5 episodes
2017	Curb Your Enthusiasm	Hotel Day Manager	Episode: "The Pickle Gambit"
2017	Beyond Stranger Things	Himself (host)	7 episodes
2017	Superior Donuts	Mr. Mathers	Episode: "Error of Admission"
2017–21	DuckTales	Gyro Gearloose, Bulby, Gizmoduck Armor	Voice, 14 episodes
2017, 2021	Vampirina	Mr. Thornberg	Voice, 2 episodes
2018, 2024	Blaze and the Monster Machines	Grandpa Pickle	Voice, 2 episodes
2018	Great News	Fenton Pelt	2 episodes
2018	Big City Greens	Ted	Voice, episode: "Fill Bill"
2018	The Epic Tales of Captain Underpants	Mr. Jerry Citizen	Voice, episode: "Captain Underpants and the Jarring Jerkiness of the Judge J.O.R.T.S."
2018	Angie Tribeca	Philip Grammbbowski	Episode: "Trader Joes"
2018–20	Star Wars Resistance	Flix, Pirate	Voice, 13 episodes
2019–25	Harley Quinn	Edward Nygma/Riddler, various voices	Voice, 17 episodes
2020	Brooklyn Nine-Nine	Dr. Darren Watkins	Episode: "Pimemento"
2020	Archibald's Next Big Thing	Fritz	Episode: "Impromptu Cruise"
2020–21	American Housewife	Walker Montgomery	6 episodes
2021	Impeachment: American Crime Story	Ken Bacon	4 episodes
2021–23	Tacoma FD	CEO Frank Drake	2 episodes
2021–25	Solar Opposites	Keith, Lance, Waiter	Voice, 2 episodes
2022	The Woman in the House Across the Street from the Girl in the Window	Flight Attendant	Episode: "Episode 8"
2022	Out of Office	Edward	Television film
2023	My Dad the Bounty Hunter	Fixer, various voices	Voice, recurring role
2023	The Ghost and Molly McGee	JR	Voice, episode: "Dance Dad Revolution"
2023–25	Krapopolis	Dionysus	Voice, 4 episodes
2023–24	That '90s Show	Fenton	2 episodes
2023–24	Velma	Mayor Dave	Voice, 6 episodes
2023–24	Baby Shark's Big Show!	Bentley, Beard	Voice, 4 episodes
2024	Loot	Emil	Episode: "Mally's"
2024	Kite Man: Hell Yeah!	Edward Nygma / Riddler	Voice, episode: "Pilot, Hell Yeah!"
2025	Ironheart	Professor Wilkes	Episode: "Take Me Home"
2025	Ballard	Leo	3 episodes
2025	Haunted Hotel	Additional voices	Voice, episode: "Ghost Hunters!"
2025–26	Abbott Elementary	Thomas	3 episodes
2025–26	Chibiverse	Gyro Gearloose	Voice, 2 episodes
2026	Shifting Gears	Damien	Episode: "Friend"
2026	Strip Law		3 episodes
2026	Animal Control	Arnie	Episode: "Squirrels and Fat Cats"
2026–present	President Curtis	Special Agent Francis O'Doyle	Voice

== Awards and nominations ==
Year	Association	Category	Project	Result	Ref.
2011	Academy Award	Best Adapted Screenplay	The Descendants	Won	
2011	BAFTA Award	Best Adapted Screenplay	The Descendants	Nominated	
2011	Golden Globe Award	Best Screenplay	The Descendants	Nominated	
2011	Independent Spirit Award	Best Screenplay	The Descendants	Won	
2011	Writers Guild of America Award	Best Adapted Screenplay	The Descendants	Won	
2011	Critics' Choice Movie Award	Best Adapted Screenplay	The Descendants	Nominated	
2012	Critics' Choice Television Award	Best Supporting Actor in a Comedy Series	Community	Nominated	
2014	Primetime Emmy Award	Outstanding Informational Series or Special	The Writers' Room	Nominated	
