= Nobodies (TV series) =

- Genre: Comedy
- Created by: Hugh Davidson; Larry Dorf; Rachel Ramras
- Written by: Hugh Davidson; Larry Dorf; Rachel Ramras
- Story by: Hugh Davidson; Larry Dorf; Rachel Ramras; Michael McDonald
- Directed by: Michael McDonald; Ben Falcone (pilot)
- Starring: Hugh Davidson; Larry Dorf; Rachel Ramras
- Country of origin: United States
- Original language: English
- No. of seasons: 2
- No. of episodes: 24

Production
- Executive producers: Hugh Davidson; Larry Dorf; Rachel Ramras; Ben Falcone; Melissa McCarthy; Michael McDonald; Tony Hernandez
- Camera setup: Single-camera
- Running time: 22 minutes
- Production companies: Jax Media; On the Day Productions

Original release
- Network: TV Land; Paramount Network (2018)
- Release: March 29, 2017 – May 31, 2018

Nobodies is an American comedy television series created by Hugh Davidson, Larry Dorf and Rachel Ramras, and produced by Ben Falcone and Melissa McCarthy. The series also starred Davidson, Dorf and Ramras. The series premiered on TV Land on March 29, 2017. The second season premiered on Paramount Network on March 29, 2018. On June 23, 2018, Nobodies was cancelled after two seasons by TV Land.

== Plot ==
Groundlings members Hugh, Larry and Rachel are three actor/comedians still waiting for their big break, struggling to make a name for themselves in Hollywood while their friends achieve fame and fortune. They're the Nobodies.

== Cast ==
=== Main ===
- Hugh Davidson as a fictionalized version of himself
- Larry Dorf as a fictionalized version of himself
- Rachel Ramras as a fictionalized version of herself

=== Guest stars ===
Celebrity guest stars who appear as themselves throughout the series include: Melissa McCarthy, Ben Falcone, Jason Bateman, Kristen Bell, Stephanie Courtney, Nat Faxon, Cheryl Hines, Allison Janney, Annie Mumolo, Bob Odenkirk, Jim Rash, Maya Rudolph, Sia, Michaela Watkins and Kristen Wiig.

== Production ==
On June 2, 2016, the series was picked up for a first season. On January 13, 2017, the series was renewed for a second season. On November 15, 2017, it was announced that the series would move to TV Land's sister network Paramount Network, starting with the second season, which premiered on March 29, 2018. It returned to TV Land after two weeks.

== Episodes ==
With the exception of the pilot, all episodes were written by Hugh Davidson, Larry Dorf, Rachel Ramras & Michael McDonald with the teleplay by Hugh Davidson, Larry Dorf, Rachel Ramras and directed by Michael McDonald. The pilot was only written by Hugh Davidson, Larry Dorf, Rachel Ramras and directed by Ben Falcone.

=== Series overview ===
Season	Episodes	Originally released	
Season	Episodes	First released	Last released
1	12	March 29, 2017	June 21, 2017
2	12	March 29, 2018	May 31, 2018

=== Season 1 (2017) ===
No. overall	No. in season	Title	Original release date	US viewers (millions)
1	1	"Mr. First Lady"	March 29, 2017	0.425
2	2	"The Rat, the Cheese and the Trap"	April 5, 2017	0.356
3	3	"Seeing Someone"	April 12, 2017	0.331
4	4	"Call My Agent"	April 19, 2017	0.385
5	5	"Not the Emmys"	April 26, 2017	0.320
6	6	"Too Much of a Good Thing"	May 3, 2017	0.369
7	7	"Heavy Heart, Heavy Hands"	May 10, 2017	0.353
8	8	"The Gilded Cage"	May 17, 2017	0.308
9	9	"Devil in a Red Dress"	May 24, 2017	0.413
10	10	"The Pledge"	May 31, 2017	0.385
11	11	"Paul's Muse"	June 14, 2017	0.364
12	12	"Bring Out the Champagne"	June 21, 2017	0.365

=== Season 2 (2018) ===
No. overall	No. in season	Title	Original release date	US viewers (millions)
13	1	"Open Dorf Policy"	March 29, 2018	0.464
14	2	"Swimmin Pools, TV Stars"	March 29, 2018	0.331
15	3	"Page One Rewrite"	April 5, 2018	0.483
16	4	"Driven Insane"	April 12, 2018	0.390
17	5	"Double Fault"	April 19, 2018	0.389
18	6	"Kristen's Wiig"	April 26, 2018	0.441
19	7	"Sex, Drugs and Melissa McCarthy"	May 3, 2018	0.402
20	8	"Tape Night"	May 10, 2018	0.395
21	9	"Rob in the Hood"	May 17, 2018	0.5
22	10	"Alone Star State"	May 24, 2018	0.468
23	11	"Getting a Sign"	May 31, 2018	0.32
24	12	"Meeting Steven Spielberg"	May 31, 2018	0.25

== Reception ==
=== Critical response ===
Nobodies has received positive reviews from critics. Rotten Tomatoes awarded the series with a rating of 70% based on reviews from 10 critics and an average rating of 6.0 out of 10. On Metacritic, the series received a score of 60% based on reviews from 12 critics, indicating "mixed or average reviews".

Nobodies made its pre-television premiere at the SXSW Festival, and received early praise. Variety TV critic Sonia Saraiya called it funny and original, writing, "The show succeeds because of how fully it comes down on its three leads, who separately and together are not much above using any possible in to get their projects made."

=== Ratings ===
==== Season 1 (2017) ====
Viewership and ratings per episode of Nobodies
No.	Title	Air date	Rating (18–49)	Viewers (millions)
1	"Mr. First Lady"	March 29, 2017	0.09	0.425
2	"The Rat, the Cheese and the Trap"	April 5, 2017	0.08	0.356
3	"Seeing Someone"	April 12, 2017	0.06	0.331
4	"Call My Agent"	April 19, 2017	0.06	0.385
5	"Not the Emmys"	April 26, 2017	0.05	0.32
6	"Too Much of a Good Thing"	May 3, 2017	0.07	0.369
7	"Heavy Heart, Heavy Hands"	May 10, 2017	0.06	0.353
8	"The Gilded Cage"	May 17, 2017	0.05	0.308
9	"Devil in a Red Dress"	May 24, 2017	0.09	0.413
10	"The Pledge"	May 31, 2017	0.08	0.385
11	"Paul's Muse"	June 14, 2017	0.06	0.364
12	"Bring Out the Champagne"	June 21, 2017	0.05	0.365

==== Season 2 (2018) ====
Viewership and ratings per episode of Nobodies
No.	Title	Air date	Rating (18–49)	Viewers (millions)
1	"Open Dorf Policy"	March 29, 2018	0.08	0.464
2	"Swimmin Pools, TV Stars"	March 29, 2018	0.06	0.331
3	"Page One Rewrite"	April 5, 2018	0.05	0.36
4	"Driven Insane"	April 12, 2018	0.07	0.39
5	"Double Fault"	April 19, 2018	0.07	0.389
6	"Kristen's Wiig"	April 26, 2018	0.09	0.441
7	"Sex, Drugs and Melissa McCarthy"	May 3, 2018	0.09	0.402
8	"Tape Night"	May 10, 2018	0.07	0.395
9	"Rob in the Hood"	May 17, 2018	0.11	0.5
10	"Alone Star State"	May 24, 2018	0.11	0.468
11	"Getting a Sign"	May 31, 2018	0.06	0.32
12	"Meeting Steven Spielberg"	May 31, 2018	0.05	0.25
