= Mad (TV series) =

American animated sketch comedy television series

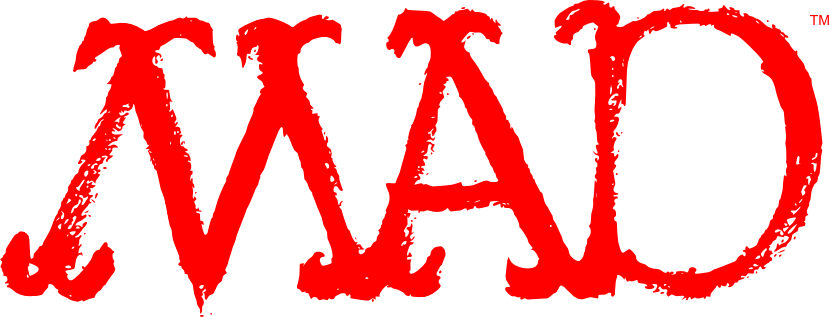
- Genre: Sketch comedy; Surreal humor; Parody; Satire
- Based on: Mad by EC Comics
- Developed by: Kevin Shinick
- Directed by: Aaron Horvath
- Voices of: Kevin Shinick; Hugh Davidson; Mikey Day; Larry Dorf; Rachel Ramras; Gary Anthony Williams
- Theme music composer: Devin Flynn
- Opening theme: "Mad!"
- Composers: Armen Chakmakian; Rony Brack; Devin Flynn; Dean Landon
- Country of origin: United States
- Original language: English
- No. of seasons: 4
- No. of episodes: 103 (207 sketches) (list of episodes)

Production
- Executive producer: Sam Register
- Producers: Kevin Shinick; Mark Marek; Dave Mendel (season 4)
- Editor: Dave Mendel
- Running time: 11 minutes
- Production company: Warner Bros. Animation

Original release
- Network: Cartoon Network
- Release: September 6, 2010 – December 2, 2013

Related
- Mad TV; Robot Chicken

Mad (stylized in all caps) is an American animated sketch comedy television series developed by Kevin Shinick for Cartoon Network. Based on Mad magazine, the series features short animated parodies of television shows, films, video games and celebrities, along with other sketches. It uses a variety of animation styles and features characters and recurring segments from the magazine. The series premiered on Cartoon Network on September 6, 2010, at 8:30 p.m., following the premiere of Regular Show. It ran for four seasons and ended on December 2, 2013.

== Production ==
Mad was produced by Warner Bros. Animation and inspired by the humor magazine of the same name. Kevin Shinick and Mark Marek served as producers, while Sam Register was the executive producer.

Shinick, who previously worked on Robot Chicken, developed the series as an animated sketch comedy show featuring parodies of films, television programs, video games and popular culture. In an interview about the series, Shinick discussed the production process and the challenges of creating its numerous parodies.

== Recurring sketches ==
The series features recurring sketches, including parodies of popular culture, adaptations of features from Mad magazine and original comedy segments.

- A MAD Look Inside – A short piece in which viewers see a magical world inside a celebrity. This only played during Season 1.
- Alfred E. Neuman for President – During the Election of 2012, there were campaigns for Alfred E. Neuman's presidential election.
- Ask the Celebrity – Where various celebrities respond with absurd answers to questions in letters from fans. For example, when Miley Cyrus was asked to tell what she did to put on a good concert performance, she stated that she would rub cats on herself and walk on wool carpeting.
- Bad Idea # – This presents a scenario from the long list of possible bad ideas.
- Celebrities Without Their Make-Up – The segment shows what real and fictional celebrities would look like without their make-up. For example: Zach Galifianakis is Benson from Regular Show, Russell Brand is a wooden nutcracker, Robert Pattinson is Alfred E. Neuman, Iron Man is C-3PO, and SpongeBob SquarePants is a fruitcake.
- Commercials – There are some commercials for fictional items and programs on every episode.
- Dear Reaper – The Grim Reaper reads and replies to letters from children regarding their deaths.
- Don Martin – Adaptations to comics strips by longtime Mad cartoonist Don Martin.
- Drawn-Out Dramas – After one of the primary sketches of the episode concludes, the Mad "wallpaper" will appear and "rip open" to reveal a Sergio Aragonés-style sketch in front of a colored background, often using a version of Alfred E. Neuman in some capacity.
- Gross and Beyond Gross – Showcases the differences between "gross" and "beyond gross".
- MAD News – A newsman delivers recent news. This sketch originally began appearing randomly in the middle of an episode—usually interrupting another sketch. Starting with episode 9, the sketch served as a cold opening for every episode. With Season 3 and the introduction of the MADvent Calendar, it returned to being featured as an interruption.
- MADitorial – An editorial segment starting with episode 5 of Season 4. The sketch is animated by Jorge R. Gutierrez.
- MADucation 101... – Lessons in any subject.
- MADvent Calendar – A series of funny and ridiculous pop culture events that happened recently. Starting with Season 3, the sketch serves as the new cold opening for every episode.
- Mike Wartella – Animations by cartoonist M. Wartella.
- Rejected – A segment revealing rejected ideas within various pop culture properties like Rejected Transformers, Rejected Superheroes, Rejected Audition Tapes, Rejected Pokémon, Rejected Toy Story 3 Characters, Rejected Smurfs, and more.
- Security Cam – A presentation of surveillance footage of things that happens at public places during nightly closing hours. Each video features seemingly supernatural occurrences with the implicit suggestion that such things would never happen during the day.
- Snappy Answers to Stupid Questions – An adaptation of Al Jaffee's reoccurring magazine feature, it features a person who asks a question regarding something that was obviously presented, resulting in the person or people who were so queried to give a sarcastic response that suggests otherwise.
- Spy vs. Spy – An adaptation of the long-running comic series Spy vs. Spy.
- Super-villains for Your... – A parody of the PSA segments from the Super Friends. Here various super-villains from the Legion of Doom present themselves as moral guidance to some child or children. However, being villains, they always manage to swindle, double cross, or betray the children, resulting in their dying at the villain's hand or suffering some unforeseen related event.
- This Day in History – A look at an achievement on the day of the initial broadcast. Most cases it will involve a lesser known person of historical significance doing or coming up with something in the shadow of another well-known historical figure.
- What's Wrong with this Picture? – A game inviting the viewer to recognize something which is incorrect or out-of-place within the picture shown on the screen, but then reveals the correct or least likely things shown to be the expected answer.
- Where's Lady Gaga? – A Where's Wally? type sketch featuring pop superstar Lady Gaga who is hiding at a small-time public function. The viewer is asked to try to find her only to see at the end that she is always cleverly disguised as a prop to blend in perfectly with her surroundings.

== Voice cast ==
=== Principal cast ===
- Kevin Shinick
- Hugh Davidson
- Mikey Day
- Larry Dorf
- Rachel Ramras
- Gary Anthony Williams

=== Guest/other voices ===
- Carlos Alazraqui
- Jason Antoon
- Eric Artell
- Diedrich Bader
- James Barbour
- Josh Beren
- Gregg Berger
- Jeff Bergman
- Bill Farmer
- Gregg Bissonette
- Steve Blum
- Rachel Butera
- Jen Cohn
- Chris Cox
- Daniel Cummings
- Brian T. Delaney
- Grey DeLisle
- Barry Dennen
- John DiMaggio
- Ben Diskin
- Chris Edgerly
- Eden Espinosa
- Keith Ferguson
- Quinton Flynn
- Will Friedle
- Tamara Garfield
- Ralph Garman
- Mark-Paul Gosselaar
- Gilbert Gottfried
- Clare Grant
- Seth Green
- Nikki Griffin
- Melinda Hamilton
- Anthony Hansen
- Whit Hertford
- Aldis Hodge
- Richard Steven Horvitz
- Tom Kane
- Tom Kenny
- Arif S. Kinchen
- Seana Kofoed
- Stan Lee
- Matthew Lillard
- Beth Littleford
- Eric Lopez
- Biz Markie
- Deborah Marlowe
- Jason Marsden
- Julia McIlvaine
- Jim Meskimen
- Breckin Meyer
- Piotr Michael
- Dan Milano
- Shirley Mitchell
- Jason Nash
- Julie Nathanson
- Nolan North
- Jeff Nimoy (credited as Jason Palmer)
- Nicole Parker
- Rob Paulsen
- Christopher "Kid" Reid
- Corinne Reilly
- Peter Renaday
- Kevin Michael Richardson
- Joey Richter
- Elizabeth Rodriguez
- Rico Rodriguez
- Salli Saffioti
- Meredith Salenger
- Ben Schwartz
- Michael Sinterniklaas
- Dana Snyder
- Kath Soucie
- Stephen Stanton
- Brody Stevens
- Tara Strong
- James Patrick Stuart
- Cree Summer
- Catherine Taber
- Fred Tatasciore
- Kirk Thornton
- Ho-Kwan Tse
- Christine Tucci
- Alanna Ubach
- Andrew W.K.
- Windy Wagner
- Audrey Wasilewski
- Michaela Watkins
- Frank Welker
- Scott Whyte
- Billy Dee Williams
- Debra Wilson
- Thomas F. Wilson
- Henry Winkler
- Adam Wylie
- "Weird Al" Yankovic
- Victor Yerrid
- Keone Young
- David Herman
- Jimmi Simpson
- Scott Grimes
- Charlie Day
- Rob McElhenney
- Jerry Minor
- Kaitlin Olson
- Toby Huss
- Mary Elizabeth Ellis
- Curtis Armstrong
- Sam Marin
- John Viener

== Episodes ==
Season	Episodes	Originally released	
Season	Episodes	First released	Last released
1	26	September 6, 2010	June 20, 2011
2	26	August 22, 2011	April 23, 2012
3	26	May 28, 2012	March 4, 2013
4	25	April 1, 2013	December 2, 2013

== Awards and nominations ==
=== 2012 Emmy Awards ===
Outstanding Short Format Animated Program for "Kitchen Nightmares Before Christmas / How I Met Your Mummy" (Nominated)

=== 2012 PAAFTJ Television Awards ===
Best Animated Series (Nominated)

== Home media ==
The first part of the first season was released on DVD on September 20, 2011. The remaining episodes of the first season were released on DVD on January 17, 2012.

== See also ==
- Popzilla
