= Miss You, Love You =

2026 American drama film

- Promotional release poster
- Directed by: Jim Rash
- Written by: Jim Rash
- Produced by: Kevin Walsh; Nat Faxon; Gigi Pritzker; Rachel Shane
- Starring: Allison Janney; Andrew Rannells; Bonnie Hunt; Oscar Nunez; Lisa Schurga; Suzy Nakamura
- Cinematography: Danny Moder
- Edited by: Doc Crotzer
- Music by: Mark Orton
- Production companies: MWM; The Walsh Company; Faxon/Rash Productions
- Distributed by: HBO Films
- Release date: May 29, 2026
- Running time: 97 minutes
- Country: United States
- Language: English

Miss You, Love You is a 2026 American drama film written and directed by Jim Rash. It stars Allison Janney, Andrew Rannells, Bonnie Hunt, Suzy Nakamura, Oscar Nunez and Lisa Schurga.

It was released on May 29, 2026, on HBO Max. The movie was nominated for the Primetime Emmy Award for Outstanding Movie.

== Premise ==
A grieving widow is forced to plan her husband's funeral with her estranged son's "assistant".

== Cast ==
- Allison Janney as Diane Patterson
- Andrew Rannells as Jamie Simms
- Bonnie Hunt as Judith Bibbs
- Oscar Nunez as Minister
- Lisa Schurga as Nance
- Suzy Nakamura as Kathy

== Production ==
In January 2024, it was announced Allison Janney and Andrew Rannells had joined the cast of the film, with Jim Rash directing from a screenplay he wrote. Principal photography commenced in February 2024 in and around Albuquerque, New Mexico.

== Release ==
A secret screening was held at the 2026 Sundance Film Festival for buyers. In April 2026, HBO Films acquired U.S. distribution rights to the film and set it for a May 29, 2026, release. A few days later, it was announced that sales agent Architect would be handling international sales on the film at the Marché du Film.

== Reception ==
On the review aggregator website Rotten Tomatoes, 88% of 25 critics' reviews are positive, with an average rating of 7.4/10. The website's consensus reads: "Miss You, Love You may tread familiar dramatic ground, but its nuanced performances, emotionally honest storytelling, and quietly unconventional central relationship give it a deeply rewarding emotional impact." Metacritic, which uses a weighted average, assigned the film a score of 62 out of 100, based on 8 critics, indicating "generally favorable" reviews.
