= Mike Tyson Mysteries =

American adult animated television series

- From left: Yung Hee Tyson, Mike Tyson, Marquess of Queensberry, and Pigeon.
- Genre: Action; Black comedy; Mystery; Thriller
- Created by: Mike Tyson; Hugh Davidson; Lee Stimmel
- Developed by: Hugh Davidson; Giancarlo Volpe
- Written by: Hugh Davidson; Larry Dorf; Rachel Ramras
- Directed by: Jeff Siergey; Ethan Spaulding; David Maximo
- Voices of: Mike Tyson; Norm Macdonald; Rachel Ramras; Jim Rash
- Composers: Jason Brandt; Walker Martin
- Country of origin: United States
- Original language: English
- No. of seasons: 4
- No. of episodes: 70 (list of episodes)

Production
- Executive producers: Sam Register; Hugh Davidson (Note: Davidson was a producer from seasons 1–3)
- Producers: Jeff Siergey (Note: Siergey is producer from seasons 2–4.); Larry Dorf (Note: Dorf and Ramras are producers from season 4.); Rachel Ramras
- Editors: Dave Mendel; Scott Fuselier; Nick Reczynski
- Running time: 11 minutes
- Production companies: Warner Bros. Animation; Williams Street

Original release
- Network: Adult Swim
- Release: October 27, 2014 – February 16, 2020

Mike Tyson Mysteries is an American adult animated television series, and is the first collaboration between Warner Bros. Animation and Williams Street. It premiered on October 27, 2014 on Cartoon Network's nighttime programming block Adult Swim. The series features Mike Tyson (who co-created the series along with Hugh Davidson and Lee Stimmel) solving mysteries, in the style of I Am the Greatest: The Adventures of Muhammad Ali, Scooby-Doo, Jonny Quest, and Mister T. On December 10, 2014, Adult Swim renewed the series for a second season, which premiered on November 1, 2015. A third season premiered on May 14, 2017, and the fourth and final season premiered on June 30, 2019.

During a May 2020 interview, writer Larry Dorf revealed the show had not been renewed and the fourth season would be its last. Adult Swim has aired reruns as of 2024.

== Premise ==
The show follows the fictional misadventures of boxer/actor Mike Tyson, the ghost of the Marquess of Queensberry, Tyson's adopted daughter, and a talking pigeon, as they solve mysteries around the world. The style of the show borrows heavily from the 1983–86 Ruby-Spears production, Mister T, featuring actor/wrestler Mr. T as himself, and 1970s Hanna-Barbera productions such as Scooby-Doo, Where Are You! and The Funky Phantom. Targeted at a much older demographic than those children-oriented cartoons, the show contains adult language and concepts in the manner of Family Guy, South Park, and many other Adult Swim shows. While each episode involves a mystery as a framing device, they are often ignored entirely while the plot takes a completely different (and often oddball) direction as the mysteries are rarely solved and episodes sometimes end on cliffhangers that are never resolved.

== Characters ==
=== Main ===
- Mike Tyson (voiced by himself) is the title character of the series. Mike Tyson is a retired boxer who now solves mysteries. He is portrayed as well-meaning, if somewhat eccentric and detached from reality. Examples include confusing a chess Grandmaster (Garry Kasparov) with the Grand Wizard of the Ku Klux Klan, or Elon Musk with Elton John, thinking a binary code spells out 'Ooo', and eating junk food without realizing he's on a diet. He has a reputation for doing unusual things like taking an oatmeal bath with cooked oatmeal, owning a pet grizzly bear, and using mosquitoes to help him sleep, along with pronouncing the names of many other characters incorrectly, even by calling his own daughter Yang or Yee instead of Yung.
  - Tyson also appears in live-action form during the end credits.
- Pigeon (voiced by Norm Macdonald) is an alcoholic, sexually depraved, sarcastic pigeon. He is a former human who was turned into a pigeon by his ex-wife as a curse for cheating on her. His real name is revealed to be Richard, although everyone still calls him Pigeon – his full name is later revealed to be "Richard Pigeon". Pigeon is disliked by Marquess and Yung Hee, but Tyson is seemingly oblivious to his obnoxious nature. Pigeon is Yung Hee's biological father from a one-night stand, although Pigeon keeps this information to himself on learning it after observing how close Mike and Yung Hee are.
- Yung Hee Tyson (voiced by Rachel Ramras) is Mike's adopted daughter. Born in 1998, she was left by her birth mother on Mike's doorstep when she was a baby. A running gag in the series is Yung Hee being repeatedly mistaken for a boy.
- Marquess of Queensberry (voiced by Jim Rash) is the deceased real-life father of modern boxing, John Douglas, the Marquess of Queensberry, is an alcoholic and flamboyant ghost who provides Mike with intellectual advice. The Marquess portion of his name is pronounced "Marcus" and rendered as if it is his actual name, instead of a title.
- Deezy (voiced by Chuck Deezy; main season 4, recurring seasons 1–3) is Mike Tyson's agent, whom he infrequently attempts to fire but finds himself unable to due to a fear of direct confrontation.

=== Recurring ===
- Bert (voiced by Hugh Davidson) is a foul-mouthed New York City limousine driver.
- Carol (voiced by Jill Matson-Sachoff) is Mike's short-term wife.
- Jillian Davis (voiced by Cheryl Hines) is a Newport Beach socialite.
- Terry (voiced by Rhys Darby) is the good-natured New Zealander who tends Mike's swimming pool.
- Maxine (voiced by Rachael Harris) is the owner of the Don't Judge a Book antique store, and a confidant of Marquess's.
- Delvin (voiced by David Hoffman or Larry Dorf) is the mild-mannered manager of Munn's supermarket.
- Harold Feder (voiced by Kevin Ruf) is Mike's attorney and Yung Hee's godfather.

== Episodes ==
Season	Episodes	Originally released	
Season	Episodes	First released	Last released
1	10	October 27, 2014	February 8, 2015
2	20	November 1, 2015	June 12, 2016
3	20	May 14, 2017	May 13, 2018
4	20	June 30, 2019	February 16, 2020

== Home media ==
The first season was released on DVD on October 20, 2015, by Warner Bros. Home Entertainment. The second season was released on DVD on September 27, 2016, exclusively through Warner's online store and Amazon.com.

== Reception ==
The series has received generally positive reviews from critics. The show's first season currently holds an 82% approval rating on Rotten Tomatoes based on 11 reviews, with an average rating of 6.2/10, with the site's consensus reading: "A dizzying whirl of lowbrow and high-concept, Mike Tyson Mysteries should more than satisfy fans of Adult Swim's signature blend of animated silliness." On Metacritic, the season has a weighted average score of 75 out of 100 based on 6 reviews, indicating "generally favorable" reviews.

== Cancellation and other media ==
In a May 2020 podcast interview, writer Larry Dorf confirmed that the fourth season would be its last, although Davidson, Ramras, and Dorf would continue working together on a new project for Warner Bros.

Characters from Mike Tyson Mysteries appear in the Robot Chicken special, titled Robot Chicken Adult Swim Special. In the special, Mike Tyson (voiced by himself) appears as a judge overseeing the trial between Harvey Birdman and Lawyer Morty (a parody of Morty Smith from Rick and Morty), before it is revealed he is Adult Swim's AI butler. Additionally, the main characters from Mike Tyson Mysteries appear too, with Tyson and Ramras reprising their respective roles as Mike Tyson and Yung Hee, while Dana Snyder replaced Jim Rash as Marquess of Queensberry and Richard the Pigeon is silent (due to his voice actor Norm Macdonald passing away in September 14th, 2021).

== International release ==
In Canada, Mike Tyson Mysteries was exclusively available on Netflix until June 30, 2022.

== See also ==
- Jackie Chan Adventures, similar fictionalized animated series about actor and professional martial artist Jackie Chan.
- Major Lazer, similar fictionalized animated adventure series about musical group Major Lazer.
