= List of Reno 911! episodes =

Episodes of American comedy television series

This is a list of episodes for the television series Reno 911!. It premiered on July 23, 2003, and ended on July 8, 2009, with a total of 88 episodes. A film titled Reno 911!: Miami debuted in theaters while airing the fourth season. The show itself returned on May 4, 2020, after a nearly 11-year hiatus. Resurrected by a new short-form mobile television streaming service, called Quibi, Reno 911!'s 7th season consisted of 8 episodes, running approximately 17 minutes each. In 2021, a second film titled Reno 911!: The Hunt for QAnon was released on Paramount+.

== Series overview ==
Season	Episodes	Originally released		
Season	Episodes	First released	Last released	Network
1	14	July 23, 2003	October 20, 2003	Comedy Central
2	16	June 9, 2004	September 22, 2004	Comedy Central
3	13	June 14, 2005	September 6, 2005	Comedy Central
4	14	July 9, 2006	May 13, 2007	Comedy Central
Miami		February 23, 2007		Theatrical release
5	16	January 16, 2008	July 10, 2008	Comedy Central
6	15	April 1, 2009	July 8, 2009	Comedy Central
7	25	May 4, 2020	September 7, 2020	Quibi
The Hunt for QAnon		December 23, 2021		Paramount+
8	11	February 25, 2022		The Roku Channel
It's a Wonderful Heist		December 3, 2022		Comedy Central

== Episodes ==
=== Season 1 (2003) ===
No. overall	No. in season	Title	Directed by	Written by	Original release date	Prod. code	U.S. viewers (millions)
1	1	"Pilot"	Michael Patrick Jann	Robert Ben Garant, Kerri Kenney-Silver & Thomas Lennon	July 23, 2003	101	N/A
Due to a shortage of criminals, Lt. Dangle declares a zero-tolerance policy, but he becomes the first one affected when he rear-ends a car.
2	2	"Fireworks"	Michael Patrick Jann	Robert Ben Garant, Kerri Kenney-Silver & Thomas Lennon	July 30, 2003	104	N/A
Jones and Garcia talk to a man about illegal fireworks and Wiegel goes undercover as a prostitute.
3	3	"Execution Tickets"	Michael Patrick Jann	Robert Ben Garant, Kerri Kenney-Silver & Thomas Lennon	August 6, 2003	105	N/A
Dangle and Junior try to win tickets to an Amy Grant concert in a radio sweepstakes. Dangle has two passes to a public execution, and assigns a scavenger hunt.
4	4	"Clementine's Pregnant"	Michael Patrick Jann	Robert Ben Garant, Kerri Kenney-Silver & Thomas Lennon	August 13, 2003	107	N/A
Clementine is pregnant and Garcia proposes to her. Clementine also shows a sex offender (Michael Ian Black) around his new neighborhood.
5	5	"Jones Gets Suspended"	Michael Patrick Jann	Robert Ben Garant, Kerri Kenney-Silver & Thomas Lennon	August 20, 2003	106	N/A
After getting suspended for punching Garcia in the face for making a racist joke, Jones is forced to take up crossing guard duty which he enjoys.
6	6	"Help From the FBI"	Michael Patrick Jann	Robert Ben Garant, Kerri Kenney-Silver & Thomas Lennon	August 27, 2003	108	N/A
The FBI comes to Reno to investigate a murder, with the deputies getting in the way.
7	7	"Wiegel Suicide Watch"	Michael Patrick Jann	Robert Ben Garant, Kerri Kenney-Silver & Thomas Lennon	September 3, 2003	109	N/A
Wiegel attempts suicide, and the department is unwillingly on suicide watch. Meanwhile, Johnson and Garcia are assigned to a mission together, learning that they have more in common than they thought.
8	8	"Clementine Gets Married"	Michael Patrick Jann	Robert Ben Garant, Kerri Kenney-Silver & Thomas Lennon	September 10, 2003	103	N/A
Clementine's scummy boyfriend Steed proposes to her. The department fears for the worst.
9	9	"Garcia's Anniversary"	Michael Patrick Jann	Robert Ben Garant, Kerri Kenney-Silver & Thomas Lennon	September 17, 2003	110	N/A
Dangle, Jones, and Junior take a bitter Garcia to a strip club for his 15th anniversary on the Reno SD.
10	10	"Burning Man Festival"	Michael Patrick Jann	Robert Ben Garant, Kerri Kenney-Silver & Thomas Lennon	September 24, 2003	102	N/A
The officers go undercover at the Burning Man Festival.
11	11	"Dangle's Moving Day"	Michael Patrick Jann	Robert Ben Garant, Kerri Kenney-Silver & Thomas Lennon	October 1, 2003	112	N/A
Dangle is moving out of his house and asks for the department's help. Jones is the only one who shows.
12	12	"Terrorist Training" (Part 1)	Michael Patrick Jann	Robert Ben Garant, Kerri Kenney-Silver & Thomas Lennon	October 8, 2003	111	N/A
Two agents (Oscar Nunez and Cathy Shim) from the Department of Homeland Security come to Reno to teach the officers how to deal with a terrorist attack.
13	13	"Terrorist Training" (Part 2)	Michael Patrick Jann	Robert Ben Garant, Kerri Kenney-Silver & Thomas Lennon	October 15, 2003	114	N/A
The officers continue their training with the agents from Homeland Security. The deputies take the test and somehow pass with flying colors, with disastrous results.
14	14	"Halloween" (Part 1)	Michael Patrick Jann	Robert Ben Garant, Kerri Kenney-Silver & Thomas Lennon	October 20, 2003	113	N/A
Wiegel tries to catch the kids who prank her house every year. First appearance of Sheriff Walter Chechekevitch.

=== Season 2 (2004) ===
No. overall	No. in season	Title	Directed by	Written by	Original release date	Prod. code	US viewers (millions)
15	1	"Dangle's Promotion" (Part 2)	Michael Patrick Jann	Unknown	June 9, 2004	201	N/A
Dangle gets promoted and takes everyone to dinner, but Jones has tickets to a sold-out basketball game on the same night.
16	2	"Wiegel's New Boyfriend"	Michael Patrick Jann	Unknown	June 16, 2004	202	N/A
The Reno SD believe Wiegel's new boyfriend (Kyle Dunnigan) is the Truckee River Killer. Johnson and Dangle double date with the happy couple.
17	3	"British Law"	Michael Patrick Jann	Unknown	June 23, 2004	203	N/A
A British constable visits the Reno SD and spends the day with Garcia.
18	4	"Dangle's Wife Visits"	Michael Patrick Jann	Unknown	June 30, 2004	204	N/A
Dangle's ex-wife (Rachael Harris) visits just as the deputies are trying to get rid of the Ten Commandments monument on their front lawn.
19	5	"Religion in Reno"	Michael Patrick Jann	Unknown	July 7, 2004	205	N/A
Reverend Gigg LeCarp (Brian Phelps), a petty criminal-turned-televangelist, broadcasts his show from the Reno jail.
20	6	"Fire Fighters Are Jerks"	Michael Patrick Jann	Unknown	July 14, 2004	206	N/A
The annual Policeman's Ball is on the same night as the Reno Fire Department's Pancake Dinner.
21	7	"Not Without My Mustache"	Michael Patrick Jann	Unknown	July 21, 2004	207	N/A
Dangle, Garcia, and Junior try to protect their mustaches from a county ordered shave.
22	8	"Security for Kenny Rogers"	Michael Patrick Jann	Unknown	July 28, 2004	208	N/A
Garcia and Wiegel act as bodyguards for Kenny Rogers at his book signing.
23	9	"More FBI Help"	Michael Patrick Jann	Unknown	August 4, 2004	209	N/A
The Lieutenant-Governor's brother goes missing, so an FBI criminal profiler (Ian Roberts) is called in.
24	10	"Raineesha X"	Michael Patrick Jann	Unknown	August 11, 2004	210	N/A
Williams discovers the Nation of Islam and converts, to Jones' excitement.
25	11	"Clementine and Garcia Are Dating"	Michael Patrick Jann	Unknown	August 18, 2004	211	N/A
Deputies Johnson and Garcia begin dating, to everyone's disgust .
26	12	"Jones and Garcia's Drug Stake-Out"	Michael Patrick Jann	Unknown	August 25, 2004	212	N/A
Jones and Garcia go undercover on a drug stakeout, but get distracted by attractive women.
27	13	"President Bush's Motorcade"	Michael Patrick Jann	Unknown	September 1, 2004	213	N/A
The Reno SD is assigned traffic control when President Bush makes a visit to Reno.
28	14	"Junior Gets Married" (Part 1)	Michael Patrick Jann	Unknown	September 8, 2004	214	N/A
Junior accidentally gets married; Jones and Garcia accidentally kill the Milkshake Man.
29	15	"Milkshake Man's Death" (Part 2)	Michael Patrick Jann	Unknown	September 15, 2004	215	N/A
The investigation begins into the death of the Milkshake Man. Second appearance of Sheriff Walter Chechekevitch.
30	16	"Investigation Concluded" (Part 3)	Michael Patrick Jann	Unknown	September 22, 2004	216	N/A
The investigation into the Milkshake Man's death concludes with the entire Reno Sheriff's Department, sans Chechekevitch, being fired and imprisoned.

=== Season 3 (2005) ===
No. overall	No. in season	Title	Directed by	Written by	Original release date	Prod. code	US viewers (millions)
31	1	"Released From Prison"	Michael Patrick Jann	Unknown	June 14, 2005	301	N/A
A look into how the former Reno SD officers deal with life in prison.
32	2	"Revenge of Mike Powers"	Michael Patrick Jann	Unknown	June 21, 2005	302	N/A
Now that the former Reno deputies have been released from prison, they are now enjoying their new lives as civilians. Future cast member Joe Lo Truglio is seen briefly as an assault victim.
33	3	"Cop School"	Michael Patrick Jann	Unknown	June 28, 2005	303	N/A
The former Reno deputies are now finally back on the beat and they're looking to add a new member to their team. First appearance of Deputy Cherisha Kimball.
34	4	"SARS Outbreak"	Michael Patrick Jann	Unknown	July 5, 2005	304	N/A
Wiegel, Jones, and Dangle are all quarantined because they might have SARS. Meanwhile, the other deputies hang out with Reading Ron (Brian Unger), the host of a popular Reno children's TV show.
35	5	"Fastest Criminal in Reno"	Michael Patrick Jann	Unknown	July 12, 2005	305	N/A
The department gets a chance to try to catch Eddie "Fast Eddie" McLintock (Jeff Foxworthy), the fastest criminal in the southwest.
36	6	"The Prefect of Wanganui"	Michael Patrick Jann	Unknown	July 19, 2005	306	N/A
The leader of Reno's sister city of Wanganui arrives, but Dangle and Kimball accidentally pick up the wrong man.
37	7	"...And the Installation Is Free"	Thomas Lennon	Unknown	July 26, 2005	307	N/A
Jones gets a new job as a voice-over artist for a local carpeting company and considers quitting the Reno Sheriff's Department.
38	8	"Clemmy Marries a Dead Guy"	Thomas Lennon	Unknown	August 2, 2005	308	N/A
Johnson becomes engaged to the wealthy owner of a hot tub store chain, but will they make it to the altar?
39	9	"Garcia's Secret Girlfriend"	Robert Ben Garant	Unknown	August 9, 2005	309	N/A
Why is Garcia hiding his new girlfriend from the other deputies?
40	10	"Dangle's Son"	Robert Ben Garant	Unknown	August 16, 2005	310	N/A
Dangle discovers he might have a son that he never knew about.
41	11	"CSI: Reno"	Robert Ben Garant	Unknown	August 23, 2005	311	N/A
CSI comes to shoot in Reno with the deputies serving as Security.
42	12	"Naked Stake-Out"	Michael Patrick Jann	Unknown	August 30, 2005	312	N/A
Dangle and Junior try to make a drug bust, but it goes wrong and they have to make it all the way back to the station on foot for miles, completely naked.
43	13	"Wiegel and Craig Get Married" (Part 1)	Brad Abrams	Unknown	September 6, 2005	313	N/A
Wiegel's boyfriend Craig Pullin (aka The Truckee River Killer) proposes to her; Dangle and Garcia are trapped in a police cruiser in a snowstorm en route to the wedding.

=== Season 4 (2006–07) ===
No. overall	No. in season	Title	Directed by	Written by	Original release date	Prod. code
44	1	"Wiegel's Pregnant (Part 2)"	Unknown	Unknown	July 9, 2006	401
Garcia and Dangle are rescued; Craig is executed. Six months later, Wiegel arrives back from her pregnant leave. Carrot Top goes crazy in a Reno hotel.
45	2	"The Junior Bros."	Unknown	Unknown	July 16, 2006	402
Garcia goes undercover to bust illegal immigrants.
46	3	"Jet Ski Blues"	Unknown	Unknown	July 23, 2006	403
When a lonely deputy dies, the Reno SD inherits his jet-ski.
47	4	"Rick's On It"	Unknown	Unknown	July 30, 2006	404
A citizen's patrolman (Paul Reubens) helps the Reno SD when a crime wave strikes Reno.
48	5	"Spanish Mike Comes Back"	Unknown	Unknown	August 6, 2006	405
Spanish Mike returns to wreak havoc at the Reno SD.
49	6	"Son of a Chechekevitch (Part 1)"	Unknown	Unknown	August 13, 2006	406
After Chechekevitch is killed on duty, the deputies swear they will avenge his death.
50	7	"The Investigation Continues (Part 2)"	Unknown	Unknown	August 27, 2006	407
The Reno SD continues to investigate Chechekevitch's death.
51	8	"Corporate Sponsor"	Unknown	Unknown	April 1, 2007	408
Hotties Hot Wings sponsors the department and, despite the free perks, everyone gets fed up.
52	9	"Christian Karaoke Singles' Mixer"	Unknown	Unknown	April 8, 2007	409
Clemmie accompanies Kimball to her singles mixer and accidentally gets baptized.
53	10	"Proposition C"	Unknown	Unknown	April 15, 2007	410
The deputies campaign for ballot Proposition C on the mistaken belief that it will increase their salaries; actually, it's just the opposite.
54	11	"Reno Mounties"	Unknown	Unknown	April 22, 2007	411
Jones and Garcia transfer to the mounted police. Junior and Kimball learn that they are cousins.
55	12	"Hodgepodge"	Unknown	Unknown	April 29, 2007	412
Kimball tries arresting a magician performing without a permit, who can get out of whatever restraint she places on him. Dangle accidentally sets free a child killer. A customer posing as a Better Business Bureau agent wants to file a complaint against a legal brothel for fraud. Junior and Jones deal with a drunk at a Renaissance Festival.
56	13	"Happy Anniversary"	Unknown	Unknown	May 6, 2007	413
Dangle visits his ex-wife and her husband on their first anniversary.
57	14	"Dangle's Wedding (Part 1)"	Unknown	Unknown	May 13, 2007	414
Dangle's ex-wife's husband proposes to him. A naked Wiegel gets stuck in a giant cake and goes into labor. Dangle holds his wedding at the hospital when Garcia bursts in and declares his love for Dangle's fiancee. Wiegel tells Dangle that she knows who her child's father is.

=== Season 5 (2008) ===
No. overall	No. in season	Title	Original release date	Prod. code
58	1	"Jumping the Shark (Part 2)"	January 16, 2008	501
Wiegel offers to sell her baby to the highest bidder, but her racist tendencies keep her from making a deal with prospective parents of color.
59	2	"Tommy Hawk"	January 23, 2008	502
Bounty hunter Tommy Hawk (Diedrich Bader) comes to Reno to film an episode of his reality show and offends the deputies.
60	3	"Kevlar for Her"	January 30, 2008	503
The new bulletproof vests designed for the female officers have an unexpected side effect. Meanwhile, a freed prisoner plans revenge on the department, but they don't remember who he is.
61	4	"Mayor Hernandez"	February 6, 2008	504
When Mayor Hernandez (George Lopez) shows up at the station seeking help, the deputies must decide whether to uphold the law, or uphold local government.
62	5	"Coconut Nut Clusters"	February 13, 2008	505
The deputies raise money by going door-to-door selling chocolate bars; most succeed but Jones and Kimball don't do well.
63	6	"Back in Black"	February 20, 2008	506
Dangle (and an unwilling Williams) take time to connect with his black half-brother and half-sister (Aisha Tyler) from his father's other family in Chicago.
64	7	"Undercover at Burger Cousin"	February 27, 2008	507
To end a string of robberies, Jones and Garcia go undercover as fast-food employees; Seth Green guest-stars as their manager.
65	8	"The Wall"	March 5, 2008	508
Junior and Garcia volunteer to build a section of the wall at the Mexican border, but end up on the wrong side.
66	9	"Death of a Pickle-Thrower"	May 22, 2008	509
The department pays their last respects to Jackie the prostitute, who is dying in the hospital.
67	10	"Baghdad 911"	May 29, 2008	510
The officers must train a group of Iraqi police, but a translator who never says the right things and the new recruits' sense of mischief and overactive libido hamper their training.
68	11	"The Tanning Booth Incident"	June 5, 2008	511
While Dangle recuperates in the hospital from an overly long tanning session, his fellow officers visit him and make ample use of his incapacitation to share their true feelings and thoughts.
69	12	"Strong Sister"	June 12, 2008	512
A reporter from 'Strong Sister magazine' visits the station to do an in-depth profile on Deputy Raineesha Williams.
70	13	"Wiegel's Dad Returns"	June 19, 2008	513
A Native American man claiming to be Deputy Trudy Wiegel's father spends the day with her, which raises suspicion from the others in the department. Dangle and Junior work a prostitution sting.
71	14	"Junior Runs for Office"	June 26, 2008	514
Junior runs for office, as the Commissioner for Animal Carcass Removal. Dangle and Wiegel deal with yet another Bungee Jump wedding.
72	15	"Undercover Acting Coach"	July 3, 2008	515
The department brings in a Hollywood acting coach (Ryan Stiles) to teach them how to act like criminals and meth-heads.
73	16	"The Parade" (Part 1)	July 10, 2008	516
The deputies try to win an award at the Carson City Parade.

=== Season 6 (2009) ===
Season six debuted on April 1, 2009. Garcia, Johnson, and Kimball did not return for the sixth season. According to Lt. Dangle, these deputies were lost in the explosion during the previous season cliffhanger.

No. overall	No. in season	Title	Original release date	Prod. code
74	1	"Training Day" (Part 2)	April 1, 2009	601
Two new officers (Ian Roberts, Joe Lo Truglio) join the force, and Williams and Dangle confront a terminated employee (Jonah Hill) who refuses to leave his company. Terry gives one of the new guys the lowdown on the street.
75	2	"Extradition to Thailand!"	April 8, 2009	602
The deputies get a free extradition vacation to Thailand when a suspected criminal (Patton Oswalt) turns himself in.
76	3	"Digging with the Murderer"	April 15, 2009	603
Dangle and Williams try to get a convicted serial killer (Rainn Wilson) to reveal the location of his last victim's body.
77	4	"Dangle's Murder Mystery (Part 1)"	April 22, 2009	604
Dangle decides to host a murder mystery dinner.
78	5	"Dangle's Murder Mystery (Part 2)"	April 29, 2009	605
The deputies investigate a real murder at Dangle's murder mystery dinner party.
79	6	"We Don't Want the Pope"	May 6, 2009	606
The deputies serve as tour guides for a fact-finding mission from the Vatican, though after they're through it is doubtful that the Pope will ever visit Reno.
80	7	"VHS Transfer Memory Lane"	May 13, 2009	607
The deputies wax nostalgic about old cases when they transfer evidence tapes to DVD.
81	8	"Helping Mayor Hernandez"	May 20, 2009	608
The deputies scramble to help Mayor Hernandez when he needs to get rid of a prostitute who happens to be in his hotel room.
82	9	"Getaway Trailer"	May 27, 2009	609
After being trapped in a crook's getaway vehicle, Wiegel and Rizzo take advantage of this prime opportunity to get better acquainted.
83	10	"Stoner Jesus"	June 3, 2009	610
The deputies have their hands full when a Jesus Christ Superstar touring company comes to town; Jim finally gets around to presenting his tribute to Princess Diana.
84	11	"Deputy Dance"	June 10, 2009	611
Looking to boost their recruitment numbers, the department taps well-known Reno director Levon French (Craig Robinson) to film a commercial.
85	12	"Viacom Grinch"	June 17, 2009	612
Children's parties in Reno have unwanted guests when the deputies are assigned to go after the sale of illegal toys. The sketch-comedy group Human Giant guest star.
86	13	"The Midnight Swingers"	June 24, 2009	613
Jones and Williams go undercover at a swingers' club.
87	14	"Secret Santa"	July 1, 2009	614
Rumors of extraterrestrial activity coincide with the appearance of unknown officers at the station, creating a dilemma for the deputies, who wonder if they should be part of a Secret Santa gift exchange.
88	15	"Wiegel's Couple's Therapy"	July 8, 2009	615
Williams draws the short straw when a health-insurance stipulation leaves Wiegel searching for a partner for couples therapy.

=== Season 7 (2020) ===
No. overall	No. in season	Title	Directed by	Written by	Original release date	Prod. code
Part 1
89	1	"Meet Jeffy"	David Lincoln	Robert Ben Garant, Kerri Kenney-Silver & Thomas Lennon	May 4, 2020	TBA
90	2	"Concealed Carry Fashion Show"	Robert Ben Garant	Robert Ben Garant, Kerri Kenney-Silver & Thomas Lennon	May 4, 2020	TBA
91	3	"TT's Auntie's Funeral"	David Lincoln	Robert Ben Garant, Kerri Kenney-Silver & Thomas Lennon	May 4, 2020	TBA
92	4	"Let's Shoot a White Guy, Part 1"	Robert Ben Garant	Robert Ben Garant, Kerri Kenney-Silver & Thomas Lennon	May 5, 2020	TBA
93	5	"Let's Shoot a White Guy, Part 2"	Thomas Lennon	Robert Ben Garant, Kerri Kenney-Silver & Thomas Lennon	May 6, 2020	TBA
94	6	"Big Mike's Rocket Rascal"	Thomas Lennon	Robert Ben Garant, Kerri Kenney-Silver & Thomas Lennon	May 7, 2020	TBA
95	7	"Space Force"	Christian Hoffman	Robert Ben Garant, Kerri Kenney-Silver & Thomas Lennon	May 8, 2020	TBA
96	8	"Weekend at Bernie"	David Lincoln	Robert Ben Garant, Kerri Kenney-Silver & Thomas Lennon	May 11, 2020	TBA
97	9	"Truckee River Revenge"	Christian Hoffman	Robert Ben Garant, Kerri Kenney-Silver & Thomas Lennon	May 12, 2020	TBA
98	10	"The Return of Diablo"	James Alan Hensz	Robert Ben Garant, Kerri Kenney-Silver & Thomas Lennon	May 13, 2020	TBA
99	11	"Lil' Primo"	David Lincoln	Robert Ben Garant, Kerri Kenney-Silver & Thomas Lennon	May 14, 2020	TBA
100	12	"Jackie's Birthday"	James Alan Hensz	Robert Ben Garant, Kerri Kenney-Silver & Thomas Lennon	May 15, 2020	TBA
Part 2
101	13	"Dangle Goes Live"	Robert Ben Garant	Robert Ben Garant, Kerri Kenney-Silver & Thomas Lennon	August 24, 2020	TBA
102	14	"Escape-O-Rama Room"	Robert Ben Garant	Robert Ben Garant, Kerri Kenney-Silver & Thomas Lennon	August 24, 2020	TBA
103	15	"High Plains Stoner"	Thomas Lennon	Robert Ben Garant, Kerri Kenney-Silver & Thomas Lennon	August 24, 2020	TBA
104	16	"Coyote Hazing"	Christian Hoffman	Robert Ben Garant, Kerri Kenney-Silver & Thomas Lennon	August 25, 2020	TBA
105	17	"Nuge 2020"	Christian Hoffman & David Lincoln	Robert Ben Garant, Kerri Kenney-Silver & Thomas Lennon	August 26, 2020	TBA
106	18	"Garcia Self Deports"	Thomas Lennon	Robert Ben Garant, Kerri Kenney-Silver & Thomas Lennon	August 27, 2020	TBA
107	19	"Gigg"	James Alan Hensz	Robert Ben Garant, Kerri Kenney-Silver & Thomas Lennon	August 28, 2020	TBA
108	20	"Gay Cakes"	Robert Ben Garant	Robert Ben Garant, Kerri Kenney-Silver & Thomas Lennon	August 31, 2020	TBA
109	21	"Cellphone Awareness Training"	Thomas Lennon	Robert Ben Garant, Kerri Kenney-Silver & Thomas Lennon	September 1, 2020	TBA
110	22	"Indigenous People's Day"	Thomas Lennon	Robert Ben Garant, Kerri Kenney-Silver & Thomas Lennon	September 2, 2020	TBA
111	23	"Cats-ident"	Robert Ben Garant	Robert Ben Garant, Kerri Kenney-Silver & Thomas Lennon	September 3, 2020	TBA
112	24	"Goodbye, Farewell and Amen II"	James Alan Hensz	Robert Ben Garant, Kerri Kenney-Silver & Thomas Lennon	September 4, 2020	TBA
113	25	"Sofia the Drug Lord"	Christian Hoffman	Robert Ben Garant, Kerri Kenney-Silver & Thomas Lennon	September 7, 2020	TBA

=== Season 8 (2022): Reno 911! Defunded ===
On September 3, 2020, Quibi announced that they had renewed the series for an additional season prior to announcing on October 21, 2020, that the service would be shutdown shortly after. On October 23, 2020, it was announced that filming for new season, which commenced prior to Quibi's closure announcement, would continue as planned. The timing of filming meant Niecy Nash had a significantly reduced role in the season as another show she starred in, Claws, was filming the remainder of its fourth and final season between September 21, 2020, and November 30, 2020.

On August 18, 2021, it was announced that a new season of the show would air on The Roku Channel following their previous acquisition of Quibi's shows. On February 9, 2022, it was announced that the episodes would be released on February 25, 2022, under the title Reno 911! Defunded.

No. overall	No. in season	Title	Directed by	Written by	Original release date	Prod. code
114	1	"Defunded"	David Lincoln	Robert Ben Garant, Kerri Kenney-Silver & Thomas Lennon	February 25, 2022	TBA
The officers accidentally raid the wrong apartment when performing a wellness check. Dangle and Travis are hunted down by Ted Nugent at his compound. Williams advertises politically incorrect clothing. A self-declared "king of gnomes" is investigated. Dangle and Jones advertise a combined pepper spray and deodorant. Deputies attempt to arrest a nudist. Throughout the episode, the officers deal with the ramifications of being defunded.
115	2	"Bad Lieutenant Woman"	Christian Hoffman	Robert Ben Garant, Kerri Kenney-Silver & Thomas Lennon	February 25, 2022	TBA
Travis and Jones play a prank on Lt. Dangle. The female officers of the Reno Sheriff's Department are harassed by an officer (Jamie Lee Curtis) of the neighboring Sparks Sheriff's department under the guise of an evaluation. Meanwhile the male officers ride in a crowded car with criminals they've arrested. Dep. Williams stars in a PSA encouraging looters to avoid Reno and loot Tahoe instead, and Travis trains a K-9 officer.
116	3	"Dangle's Retirement Plan"	Robert Ben Garant	Robert Ben Garant, Kerri Kenney-Silver & Thomas Lennon	February 25, 2022	TBA
Cindy has an idea for her and Lt. Dangle to enter a seniors' dance competition at a local senior center as a retirement plan. Weigel and Jones compete for customers at a bake sale with local teachers. Dep. Travis is training his K-9, who runs away, and tries to lure him back with marijuana. Jones and Rizzo go undercover in a covert sting with a black market human organ harvester (Michael Ian Black). Later, the deputies respond to a hotel for a disorderly party of females and Williams stars in a PSA about distracted driving.
117	4	"Law Enforcement Mini Fun Fest"	David Lincoln	Robert Ben Garant, Kerri Kenney-Silver & Thomas Lennon	February 25, 2022	TBA
The deputies host the Reno Law Enforement Mini-Fun Fair benefitting the fight against Lupus. They participate in field competitions against Hatzolah, led by Captain Schwartz (Michael Ian Black). Former Reno Mayor Wanye Hernandez (George Lopez) advertises a re-election campaign. A clown in the woods (Ken Marino) is investigated by Lt. Dangle and Sgt. Declan.
118	5	"Clemmy's Prestige"	Christian Hoffman	Robert Ben Garant, Kerri Kenney-Silver & Thomas Lennon	February 25, 2022	TBA
Jackie is confronted by deputies on a walking bridge but jumps over it in chase of her crack pipe. Dep. Williams stars in a PSA about reporting police misconduct in the age of defunded police. Dep. Johnson's twin sister returns. Lt. Dangle and Travis take ecstasy and go to the desert.
119	6	"Haunted Hayride"	Robert Ben Garant	Robert Ben Garant, Kerri Kenney-Silver & Thomas Lennon	February 25, 2022	TBA
120	7	"Jonesteenth"	Robert Ben Garant	Robert Ben Garant, Kerri Kenney-Silver & Thomas Lennon	February 25, 2022	TBA
121	8	"Beige Lives Matter?"	David Lincoln	Robert Ben Garant, Kerri Kenney-Silver & Thomas Lennon	February 25, 2022	TBA
122	9	"Woody's Adventure"	Christian Hoffman	Robert Ben Garant, Kerri Kenney-Silver & Thomas Lennon	February 25, 2022	TBA
123	10	"Dangle's Mike Pence Challenge Coin"	David Lincoln	Robert Ben Garant, Kerri Kenney-Silver & Thomas Lennon	February 25, 2022	TBA
124	11	"The Hills Have Owls"	Christian Hoffman	Robert Ben Garant, Kerri Kenney-Silver & Thomas Lennon	February 25, 2022	TBA
