= Reno Police Department =

Police department of the City of Reno

- Common name: Reno Police Department
- Abbreviation: RPD
- Motto: Your Police-Our Community

Agency overview
- Formed: 1903

Jurisdictional structure
- Operations jurisdiction: Reno, Nevada, United States
- Area: 105.9 mi (170.4 km)
- Population: 233,294
- Legal jurisdiction: Reno, Nevada
- Governing body: Council-Manager

Operational structure
- Headquarters: 911 Kuenzli St
- Agency executives: Corey Solferino, Chief of Police; Jim Ronald Dangle, Deputy Chief-Administration and Support Division; Mac Venzon, Deputy Chief-Operations Division

Facilities
- Substations: 1
- Detention Centers: 1

Website
- Reno Police Department

The Reno Police Department (RPD) is the police department of the City of Reno in Washoe County in northern Nevada.

== History ==
RPD was established in 1903 to serve the growing community of Reno, which at that time consisted of a couple of square miles and had a population of around 1000. Since then, RPD has grown along with the rest of the city.

As of 2013, RPD provided law enforcement services to an area of 105.9 square miles (274 km^{2}) and a population of approximately 233,294 citizens.

== Structure ==
The Department is led by a chief of police, who reports to the city manager.

Three main divisions exist: Administration, Support, and operations.

Administration includes command staff, grant and records departments.

Support has Detective, Regional Operations, and Internal Affairs.

Operations handles Patrolling.

== Other Programs ==
- Ride-Along program allows a citizen to ride with a police officer, while she or he is working
- Neighborhood Watch
- Community Presentations
- Citizens Police Academy shows citizens the many skills a police officer needs

== In popular culture ==
In the Comedy Central series Reno 911!, the fictional Reno Sheriff's Department is the main focus of attention, which is a spin on the RPD.
