= Hugh Davidson (actor) =

American actor

- Occupations: Actor; producer; writer; story editor
- Years active: 1994–present
- Spouse: Rachel Ramras (m. 2013)

Hugh Davidson is an American actor, writer, and producer, best known for his work on the Adult Swim television series Robot Chicken.

== Career ==
Davidson made his motion picture debut in the 2001 film Pledge of Innocence. He later guest starred on television shows such as Reno 911!, Arrested Development and Will and Grace and as himself in the Mike Tyson Mysteries episode "Unsolved Situations", which he also produces.

In 2006, Davidson went to work as a voice actor and writer for Robot Chicken, for which he won a Primetime Emmy Award in 2010. He also worked as a voice actor and writer for the Adult Swim show Saul of the Mole Men. He wrote three episodes of the series, and starred as the voice of Bertrum Burrows. In 2008, Davidson starred as Thomas Jefferson in the Adult Swim special Young Person's Guide to History. He also voiced characters on the TV show Mad as a series regular and one of the principal cast members.

Davidson is an alumnus of The Groundlings, an improvisational and sketch comedy troupe based in Los Angeles, California.

Davidson was a writer and story editor for The Looney Tunes Show and a producer for Mike Tyson Mysteries. Davidson produced the short-lived TV Land series, Nobodies. Davidson, along with Larry Dorf and Rachel Ramras, executive produced, wrote and starred in the series. Melissa McCarthy and Ben Falcone also starred in the project. Mike McDonald is the showrunner. More recently, he signed an overall deal with Warner Bros. Animation. In 2022 he co-created the Netflix dark comedy parody series The Woman in the House Across the Street from the Girl in the Window.

== Filmography ==
Year	Title	Actor	Writer	Producer	Role(s)	Notes
2001	Pledge of Innocence	Yes			Stretch	Theatrical film
2004	Reno 911!	Yes			Monkey Man	Episode "President Bush's Motorcade"
2004	Crossing Jordan	Yes			FBI Suit #1	Episode "Out of Sight"
2005	Arrested Development	Yes			Police Officer #1	Episode "Meat the Veals"
2005	Hollywood Vice	Yes			Lee Vanderhook	Television film
2005	Bewitched	Yes			Network Executive	Theatrical film
2006	Will & Grace	Yes			Dan	Episode "Partners 'n' Crime"
2006–2018	Robot Chicken	Yes	Yes		Various voices	Actor in 17 episodes Writer in 25 episodes
2007	Saul of the Mole Men	Yes	Yes		Bertram (voice) / Various	Actor in 19 episodes Writer in 3 episodes
2007	The Minor Accomplishments of Jackie Woodman	Yes			Lars Ahlstrom	3 episodes
2008	Young Person's Guide to History	Yes	Yes	Yes	Thomas Jefferson	Creator, executive producer and actor in 2 episodes
2009	Titan Maximum	Yes			Mr. Hammerschmiddtt	2 episodes
2010–2013	Mad	Yes			Various voices	59 episodes
2011	Your Pretty Face Is Going to Hell	Yes			Unknown	Pilot
2011–2013	The Looney Tunes Show	Yes	Yes	Yes	Additional voices	Actor in 14 episodes Writer in 50 episodes Producer in 26 episodes Story editor in 10 episodes Composer in 3 episodes
2014	Benched	Yes			Gabriel	Episode "Curry Favor"
2014–2020	Mike Tyson Mysteries	Yes	Yes	Yes	Various voices	
2015	Looney Tunes: Rabbits Run		Yes	Yes		Direct-to-video film Voice director
2017–2018	Nobodies	Yes	Yes	Yes	Hugh Davidson	Creator, writer and executive producer 24 episodes
2022	The Woman in the House Across the Street from the Girl in the Window		Yes	Yes		Co-creator, writer, producer 8 episodes
