= The Woman in the House Across the Street from the Girl in the Window =

2022 American television miniseries

- Promotional poster
- Genre: Dark comedy; Mystery; Thriller
- Created by: Rachel Ramras; Hugh Davidson; Larry Dorf
- Directed by: Michael Lehmann
- Starring: Kristen Bell; Michael Ealy; Tom Riley; Mary Holland; Cameron Britton; Shelley Hennig; Samsara Yett
- Music by: Nami Melumad
- Country of origin: United States
- Original language: English
- No. of episodes: 8

Production
- Executive producers: Rachel Ramras; Hugh Davidson; Larry Dorf; Kristen Bell; Will Ferrell; Jessica Elbaum; Brittney Segal; Michael Lehmann
- Producer: Danielle Weinstock
- Cinematography: John Lindley
- Editors: Tara Timpone; Jennifer Van Goethem; Stephanie Willis
- Running time: 22–29 minutes
- Production companies: Hugh Rachel Larry; Gloria Sanchez Productions

Original release
- Network: Netflix
- Release: January 28, 2022

The Woman in the House Across the Street from the Girl in the Window (Note: Abbreviated by some publishers as TWITHATSFTGITW or simply The Woman in the House) is a 2022 American miniseries created by Rachel Ramras, Hugh Davidson, and Larry Dorf. A dark comedy, satirizing the psychological thriller genre, it stars Kristen Bell, Michael Ealy, Tom Riley, Mary Holland, Cameron Britton, Shelley Hennig, and Samsara Yett. The story revolves around a heartbroken woman, who believes she witnessed a murder, regardless of what others say.

Developed in late-2020, the series is inspired with the women-centric books and series of mystery thriller genres. Filming took place in 2021 in California. The eight-episode series was released on Netflix on January 28, 2022, and topped in the US in its opening week viewership. It received mixed reviews from critics, and was nominated in three categories at the People's Choice Awards.

== Cast and characters ==
=== Main ===
- Kristen Bell as Anna Whitaker, a painter who takes a break from her career to mourn the death of her daughter, and reads books with titles like The Woman Across the Lake and The Girl on the Cruise
- Michael Ealy as Douglas Whitaker, Anna's ex-husband who is a forensic psychiatrist and an FBI profiler specializing in serial killers
- Tom Riley as Neil Coleman, Anna's widowed neighbor
- Mary Holland as Sloane, Anna's supportive sister who is a local art gallery owner
- Cameron Britton as Buell, a friendly, simple-minded handyman who has been repairing Anna's mailbox for years
- Shelley Hennig as Lisa / Chastity, whom Anna believes has been murdered
- Samsara Yett as Emma Coleman, Neil's nine-year-old daughter

=== Recurring ===
- Brenda Koo as Carol, Anna's judgmental neighbor
- Christina Anthony as Detective Becky Lane
- Benjamin Levy Aguilar as Rex, a stripper

=== Additional cast ===
- Appy Pratt as Elizabeth, Anna's eight-year-old daughter who died in 2018
- Brendan Jennings as Massacre Mike, a cannibalistic serial killer who murdered Elizabeth
- Janina Gavankar as Meredith, Neil's wife who died a few months before he moved in across from Anna
- Nitya Vidyasagar as Hillary, Meredith's sister
- Nicole Pulliam as Claire, Douglas's coworker
- Lyndon Smith as Ms. Patrick, Emma's teacher
- Michael Hitchcock as Paul M. Riordan, a fingerprint guy at the police station

The final episode features cameo appearances by Jim Rash as a flight attendant and Glenn Close as a businesswoman on the flight.

== Episodes ==
No.	Title	Directed by	Written by	Original release date
1	"Episode 1"	Michael Lehmann	Rachel Ramras, Hugh Davidson, and Larry Dorf	January 28, 2022
Anna, a divorced woman in Canterbury Hill, hears strange voices in her house coming from the attic, making her believe in the existence of monsters. She often breaks chicken casserole dishes which she prepares, and passes out drunk on her sofa, while reading books. One morning, from her window, she sees her handsome new neighbor, Neil, taking his daughter Emma to school. Due to medications along with her wine, Anna hallucinates the existence of her dead daughter, Elizabeth, and goes to school herself in her bathrobe, intending to drop Elizabeth there. She stands up a blind date arranged for her by her judgmental neighbor, Carol, and visits Elizabeth's grave to talk about her new neighbors, where the headstone reads, "If love could have saved you, you would have lived forever". The next day, Emma sells some chocolates to Anna. Neil helps Anna after she faints during a downpour, and finds out that she has an irrational fear of rain. Afterwards, she hallucinates having sex with him. The next day, she grows close to them when she brings them a casserole and they invite her for dinner.
2	"Episode 2"	Michael Lehmann	Rachel Ramras, Hugh Davidson, and Larry Dorf	January 28, 2022
Anna is surprised and upset when she sees Neil's girlfriend, Lisa. On the telephone, Anna's therapist urges her to stop taking pills with wine, but Anna ignores this advice. She reveals that her then-husband, Douglas, took their daughter Elizabeth to an investigation in a prison, where Elizabeth was murdered and eaten by a prisoner. Anna's friend Sloane suggests that Anna should start painting again for Sloane's art gallery. Anna tries to paint but rips the painting with her palette knife. She overhears Carol talking about Anna's addictions and scares her with the knife. Anna feels upset and visits Elizabeth's grave—the headstone now reads, "In Heaven you can dance like no one's watching". She starts stalking Lisa on Instagram. She believes that Lisa has been cheating on Neil with a man named Rex, and connects with Rex on Instagram. Looking through her window, Anna witnesses Lisa being murdered in Neil's house. She tries to rush to Lisa's aid, but faints in the rain.
3	"Episode 3"	Michael Lehmann	Rachel Ramras, Hugh Davidson, and Larry Dorf	January 28, 2022
Detective Lane responds to Anna's 911 call and tells her that there is no evidence of a murder. Determined to solve the mystery herself, Anna breaks into Neil's house, where she finds one of Lisa's earrings. Neil discovers Anna and orders her to stay away. He claims that Lisa, a stewardess, has left for Seattle, and he shows her Lisa's texts. Despite Neil's awareness of Anna's drinking and hallucination problems, Emma sells chocolates to Anna. Anna joins a support group at Sloane's suggestion. She finds out at the airport that Lisa's airline does not fly to Seattle and reports her findings to Lane, who does not believe her. Lane reveals that she had been a junior detective investigating "Massacre Mike", the prisoner accused of killing and eating people. Lane regrets not killing him at the time, before Elizabeth became his victim. Anna receives a death threat, "Stop or UR next". While continuing to be suspicious about Neil, she uses Douglas's FBI credentials to request profiles of Lisa and Rex.
4	"Episode 4"	Michael Lehmann	Rachel Ramras, Hugh Davidson, and Larry Dorf	January 28, 2022
Anna examines Neil's past, learns that he was a suspect in the drowning of his wife Meredith, and visits Meredith's sister, Hillary. She also learns that Emma's teacher, Ms. Patrick, died while on a school field trip to a lighthouse, 12 days after Meredith's funeral. Anna visits the school and the lighthouse and finds out that Neil was a chaperone on the trip, which reinforces her suspicions. Upon returning, Anna sees a babysitter at Neil's house and Neil leaving with a large bag. Believing that the bag contains Lisa's body, she follows him. Neil catches her, explains that he is a ventriloquist and asks that she keep it a secret. When she returns home she gets a call from the FBI with information about Rex, who then suddenly appears at her house.
5	"Episode 5"	Michael Lehmann	Rachel Ramras, Hugh Davidson, and Larry Dorf	January 28, 2022
Rex threatens Anna and forces her to text her husband to run an errand to delay his arrival. Anna wants an explanation from Rex, who reveals that Lisa, whom he knows as Chastity, was a bartender at the club where he worked as a stripper. Chastity recruited Rex into a plan to defraud wealthy men, and Neil, a wealthy widower, was their latest target. Rex tried to back off when he learned that Neil has a daughter, but Chastity threatened to blame Rex for the plan. She abruptly cut off contact, making him suspect that Anna was involved. Neil gets a restraining order against Anna, and Douglas arrives, worried about her. Anna does not tell them about Rex, and sees a woman in Douglas's car. After Anna tells Rex that she is divorced, the two feel sympathy for each other and have sex. Meanwhile, Chastity's body has been found in pieces.
6	"Episode 6"	Michael Lehmann	Rachel Ramras, Hugh Davidson, and Larry Dorf	January 28, 2022
The next morning, the police arrest Rex for Chastity's murder. He insists on his innocence but Lane plays Anna a wiretapped recording in which Rex threatens to kill Chastity. Horrified, Anna tries to turn over a new leaf and gets rid of all of her wine and pills. She enjoys a manicure-pedicure with Sloane, who is being considered for a job at an art gallery in SoHo. Anna applies a dressing to an injured Buell's wound, then visits Elizabeth's grave on her birthday, where the stone now reads "There is no 'I' in Heaven". There, she finds a birthday card from Douglas, and meets Neil and Emma, who have just attended Chastity's funeral. Back at home, Anna starts to paint but is interrupted by Lane, who tells her that Rex has been released after the police found the murder weapon - a palette knife identical to Anna's. The police search the house and find a portrait of Anna, Emma, and Neil labeled "The Perfect Family", which Anna does not remember painting, and Anna is arrested.
7	"Episode 7"	Michael Lehmann	Rachel Ramras, Hugh Davidson, and Larry Dorf	January 28, 2022
At the jail, Lane interrogates Anna, who has no memory of killing Chastity. Anna shares her history as a starving artist who found success after painting her dog as Mona Lisa and began painting other people's dogs into masterpieces. During her pregnancy, while she was confined to bed rest for three months, Douglas hired Buell to build a custom easel for her, and she started painting flower bouquets. After Anna's fingerprints are matched with those on the palette knife, she hallucinates stabbing Lisa and dreams of Douglas's second marriage to the woman she saw earlier with Douglas. The next day, Sloane pays Anna's bail with a $500,000 loan. Neil demands of Anna that she stay away. Anna calls her therapist, who is revealed to be Douglas. In her attic, she discovers a ripped painting of Chastity and a whole living area; she realizes that Buell, who has been living there, could have murdered Chastity. From the window, Anna sees Buell, carrying a claw hammer and moving towards Neil's house.
8	"Episode 8"	Michael Lehmann	Rachel Ramras, Hugh Davidson, and Larry Dorf	January 28, 2022
Rushing after Buell to save Emma, Anna struggles with her fear in the rain. She unexpectedly finds Buell severely wounded and Neil dead. Anna now becomes target of the true mastermind, Emma, who reveals that she slit her father's throat because she disliked his ventriloquism. She stabbed Lisa for not buying chocolates from her, and framed Anna. She also killed her pregnant mother because she did not want a sibling, and her teacher, whom she disliked. After a bloody fight, Anna kills Emma in self-defense just as Douglas arrives. At the hospital, Lane and Carol apologize to Anna for not believing her. Days later, Anna allows Buell, who survived his injuries, to continue living in her attic. Sloane hosts a successful exhibition and receives a job offer in New York. Douglas and Anna reconcile in the rain after he buys her painting. One year later, Anna, who has a newborn daughter with Douglas, takes a flight to New York to visit Sloane. She finds a woman apparently dead on the flight; the steward claims there has been no one as the body vanishes, leaving Anna to delve into another mystery.

== Production ==
=== Development ===
On October 20, 2020, Netflix and Gloria Sanchez Productions announced a limited series consisting of eight episodes, created by Rachel Ramras, Hugh Davidson, and Larry Dorf and executive produced by Kristen Bell (who also stars), Will Ferrell, Jessica Elbaum, and Brittney Segal. Before working on the script, Ramras sent a monologue to Elbaum which she had prepared after being inspired with the women-centric books and series of certain genre. Different ideas in the drafts could not be executed for having a comfortable environment during the COVID-19 pandemic, and Ferrell was supervising them online through Zoom conversations.

=== Casting and filming ===
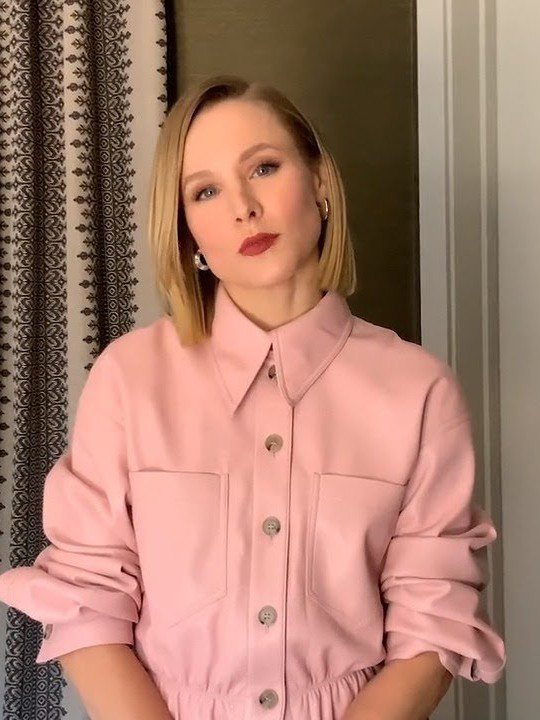
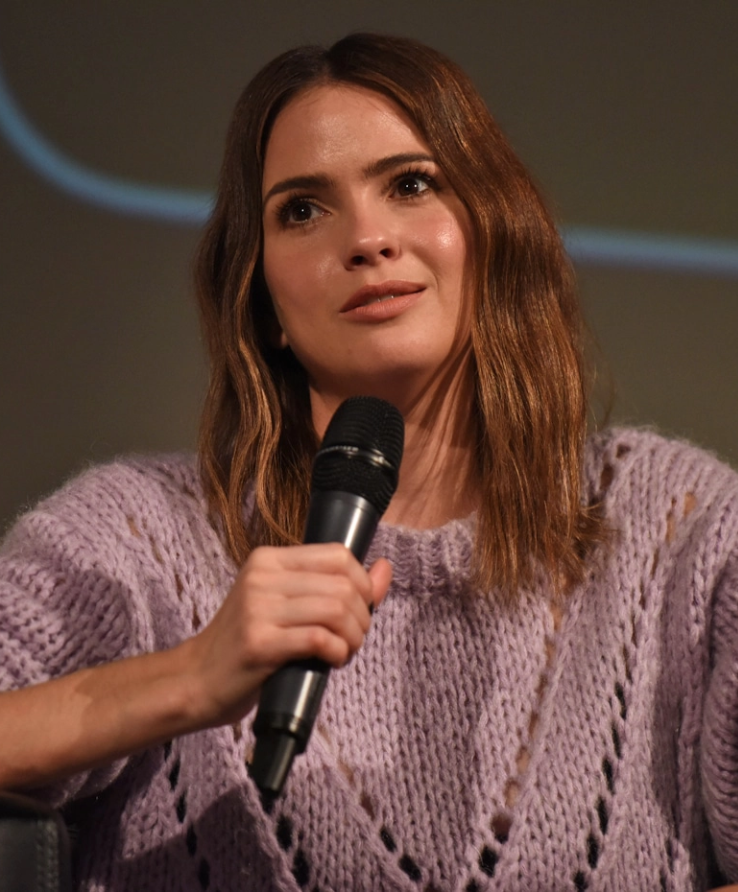
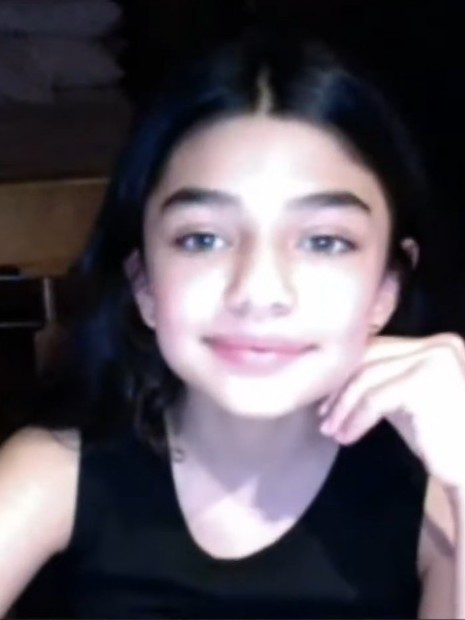
In the series, Kristen Bell (left) plays the witness, Shelley Hennig (middle) the victim, and Samsara Yett (right) the killer.

Wendy O'Brien served as the casting director. On February 19, 2021, Tom Riley joined the main cast. On March 2, Mary Holland, Shelley Hennig, Christina Anthony, Samsara Yett, Cameron Britton, and Benjamin Levy Aguilar were cast in starring roles. Principal photography took place at different locations in California during March and July, under the working title The Woman in the House, and the series went into the post-production phase in August. On November 10, 2021, it was reported Michael Ealy was cast to star as a lead.

Bell and Ealy had a five-minute dance sequence which was cut from the release. Bell and Yett filmed much of their fight scene themselves, but they did rely on stunt doubles for certain scenes. Yett's parents revealed that they explained her daughter the nature of the show and that she was not yet prepared to watch or understand it, however, they allowed her as a child actress to only follow her scene guidelines. Glenn Close revealed that she joined the cast on one request only, while the character's background was not decided yet.

While filming, grape juice was chosen in place of an actual red wine for Bell's character, but then it was replaced with hibiscus tea to avoid having sugar crash. Most of the rain scenes were shot either during dawn or dusk to portray cloudy weather. The house interior set was designed on different stages, and a private property at Angelino Heights, Los Angeles, was used. The house exterior was filmed at Chapman Woods, Pasadena. Other locations include a police station in Glendale, a shopping store in San Gabriel, a salon in Sierra Madre, and the Mountain View Cemetery, Altadena. John Lindley served as the cinematographer, and he used Sony VENICE camera with Cooke Optics' S4/I lenses, while Pankaj Bajpai served as the colorist. Tara Timpone, Jennifer Van Goethem, and Stephanie Willis served as the editors.

=== Future ===
Although always intended to be a limited series, it ended on a cliffhanger, a scene where Glenn Close was featured. The series creators discussed different ideas for a potential sequel, and Bell hoped that the murders will keep following her character.

== Release ==
On December 8, 2021, the series was given a premiere date of January 28, 2022, with a new title, The Woman in the House Across the Street from the Girl in the Window, and Michael Lehmann was revealed as the director and an executive producer. Described as a satire to the psychological thrillers having "The Woman" and "The Girl" in their titles, Bell defended the long title when Netflix wanted to shorten it as it was intended to poke fun. The 196-minute-series topped on Netflix viewership in the US between January 30 and February 3.

The series draws inspiration from A. J. Finn's The Woman in the Window, Paula Hawkins's The Girl on the Train, Daphne du Maurier's Rebecca, Alfred Hitchcock's Rear Window, and Gillian Flynn's Sharp Objects. Bell's detective role in the series is also inspired by her previous character Veronica Mars, and she also covered the rhyme "Rain Rain Go Away" for the opening theme. Nami Melumad provided the score, and the album consists of 30 tracks.

== Reception ==
On the review aggregator website Rotten Tomatoes, 53% of 60 critics' reviews are positive, with an average rating of 5.80/10. The website's consensus reads: "If this sendup of literary potboilers suffers from being as glacially paced as its own whopper of a title, at least Kristen Bell makes for delightfully deadpan company." Metacritic, which uses a weighted average, assigned a score of 49 out of 100 based on 21 critics, indicating "mixed or average reviews".

Although described as a dark comedy thriller and a spoof mystery series, critical feedback was however divided about the genre execution. (Note: The statement is extracted from the critics of Mashable, Variety,, The Guardian, Arab News, and Seven Days.) The series received praise for creating the curiosity of its suspense from critics like Proma Khosla of Mashable, Matthew Aguilar of ComicBook, Chris Evangelista of /Film, and Cassandra Clarke of CBR. However, critics like Ni'Kesia Pannell of TheKitchn and Micah Yip of CBR were left puzzled with many sequences in the storyline.

Chitra Ramaswamy of The Guardian criticized the tonal confusion as "ludicrous at best and at worst disturbing", Daniel Fienberg of The Hollywood Reporter called the work's fortune "worse" for being "generally bad", Matt Fowler of IGN criticized the overall runtime, Jen Chaney of Vulture called it "blatantly ridiculous" and a "botched experiment", Kristen Baldwin of Entertainment Weekly called it "exhausting", and Daniel D'Addario of Variety noted that the series "isn't mysterious or funny". Sushmita Bose of Khaleej Times called it "a fine crime comedy", and Brian Lowry of CNN called it "enjoyable" but "not enough to generate much enthusiasm". Kristen Lopez of IndieWire commented that the series presents little that is not found in the "countless movies that already litter Netflix about women solving crimes". Laura Miller wrote in Slate that "some of its subtlest jokes" are "pleasingly sharp", but its "subtext" could be done "a lot more".

At the 48th People's Choice Awards, the series was nominated under The Comedy Show of 2022, and Bell had two nominations, namely The Female Star and The Comedy TV Star.
