= Rachel Ramras =

American actress (born 1974)

- Born: Rachel Leah Ramras; Phoenix, Arizona, U.S.
- Other name: Rachel Duguay
- Occupations: Actress; comedian; writer
- Years active: 1993–present
- Spouses: Christian Duguay (divorced); Hugh Davidson (m. 2013)

Rachel Leah Ramras is an American actress, comedian and television writer. In 2017, she, Hugh Davidson and Larry Dorf created and starred in their own TV series, Nobodies.

Ramras has written for Mike Tyson Mysteries on Adult Swim, for which she also voices Mike Tyson's daughter, Yung Hee. Ramras was one of the main writers of The Looney Tunes Show, addition to co-writing direct-to-video film titled Looney Tunes: Rabbits Run and voicing Lola Bunny. She was also a writer on the Disney Channel series The Buzz on Maggie, where she was credited as "Rachel Duguay". She is a member of The Groundlings.

== Filmography ==
=== Actress ===
| Year | Title | Role | Notes |
|---|---|---|---|
| 2000 | The Trouble with Normal | Amber | Episode: "Say Cheese" |
| 2008 | Code Monkeys | Dolly Patron (voice) | Episode: "Dave Gets Boobs" |
| 2008 | Young Person's Guide to History | Woman at Dinner | Episode #1 |
| 2010–2013 | Mad | Various roles (voice) | |
| 2011–2013 | The Looney Tunes Show | Additional voices | |
| 2014 | Elf: Buddy's Musical Christmas | Additional voices | |
| 2014–2020 | Mike Tyson Mysteries | Yung Hee Tyson (voice) | Main role |
| 2015 | Looney Tunes: Rabbits Run | Lola Bunny (voice) | Main role |
| 2015 | Scooby-Doo! and Kiss: Rock and Roll Mystery | Shandi Strutter (voice) | |
| 2017–2018 | Nobodies | Rachel Ramras | Main role |
| 2019 | The News Tank | Rayful Rampass | Episode: "K9 Cops, Denim Survival & Cubicle Farts" |
| 2019 | Mixed-ish | Meredith | Episode: "Papa Don’t Preach" |
| 2021 | Barb and Star Go to Vista Del Mar | Female Sofa Customer | |
| 2022 | The Woman in the House Across the Street from the Girl in the Window | Eileen | Episode: "Episode 3" |
| 2022 | Robot Chicken | Caroline, Kendra (voice) | Episode: "May Cause Indecision... Or Not" |
| 2026 | Robot Chicken Adult Swim Special | Yung Hee Tyson, Orel Puppington (voice) | Television special |

=== Crew member ===
| Year | Title | Notes |
|---|---|---|
| 2002–2003 | Cedric the Entertainer Presents | Writer |
| 2004 | The Nick & Jessica Variety Hour | TV movie |
| 2005 | The Buzz on Maggie | Writer |
| 2007–2008 | Frank TV | Writer |
| 2011–2013 | The Looney Tunes Show | Writer, producer |
| 2014–2020 | Mike Tyson Mysteries | Writer, producer |
| 2015 | Looney Tunes: Rabbits Run | Story, screenplay |
| 2017–2018 | Nobodies | Co-creator, writer, executive producer |
| 2022 | The Woman in the House Across the Street from the Girl in the Window | Co-creator, writer, executive producer |

| Preceded by Kristen Wiig | Voice of Lola Bunny; 2014–2015 | Succeeded by Carla Delaney |
