= Reno 911! =

American comedy television series (2003–2009, 2020–2022)

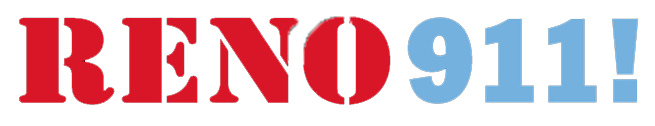
- Also known as: Reno 911! Defunded (season 8)
- Genre: Mockumentary; Sitcom; Black comedy; Workplace comedy; Police procedural; Satire
- Created by: Robert Ben Garant; Thomas Lennon; Kerri Kenney-Silver
- Starring: Cedric Yarbrough; Niecy Nash; Robert Ben Garant; Thomas Lennon; Carlos Alazraqui; Kerri Kenney-Silver; Wendi McLendon-Covey; Mary Birdsong; Ian Roberts; Joe Lo Truglio
- Theme music composer: Craig Wedren
- Composers: Stephen Phillips & Tim P. (seasons 1–6); Craig Wedren (seasons 7–8)
- Country of origin: United States
- No. of seasons: 8
- No. of episodes: 124 (list of episodes)

Production
- Camera setup: Single camera
- Running time: 21–23 minutes (seasons 1–6, 8); 7 minutes (season 7)
- Production companies: Jersey Television (2003–09); High Sierra Carpeting (2009, 2020–22); Comedy Partners; MTV Entertainment Studios (2020–22)

Original release
- Network: Comedy Central
- Release: July 23, 2003 – July 8, 2009
- Network: Quibi (2020); The Roku Channel (2022)
- Release: May 4, 2020 – February 25, 2022

Reno 911! is an American television sitcom created by Robert Ben Garant, Thomas Lennon and Kerri Kenney-Silver for Comedy Central. It is a mockumentary-style parody of law enforcement documentary shows, specifically Cops, with comic actors playing the police officers. Lennon, Garant and Kenney-Silver all starred in and are billed as creators of the series.

The series initially aired from 2003 to 2009 on Comedy Central. A revival premiered on May 4, 2020, on streaming platform Quibi, which was renewed for an additional season (the show's eighth) on September 3, 2020. Quibi later announced in October 2020 that it would be shutting down while the eighth season was in production. According to star Niecy Nash, the eighth season would debut on another platform, which was later revealed to be The Roku Channel. The eighth season, entitled Defunded, premiered on February 25, 2022, on The Roku Channel.

== Premise ==
The show is a direct parody of the reality show Cops, which follows actual police officers through their daily duties, such as chasing criminals, and intervening in domestic disputes. Reno 911! features members of the fictitious, massively inept "Reno Sheriff's Department" (in reality, Reno is under the jurisdiction of the Reno Police Department and the Washoe County Sheriff's Office). In the course of their duties patrolling both the city of Reno and the rest of Washoe County, Nevada, the deputies sometimes address the camera directly (as though being interviewed for a documentary). The show deals heavily in politically incorrect and racy humor, including many jokes about race, sexual orientation, substance abuse, rape, pedophilia, and mental disorders. Another main comic aspect of the show is the outlandishly severe incompetence of the deputies, often resulting in their being outsmarted by the criminals they are attempting to control.

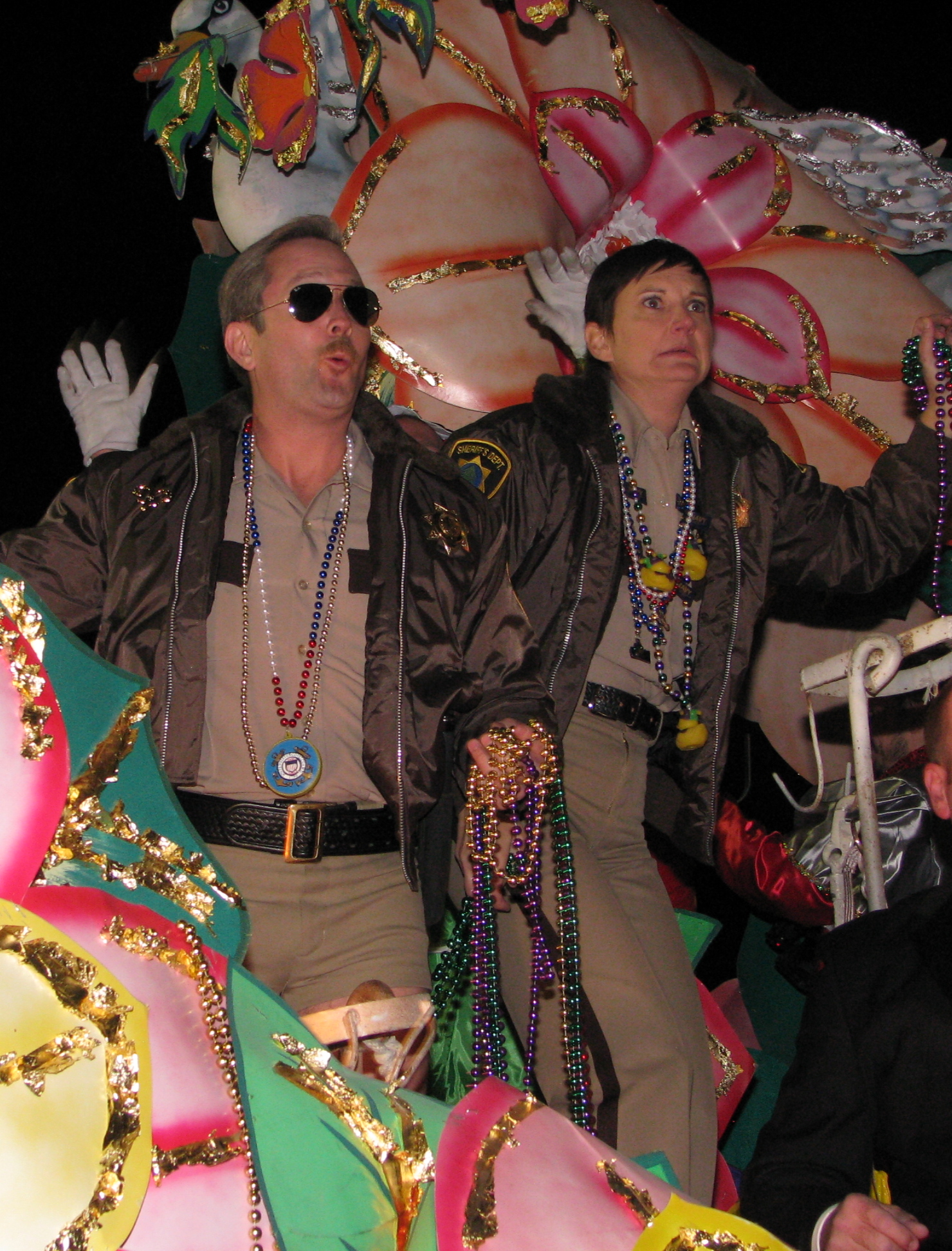
Lennon and Kenney-Silver in character at Mardi Gras

Unlike Cops, which the show parodies, Reno 911! Sheriff's deputies are constantly cursing, causing much of their dialogue to be censored for broadcast. The actors often perform their own stunts. Criminals on the series are portrayed by a variety of comedians, and sometimes by main cast members performing a dual role; in these instances, the cast member's face will be blurred in the style of Cops.

The show's characters occasionally refer to their own program. They insist that the show's producers told them the videotaped footage was going to be used for a Fox Television documentary series titled Heroes on Patrol, and often say in frustration that they have no control over what is aired, and that the show only seems to capture their moments of incompetence. The many "good" incidents, they allege, are left out of the (show-within-a-show's) final edit. Also, some suspects in the show refer to the film crew, and the program being aired on television; occasionally, they will attempt to get arrested just to be on TV.

== History ==
=== Development ===
In Lennon's words, Reno 911! came about, "like the best of ideas, through total desperation." Following the end of Viva Variety, The State alumnus worked on a series of pilots for the Fox Broadcasting Company, one of which, after a year's worth of dedicated writing, was terminated the day before shooting. It was scheduled to begin in the fall of 2000. With a month left before the pilot was expected to be due (and half of the budget still unused), the team asked if they could produce another pilot with the remaining resources, and the Fox executives agreed. Working quickly to take advantage of this, the initial Reno 911! pilot was conceived and shot in five days. Cedric Yarbrough, who had been hired for the cast of the canceled pilot, said that the cast was advised to "come up with [their] own characters" and return for filming.

As originally written, the sheriff's department material would have served as link material between traditional comedy sketches; the canceled project was being considered for the Fox Saturday lineup, and the team thought at the time that the Cops format was a natural framework for sketch comedy. However, during the shooting—and especially the editing—they realized the police element was more interesting than the sketches, and the finished pilot was, according to Garant, "remarkably similar" to the series that eventually aired. Nevertheless, Fox turned down the completed pilot. According to Lennon, their decision not to pick the show up was influenced by a scene, preserved in the eventual Comedy Central pilot, involving Lt. Dangle passionately kissing a man. It was another two years before Comedy Central greenlit the project.

=== Filming ===
Establishing shots were filmed on location in Reno, with everything else in Los Angeles and Carson, California, with some parts in Oregon.

Starting from the fifth season onward, certain segments are also shot in the small town of Piru, California. The exterior and interior shots of the Reno Sheriff's Department station were filmed on location at the Los Angeles County Sheriff's Department substation in Carson. Many of the main scenes of the show were shot over the course of many hours, such as the briefing room scenes. According to the third season DVD commentary, all morning briefing scenes for a season may be filmed on one 10-hour day with different basic plot elements to be used in different episodes. Actors would contribute their dialogue as they were inspired to do so.

=== Original run ===
Reno 911! continued for two additional seasons with a special, entitled Off Duty, on March 21, 2004.

The first half of the fourth season, comprising 7 episodes, began on July 9, 2006. In February 2007, a theatrical film, Reno 911!: Miami, was released in North America, featuring the complete series cast. It was a moderate box office success, grossing $22 million worldwide. The second half of season 4, another 7 episodes, drew 1.3 million viewers during the week of March 26 to April 1, 2007.

On October 9, 2006, Comedy Central confirmed 13 new episodes to make up a fifth season, though the season actually contained 16 episodes. Production started in January and wrapped in April. Season 5 premiered on January 16, 2008.

On March 27, 2007, Superstation WGN acquired the first four seasons for a two-year run. The syndicated Reno 911! is a part of their late night comedy block. Reruns are syndicated to broadcast stations. Lennon and Garant later appeared in-character on a comedy compilation CD, Comedy Death-Ray, released on September 11, 2007, singing a song about why not to use drugs.

On November 10, 2008, Comedy Central confirmed 10 new episodes to make up a sixth and final season. Principal photography was done between November and December 2008. Carmen Electra was a guest star on an episode filmed December 5, 2008, at Grant High School in Los Angeles. Season Six premiered on April 1, 2009, on Comedy Central. Season 6 consisted of fifteen episodes. Cast members Alazraqui, McLendon-Covey and Birdsong did not return for the final season and their characters' absences were explained as fatalities from an explosion in the fifth season finale. Additionally, actors Ian Roberts and Joe Lo Truglio were added to the principal cast as Sergeant Jack Declan and Deputy Frank Salvatore Rizzo, respectively.

On August 13, 2009, Lennon announced through Twitter that the show had ended its six-year run. In response to the cancellation, Reno residents and officials petitioned to save the show.

=== Revival ===
In October 2011, a story broke that the producers were in negotiations with the streaming service Netflix for a revival. The primary reason producers wanted to revive the show was because only 88 episodes were produced, and they and syndicating networks would have liked for the show to reach 100 episodes. However, at the time, Comedy Central, who still held sole rights, had not been involved in any negotiations. Furthermore, Lennon and Garant were attached to other projects.

It was announced on December 6, 2019, that the series would be revived in 2020 on streaming platform Quibi. The revival featured the return of the original series creators Lennon, Garant and Kenney-Silver. In a statement, Lennon said: "Reno 911! holds a special place in our hearts, and it will be a delight to get the original cast back together for 're-boot goofin'. Hopefully Nick Swardson can still roller skate. Quibi's short format seems custom made for our show."

Filming of the seventh season started in early 2020, where the production crew was spotted in Piru, California, on February 23, 2020. On April 10, 2020, it was announced that the revival was set to premiere on May 4, 2020. On September 3, 2020, the show was renewed for an eighth season. On October 23, 2020, it was announced that Quibi would be shutting down. The eighth season, titled Reno 911! Defunded, made its debut on The Roku Channel on February 25, 2022. On September 7, 2023, it was reported that the series was removed from the service. All seasons of Reno 911! are currently available on the streaming service Paramount+. As of September 25, 2026, the series is available on Prime Video.

== Episodes ==
For the seventh season, the episodes were re-edited in eight 21 minute episodes.

- 01 Let's Shoot a White Guy
- 02 Concealed Carry Fashion Show
- 03 Jackie’s Birthday
- 04 Truckee River Revenge
- 05 Coyote Hazing
- 06 Space Force
- 07 Weekend at Bernie
- 08 The Return of Diablo

| Season | Episodes | Originally released | | |
| Season | Episodes | First released | Last released | Network |
|---|---|---|---|---|
| 1 | 14 | July 23, 2003 | October 20, 2003 | Comedy Central |
| 2 | 16 | June 9, 2004 | September 22, 2004 | Comedy Central |
| 3 | 13 | June 14, 2005 | September 6, 2005 | Comedy Central |
| 4 | 14 | July 9, 2006 | May 13, 2007 | Comedy Central |
| Miami | | February 23, 2007 | | Theatrical release |
| 5 | 16 | January 16, 2008 | July 10, 2008 | Comedy Central |
| 6 | 15 | April 1, 2009 | July 8, 2009 | Comedy Central |
| 7 | 25 | May 4, 2020 | September 7, 2020 | Quibi |
| The Hunt for QAnon | | December 23, 2021 | | Paramount+ |
| 8 | 11 | February 25, 2022 | | The Roku Channel |
| It's a Wonderful Heist | | December 3, 2022 | | Comedy Central |

== Characters ==
Left to right: Dep. Travis Junior, Dep. James Garcia, Lt. Jim Dangle, Dep. Trudy Wiegel, Dep. Raineesha Williams, Dep. Clementine Johnson and Dep. S. Jones

| Actor | Character | Seasons | | | | | | | |
| Actor | Character | 1 | 2 | 3 | 4 | 5 | 6 | 7 | 8 |
|---|---|---|---|---|---|---|---|---|---|
| Thomas Lennon | Lieutenant Jim Dangle | M | M | M | M | M | M | M | M |
| Kerri Kenney-Silver | Deputy Trudy Wiegel | M | M | M | M | M | M | M | M |
| Robert Ben Garant | Deputy Travis Junior | M | M | M | M | M | M | M | M |
| Cedric Yarbrough | Deputy Sven Jones | M | M | M | M | M | M | M | M |
| Niecy Nash | Deputy Raineesha Williams | M | M | M | M | M | M | M | M |
| Carlos Alazraqui | Deputy James Oswaldo Garcia | M | M | M | M | M | | M | M |
| Wendi McLendon-Covey | Deputy Clementine Johnson | M | M | M | M | M | | M | M |
| Mary Birdsong | Deputy Cherisha Kimball | | | M | M | M | | M | M |
| Ian Roberts | Sergeant Jack Declan | | | | | | M | M | M |
| Joe Lo Truglio | Deputy Frank Salvatore Rizzo | | | | | | M | M | M |

Season six newcomers Joe Lo Truglio and Ian Roberts had appeared as guest stars in past seasons, and both also appeared in Reno 911: Miami. As a member of The State, Lo Truglio is an old friend of the three creators and has worked with them on numerous projects. Roberts is a founding member of the popular Upright Citizens Brigade improv comedy troupe, who had their own Comedy Central sketch show from 1998 to 2000. Other members of the troupe (Matt Besser and Matt Walsh) also appeared in recurring guest roles throughout the seasons. Amy Poehler is the only member of the "UCB 4" to have never appeared on the show in any form.

Throughout the show's run, all three main cast members from Stella (who were also from The State) made appearances as characters. While Michael Showalter was the exception on the TV series, he appeared in the film, along with all of the cast members of The State.

"The State" Crossovers
| Actor | On Reno 911! | In Reno 911: Miami |
| Thomas Lennon | Lt. Jim Dangle | |
| Robert Ben Garant | Deputy Travis Junior | |
| Kerri Kenney-Silver | Deputy Trudy Wiegel | |
| Michael Patrick Jann | Director | Tattoo Shop Owner #1 |
| Joe Lo Truglio | Shopkeeper (Season 3); Deputy Frank Rizzo (Seasons 6 - 7) | Tattoo Shop Owner #2 |
| Ken Marino | Frank (Season 1); Cadet Jared Reese (Season 3); Sgt. Andrew Blake (Season 5) | Deaf Tattoo Artist |
| David Wain | Sensual Masseur (Season 1); Sam (Season 5) | Breen the Plumber |
| Michael Ian Black | Kevin the Sex Offender (Season 1); Chris (Seasons 2 & 5); Hatzolah Captain Schwartz (Season 7) | Ron of Ron's Tattoo |
| Kevin Allison | N/A | Tattoo Victim |
| Michael Showalter | N/A | Paul |
| Todd Holoubek | N/A | Tattooed Guy |

=== Main crew members ===
- Danny DeVito – executive producer
- Michael Shamberg – executive producer
- Stacey Sher – executive producer
- John Landgraf – executive producer
- Peter Principato – executive producer
- Paul Young – executive producer
- Robert Ben Garant – creator
- Kerri Kenney-Silver – creator
- Thomas Lennon – creator
- Michael Patrick Jann – director

== Awards and nominations ==
| Year | Award | Category | Nominee(s) | Result | Ref. |
|---|---|---|---|---|---|
| 2004 | GLAAD Media Awards | Outstanding Comedy Series | Reno 911! | Nominated | |
| 2010 | Gracie Awards | Outstanding Supporting Actress in a Comedy Series | Niecy Nash | Won | |
| 2020 | Primetime Emmy Awards | Outstanding Short Form Comedy or Drama Series | Thomas Lennon, Robert Ben Garant, Kerri Kenney-Silver, John Landgraf, Peter Principato and David Lincoln | Nominated | |
| 2020 | Primetime Emmy Awards | Outstanding Actress in a Short Form Comedy or Drama Series | Kerri Kenney-Silver | Nominated | |
| 2021 | Critics' Choice Television Awards | Best Short Form Series | Reno 911! | Nominated | |
| 2021 | Primetime Emmy Awards | Outstanding Short Form Comedy or Drama Series | Thomas Lennon, Robert Ben Garant, Kerri Kenney-Silver, John Landgraf, Peter Principato and David Lincoln | Nominated | |
| 2021 | Primetime Emmy Awards | Outstanding Actress in a Short Form Comedy or Drama Series | Kerri Kenney-Silver | Nominated | |

== Films ==
The series spawned a film released in 2007. In the film, the deputies are called in to save the day after a terrorist attack disrupts a national police convention and locks over 2,000 police officers in a hotel in Miami Beach during spring break.

In December 2017, Nash said another film is in the works, but it is unknown if it evolved into anything that came after.

On December 23, 2021, Reno 911! The Hunt for QAnon was released on Paramount+. The film involves the deputies of the Reno Sheriff's Department as they hunt for Q, the one behind all of the QAnon conspiracies. Their efforts cause them to get stuck at a QAnon convention at sea.

On October 28, 2022, a third movie was announced to be released on Comedy Central. A Christmas movie titled Reno 911! It's a Wonderful Heist it premiered December 3, 2022.

== Home media ==
| DVD title | Release date | No. of episodes | Additional information |
|---|---|---|---|
| The Complete First Season | June 22, 2004 | 14 | Alternate Scenes, Audio Commentary from the entire cast. |
| The Complete Second Season Uncensored | June 14, 2005 | 16 | Over 90 minutes of Alternate/Deleted Scenes, director and Cast Commentary, Drug Arrest Prevention Seminar – Live Performance from HBO's 2004 U.S. Comedy Arts Festival. |
| The Complete Third Season Uncensored | July 11, 2006 | 13 | Deleted scenes, extended outtakes, and commentary with the cast and crew. |
| The Complete Fourth Season Uncensored | June 26, 2007 | 14 | Alternate/Deleted scenes, extended outtakes, and commentary with the cast and crew. |
| The Complete Fifth Season Uncensored | July 15, 2008 | 16 | Alternate/Deleted scenes, extended outtakes, Featurette: Cop Psychology Inside the Minds of Reno's deputies. |
| The Complete Sixth Season Uncensored | July 7, 2009 | 15 | Alternate/Deleted scenes, extended outtakes, and commentary. |

| DVD Name | Release date | Additional information |
|---|---|---|
| Reno 911!: Miami | June 19, 2007 | Audio Commentary, Alternate / Extended Scenes, Trailers, Easter Eggs, and the featurette "Making a Spoof." |
| Reno 911!: Miami: Unrated | June 19, 2007 | Audio commentary, Alternate / Extended Scenes, Trailers, Easter Eggs, Public Service Announcements, and the featurette "World Premiere." |
| Reno 911!: Miami: More Busted Than Ever Unrated Edition | September 23, 2008 | Intro to "The Lost Version", Audio commentary, Extended Scenes with optional commentary, Blooper Reel, Public Service Announcements, Theatrical Trailer, Easter Eggs. |

Best of Releases

| DVD name | Release date | Additional information |
|---|---|---|
| Reno's Most Wanted Uncensored | February 13, 2007 | A compilation of Reno 911!'s best scenes from the first four seasons. |
