= Adam Ray =

American comedian, actor, and YouTuber (born 1982)

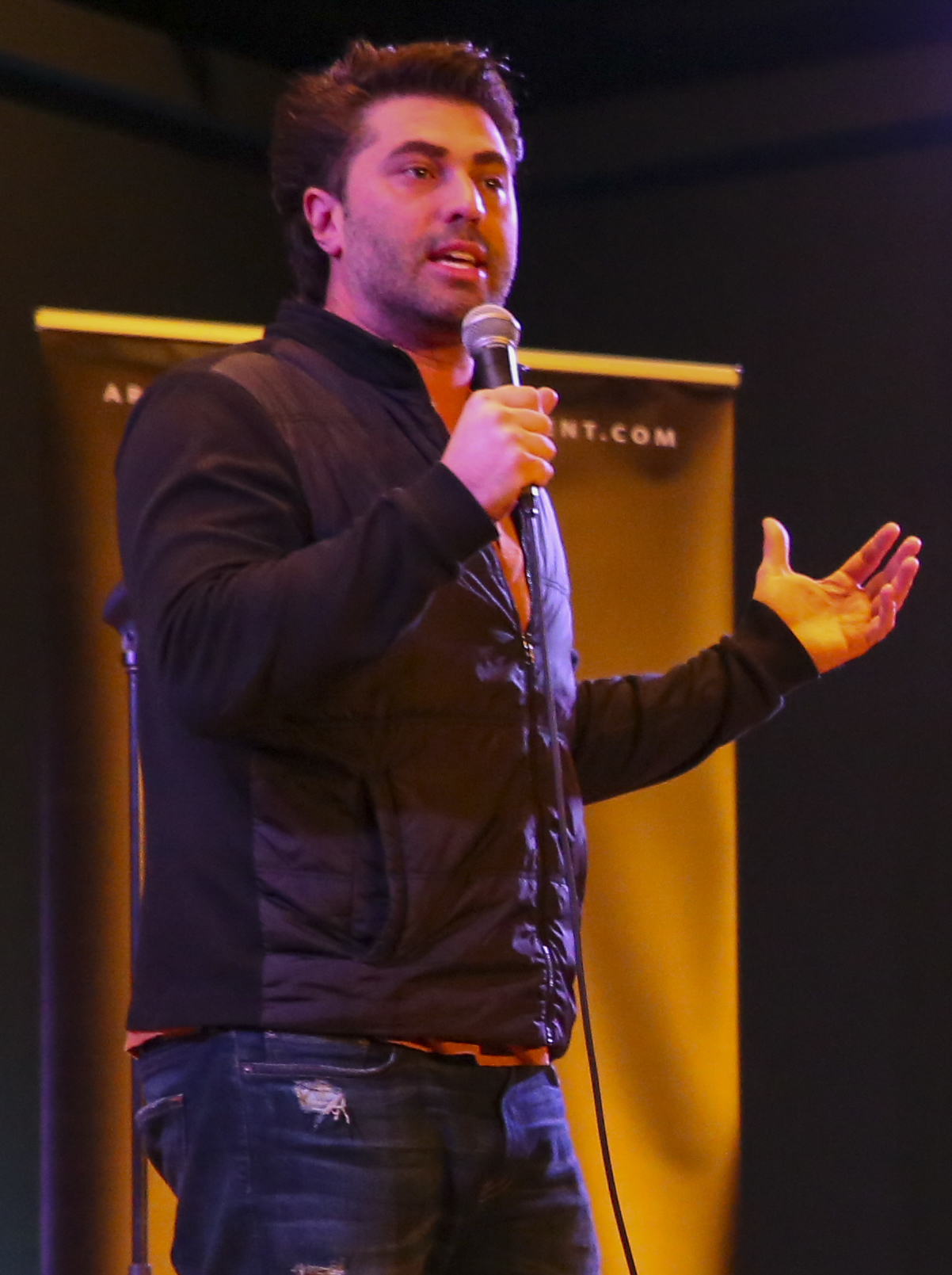
- Ray performing at Camp Kinser in Okinawa, Japan in 2018
- Born: June 16, 1982 (age 44); Seattle, Washington, U.S.
- Education: University of Southern California (BFA)
- Spouse: Amanda Ray (m. 2022)

Comedy career
- Years active: 2006–present
- Medium: Stand-up; television; film; podcast
- Genres: Improvisational comedy; character comedy; sketch comedy; insult comedy; impressions; satire
- Subjects: American culture; American politics; everyday life; pop culture; current events
- Website: adamraycomedy.com

Adam Ray (born June 16, 1982) is an American comedian, actor, and YouTuber. He garnered significant attention from regularly performing stand-up and improv comedy under the persona of "Dr. Phil", a parody of "Dr. Phil" McGraw, since 2023. Ray is also known for his impressions of other personalities and comedians.

== Early life ==
Ray was raised in Seattle and attended Shorecrest High School. He is of Jewish descent. He earned a Bachelor of Fine Arts degree from the University of Southern California.

== Career ==
Ray joined the YouTube community under the username of "adamraycomedy" and has 679 thousand subscribers with more than 209 million views. His voice has been featured in advertisements for McDonald's, Hyundai, Brooks Brothers, the San Diego Zoo Zebra Exhibit, and Burger King.

=== Dr. Phil persona ===
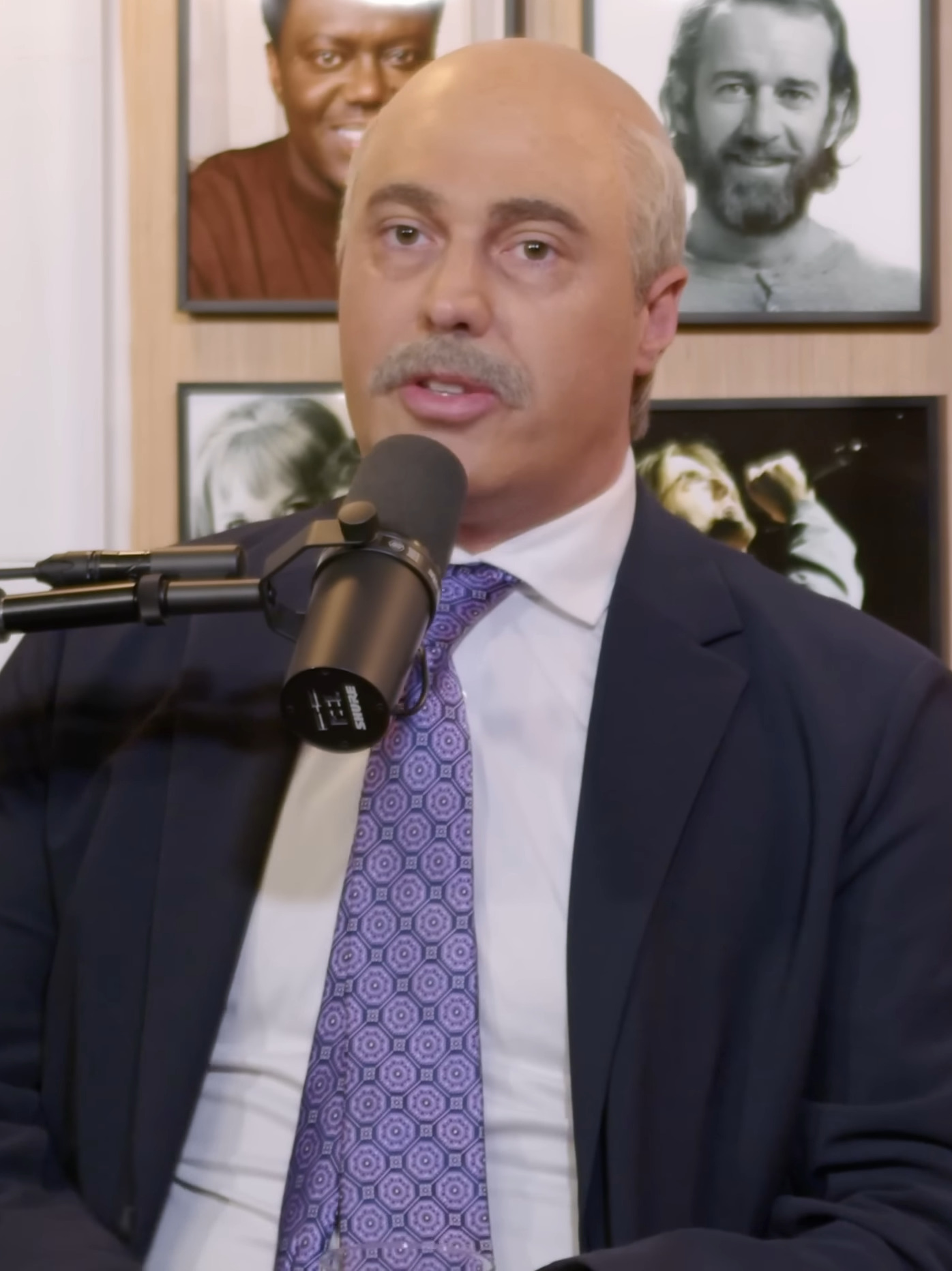
Ray in character as "Dr. Phil" in 2024

In 2019, Ray began performing full-length stand-up comedy routines as "Dr. Phil", a parody of "Dr. Phil" McGraw. Ray was playing a character based on McGraw for a pilot episode of a comedy show, and decided to keep wearing the prosthetics while performing at a Laugh Factory. Following positive feedback, Ray began to develop the character, which Ray describes as "a late-night version of a daytime guy". In 2023, Ray began producing monthly shows at the Comedy Store in Los Angeles based around "Dr. Phil" interacting with other comedians, which were then uploaded to YouTube. The shows resulted in a notable increase in attention around Ray as well as an endorsement from McGraw himself.

In November 2024, Netflix aired an Adam Ray comedy special which saw Ray in the "Dr. Phil" persona meeting Phil McGraw face-to-face as well as interviews with Patton Oswalt and Jay Pharoah.

== Influences ==
Ray has said that his comedy influences are Chris Farley, Eddie Murphy, Jim Carrey, and Adam Sandler.

== Filmography ==
=== Film ===
Year	Title	Role	Notes
2008	An American Standard	Ryan	Short film
2008	The Travis McFarland Club	Bobby	Short film
2010	Santa's Xmas Party	Adam	Short film
2011	Axe: Dirtcathlon	Angry Italian Chef	Short film
2011	Jake Arrives	Jake	Short film
2013	The Heat	LeSoire	
2013	Project Tennessee	Adam	Short film
2014	Kay Valentine's Day Commercial Parody	Husband	Short film
2015	Spy	Agent in Jetpack	
2016	Ghostbusters	Lead Singer / Slimer (voice)	
2017	Handsome	Devon	
2018	Game Over, Man!	Officer Dan	
2018	Second Act	Technician	
2020	The Bellmen	Steve	
2021	Good on Paper	Drunk Jerk	
2022	The School for Good and Evil	Town Tough	
2023	Barbie	Policeman	
2023	Love Virtually	Bouncer	
2023	Soda	Bleeding Man	Short film
2024	Jackpot	Asshole Dad	
2026	Jackass: Best and Last	Himself / 1W-Larry (voice)	Guest appearances

=== Television ===
Year	Title	Role	Notes
2007	Human Giant	Tom Cruise	Episode: "Most Pit!"
2007	Nick Cannon Presents: Short Circuitz	Guy	Episode #1.7
2008	According to Jim	Brad	Episode: "The Hot Wife"
2009	Ted Sampon: Househusband	Smarm	Episode: "Married... Again!"
2009	Drunks Vs. Highs	High	Television film
2011	Appleseed Elementary	Principal Cramer	5 episodes
2012	2 Broke Girls	Tony	2 episodes
2012	A Guy Walks Into a Bar	Bartender	14 episodes
2012	NTSF:SD:SUV::	Fineman	Episode: "Sabbath-tage"
2012–13	Ash Global	Denny	6 episodes
2013	Workaholics	Mark McGrath Dude	Episode: "In Line"
2013	Knifeguard	Ed	Miniseries
2014	Rick and Morty	Johnny / Wife Beater	Episode: "Rixty Minutes"
2014	Real Husbands of Hollywood	Agent	Episode: "Don't Vote for Nick"
2015	Silicon Valley		Episode: "Server Space"
2016	Hit the Floor		Episode: "Loss"
2016	Mad TV	Various	8 episodes
2017	Return of the Mac	Alex	8 episodes
2017	Curb Your Enthusiasm	Uber Driver #2	Episode: "Namaste"
2018	Nobodies	Club Goer	Episode: "Open Dorf Policy"
2018	American Vandal	Officer Joe Crowder	6 episodes
2018	Ballers		Episode: "The Kids Are Aight"
2018	Trolls: The Beat Goes On!	Slamm-Oh	Episode: "Party Crashed"
2018–19	Arrested Development	Al	3 episodes
2018–20	She-Ra and the Princesses of Power	Swift Wind	26 episodes
2019	Robot Chicken	Imperial Recruitment Officer / Jambi (voice)	Episode: "Fila Ogden in: Maggie's Got a Full Load"
2019, 2020	Archibald's Next Big Thing	Dilbert Tuxington III / Johnny Hawkstorm (voice)	3 episodes
2020–21	Crossing Swords	Ruben (voice)	16 episodes
2020–22	Doug Unplugs	Safety Bot	8 episodes
2021	American Dad!	Emcee (voice)	Episode: "Stan Moves to Chicago"
2021	Hacks	Drew Higgins	Episode: "1.69 Million"
2021	When Nature Calls with Helen Mirren		2 episodes
2021	Archibald's Next Big Thing Is Here!	Johnny Hawkstorm	Episode: "Johnny Hawkstorm: Two Birds, One Stone"
2021	Fairfax	Jim	Episode: "Dale Hates His Dad"
2021–23	Young Rock	Vince McMahon	14 episodes
2022	Pam & Tommy	Jay Leno	3 episodes
2022	Gaslit	Ron Ziegler	3 episodes
2022	Welcome to Flatch	Bert	Episode: "The Tri-state Real Estate Conference"
2022–23	9-1-1: Lone Star	Jaques	2 episodes
2022–23	Welcome to Chippendales	Larry	6 episodes
2023	American Born Chinese	Host	Episode: "Beyond Repair"
2023–24	Dr Phil LIVE!	Dr. Phil	6 episodes
2024	Krapopolis	(voice)	Episode: "Remedial Archeology"
2024–2026	Impractical Jokers	Himself	4 episodes

=== Video games ===
Year	Title	Role
2013	Aliens: Colonial Marines	Marine
2013	Tomb Raider	Solarii
