= Ronna and Beverly =

Talk show and interview podcast

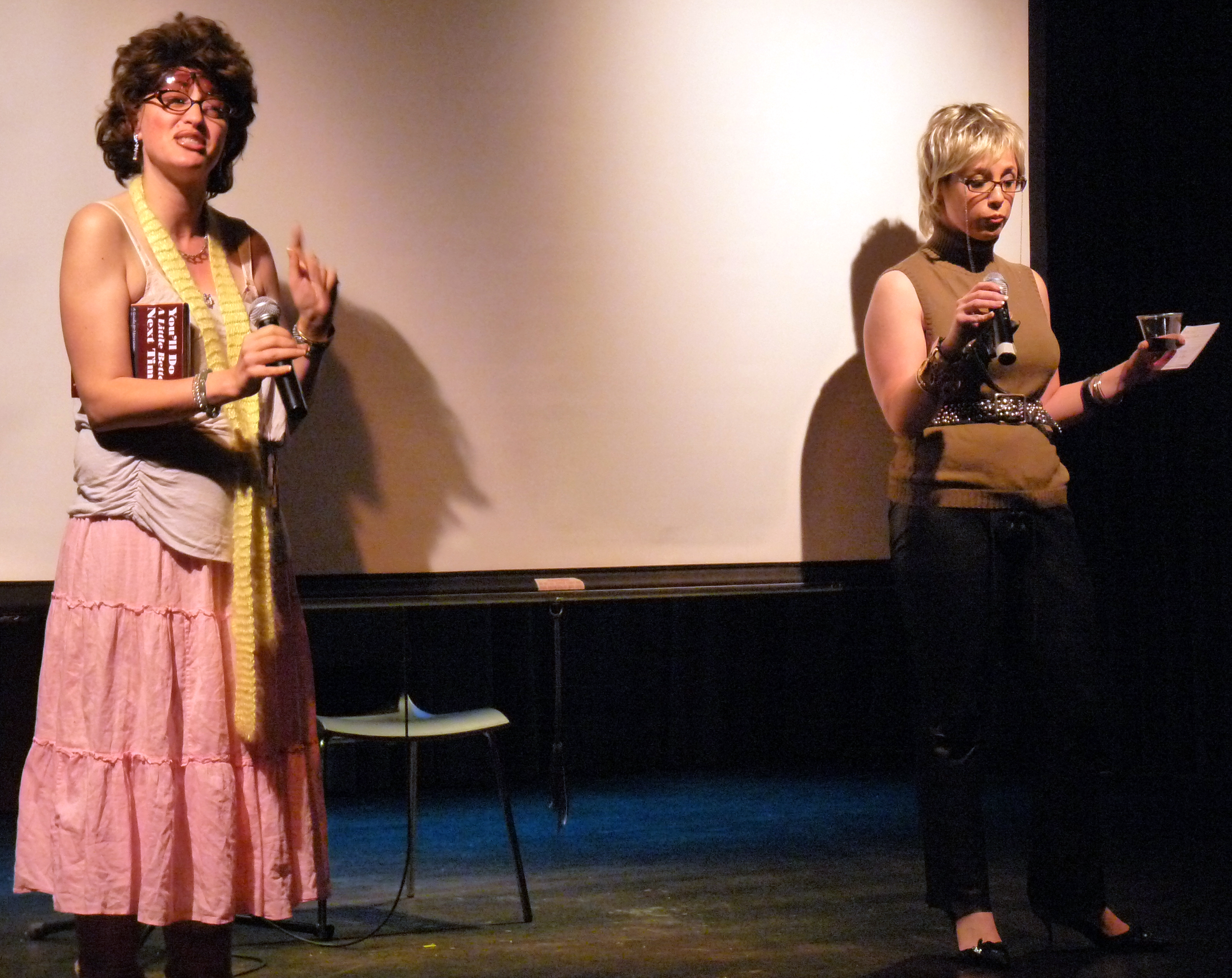
- Beverly (left) and Ronna in 2009
- Genre: Comedy
- Format: Talk Show
- Language: English

Cast and voices
- Hosted by: Ronna Marlene Glickman; Beverly Ginsberg

Publication
- Provider: Earwolf

Related
- Website: ronnaandbeverly.com

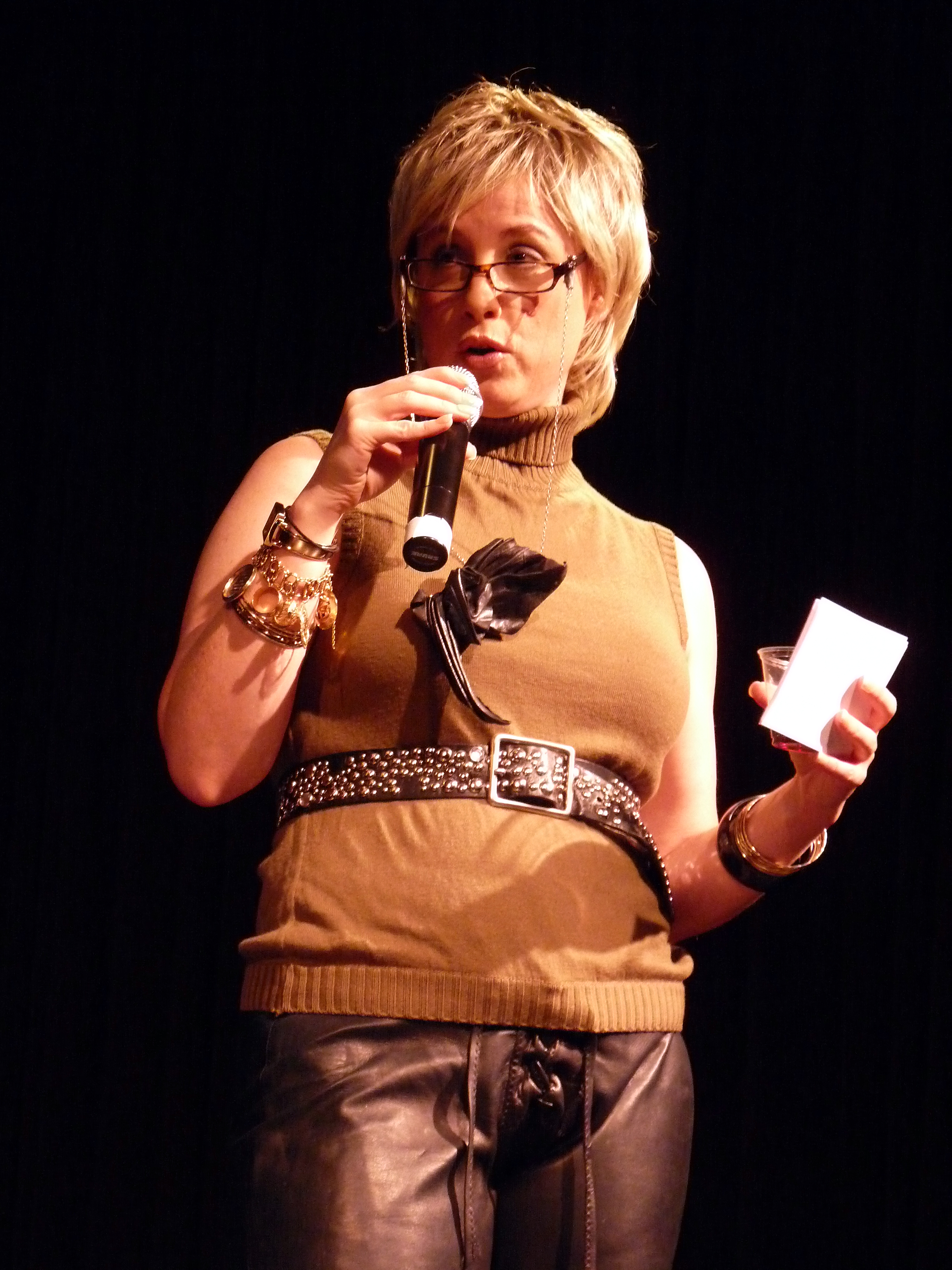
Ronna (Jessica Chaffin) in 2009

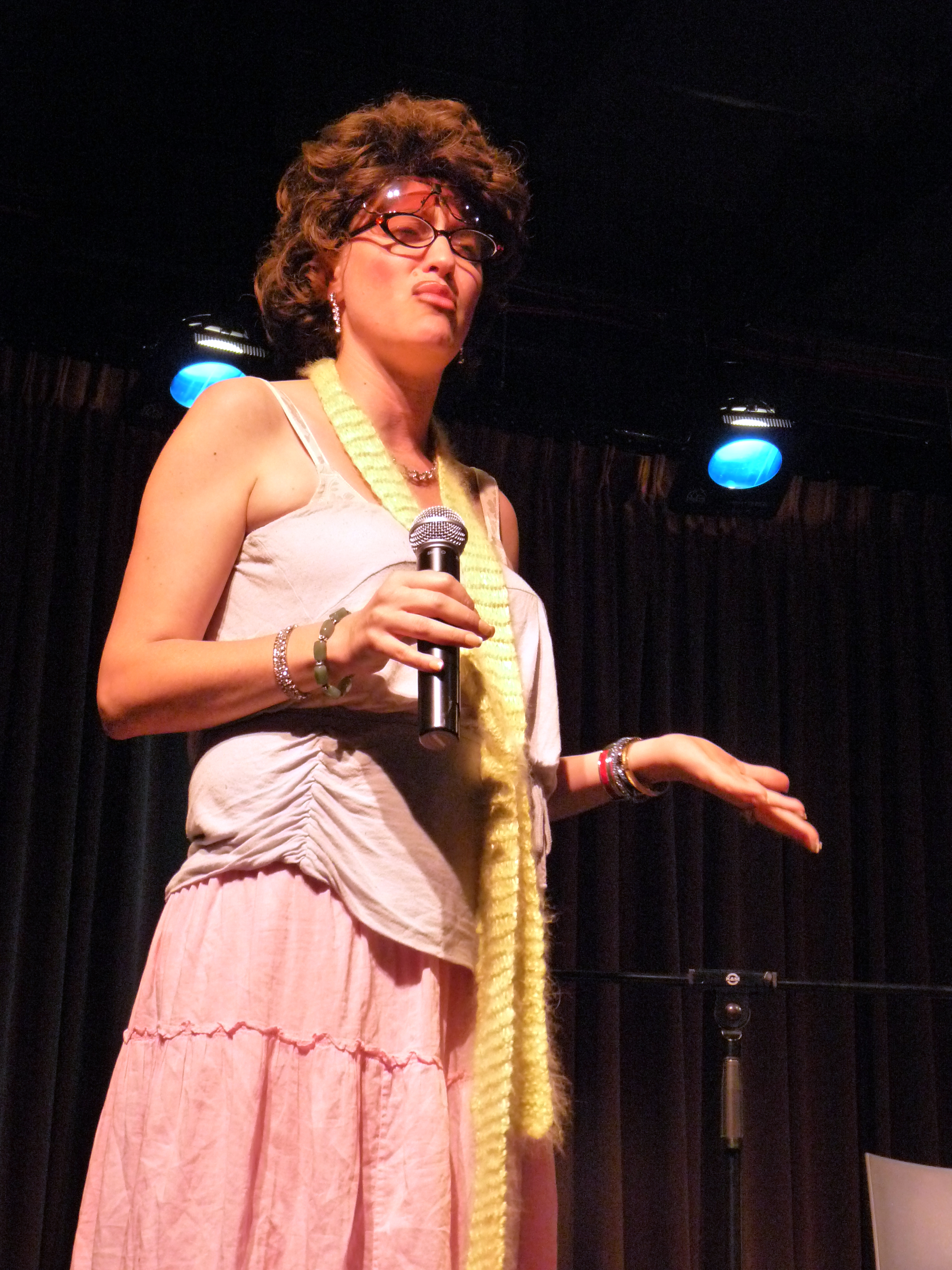
Beverly (Jamie Denbo) in 2009

Ronna Marlene Glickman (née Levine) and Beverly Ginsberg (née Schiff, formerly Ginsberg, Kahn, Frisch) are the 50-something (born 1962) characters created and embodied by actors and comedians Jessica Chaffin and Jamie Denbo. They hosted a podcast on the Earwolf network from 2011 until 2017 wherein they interviewed a celebrity guest, interacted with one another, and dispensed advice to listeners. Chaffin and Denbo developed their characters in 2006 when they were asked to host an all-Jewish 'Kosher Christmas Show' at the Upright Citizens Brigade Theatre.

Live performances from the pair are frequently advertised as "seminars" in which their characters discuss the fictional book they co-authored, "You'll Do a Little Better Next Time: A Guide to Marriage and Re-marriage for Jewish Singles." After introducing the book, either Chaffin or Denbo will often add the clarification, "It says Jewish in the name, but it's for everyone!"

== Podcast ==
Episodes of their eponymous podcast, Ronna and Beverly, were released every two weeks by Earwolf. Guests included people working in comedy, as well as actors, authors, and filmmakers. The podcast premiered on May 25, 2011. In episode 161 on June 15, 2017 (not long after they started teasing the possibility of releasing weekly episodes), Ronna and Beverly suddenly announced they were taking off "for the summer." Since then, no new episodes have been released and the actresses have not appeared together in character. Jessica Chaffin has kept Ronna alive by appearing in character as a guest on other podcasts and by maintaining an Instagram account. On the April 16, 2018, episode of the Why Mommy Drinks podcast, guest Jamie Denbo confirmed that she "used to" have a podcast called Ronna and Beverly, ostensibly indicating the conclusion of the series.

On March 11, 2019, Denbo announced she will be launching a spinoff podcast titled Beverly In LA on Stitcher Premium.

=== Spinoff Podcasts ===
==== Beverly in LA ====
Denbo formerly hosted a solo spin-off podcast on the Stitcher network titled Beverly in LA chronicling the life of Beverly Ginsberg as she pursued wellness and explored various means of living a healthier, more mindful life in Los Angeles.

On June 15, 2020, Denbo posted a photo of her iconic Beverly wig and doubled pair of glasses with the caption "Goodbye and shalom with all the love in my (her) haaaaaaht" to her personal Instagram. On an episode of her podcast "The Human Condition" Denbo spoke, out of character, candidly about her uncertainty of the ethics of portraying Beverly, a racist and conspiracy theorist, for comedy, in light of the Black Lives Matter movement and the political climate in the United States. She announced the retirement of the Beverly character and the subsequent cancellation of her podcast.

==== Ask Ronna ====
In November 2019 Chaffin and co-host Bryan Safi premiered a new podcast called Ask Ronna, in which Chaffin continues to appear as Ronna Glickman. Safi and Chaffin's show focuses on requests for advice and questions from listeners, and often feature a celebrity guest.

== Television ==
In 2009, a television pilot, based on the two women was produced by Showtime, with Jenji Kohan co-writing and co-producing and with Paul Feig directing. The pilot was not picked up.

In 2012, British network Sky Atlantic aired one season of a chat show, starring Ronna and Beverly. The six-episode run was also directed by Paul Feig.

== Live performances ==
Ronna and Beverly performed monthly in Los Angeles at the UCB-LA Theatre. They also brought their show to the Edinburgh Fringe Festival in 2010. The characters made particular fuss over their international lifestyle, and London was a frequent topic of note on their podcast and in print. In 2010, Denbo and Chaffin performed as Ronna and Beverly for a brief run at London's Soho Theatre.

== Podcast episodes ==
Episode #	Title	Guest
1	Julie Klausner	Julie Klausner
2	Paul F. Tompkins	Paul F. Tompkins
3	Justin Kirk	Justin Kirk
4	Paul Feig	Paul Feig
5	Nick Kroll	Nick Kroll
6	Jen Kirkman	Jen Kirkman
7	Andy Richter	Andy Richter
8	Jon Daly	Jon Daly
9	Ana Ortiz	Ana Ortiz
10	Joel Stein	Joel Stein
11	Martha Plimpton	Martha Plimpton
12	Paget Brewster	Paget Brewster
13	Jimmy Pardo	Jimmy Pardo
14	Rob Riggle	Rob Riggle
15	Harris Wittels	Harris Wittels
16	Donna Kagan	Donna Kagan
17	Barbara Vinick	Barbara Vinick
18	David Sabino	David Sabino
19	Vacation Crashing	Heather Donahue
20	London Calling	Jeff Garlin
21	Hollywood's Night to Shine	Joey McIntyre
22	Never Forget	Ilana Glazer, Abbi Jacobson
23	Facebook and Toilet Paper	Natasha Leggero
23.5	Minisode	None
24	Red Leather Yellow Leather	Elizabeth Reaser
25	Museum of Death	Marc Maron
26	Tanlines	Tanlines
27	Superfudge for Girls	Connie Britton
28	Stolen Spanx	Scott Aukerman
29	Gangrene and Ice Cream	Michael Strahan
30	The Kramer of Veep	Matt Walsh
31	Babysitting	Morgan Murphy
32	Not Personal	Steve Agee
33	Alpha-Nerd	John Ross Bowie
34	Jack of All Trades	Brandon Johnson
35	Growing Pains	June Diane Raphael
36	Cartoon Dixie Cup	Brian Huskey
37	Blossom In The Nerds	Kevin Sussman
38	The Podcast Mash	Tony Hale
39	Bar Mitzvah Teddy Bear	Shaun Sperling
40	Animated Picture Frame	Paul Gilmartin
41	Wonderful Podcast Time!	Jake Fogelnest
42	The Live Hanukkah Special	Paul F. Tompkins, Paget Brewster and Angela Kinsey
43	Bubba the Love Nut	Rich Sommer
44	Sephardic Indiana Jones	Gil Ozeri
45	Unlocked Daydreamer	Katie Dippold
46	Live at the San Francisco Sketch Fest	Jonathan Coulton, James Reichmuth
47	Oscar Wrap-Up!	Sam Pancake
48	Hometown Hero	Nate Corddry
49	Passover 2013	None
50	A Nutter Butter	Kevin Pollak
51	Old Fashioned Kitchen Timer	Ted Griffin
52	LIVE with Rob Delaney and David Wain	Rob Delaney, David Wain
53	Gym Rash	Jim Rash
54	Bubble Giggles	Kulap Vilaysack
55	Dagger Fingers	Sarah Baker
56	Young Griffin Dunne	Josh Fadem
57	The See's Proposal	Alison Rosen
58	Peanut Butter Cup	Steve Agee
59	Live From Montreal	Nick Kroll, Andy Kindler
60	LIVE with Ben Schwartz and Mark Feuerstein	Ben Schwartz, Mark Feuerstein
61	Pocket Sass	Judy Reyes
62	I am A Hungry Girl	Lisa Lillien
63	Happy Eyebrows	Adam Ray
64	Live From London	Morwenna Banks, Jonathan Simpson
65	Boyfriend Cloud	Kate Walsh
66	Everyone Makes Mistakes	Andy Daly
67	Happy Thanksgivingkkah	None
68	Uterus Chat	Leslie Grossman
69	LIVE with Nia Vardalos and Bob Harper	Nia Vardalos, Bob Harper
70	LIVE with Jacki Weaver and Patrick J. Adams	Jacki Weaver, Patrick J. Adams
71	German Shepherd On A Leash	Bob Harper
72	Live At Riot L.A.	Paul Scheer
73	Live at the San Francisco Sketch Fest 2014	Michael Ian Black, Bob Harper
74	The Oscar Special	Jace Lacob, Kate Aurthur and Adam B. Vary
75	Myrin Animal	Arden Myrin
76	I Need A Ticket for Rosh Hashanah	Stephen Tobolowsky
77	Jason Nash Bought an Xbox	Jason Nash
78	Viking Tennis	Janet Varney
79	The Advice Show!	None
80	Chocolate Muff	Dana Goodman, Julia Wolov
81	Bikini, Me	David Huntsberger
82	Period Face	Humphrey Ker
83	Crammer or Creamer	Howard Kremer
84	A Fatted Calf	Danielle Schneider, Dannah Phirman
85	Voice of the Internet	Richard Lawson
86	Co Ne Dreee	Eliot Glazer
87	The Laimest Couple In The World	Elizabeth Laime, Andy Rosen
88	Cute as a Baby Seal	Sarah Burns
89	Uber Smart	Jerry O'Connell
90	Just Jenji	Jenji Kohan
91	EGhost Dog	Sean Sakimae
91.5	Ghost of Bob Odenkirk	Bob Odenkirk
92	Eat Over There	Matt Besser
93	Honey Jug	Joe Lo Truglio
94	The Advice Episode!	None
95	LIVE from UCB-Sunset	Jack Black, Paul F. Tompkins
96	Green Grover	Nate Corddry
97	Spatchcock a Chicken	Christopher Noxon
98	I Don't Want To Meetaphobia	Gabrielle Union, Regina Hall
99	Gluten Free Morning	Lindsey Stoddart, Leslie Bibb
100	OSCAR Predictions	Adam B. Vary, Kate Aurthur
101	Modern World Throwback	Tavi Gevinson
102	Candy Crisis	Drew Droege
103	Listener Mail	None
104	Uncle Matty Boy	Eugene Cordero
105	Brewster's Millions	Paget Brewster
106	From Skater Bro to Penguin Goth	Robin Lord Taylor
107	Advice For All!	None
108	Live At UCB with Jeff Garlin, Matt Walsh	Jeff Garlin, Matt Walsh
109	My Body Is Magic	Louis Peitzman
110	Shaq Stomach	Mitch Silpa
111	More Advice for You!	None
112	Mr. Terrific	Echo Kellum
113	Oprah Gayle Underwear	Diablo Cody
114	Quip Fire!	Ellie Kemper
115	From Nannying to Stardom	Katie Lowes
116	Live at UCB with Danny Pudi, Paul F. Tompkins	Danny Pudi, Paul F. Tompkins
117	Advice For Your Life	None
118	01907 The Magazine	Phil Rosenthal
119	Live at UCB with Ravi Patel, Jack McGee	Ravi Patel, Jack McGee
120	Two Bevs Don't Make A Right	Jessica St. Clair
121	Super Joel Stein	Joel Stein
122	My B-Day with Joan Rivers	Gearoid Farrelly
123	Walking Paintbrush	Zoë Bell
124	Advice for 2016!	None
125	Live at the San Francisco Sketch Fest 2016	Guy Branum, Kate Micucci
126	Live at UCB with Ben Feldman, Reid Scott	Ben Feldman, Reid Scott
127	The 2016 OSCAR Podcast	Kate Aurthur, Adam B. Vary, and Jarett Wieselman
128	Kevin Deserves a Sandwich	Kevin Kirkpatrick
129	LIVE at UCB Sunset with Kulap Vilaysack and Michael Constantini	Kulap Vilaysack, Sam Kieffer
130	Bedroom Eyes	Paul W. Downs
131	Advice You Need	None
132	Tip My Beanie	Beanie Feldstein
133	Samurai at Heart	Ally Maki
134	Walk into their Office	Troy Walker
135	Something Something about the Case	Tami Sagher
136	Cuddly Canadian Teddy Bear	Kristian Bruun
137	Live from The Bell House NYC with Ellie Kemper, Wyatt Cenac	Ellie Kemper, Wyatt Cenac
138	Cynthia D'Aprix Sweeney Is An Inspiration	Cynthia D'Aprix Sweeney
139	Jessi Klein Says You Gotta Lie Up	Jessi Klein
140	Rachel Bloom Has A Very Sexual Brain	Rachel Bloom
141	Ben Platt Is A Soul Cycle Fiend	Ben Platt
142	Stay Healthy with Our Advice	None
143	Foxy Knoxy with Leslie Grossman and Adam O'Byrne	Leslie Grossman, Adam O'Byrne
144	English Chocolate Passion with Matt Cook	Matt Cook
145	Live at Now Hear This with Jimmy Pardo	Jimmy Pardo
145.5	Bonus Episode: Matt McConkey	Matt McConkey
146	Jordan Black Is A Popper	Jordan Black
147	Live from Boston Jewish Film Festival with Eugene Mirman	Eugene Mirman
148	Charles Rogers Is A Voice of the Generation	Charles Rogers
149	D'Arcy Carden Added The Apostrophe Herself	D'Arcy Carden
150	Pam Fryman Does It Effortlessly	Pam Fryman
151	Ana Ortiz Knows How To March	Ana Ortiz
152	LIVE from the SF Sketchfest with James Urbaniak and Arden Myrin	James Urbaniak, Arden Myrin
153	The 2017 OSCAR Podcast	Adam B. Vary, Jarett Wieselman and Kate Aurthur
154	SNL's Chris Kelly Heads the Sketch	Chris Kelly
155	Michael and Sarah Bennett Help You Choose Wisely	Dr. Michael I. Bennett, Sarah Bennett
156	Santina Muha Doesn't See Wheels	Santina Muha
157	Dave Holmes Gets His Preps	Dave Holmes
158	LIVE from Largo with Paul F. Tompkins and America Ferrera	Paul F. Tompkins, America Ferrera
159	Live from the 9:30 Club with Ned Price	Ned Price
160	Live from The Bell House with Chris Gethard and Rachel Dratch	Chris Gethard, Rachel Dratch
161	Live from The Bell House with Jill Kargman and Robin Lord Taylor	Jill Kargman, Robin Lord Taylor
