= Tiny Toons Looniversity =

American animated sitcom

- Genre: Satire; Slapstick; Animated sitcom
- Created by: Erin Gibson; Nate Cash
- Based on: Tiny Toon Adventures by Tom Ruegger Looney Tunes by Warner Bros.
- Developed by: Erin Gibson; Nate Cash
- Showrunners: Erin Gibson; Nate Cash
- Voices of: Eric Bauza; Ashleigh Crystal Hairston; David Errigo Jr.; Tessa Netting
- Theme music composer: Bruce Broughton
- Opening theme: "Tiny Toons Looniversity Theme" by Eric Bauza, Ashleigh Crystal Hairston, David Errigo Jr. and Tessa Netting
- Composer: Matthew Janszen
- Country of origin: United States
- Original language: English
- No. of seasons: 2
- No. of episodes: 23

Production
- Executive producers: Steven Spielberg; Justin Falvey; Darryl Frank; Erin Gibson; Nate Cash; Sam Register
- Producer: Adam Middleton
- Editor: Brant Duncan
- Running time: 22 minutes (regular series); 42 minutes (specials)
- Production companies: Amblin Television; Warner Bros. Animation

Original release
- Network: Cartoon Network; Max
- Release: September 8, 2023 – March 22, 2025

Related
- Tiny Toon Adventures (1990–1992)

Tiny Toons Looniversity is an American animated sitcom created and developed by Erin Gibson and Nate Cash for Cartoon Network and Max. It serves as a reinvention of Tiny Toon Adventures, and it follows five college students who enrolled at Acme Looniversity (or Acme Loo for short) to learn what it takes to be a toon.

Two seasons were ordered to be produced by Amblin Television and Warner Bros. Animation. The first season was released on September 8, 2023, on Max, followed by a televised premiere on Cartoon Network on September 9. The first half of the second season was released on March 8, 2024, along with a Spring Break special, which both premiered on Cartoon Network from April 6. A Winter special was released on December 6, 2024. The second half was released on March 22, 2025, alongside a Halloween special.

== Premise ==
Twins Buster and Babs Bunny pursue their comedic dreams to Acme Looniversity, a school for cartooning where young hopefuls become pros. There, they bond with Hamton J. Pig, Sweetie Bird, and Plucky Duck, and perfect their cartoony craft under the tutelage of the Looney Tunes legends.

== Voice cast ==
- Eric Bauza as:
  - Buster Bunny
  - Daffy Duck
  - Gossamer
  - Marvin the Martian
  - Elmer Fudd
  - Tweety Bird
- Ashleigh Crystal Hairston as Babs Bunny
- David Errigo Jr. as:
  - Plucky Duck
  - Hamton J. Pig
- Tessa Netting as:
  - Sweetie Bird
  - Li'l Sneezer
- Jeff Bergman as:
  - Bugs Bunny
  - Sylvester
  - Foghorn Leghorn
- Bob Bergen as Porky Pig
- Candi Milo as:
  - Dean Granny
  - Witch Hazel
  - Montana Max
  - Suzie Bird
- Fred Tatasciore as:
  - Taz
  - Yosemite Sam
  - Michigan J. Frog
  - Cool Cat
- Marieve Herington as Fifi La Fume
- Cree Summer as Elmyra Duff
- Natalie Palamides as:
  - Shirley the Loon
  - Furrball
  - Sabita Bird
- Betsy Sodaro as Dizzy Devil
- Kari Wahlgren as:
  - Lola Bunny
  - B'Shara Bunny
- Paul Julian as Little Beeper and Road Runner (archive recordings, uncredited)
- JP Karliak as Merlin the Magic Mouse
- Laraine Newman as Joan Shwinefeld
- Tony Rodriguez as Renaldo Raccoon

== Episodes ==
=== Series overview ===
Season	Episodes	Originally released	
Season	Episodes	First released	Last released
1	10	September 8, 2023	
2	10	March 8, 2024	March 22, 2025
Specials		March 8, 2024	March 22, 2025

=== Season 1 (2023) ===
No. overall	No. in season	Title	Directed by	Written by	Original release date	Cartoon Network airdate	Prod. code	U.S. viewers (millions)
1	1	"Freshman Orientoontion"	Andrew Dickman	Erin Gibson	September 8, 2023	September 9, 2023	TINY_921	0.13
Fraternal twins Buster and Babs arrive at ACME Loo and make friends with Sweetie Bird, Hamton, Plucky and among many others, reminding them living separately is not such a big deal.
2	2	"Give Pizza a Chance"	Lauren Andrews	Colleen Evanson	September 8, 2023	September 9, 2023	TINY_922	0.11
Buster and Plucky celebrate their new friendship with a pizza party, but their competitiveness threatens to ruin it. Meanwhile, Babs and Sweetie have their first fight when their hygienic standards clash. Finally, Hamton who has been the peacemaker between Buster and Plucky feels useless after both of them have no conflict to resolve anymore.
3	3	"Extra, So Extra"	Traci Honda	Benjamin Siemon	September 8, 2023	September 16, 2023	TINY_923	0.10
Babs plans to revive the school newspaper with wonderful stories of the ACME Loo students with Sweetie as her assistant, but not before exposing the source of toon scandals in the one published by Plucky. Meanwhile, Buster is excited to be chosen as a mentee to a Looney Tune character whom he assumes is Bugs, but turns out to be Merlin the Magic Mouse. Finally, Hamton who is trusted by everyone to keep their darkest secrets, has one of his own.
4	4	"Tooney Ball Lights"	Andrew Dickman	Joan Ford	September 8, 2023	September 23, 2023	TINY_924	0.13
The group face different struggles in their elective courses, in which Buster learns the importance of having fun in the sports game he long admired from Foghorn Leghorn. Sweetie joined Buster in the same elective after hearing from the latter how it suits her liking. Babs and Plucky chose the same elective because both of them thought it's easy to ace it. Finally, Hamton has a hard time figuring which one to choose.
5	5	"Save the Loo Bru"	Lauren Andrews	Phillip Walker	September 8, 2023	September 30, 2023	TINY_925	0.11
Buster, Plucky and Hamton decided to put their disguise knowledge from Bugs Bunny in application to save Dizzy Devil's shop from the newly admitted rival Montana Max, and prevent Dizzy's further destructions to the room of Babs and Sweetie.
6	6	"Prank You Very Much"	Traci Honda	Story by : Colleen Evanson; Teleplay by : Alison Becker & Colleen Evanson	September 8, 2023	October 7, 2023	TINY_926	0.23
ACME Loo has its friendly rivalry with Aqua Loo in a prank war and the group soon learns value of teamwork and key to surprises.
7	7	"General HOGspital"	Andrew Dickman	Erin Gibson	September 8, 2023 (Note: This episode was uploaded on YouTube on September 7, 2023. However, it was later privated.)	October 14, 2023	TINY_927	0.22
Hamton gets accepted into a toon medical school so can presume his doctor dream, despite it is not what he hoped for. Meanwhile, Buster could not get over with losing his best roommate, and Wile E. Coyote caused an epidemic in ACME Loo with a new biological weapon.
8	8	"Soufflé, Girl Hey"	Traci Honda	Benjamin Siemon	September 8, 2023	October 21, 2023	TINY_929	0.11
Babs and Buster are excited to get college jobs to earn some home money, but can they stand the heat cooking for the school chef Lola Bunny? Granny decides to put Plucky and Hamton in charge of showing Cool Cat around the ACME Loo campus. Unexpectedly, they have to secure the school reputation under new standards.
9	9	"Tears of a Clone"	Megan Fisher	Joan Ford	September 8, 2023	October 28, 2023	TINY_930	0.17
Through a machine from Wile E.'s yard sale, Buster makes a clone of himself to have fun with but the clone soon goes out of control after not de-cloned in time. Meanwhile, Babs and Sweetie open a clothing store with a time machine bought, but accidentally brings things from the past to the present that alters the future for the worst.
10	10	"The Show Must Hop On"	Lauren Andrews	Benjamin Siemon	September 8, 2023	November 4, 2023	TINY_931	0.12
The play for Wabbit Season (that celebrates the start of the Looney Tunes) is coming and Babs offers to direct it. She soon realizes that being a director is a lot harder that she thought, especially with the groundbreaking roles she gives to the toons and not sharing her vision with her friends.

=== Season 2 (2024–25) ===
No. overall	No. in season	Title	Directed by	Written by	Original release date	Cartoon Network airdate	Prod. code	U.S. viewers (millions)
11	1	"Whatever Happened to Babsy Bunny?"	Rose Feduk	Phillip Walker	March 8, 2024	April 13, 2024	TINY_932	0.15
Elmyra Duff kidnaps Babs to take pictures for her animal calendars when the latter and her friends are exploring the city.
12	2	"Slay Cheese"	Rose Feduk	Story by : Alison Becker; Teleplay by : Marva Ann Whitaker	March 8, 2024	April 20, 2024	TINY_742	0.10
Picture day has arrived and the Tiny Toons are prepared for their pictures to be taken, except for the Bunny twins and Hamton who's worried as usual.
13	3	"Tooned in Space"	Megan Fisher	Story by : Marva Ann Whitaker; Teleplay by : Jordan Morris	March 8, 2024	April 27, 2024	TINY_743	0.09
Babs is homesick so the boys and Sweetie (who's hooked on her game console) take her to Marvin the Martian's ship.
14	4	"Twin-Con"	Lauren Andrews	Jeannete Lim	March 8, 2024	May 4, 2024	TINY_744	0.05
Buster and Babs are asked to participate in the Twin-Con events and both were excited but soon discovered that it's not as fun as they thought. Meanwhile, Plucky posts Hamton for his online site of fame and the pig lets the fame get through his head so Sweetie is left keeping an eye on the roleplaying game they were enjoying halfway.
15	5	"Skulls and Sillybones"	Rose Feduk	Rebecca Hirschmann	March 8, 2024	May 31, 2025	TINY_745	N/A
Buster, Plucky and Hamton are invited to a secret society where they soon discover that it is not as interesting as they thought. Meanwhile, Babs and Sweetie weren't invited so they start their own society.
16	6	"Things That Go Tweet in the Woods"	Lauren Andrews	Joan Ford & Phillip Walker	March 22, 2025	June 7, 2025	TINY_928	N/A
During her trip in the woods with her friends, Sweetie admits that she saw something or someone in the forest during her childhood and had been afraid of it when she wondered who or what it might be.
17	7	"Ask Not What Bunnies Can Do for You"	Rose Feduk	Story by : Alison Becker; Teleplay by : Jordan Morris	March 22, 2025	June 14, 2025	TBA	N/A
The Bunny twin siblings compete for the school president but soon figured that their friendship for each other is more important than being in charge of something.
18	8	"Let Them Eat Quack"	Megan Fisher	Jeanette Lim & Marva Ann Whitaker	March 22, 2025	June 21, 2025	TBA	N/A
Plucky is somehow been made king of a land and starts exerts his ruling over his friends.
19	9	"Squash Me If You Can"	Lauren Andrews	Story by : Alison Becker & Erin Gibson; Teleplay by : Erin Gibson	March 22, 2025	June 28, 2025	TBA	N/A
Sweetie and Furrball compete in a bird vs. cat game. Meanwhile, Plucky fills in for Dizzy when the Tasmanian Devil gets exhausted from work.
20	10	"I Got a New Aptitude"	Rose Feduk	Rebecca Hirschmann	March 22, 2025	July 5, 2025	TBA	N/A
Buster, Plucky and Hamton have a test.

=== Specials (2024–25) ===
Title	Directed by	Written by	Original release date	Cartoon Network airdate	Prod. code	U.S. viewers (millions)
"Spring Beak"	Megan Fisher & Lauren Andrews	Story by : Erin Gibson; Teleplay by : Alison Becker & Erin Gibson	March 8, 2024	April 6, 2024	TINY_933; TINY_741	0.08
Spring Break has arrived and all the Tiny Toons are prepared to go back home with their families and have an epic week of relaxing. All except for the show's main characters, whose plans are unforeseeably changed from being regular to that of being challenging.
"Nightmare on Toon Street"	Megan Fisher & Lauren Andrews	Alison Becker & Erin Gibson	March 22, 2025	October 18, 2025	TBA	N/A
In the effort to not scare Babs and Hamton, Sweety competes in a contest to win a night in a Fall cabin. Upon arrival, the gang learns that it was a haunted cabin, freaking them out. Hamton accidentally learns that the whole thing was a scam due to Montana Max. When a ghost follows them back to school, the gang has to deal with it themselves.
"Winter Blunderland"	Megan Fisher & Lauren Andrews	Alison Becker & Erin Gibson	December 6, 2024	December 6, 2025	TINY_752; TINY_753	N/A
Buster has a gift: Luckiness, which curses him with misfortune and starts a chain reaction that makes the university lose its funds. Now the gang have to find the lost treasure to save the school before it closes permanently, oblivious that Elmer Fudd is also after it in order for him to get revenge against the school and the original owner of the treasure itself.

== Production ==
=== Development ===
Tiny Toons Looniversity was announced on October 28, 2020, through the Amblin Entertainment website. It was ordered for two seasons, with each episode running 30 minutes. As with the original series, it was announced that Steven Spielberg will return to his role as executive producer. Sam Register, Darryl Frank, and Justin Falvey will also be serving as executive producers, while Erin Gibson will be the showrunner and co-executive producer. The series was set to premiere on HBO Max, and simulcast on Cartoon Network in September 8, 2023.

The reboot's first piece of concept art showed Buster Bunny and Babs Bunny, redesigned with different clothes and a new art style.

Tom Ascheim, then-current president of Cartoon Network, was quoted saying. "Tiny Toons Looniversity will capture all the clever, subversive and smart humor that made Tiny Toon Adventures such a standout series. Fans old and new will love to laugh at and with these characters all over again."

Shortly after the reboot's announcement, it was reported that several of the original voice actors were not going to be involved in the series. Cree Summer had revealed she was informed that Elmyra Duff was excluded. Additionally, Charlie Adler was not approached to reprise his role as Buster along with John Kassir, nor was Maurice LaMarche as Dizzy Devil. It would eventually be revealed that Summer would be reprising her role when the full cast was announced in June 2023.

During an interview on July 12, 2021, Candi Milo said she would be returning to voice Granny but did not reprise her role as Sweetie Bird, which instead went to Tessa Netting. A few days later, on July 15, Jeff Bergman confirmed that he would be returning to the series as well, voicing Bugs Bunny, Sylvester and Foghorn Leghorn. He went into detail on the characters' roles in the series, explaining Foghorn would occupy as Acme Looniversity's coach, while Bugs would take on a "Dumbledore-like" personality. He also confirmed recording sessions had begun.

On July 9, 2022, it was announced that Tiny Toons Looniversity would be part of the Looney Tunes panel at San Diego Comic-Con 2022. On July 22, it was revealed that Ashleigh Crystal Hairston would be voicing Babs instead of Tress MacNeille. Numerous pieces of concept art were shown, revealing a revamped Acme Looniversity and its interiors. This also confirmed many of the original series' major characters would be returning, some with updated appearances. Most notably, Elmyra was included in one of these pictures, disproving the claims of her removal. Some have suggested this meant Elmyra was added back at some point or was always intended to appear, but will be recast with a different voice actress, instead of Summer. Spielberg referred to the series as "the best iteration of Tiny Toons he'd ever seen".

Showrunner Erin Gibson and character design supervisor Leonard Lee confirmed that Buster and Babs would be presented as twin siblings in the reboot, as opposed to best friends. This decision was criticized by fans of the original series. A July 2022 interview had crew members giving more details. They revealed the series was going to bring back all of the characters from the original show, "down to Arnold the Pit Bull". They also hinted at an episode which takes place in outer space. Gibson provided an explanation behind the choice to make Buster and Babs related, saying, "They're fraternal twins, which was not an original plot point. I wanted to dive into a brother/sister relationship that looked really symbiotic and collaborative and supportive, not antagonistic. Seeing two people who are really on the same page, and then how do people who are so close make new friends? You know, find out who they are by these new relationships — these new college experiences while still having fun and doing the dumbest stuff you'll ever see on TV, but having story and plot points and character development." Showrunner Nate Cash added, "And they look up to the faculty, they're established Tunes who are like their gods, but then they're like, 'Who am I?' and 'What's my voice?' — which is a cool place to develop them as their own characters and not just mini versions of their counterparts."

In an interview with The New York Times, Nate Cash said that Spielberg had set a high bar for the series. Although he primarily intended for children 6 to 11 to watch the series, he also hoped that the series would appeal "to their parents, or just adults who grew up on the original show that are looking for a nostalgia fix".

== Release ==
The series premiered on Max, on September 8, 2023 and simulcast on Cartoon Network the next day. It debuted in the United Kingdom and Ireland via Boomerang on April 15, 2024. In Central and Eastern Europe, it aired starting from April 29, 2024, on Cartoon Network and was put on streaming two days before on HBO Max.

== Reception ==
The show has received mixed reception. Jesse Hassenger of IGN ranked the series 6/10, writing that the series "has plenty of laughs, clever in-jokes, and endearing characters". However, he criticized the series for it being an average revival of a childhood series, "rather than something as concise and fresh as the all-ages Tiny Toon Adventures that inspired the original". Nick Valdez of ComicBook.com gave the series a 3.5/5, writing that "there's new life breathed into this franchise with Tiny Toons Looniversity, but it never loses that nostalgic allure" and due to the retcon change for Buster and Babs being siblings instead of couples.
