= Erin Gibson =

American actress

- Occupations: Showrunner; writer; actress
- Known for: Throwing Shade; Gay of Thrones
- Website: Erin Gibson

Erin Gibson is an American television showrunner, writer and actress. She co-created and hosts the podcast Throwing Shade and she created the Funny or Die production “Gay of Thrones” with Jonathan Van Ness. She has been nominated for three Primetime Emmys for Outstanding Short Form Variety Series.

She wrote a book of essays called "Feminasty: The Complicated Woman's Guide to Surviving the Patriarchy Without Drinking Herself to Death"

She was the showrunner of Tiny Toons Looniversity on Cartoon Network and currently serves as one for The Chicken Sisters on Hallmark+.

== Career ==
She began her career performing at Second City in Chicago and the Upright Citizens Brigade in Los Angeles. She also regularly contributed to HuffPost, from 2012 to 2017.

In 2011, she co-created the podcast Throwing Shade with Bryan Safi. In 2013, the podcast became a Funny or Die web series and stage show. In 2013, she also created the Funny or Die production Gay of Thrones with Jonathan Van Ness, her real hairstylist at the time who she overheard talking about the show and pitched them the idea.

Throwing Shade was adapted into a TV series and on January 17, 2017 the first episode of ten was released on TV Land. It was canceled after one season. The podcast version of Throwing Shade continued after the TV cancelation and was renamed Attitudes! in 2020.

In 2018, she released a book of essays entitled "Feminasty: The Complicated Woman's Guide to Surviving the Patriarchy Without Drinking Herself to Death".

In October 2020, it was announced the Gibson would serve as showrunner of the Tiny Toon Adventures reboot at HBO Max, called Tiny Toons Looniversity. The show was a Warner Bros, Amblin co-production and got a two-season pick up order.

On September 8, 2023, all 10 episodes of the first season were released on Max, and the first episode premiered on Cartoon Network the next day.

In 2025, Erin Gibson became the showrunner and executive producer of The Chicken Sisters for the second season after being on the writing staff in the first season.

== Nominations ==
- 2016 Nominated for Primetime Emmy Award for Outstanding Short Form Variety Series for Gay of Thrones
- 2018 Nominated for Primetime Emmy Award for Outstanding Short Form Variety Series for Gay of Thrones
- 2019 Nominated for Primetime Emmy Award for Outstanding Short Form Variety Series for Gay of Thrones
