= Jamie Denbo =

American actress

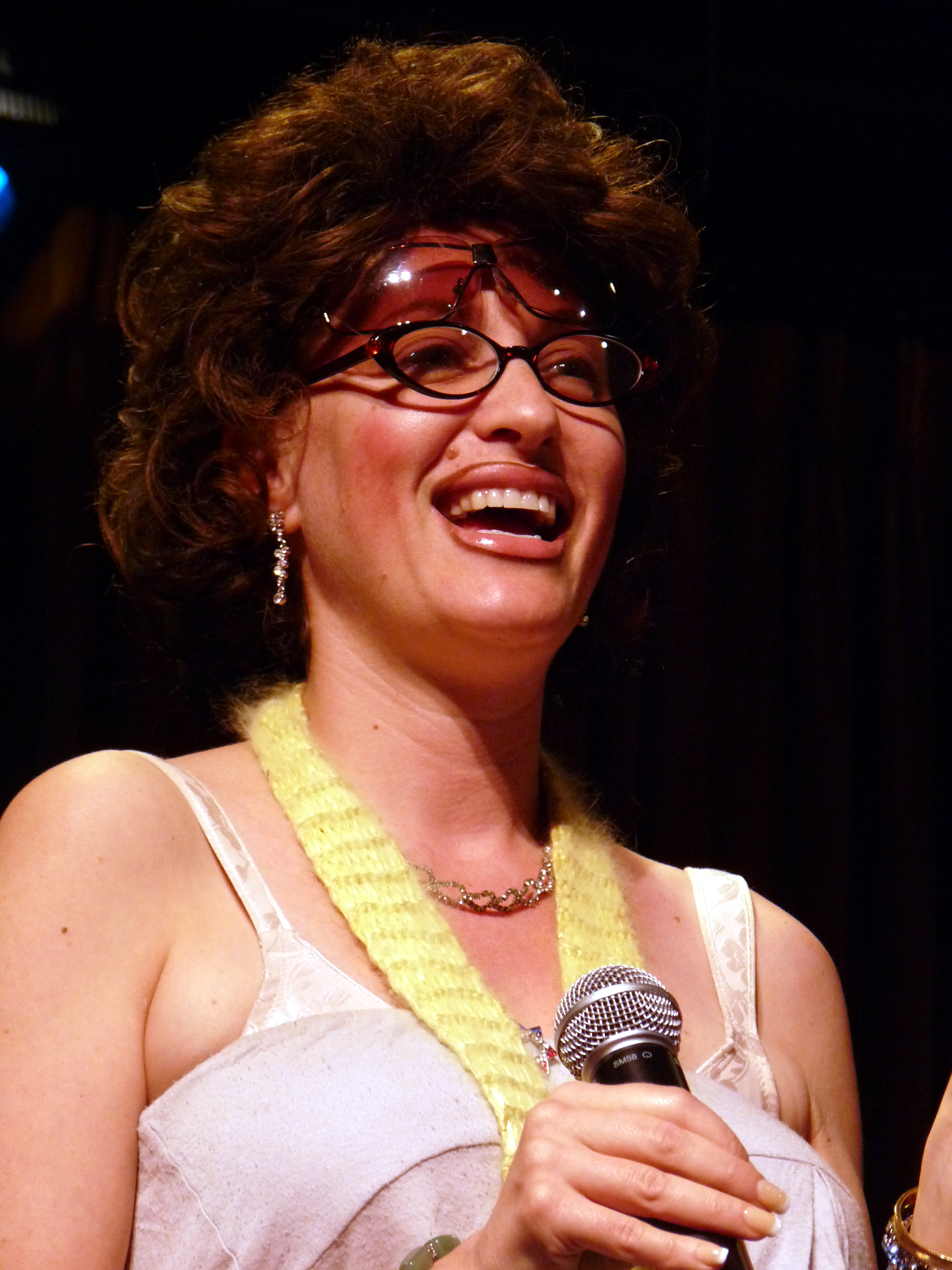
- Denbo as Beverly in 2009
- Born: Boston, Massachusetts, U.S.
- Occupations: Actress, comedian, writer
- Years active: 1997–present
- Spouse: John Ross Bowie (m. 2004)

Jamie Denbo is an American actress, writer, comedian and half of the comedy duo Ronna and Beverly with Jessica Chaffin. She also co-starred in the FX series Terriers and appeared in Spy, The Heat and Ghostbusters (2016).

== Early life ==
Denbo was born and raised in suburban Boston, in Swampscott, Massachusetts. She is an only child. Her mother is from Montreal, and her father is from New Jersey near Philadelphia; both parents were raised in Orthodox Jewish households. Denbo attended a Jewish day school from kindergarten to sixth grade.

Denbo attended college at Boston University, where she participated in improvisational comedy.

== Career ==
Early in her career, Denbo performed comedy at the Comedy Warehouse at Disney World's Pleasure Island in Orlando, Florida. She eventually moved to New York City where she began performing at the Upright Citizens Brigade Theater (UCB), where she continues to perform, now at the UCB's Los Angeles division, often performing with her husband John Ross Bowie and her comedy partner Jessica Chaffin. She also teaches classes there. She performed stand-up comedy for Just For Laughs in Montreal and Aspen Comedy Festival. She and Chaffin were slated to star in a comedy film after their success as supporting characters in the comedy feature The Heat.

Denbo was one of the stars of the sitcom Happy Hour, playing the role of Tina Difabio. She also played Susan Jones on the Goodnight Burbank video podcast. On August 5, 2007, she returned as co-anchor on the show. Her pilot Ronna & Beverly (based on the popular stage show she performs with Jessica Chaffin at the UCB) aired as a comedy special on the Showtime network in December 2009. In 2011, Denbo and Chaffin started the Ronna and Beverly comedy podcast where they interview different celebrities each week.

In 2010, she co-starred as Maggie Lefferts on the FX series Terriers. She has frequently appeared in comedy segments on The Late Late Show with Craig Ferguson. She has made guest appearances on Curb Your Enthusiasm, Happy Endings, The Life & Times of Tim, Reno 911!, Suburgatory, Bad Judge, Mike & Molly, Weeds, How I Met Your Mother, Mighty Med, Mulaney, Speechless and The Real O'Neals.

In December 2011, Denbo and Kerri Kenney-Silver made a pilot for Comedy Central called Dame Delilah’s Rabbit Hole Ranch based on a web-series they previously created and starred in. Her screenplay for Best Buds was sold to Vendome Pictures in 2010 with Natalie Portman attached to produce and star. Denbo is also a contributing writer for The Huffington Post.

She is the creator of Lifetime's American Princess which was cancelled after only one season, and the host of Stitcher podcast Beverly in LA.

== Podcasts ==
=== Ronna and Beverly ===
Denbo and comedy partner Jessica Chaffin hosted a podcast, Ronna and Beverly, on the Earwolf network from 2011 until 2017 wherein they interviewed celebrity guests, interacted with one another, and dispensed advice to listeners. Chaffin and Denbo developed their characters in 2006 when they were asked to host an all-Jewish 'Kosher Christmas Show' at the Upright Citizens Brigade Theatre.

Live performances from the pair were frequently advertised as "seminars" in which their characters discuss the fictional book they co-authored, "You'll Do a Little Better Next Time: A Guide to Marriage and Re-marriage for Jewish Singles." After introducing the book, either Chaffin or Denbo would often add the clarification, "It says Jewish in the name, but it's for everyone!"

Episodes of their eponymous podcast were released every two weeks by Earwolf. Guests included people working in comedy, as well as actors, authors, and filmmakers. The podcast premiered on May 25, 2011. In episode 161 on June 15, 2017 (not long after they started teasing the possibility of releasing weekly episodes), Ronna and Beverly suddenly announced they were taking off "for the summer." Since then, no new episodes have been released and the actresses have not appeared together in character. Jessica Chaffin has kept Ronna alive by appearing in character as a guest on other podcasts and by maintaining an Instagram account. On the April 16, 2018, episode of the Why Mommy Drinks podcast, guest Jamie Denbo confirmed that she "used to" have a podcast called Ronna and Beverly, ostensibly indicating the conclusion of the series.

Denbo's daughter appeared on several episodes of the podcast as "Spaghettios." "Spaghettios" is the troubled 8-year-old daughter of Beverly's neighbor, Gloria "Spaghetti", whose actual last name Beverly cannot remember, but knows it's "something Italian."

On March 11, 2019, Denbo announced she will be launching a spinoff podcast titled Beverly In LA on Stitcher Premium.

== Personal life ==
Denbo married comedy writer and actor John Ross Bowie in 2004.

== Filmography ==
Film
Year	Title	Role	Notes
1997	Last Night at Eddie's	Allison	
2004	Blackballed: The Bobby Dukes Story	Jill Watson	
2005	Must Love Dogs	Bertha	
2009	Ronna & Beverly	Beverly Kahn-Ginsberg	TV movie
2013	The Heat	Beth	
2013	Dark Minions	Carly	TV movie
2015	Spy	Casino Hostess	
2015	Daddy's Home	Doris	
2016	Get a Job	Sam's Mom	
2016	Ghostbusters	Waitress	

Television
Year	Title	Role	Notes
2008	The Mighty B!		episode 4: writer: "Little Orphan Happy"
2010	Terriers	Maggie Lefferts	13 episodes
2011	How I Met Your Mother	Sheila	Episode: "Field Trip"
2011	Happy Endings	Gita	Episode: "Grinches Be Crazy"
2011	Childrens Hospital	Herself	Episode: "Nip/Tug"
2013	Brooklyn Nine-Nine	Hillary	Episode: "Christmas"
2013	Parks and Recreation	Kim Terlando	Episode: "Correspondents' Lunch"
2013	Family Guy		S12E5: "Boopa-dee Bappa-dee"
2013	Wendell & Vinnie	Cammie	Episode 17: "Of Mothers & Gardens"
2012–13	Comedy Bang! Bang!	Maura Isles / Cindy Linderman	Episode 6: "Paul Rudd Wears a Red Lumberjack Flannel Shirt"; 17: "Andy Richter Wears a Suit Jacket & a Baby Blue Button Down Shirt"
2013	Sam & Cat	Sharon	Episode 5: "#TextingCompetition"
2014	Mulaney	Sharisse	Episode 7: "Motif & the City"
2014	Mystery Girls	Rose Brack	Episode: "Death Rose"
2014	The Hotwives of Orlando	Whör Store Employee	Episode: "Pimps and Hoo-Ha's"
2014	Chasing Life	Psychic	S1E5: "The Family That Lies Together"
2014	Hot in Cleveland	Julie	S5E11: "Undercover Lovers"
2014	Bulimia: The Musical	Mother	Short
2014	Just for Laughs: All-Access	Beverly	Episode: "Bobby Moynihan & Taran Killam"
2014	Trophy Wife	Iris	Episode: "The Minutes"
2014	About a Boy	Fiona's Female Boss	Episode: "About a Buble"
2014	The Crazy Ones	Katherine	Episode: "March Madness"
2014	Kroll Show	Dana Hawke / Reporter	"Bounce" "Oh Armond"
2015	Bad Judge	Carla Myers	Episode: "Case Closed"
2014–15	Girlfriends' Guide to Divorce	Cleo Stevens	Rule #33: "When in Doubt, Run Away"; Rule #21: "Leave Childishness to the Children"
2015	Grandfathered	Aida	
2015	Mighty Med	Bridget	
2016	Born Again Virgin		1 episode
2016	The Real O'Neals	Sam	
2016	Glued	Sara	
2016	Sofia the First	Queen Everly / Sassofras	2 episodes
2016	Serious Music	Pamela	"Parody Vs. Plagiarism" "Kiss the Rings"
2016	Those Who Can't	Kathleen Donovan	
2016	Mike & Molly	Officer Stoltz	Episode: "Cops on the Rocks"
2016	Difficult People	Rizzo	Episode: "Italian Pinata"
2016	The Good Place	Chef Patricia	Episode: "Jason Mendoza"
2014–17	Orange is the New Black	Shelly Ginsberg	7 episodes
2017	Return of the Mac	Sam Kandor	8 episodes
2017	Crazy Ex-Girlfriend	Podcast Host	Episode: "Who Is Josh's Soup Fairy?"
2017	Speechless	Janet	Episode: "H-E-R-- HERO"
2017	Wrecked	Greta Liebowitz	Episode: "Poison"
2017	Wet Hot American Summer: Ten Years Later	Bickering Wife	Episode 3: "Tigerclaw"
2017	I'm Sorry	Caroline	Episode: "Butt Bumpers"
2018	Swedish Dicks	Jamie Dunn	Episode: "Dawn of the Dicks"
2018	GLOW	Detective Gold	Episode: "Concerned Women of America"
2018	F Is for Family	Marie (voice)	7 episodes
2019	American Princess		2 episodes; also creator, writer, executive producer
2019	Bajillion Dollar Propertie$	Beverly	Episode: "Missing Dean"
2021	Rebel	writer	Episode #3: "Superhero"
2021	Kevin Can F**k Himself	Diane McAntee	10 episodes
