= Steve Bannos =

American actor and writer

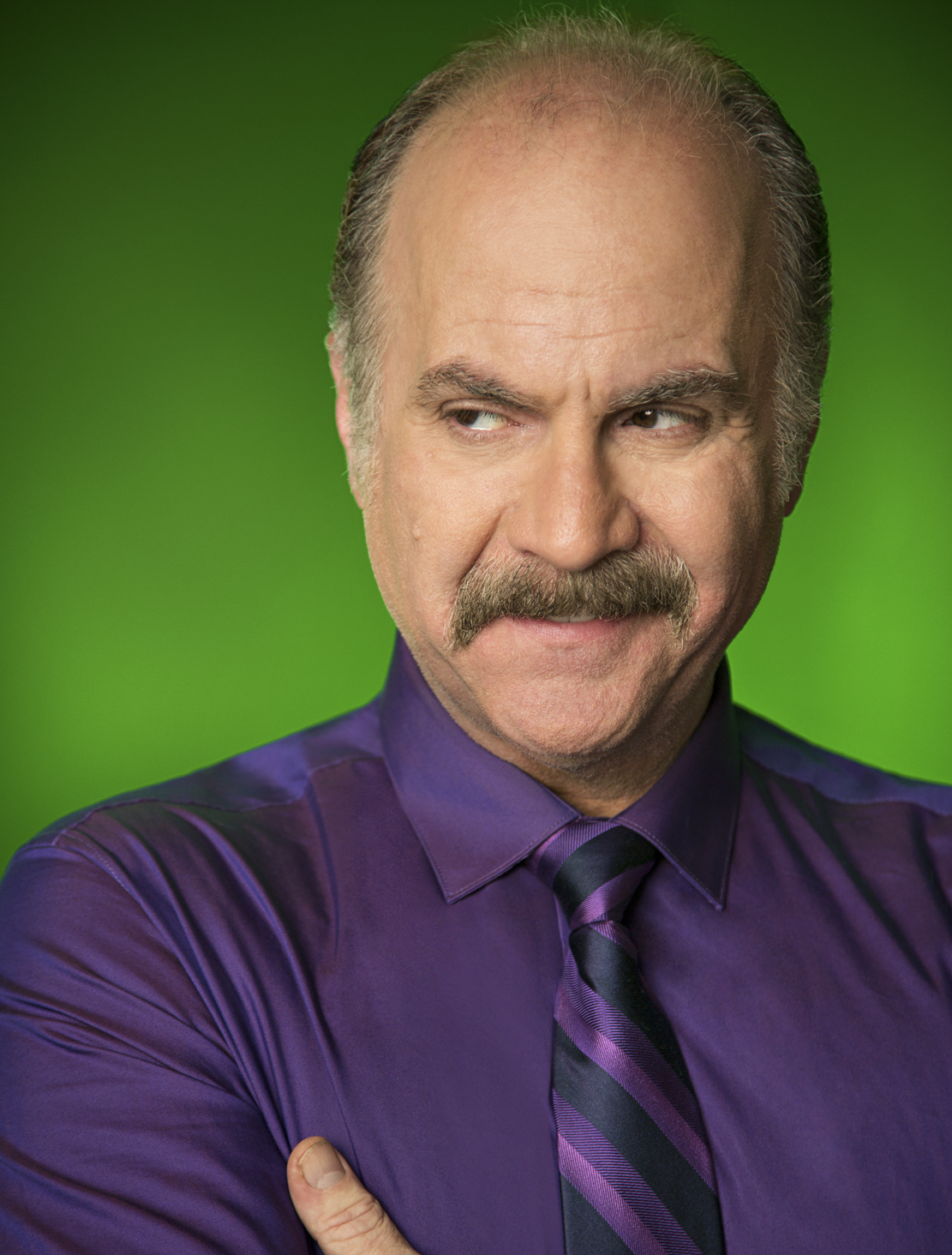
- Steve Bannos in 2013
- Occupations: Actor; writer; photo dealer
- Years active: 1992–present

Steve Bannos is an American television and film actor, writer and photo dealer. As an actor, he often had cameos in Judd Apatow and Paul Feig films.

He is also known for his portrayal of Frank Kowchevski on the short-lived NBC dramedy Freaks and Geeks.

== Career ==
Bannos appeared in the films Spy, The Heat, Bridesmaids, Funny People, Superbad, The 40-Year-Old Virgin, Drillbit Taylor, Pineapple Express, and Unaccompanied Minors; and TV appearances in Love, Mike & Molly, Days of Our Lives, Eagleheart, The Mentalist and Without a Trace. Bannos also played the characters "Mr. Combover" and "Mr. Gross" on the Nickelodeon TV show, Ned's Declassified School Survival Guide.

Bannos also wrote for Freaks and Geeks, Disney's Recess, the Nicktoon Doug and was a four-time guest writer on Saturday Night Live.

== Filmography ==
=== Film ===
Year	Title	Role	Notes
1997	Life Sold Separately	Larry	
2004	Wake Up, Ron Burgundy: The Lost Movie	Nikos	
2005	The 40-Year-Old Virgin	Father at Restaurant	
2006	Unaccompanied Minors	Tree Salesman	
2007	Superbad	Math Teacher	
2007	Shiloh Falls	Jamison	
2007	Walk Hard: The Dewey Cox Story	Prison Guard	
2007	Cinematic Titanic: The Oozing Skull	Al Hirt	
2008	Semi-Pro	Cop at Jail	
2008	Drillbit Taylor	Coffee Computer Guy	
2008	Pineapple Express	Jared - Thug #2	
2009	Cryptic	Damon's Dad	
2009	Funny People	Deli Manager	
2011	Bridesmaids	Annie's Mistaken Husband	
2013	The Heat	Wayne	
2014	Alexander and the Terrible, Horrible, No Good, Very Bad Day	Security Guard	
2015	Don Quixote	The Innkeeper	
2015	Spy	Alan the Bartender	
2016	Ghostbusters	Flasher Ghost	
2016	Why Him?	Tree Lot Owner Burt	
2017	Actors Anonymous	Marco	
2022	Blonde	Brentwood Doctor	

=== Television ===
Year	Title	Role	Notes
1994	Honor Thy Father and Mother: The True Story of the Menendez Murders	Det. Tim Linehan	Television film
1995	The TV Wheel	Various	Television film
1997	Sabrina the Teenage Witch	Judge #1	Episode: "Trial by Fury"
1999–2000	Freaks and Geeks	Frank Kowchevski	12 episodes; also writer
2001	Undeclared	Dingleberry	Episode: "Rush and Pledge"
2003	Life on Parole	Hamburger Joint Manager	Television film
2004–2007	Ned's Declassified School Survival Guide	Mr. Combover / Mr. Gross	12 episodes
2005	Arrested Development	Drill Sergeant	Episode: "Switch Hitter"
2006–2007	Help Me Help You	Dave's Boss	3 episodes
2007	The Naked Trucker and T-Bones Show	Antagonistic Driver	Episode: "Gold Watch"
2009	Without a Trace	Barkeep	Episode: "Labyrinths"
2011	Super Scary Horror Theater	Tranny Sylvania	Episode: "House on Haunted Hill"
2011	The Mentalist	Bartender	Episode: "Like a Redheaded Stepchild"
2011	New Girl	Cab Driver	Episode: "Pilot"
2012	Eagleheart	Dr. Sinclair	Episode: "Beat Shack"
2012	Wave Goodbye	Gustavo	Episode: "Google the Government"
2014	Days of Our Lives	Mr. Molina	Episode #1.12258
2014	Mike & Molly	Petros	Episode: "Sex, Lies and Helicopters"
2016	Masters of Sex	Stavros	Episode: "Topeka"
2016–2018	Love	Frank	8 episodes
2017	American Horror Story: Cult	Policeman	Episode: "Valerie Solanas Died for Your Sins: Scumbag"
2017	Curb Your Enthusiasm	Sick Passenger	Episode: "The Accidental Text on Purpose"
2018	It's a Beach Thing	Captain Morgan	Episode: "Pilot"
2021	Station 19	Officer Garza	Episode: "Learning to Fly"
