= Jessica Chaffin =

American actress, comedian, writer and podcaster (born 1974)

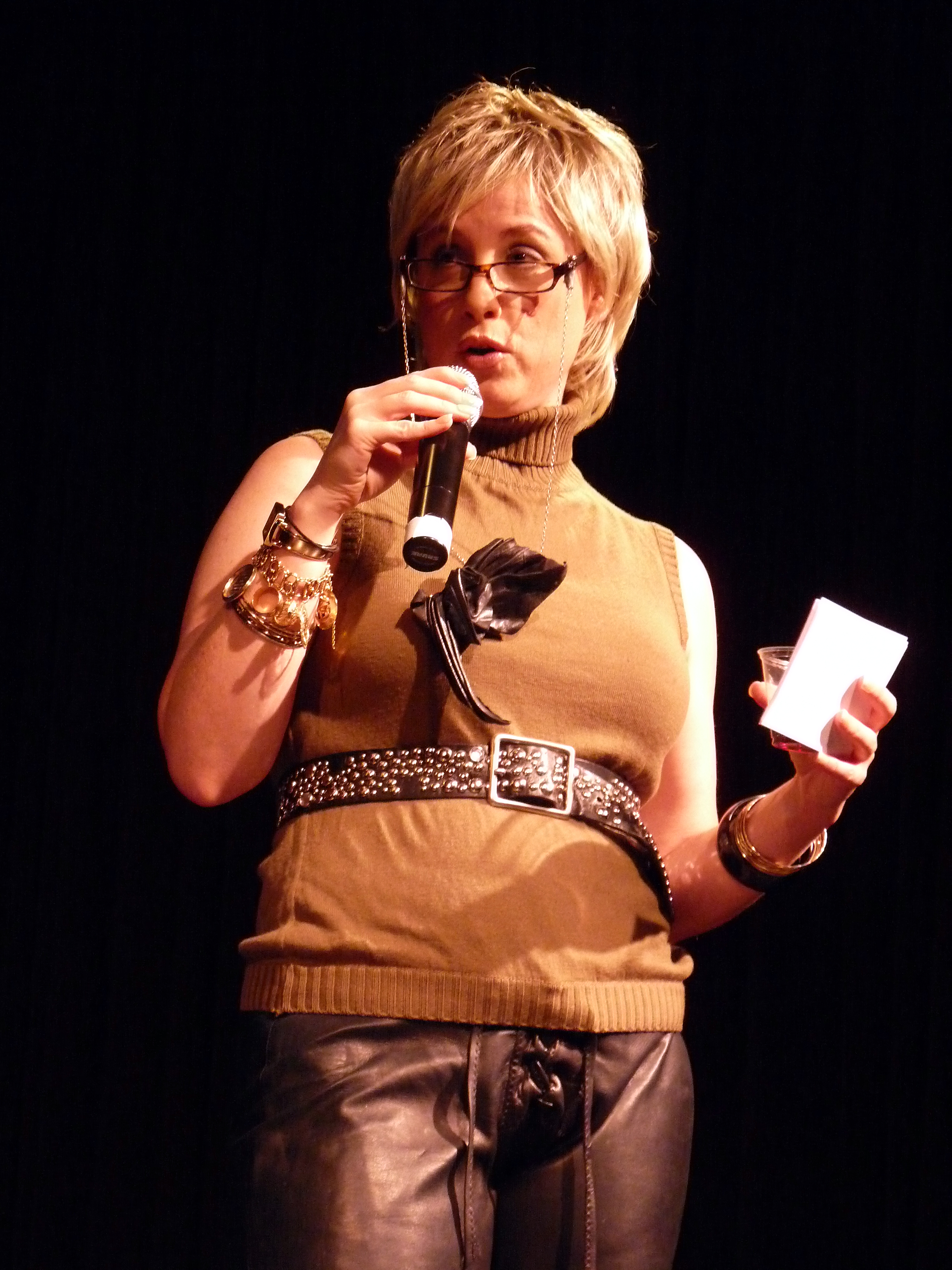
- Chaffin as Ronna in 2009
- Born: January 5, 1974 (age 52); Newton, Massachusetts, U.S.
- Occupations: Actress; comedian; writer; podcaster
- Years active: 1999–present
- Children: 1

Jessica Chaffin (born January 5, 1974) is an American actress, comedian, writer and podcaster best known as part of the comedy duo Ronna and Beverly with Jamie Denbo. She is also known for her recurring roles as Coco Wexler on Nickelodeon's Zoey 101, Marie Faldonado in the CBS sitcom Man with a Plan and appearing in the films Spy and The Heat. She starred as Beth in the NBC sitcom Abby's.

== Early life ==
Chaffin was born and raised in Newton, Massachusetts. Her father is from a Jewish family, and her mother, who is of Scottish and English ancestry, converted to Judaism; Chaffin was raised Jewish.

== Career ==
She is a regular performer at the Upright Citizens Brigade Theatre in Los Angeles, often performing with her comedy partner Jamie Denbo. From 2005 to 2008, Chaffin was known for playing Coco Wexler, the girls' dorm adviser on all four seasons of the Nickelodeon series Zoey 101. From 2008 to 2009, she also worked with Amy Poehler as a writer and voice actor on the animated series The Mighty B! playing several roles, including that of Portia's cousin, Chelsea. Then she popped up on various TV shows, including 90210, United States of Tara, New Girl, Man with a Plan, Veep, Episodes, and Search Party, and in the movies Spy, Pitch Perfect 3, and Fun Mom Dinner.

Chaffin has made guest appearances on television programs such as Weeds, Entourage, and Curb Your Enthusiasm. In December 2009, her comedy pilot Ronna & Beverly (based on the popular stage show she performs with Denbo at the Upright Citizens Brigade Theatre) aired on Showtime. Ronna & Beverly was eventually turned into a six-part comedy talk show, which was co-produced by Paul Feig and premiered on September 10, 2012, on Sky Atlantic HD in the United Kingdom. Together with Denbo, Chaffin created the Ronna and Beverly podcast. A follow-up podcast, Ask Ronna, with Chaffin co-hosting with Bryan Safi was launched in 2019.

Chaffin was a series regular on the first season of CBS sitcom Man With A Plan and starred in the NBC sitcom Abby's.

== Podcasts ==
=== Ronna and Beverly ===
Chaffin and comedy partner Jamie Denbo hosted a podcast, Ronna and Beverly, on the Earwolf network from 2011 until 2017 wherein they interviewed celebrity guests, interacted with one another, and dispensed advice to listeners. Chaffin and Denbo developed their characters in 2006 when they were asked to host an all-Jewish 'Kosher Christmas Show' at the Upright Citizens Brigade Theatre.

Live performances from the pair were frequently advertised as "seminars" in which their characters discuss the fictional book they co-authored, "You'll Do a Little Better Next Time: A Guide to Marriage and Re-marriage for Jewish Singles." After introducing the book, either Chaffin or Denbo would often add the clarification, "It says Jewish in the name, but it's for everyone!"

Episodes of their eponymous podcast were released every two weeks by Earwolf. Guests included people working in comedy, as well as actors, authors, and filmmakers. The podcast premiered on May 25, 2011. In episode 161 on June 15, 2017 (not long after they started teasing the possibility of releasing weekly episodes), Ronna and Beverly suddenly announced they were taking off "for the summer." Since then, no new episodes have been released and the actresses have not appeared together in character. Jessica Chaffin has kept Ronna alive by appearing in character as a guest on other podcasts and by maintaining an Instagram account.

=== Ask Ronna ===
In November, 2019, Chaffin and co-host Bryan Safi premiered a new podcast called Ask Ronna, in which Chaffin continues to appear as Ronna Glickman. Safi and Chaffin's show focuses on requests for advice and questions from listeners, and often feature a celebrity guest.

Chaffin, as Glickman, is a purveyor of artisanal coffees in conjunction with the Ask Ronna podcast.

== Filmography ==
Film
Year	Title	Role	Notes
2007	Wild Girls Gone	—N/a	
2008	Longwinded	Gal	Short film
2010	MA Men	Joan Harris	Video short
2010	MA Men 2	Joan Harris	Video short
2011	The Real Housewives of South Boston	Chaffin	Video short
2011	The Real Housewives of South Boston: Christmas Special	Chaffin	Video short
2013	The Heat	Gina	
2014	Girltrash: All Night Long	Officer Jackie	
2015	Hello, My Name Is Doris	DIY Kate	
2015	Spy	Sharon	
2016	Hickey	Barb	
2016	Ghostbusters	Waitress	
2017	Fun Mom Dinner	Jen	
2017	Pitch Perfect 3	Evan	
2020	Desperados	Debbie	

Television
Year	Title	Role	Notes
1999	The Amanda Show	The Dare Show Contestant, FBI Agent (segments)	
2000	Upright Citizens Brigade	Junkie Cheerleader	Episode: "Thunderball"
2002	All That	Security Guard	Episode: "Kenan Thompson/LFO"
2003	What I Like About You	Geena	Episode: "Loose Lips"
2005–08	Zoey 101	Coco Wexler	13 episodes
2005	Las Vegas	Maggie Stein	Episode: "One Nation, Under Surveillance"
2007	The Very Funny Show	Mike's Mother, various	2 episodes
2008	Weeds	Crackhead	2 episodes
2008	Entourage	Barbara's Assistant	Episode: "Seth Green Day"
2008	Held Up	Sharon	Television film
2008–09	The Mighty B!	Chelsea, Virginia, Passerby #2, Joey, Receptionist, Black Widow #1 (voices)	5 episodes
2009	Curb Your Enthusiasm	Hostess	Episode: "Funkhouser's Crazy Sister"
2009	Ronna & Beverly	Ronna Glickman	Television film
2009–10	90210	Ms. Geiser (Field Hockey Coach)	3 episodes
2010–11	United States of Tara	Mrs. Fox	4 episodes
2012	NTSF:SD:SUV::	Edith	Episode: "Sabbath-tage"
2012	Ronna & Beverly	Ronna	Comedy talk show
2012	2 Broke Girls	Druggie Girl	Episode: "And the Egg Special"
2012	Eugene!	Painted Lady	Television film
2013	Arrested Development	Junkie	2 episodes
2013	Comedy Bang! Bang!	Jane Rizzoli	Episode: "Andy Richter Wears a Suit Jacket & a Baby Blue Button Down Shirt"
2013	Ghost Ghirls	Jessica Clemens	Episode: "Ghost Writer"
2013	Childrens Hospital	Hypnotist	Episode: "Blaken"
2013	The League	Mrs. Shapiro	Episode: "The Automatic Faucet"
2013–14	New Girl	Bertie	4 episodes
2014	The Crazy Ones	Elaine	Episode: "March Madness"
2014	Sam & Cat	Coco Wexler	Episode: "#FirstClassProblems"
2014	Silicon Valley		Episode: "Optimal Tip-to-Tip Efficiency"
2014	The Hotwives of Orlando	Ruth	Episode: "Intervention Party"
2014–17	Episodes	Nina / Woman	5 episodes
2015	Other Space	General Hayson	Episode: "Into the Great Beyond... Beyond"
2015	Another Period	Pussy Von Anderstein	Episode: "Divorce"
2015	You're The Worst	Di	Episode: "A Right Proper Story"
2016	Mike & Molly	Allison	Episode: "Cops on the Rocks"
2016	Difficult People	Joanie	Episode: "Italian Piñata"
2016–17	Veep	Congresswoman Gellardi	5 episodes
2016–17	Man with a Plan	Marie Faldonado	11 episodes
2017	I'm Sorry	Nurse	Episode: "Pilot"
2017	Search Party	Crystal	4 episodes
2017–2025	Big Mouth	Shannon Glaser (voice)	16 episodes
2019	Abby's	Beth	Main cast; 10 episodes
2019	Bajillion Dollar Propertie$	Ronna	Episode: "Missing Dean"

Podcasts
Year	Title	Episode
2011–2017	Ronna & Beverly	164 episodes
2012	How Did This Get Made	Episode 33: Abduction
2013–14	The Dead Authors Podcast	Chapter 17: Agatha Christie; Chapter 37: Truman Capote
2014	The JV Club	Episode 140
2014	Totally Laime	Episode 236: Murder Car!
2015	Reading Aloud	Episode 13: (with Kevin Sussman and Robey Clark)
2015	Reading Aloud	Episode 32: Book Club 11: All the Light We Cannot See
2015	Womp It Up!	Episode 12: Spotlight On: Donna "Pep" Delpepio
2015	About Last Night	Episode 97
2015–16	Spontaneanation	Episode 8: A Superyacht
2015–16	Spontaneanation	Episode 20: Death Valley
2015–16	Spontaneanation	Episode 25: 10th Circle of Hell
2015–16	Spontaneanation	Episode 28: One Hour Photo Shop
2015–16	Spontaneanation	Episode 44: The One Beauty Parlor In A Small Town
2015–16	Spontaneanation	Episode 48: Laundromat
2016	Hard Nation	Episode 9: Megyn Kelly Is Inside the Boys Club
2016	Sklarbro Country	Episode 237
2016–17	Bitch Sesh: A Real Housewives Breakdown	Episode 15: Hearing Is Believing; Episode 25: All the Countess's Men; Episode 35: Body of Evidence (w/ Lindy Jamil Gomez); Episode 68: Reunion; Episode 85: Farm-to-Table Manners
2017	Throwing Shade	Episode 305, 301
2017	Hollywood Handbook	Episode 206
2017	Never Not Funny	Episode 19xf
2017	Next Level with Chris Tallman	Episode 8
2017	Lovett or Leave It	Episode 15
2017	Minor Revelations	Episode 43
2017	The Kibitz	Episode 19
2019	Throwing ShOscars	6 Episodes (as Ronna Glickman)
2019–present	Ask Ronna with Bryan Safi	(as Ronna Glickman)
2020	Throwing ShOscars	(as Ronna Glickman)

Writing
Year	Title	Medium	Notes
2003	Aerobic Striptease	Video documentary	
2008–09	The Mighty B!	TV	16 episodes
2010	90210	TV	Episode: "Meet the Parent"
