= The Heat (film) =

2013 American buddy cop action comedy film by Paul Feig

- Theatrical release poster
- Directed by: Paul Feig
- Written by: Katie Dippold
- Produced by: Peter Chernin; Jenno Topping
- Starring: Sandra Bullock; Melissa McCarthy; Demián Bichir; Marlon Wayans; Michael Rapaport
- Cinematography: Robert Yeoman
- Edited by: Brent White; Jay Deuby
- Music by: Michael Andrews
- Production companies: Chernin Entertainment; Ingenious Media; Big Screen Productions
- Distributed by: 20th Century Fox
- Release dates: June 23, 2013 (New York City); June 28, 2013 (United States)
- Running time: 117 minutes
- Country: United States
- Language: English
- Budget: $43 million
- Box office: $229.9 million

The Heat is a 2013 American action comedy film directed by Paul Feig and written by Katie Dippold. It stars Sandra Bullock and Melissa McCarthy, with Demián Bichir, Marlon Wayans, Michael Rapaport, and Jane Curtin in supporting roles. The film centers on FBI Special Agent Sarah Ashburn and Boston Detective Shannon Mullins, who must take down a mobster in Boston.

The film was released by 20th Century Fox in the United States on June 28, 2013. It received mixed to positive reviews from critics and was a success at the box office, grossing $229 million worldwide against a $43 million budget.

== Plot ==
FBI Special Agent Sarah Ashburn is an expert federal criminal investigator in New York City. Her supervisor, who is considering her for promotion, assigns her to a mission in Boston. She meets Boston Police Department Detective Shannon Mullins. Their professional styles clash during their attempt to interrogate a drug dealer as well as their personalities. Ashburn reluctantly agrees to work with Mullins. While Ashburn comes across as a level-headed professional, Mullins approaches every hassle in a hot-headed way with boorish manners which puts off Ashburn.

Ashburn and Mullins tail a nightclub manager to his business, Club Ekko, and place a bug on his phone to get information on drug lord Simon Larkin. Leaving the club, Ashburn and Mullins are confronted by DEA Special Agents Craig and Adam, who have been working the Larkin case for months. A surveillance video in the DEA agents' van shows that Mullins's brother Jason, whom Mullins had herself busted for drug-crimes and has recently been released from prison, appears to be connected to Larkin.

Ashburn convinces Mullins to visit her parents' home to ask Jason for information on Larkin. The family is angry with Mullins for arresting her brother, but Jason tips Mullins off about the body of a murdered drug dealer. Chemicals on the victim's shoes lead the women to an abandoned paint factory, where they witness a drug dealer being murdered by Julian Vincent, second-in-command of Larkin's organization. They apprehend Julian, but get no information on Larkin's whereabouts.

The women spend the evening bonding in a bar. A drunk Ashburn reveals that her history as a foster child is to blame for her bad attitude. The next morning Ashburn discovers that she has given her car away to a bar patron, but when he starts the car, it explodes.

Julian has escaped from custody and intends to harm Mullins' family, so she moves them into a motel. Jason tries to join the Larkin organization in order to help Mullins solve the case. He gives her a tip about a drug shipment coming in. Despite Mullins' reluctance, Ashburn calls in the FBI, which discovers that it is only a pleasure cruise ship.

Larkin shoots Jason for informing the FBI about the supposed drug shipment, and he is rendered comatose. Mullins and Ashburn fall out, with Mullins vowing to bring her brother's attacker to justice. They reconcile after arresting several drug dealers while trying to ascertain Larkin's whereabouts.

The women equip themselves with assault weapons from Mullins's personal arsenal, and infiltrate one of Larkin's warehouses, but are captured and bound. Julian is about to torture them when he gets called away by Larkin. Before leaving, Julian stabs Ashburn in the leg and leaves the knife in the wound.

Mullins removes the knife and uses it to cut the rope binding her hands. Before she can cut the rope around her feet, they hear someone coming, so she puts the knife back in Ashburn's leg. It is Craig and Adam who enter. Craig begins to untie the two women, but when they reveal Jason is alive, Adam shoots Craig before revealing he is Larkin. Adam/Larkin has been working on his own case from inside the DEA for months.

Julian returns and Larkin orders him to kill Ashburn and Mullins while he goes to the hospital to kill Jason. Mullins had put her arms behind her chair so she still looks tied up. After Larkin leaves, she frees herself, grabs the knife and attacks Julian. Ashburn throws herself to the floor whilst tied to her chair and he falls. Julian then grabs Ashburn and threatens to slit her throat as Mullins raises a gun. Ashburn head butts Julian backwards and incapacitates him. The duo race to the hospital to save Jason.

There, Mullins searches for Jason; Ashburn, hindered by her stab wound, lags behind. Mullins finds Jason's room, but is disarmed by Larkin, who is about to kill Jason. Ashburn, however, subdues him by shooting him in the genitals. Ashburn requests to stay in the FBI's Boston field office, as she has developed a strong friendship with Mullins.

Jason fully recovers from his coma. Mullins receives a commendation from the Boston Police Department, and members of her family are present, who all cheer for her. Mullins has signed the back of Ashburn's yearbook, "Foster kid, now you have a sister".

== Cast ==
- Sandra Bullock as Sarah Ashburn
- Melissa McCarthy as Shannon Mullins
- Demián Bichir as Hale
- Marlon Wayans as Levy
- Michael Rapaport as Jason Mullins
- Taran Killam as Special Agent Adam / Simon Larkin
- Dan Bakkedahl as Special Agent Craig Garrett
- Jane Curtin as Mrs. Mullins
- Michael B. Tucci as Mr. Mullins
- Joey McIntyre as Peter Mullins
- Bill Burr as Mark Mullins
- Nate Corddry as Michael Mullins
- Jessica Chaffin as Gina
- Jamie Denbo as Beth
- Michael McDonald as Julian Vincent
- Adam Ray as Hank LeSoire
- Spoken Reasons as Terrell Rojas
- Tom Wilson as Captain Woods
- Kaitlin Olson as Tatiana Krumova
- Tony Hale as The John
- Andy Buckley as Robin
- Ben Falcone as Blue-Collar Man
- John Ross Bowie as FBI Officer
- Chris Gethard as himself
- Steve Bannos as Wayne
- Mitch Silpa as Dealer
- Zach Woods as Paramedic
- Katie Dippold as ER Nurse
- Paul Feig as Doctor

== Production ==
The Heat is screenwriter Katie Dippold's feature film debut. Dippold wrote the spec script on the side while fulfilling writing duties on Parks and Recreation and, ultimately, it sold to producer Peter Chernin for $600,000 prior to even being presented to prospective bidders. Inspired by the buddy cop film genre, primarily examples such as Running Scared (1986) and Lethal Weapon (1987), Dippold set out to write a film in which the leads were portrayed by women. As Dippold explains: "[In] Running Scared, they go down to the Caribbean and there's this montage of them on scooters, and there's a different hot girl on the back every time it cuts back to the scooter. And it just felt like, I don't want to be the girl on the back of the scooter. I want to be the awesome cop doing this stuff."

Despite the success of Bridesmaids (2011), studio executives were still uncertain of an action film with a female-led cast. "There were people suspicious of this attempt, who thought girls won't want to see a cop action movie and guys won't want to see two girls holding guns and we'd cancel out our potential audience," said producer Jenno Topping. "But we really believed, at the end of the day, it wouldn't be about gender as much as it would be about delivering a courageous action comedy with some heart to it."

I don't like women acting like men; then it's not serving anybody. That's why The Heat was really important to me. Because I didn't want to do a romantic comedy. Even Bridesmaids had the romantic elements to it with the Chris O'Dowd relationship, which worked great. What I liked about this one was that it didn't have any of that. It's just two professional women in the workforce who are great at their jobs and who are on this adventure.

— Paul Feig, explaining what drew him to the film

On May 19, 2012, director Paul Feig and actresses Sandra Bullock and Melissa McCarthy signed on to the film, after previously struggling to close deals due to scheduling and payment conflicts. At this time, the film was called The Untitled Female Buddy Cop Comedy.

Principal photography for The Heat began on July 5, 2012, at then-Dudley Square (now Nubian Square) in Boston, Massachusetts.

=== Music ===
The soundtrack is composed by Michael Andrews who previously scored Feig's Bridesmaids and Unaccompanied Minors (2006). A soundtrack album containing songs featured in the film was released on June 25, 2013, by Lakeshore Records. Of these songs, the album includes a brand new track entitled "Rock This" by Santigold. Describing why he chose the songs featured in the film, Feig said: "My favorite part of filmmaking is finding the perfect music to complement what's happening on screen. And I wanted The Heat to feel like a party. I wanted the audience to have fun. And since I have to watch a movie hundreds of times as I'm making it, I wanted to use music that I wouldn't get tired of. Every song in this film is a desert island song for me. I will never get sick of them."

== Release ==
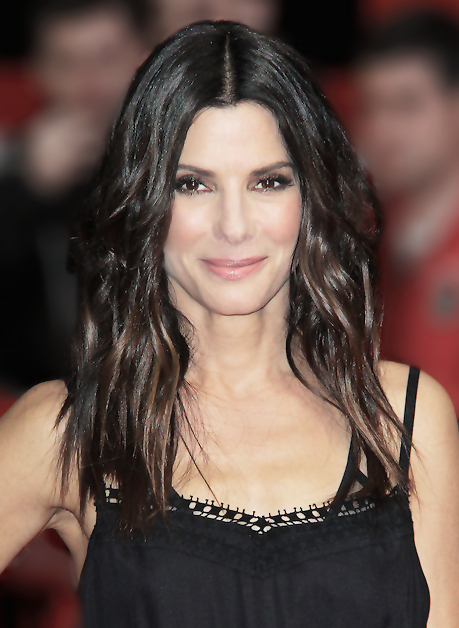
Bullock at the UK gala screening of The Heat in June 2013

While originally intended to be released on April 5, 2013, Fox pushed back the release date to June 28, 2013. The film held its world premiere in New York City on June 23, 2013. It was released to theaters in the United States on June 28, 2013.

=== Marketing ===
The first official full-length trailer of the film was released on October 27, 2012.

=== Home media ===
The Heat was released on DVD and Blu-ray Disc on October 15, 2013. The Blu-ray features an unrated version of the film, along with several audio commentaries: one with McCarthy and director Feig; one with the actors who portray the Mullins family; and one with the original Mystery Science Theater 3000 crew.

== Reception ==
=== Box office ===
The Heat grossed $159.6 million in the United States and Canada, and $70.3 million internationally, for a worldwide total of $229.9 million, against a production budget of $43 million. Deadline Hollywood calculated the film made a net profit of $61.8 million, when factoring together all expenses and revenues.

The film earned $39.1 million in its opening weekend, finishing second at the box office behind Monsters University.

=== Critical response ===
On Rotten Tomatoes the film has an approval rating of 66%, based on 183 reviews with an average rating of 6.2/10. The website's critical consensus reads: "The Heat is predictable, but Melissa McCarthy is reliably funny and Sandra Bullock proves a capable foil." On Metacritic, the film has a score of 60 out of 100 based on reviews from 37 critics, indicating "mixed or average reviews". Audiences polled by CinemaScore gave the film an average grade of "A−" on an A+ to F scale.

Positive reviews lauded Bullock and McCarthy's comedic performances. Critic Christy Lemire wrote: “the first produced script from Katie Dippold gives her a smart, inspired and wickedly funny foundation from which to work, and she and Bullock enjoy gangbusters chemistry with each other.”

Wesley Morris wrote in Grantland: “My skepticism going in had to do with The Heat being a movie with two female characters that easily could have been played by a pair of men. But these two are like workplace sexism’s toxic side effects. Ashburn is the ambitious professional who lives only for promotions. Mullins is the anti-feminine ballbuster. Nobody likes either of them. And they don’t like each other until they do. This is generic genre stuff with a realish female friendship at its center: It’s a bra-mance.”

Owen Gleiberman of Entertainment Weekly gave the film a grade of B and wrote: “The director, Paul Feig, possesses a highly developed radar for the alternating currents of competition and camaraderie in female relationships. As he proved in Bridesmaids (2011)…Feig understands how women who don’t like each other express their antipathy — in ways both more direct and less direct than what men do. In The Heat, Feig stages scenes like Richard Donner (Lethal Weapon) with a touch of George Cukor (The Women). He has made a piece of smash-and-grab policier pulp that, through the interplay of Bullock and McCarthy, spins to its own snarly/confessional feminine beat.”

In contrast, Mick LaSalle of The San Francisco Chronicle called the film both formulaic and inspired, but acknowledged "the inspiration is in the combining of these two actresses." In another mixed review, Keith Uhlich of Time Out said Bullock and McCarthy deserved better material, and also criticized the trailer for giving the impression that this was a less funny film.

=== Accolades ===
Award	Category	Recipient(s)	Result	Ref.
Alliance of Women Film Journalists	Actress Most in Need of a New Agent	Melissa McCarthy	Nominated	
American Comedy Awards	Best Comedy Actress - Film	Sandra Bullock	Nominated	
American Comedy Awards	Best Comedy Actress - Film	Melissa McCarthy	Won	
American Comedy Awards	Funniest Motion Picture		Nominated	
Teen Choice Awards	Choice Summer Movie Star: Female	Sandra Bullock	Won	
Teen Choice Awards	Choice Summer Movie Star: Female	Melissa McCarthy	Nominated	
Teen Choice Awards	Choice Movie Chemistry	Sandra Bullock; Melissa McCarthy	Won	
Teen Choice Awards	Choice Summer Movie Comedy		Nominated	
Teen Choice Awards	Choice Movie: Hissy Fit	Melissa McCarthy	Nominated	
Critics' Choice Movie Awards	Best Actress in a Comedy	Melissa McCarthy	Nominated	
Critics' Choice Movie Awards	Best Actress in a Comedy	Sandra Bullock	Nominated	
Critics' Choice Movie Awards	Best Comedy Movie		Nominated	
Golden Trailer Awards	Don LaFontaine Award for Best Voice Over	20th Century Fox	Nominated	
Golden Trailer Awards	Best Comedy TV Spot	20th Century Fox; Open Road Entertainment	Nominated	
MTV Movie Awards	Best Comedic Performance	Melissa McCarthy	Nominated	
People's Choice Awards	Favorite Comedic Movie		Won	
People's Choice Awards	Favorite Comedic Movie Actress	Melissa McCarthy	Nominated	
People's Choice Awards	Favorite Comedic Movie Actress	Sandra Bullock	Won	
People's Choice Awards	Favorite Movie Duo	Sandra Bullock; Melissa McCarthy	Nominated	
St. Louis Gateway Film Critics Association	Best Film-Comedy		Nominated	
Women Film Critics Circle	Best Comedic Actress	Melissa McCarthy	Won	

== Cancelled sequel and proposed spin-off ==
Shortly after the film's release, director Feig announced that the film would be followed by a sequel. In October 2013, Bullock stated that she will not return for the sequel and the project itself was put on hold. Instead, the sequel was reportedly being replaced by a spin-off film that will centre around Jamie Denbo and Jessica Chaffin's characters Beth and Gina from the first film.
