= Spoken Reasons =

American actor

- Born: John Alfonza Baker Jr. December 19, 1988 (age 37); Bradenton, Florida, U.S.
- Other names: J.B. Hart, J.B.DaPoet, Big Spoke Draco
- Occupations: YouTuber; actor; poet
- Children: 1

YouTube information
- Channel: Spoken Reasons
- Years active: 2008–present
- Subscribers: 1.86 million
- Views: 316 million
- Last updated: December 12, 2025
- Website: spokenreasonstv.com

John Alfonza Baker Jr. (born December 19, 1988), better known by his stage name Spoken Reasons, is an American YouTuber.

Baker grew up in Bradenton, Florida. He began a YouTube channel in 2008, which as of August 2016 had accumulated over 1.9 million subscribers and 280 million total video views.

He made his feature film debut in a supporting role for the 20th Century Fox comedy, The Heat, which opened on June 28, 2013.

Baker partnered with Russell Simmons' All Def Digital in 2013, and worked with recording artist Priscilla Renea. He appeared in the third season of Real Husbands of Hollywood.

== Filmography/television ==
Actor
Year	Film^{[25]}	Role^{[25]}
2012	"Relationship Games" (Short Film)	Writer, Producer, Cinematography, Executive Producer, Mike
2013	"Relationship Games" 2 (Short Film)	Writer, Producer, Executive Producer, Mike
2013	"Relationship Games" 3 (Short Film)	Writer, Producer, Executive Producer, Mike
2013	The Heat	Terrell Rojas
2013 -	Relationship Games 4 (Short Film)	Writer, Producer, Executive Producer, Mike
2013 -	Adopted White Girl (Short Film)	Writer, Director, Producer, Executive Producer, Uncle Earl, James
2014	’’ Wild N Out’’	Himself
2014	Real Husbands of Hollywood	Himself
2015	Sex & Friendship 1-2 (Short Film)	Writer, Director, Producer, Executive Producer, Kenny
2013 – 15	Dr. Reasons	Dr. Reasons (All Def Digital Web series)
2016	"Home From College" (Short Film)	Writer, Director, Producer, Executive Producer, Cinematography, Justin
2018	"Woke & Regular" (Short Film)	Writer, Director, Producer, Executive Producer, Cinematography, Himself
2018	"Deal With The Devil" - The Movie (Independent Feature)	Writer, Director, Producer, Executive Producer, Cinematography, Music, Himself
2020 - (In Production)	"The Root Of Spoken Word" (Documentary)	Director, Producer, Executive Producer, Cinematography
