= Attitudes! =

Comedy podcast and TV show

- Genre: Comedy
- Language: English

Cast and voices
- Hosted by: Erin Gibson and Bryan Safi

Production
- Length: 45-70 minutes

Technical specifications
- Audio format: MP3

Publication
- Original release: November 9, 2011; 14 years ago
- Provider: Independent as of August 2021
- Updates: Weekly

Attitudes! (formerly Throwing Shade) is a weekly comedy podcast based on discussions of women's rights, LGBTQ+ rights, progressive politics and pop culture. The podcast is hosted by ("Feminasty") Erin Gibson and ("Homosensual") Bryan Safi. Gibson and Safi's comedic repartee frequently features adult topics and addresses social, cultural, and political issues.

== Format ==
Each episode consists of a series of topical comedic dialogues and sparring between the co-hosts, plus occasional interviews with notable guests. Gibson and Safi then each present a topical issue concerning gender rights and LGBTQ+ rights. At the end of the show, they read iTunes reviews from their listeners and offer various music, TV, or movie recommendations.

== History ==
Gibson and Safi met while performing at the Upright Citizens Brigade Theatre in Los Angeles, and continued to work together as writers and hosts on InfoMania, on the Current TV network. They released the first episode of Throwing Shade on November 9, 2011.

On March 5, 2012, it was announced that Throwing Shade was joining the Maximum Fun podcast network.

Throwing Shade has earned the People's Choice Podcast Award for Best LGBT Podcast two years in a row (2012,2013).

On January 17, 2017, the first television episode of Throwing Shade aired on TV Land. The show reflected their podcast in which Gibson and Safi tackled political and social issues concerting women's rights and the LGBTQ+ community. The show lasted one season with 10 episodes before being cancelled.

On June 28, 2017, The Maximum Fun Network announced that Throwing Shade would be leaving the network. They subsequently joined the Earwolf Network.

On October 15, 2020, it was announced Throwing Shade was renamed Attitudes!

In July 2021, Attitudes! left Earwolf with Episode 502. Gibson and Safi launched the show on Patreon later that month.

== Hosts ==
=== Bryan Safi ===
Safi is a writer, actor, director, and television personality primarily known for his role in the popular podcast and television show on TV Land. He is also the writer / co-creator of That's Gay, a television segment focused on gay issues that aired on Current TV, an Emmy Award winning staff writer for the Ellen DeGeneres Show, and was a staff writer on Fashion Police with Joan Rivers and FunnyOrDie.com. Safi has appeared on the Upright Citizens Brigade stage for many years and has had numerous appearances on television shows including The Big Bang Theory, Modern Family, Superstore, and Adam Ruins Everything, and has a recurring role on 9-1-1 as "Josh Russo". In November 2020, Safi was cast in a recurring role on the third season of the Netflix psychological thriller series You.

In November 2019, Safi and co-host "Ronna Glickman", as played by Jessica Chaffin, premiered a new podcast called Ask Ronna. Safi and Chaffin's show focuses on requests for advice and questions from listeners, and often feature a celebrity guest.

In March 2023, Safi launched his third ongoing podcast, "No Autographs, Please!" with friend and comedian Arden Myrin. They describe the podcast as a "hybrid improv comedy and chat show."

=== Erin Gibson ===
Gibson is a writer, director, comedian, and television personality and is a vocal advocate for the rights of women and an ardent supporter of the LGBTQ+ community. Gibson has hosted segments on Current TV's Infomania which comically addressed the way women are treated in media around the world. As an actress, she has had appearances on Kroll Show, Key and Peele, and Parks and Recreation, and has various other acting credits stretching back to 2006. She was a regular contributor to HuffPost, from 2012 to 2017, and was nominated for the Primetime Emmy Award for Outstanding Short Form Variety Series in 2016, 2018 and 2019 for her work on Funny or Die's "Gay of Thrones". In 2018, her comedic book Feminasty was published.

In October 2020, it was announced the Gibson would serve as showrunner on the Tiny Toons reboot at HBO Max, titled Tiny Toons Looniversity.

== Spinoff series ==
=== Throwing Shoscar ===
In early 2019, Earwolf released a spinoff miniseries podcast, called Throwing Shoscar, hosted by Bryan Safi and "Ronna Glickman" (played by Jessica Chaffin) which focused on the 2019 Academy Awards season. In the miniseries, the hosts discussed the strong contenders for that year's awards ceremony, and subsequent episodes discussed the actual winners (and losers) of the major awards. The show returned in 2020 to discuss that year's Academy Awards ceremony with guests Kate Aurthur, Editor-at-large, Variety and Adam B. Vary, Senior Entertainment Writer, Variety. Features of the episode included determining which celebrities were snubbed and special performances of the year's Best Song nominations.

=== Groceries ===
On August 25, 2019, Safi and Gibson premiered an episode on the Earwolf Podcast Network called Groceries. It is the expansion of an existing segment from the original podcast, in which the hosts discuss all things related to their experiences inside of grocery stores. Every episode, ("Bag Lady") Erin Gibson and ("If you're shoppin', I'm-") Bryan Safi each pick a grocery store and talk about the history of the store as well as their experience shopping there. They review everything from the music playing in the store to quality of the carts. The first season of Groceries is available on any podcast platform, but season 2 is currently only available on Stitcher Premium.

A third season premiered in 2022. Seasons one and three are available on the show's Patreon.

=== Dateline Recap ===
In August 2021, Attitudes! began releasing Patreon-exclusive bonus episodes under the "Totally Tudes!" banner, starting with Safi's monthly recaps of Dateline NBC episodes.

=== Dolls ===
In November 2021, Gibson launched Dolls, a Patreon-exclusive "Totally Tudes!" limited series. The thirty-ninth and final episode of Dolls was released May 18, 2023.

== Funding ==
The podcast was produced by Jesse Thorn's podcast and radio production network, Maximum Fun. Funding for Maximum Fun, Inc. is raised through underwriting and corporate sponsorship, as well as individual membership donations.

The show was formerly produced by the Earwolf network. As of August 2021 they run independently through Patreon.

== See also ==
- List of LGBT podcasts
