= Spy (2015 film) =

2015 film by Paul Feig

- Theatrical release poster
- Directed by: Paul Feig
- Written by: Paul Feig; Katie Dippold (uncredited revision)
- Produced by: Peter Chernin; Jenno Topping; Paul Feig; Jessie Henderson
- Starring: Melissa McCarthy; Jason Statham; Rose Byrne; Miranda Hart; Bobby Cannavale; Allison Janney; Jude Law
- Cinematography: Robert Yeoman
- Edited by: Brent White; Melissa Bretherton
- Music by: Theodore Shapiro
- Production companies: Chernin Entertainment; Feigco Entertainment
- Distributed by: 20th Century Fox
- Release dates: March 15, 2015 (SXSW); June 5, 2015 (United States)
- Running time: 120 minutes
- Country: United States
- Language: English
- Budget: $65 million
- Box office: $235.7 million

Spy is a 2015 American spy action comedy film written and directed by Paul Feig. It stars Melissa McCarthy, Jason Statham, Rose Byrne, and Jude Law, alongside Miranda Hart, Bobby Cannavale, Peter Serafinowicz, Morena Baccarin, Nargis Fakhri, and Allison Janney in supporting roles. The film follows unorthodox secret agent Susan Cooper (McCarthy) as she tries to trace a stolen portable nuclear device.

Produced by Peter Chernin, Jenno Topping, Feig, and Jessie Henderson, Spy had its world premiere at South by Southwest on March 15, 2015, and was theatrically released in the United States on June 5, 2015, by 20th Century Fox. Spy received praise for Feig's direction and screenplay, McCarthy and Byrne's performances, as well as Statham's unexpectedly comedic performance. The film grossed $235 million worldwide against a $65 million budget. It was nominated for two Golden Globe Awards: Best Motion Picture – Musical or Comedy and Best Actress in a Motion Picture – Musical or Comedy for McCarthy.

== Plot ==
Susan Cooper is a desk-bound CIA agent who remotely assists her partner, field agent Bradley Fine, whom she has feelings for, on his missions. Fine accidentally kills arms dealer Tihomir Boyanov before Boyanov can tell Fine where a suitcase nuke is hidden.

Susan discovers Boyanov's daughter, Rayna, has contacted terrorist middleman Sergio De Luca, so Fine infiltrates her home. Rayna reveals she knows the identities of the agency's field agents, including Rick Ford and Karen Walker, then kills Fine.

Since Susan has never been in the field and is therefore unknown to Rayna, she volunteers to track Rayna herself and her boss, Elaine Crocker, agrees. Ford objects due to Susan's inexperience and quits in protest.

With her best friend and colleague Nancy providing remote intelligence, Susan travels to Paris. A rogue Ford follows her there, repeatedly interfering in her mission. Susan discovers De Luca's office has been burned down, but finds a photo of a man at the fire. She sees the man from the photo switch Ford's backpack with one containing a bomb. She saves Ford and pursues the man, accidentally killing him. Susan finds proof that De Luca is going to Rome and is sent after him.

Susan's contact there is Italian agent Aldo. Following De Luca into a casino, Susan saves Rayna's life from an assassination attempt. In response, Rayna invites Susan to join her in Budapest via private jet. Mid-flight, the steward kills Rayna's crew, but Susan subdues him and convinces a suspicious Rayna that she is a bodyguard who was hired by Rayna's father.

After being shot at, Susan catches the would-be assassin: Karen, who sold Rayna the agents' names. She tries to shoot Susan, but a sniper kills her first. Susan, Nancy and Aldo accompany Rayna to a party to meet Rayna's contact, Lia. Susan catches her and, during a brutal fight, is saved from death by Fine, who is revealed to have faked his murder and is Rayna's lover and associate. Rayna imprisons Susan and Aldo, but Fine visits them, revealing that he is undercover, gaining Rayna's trust to locate the nuke, and he saved Susan by killing Karen. Susan and Aldo escape, and she follows Fine and Rayna to De Luca's mansion. She convinces them that the CIA has mistreated her so she has switched sides, and will do anything to protect Fine, as she loves him.

Terrorist Solsa Dudaev arrives and gives De Luca a suitcase full of diamonds as payment for the nuke. De Luca has Dudaev and his men killed, revealing his plan to resell the device, then prepares to shoot Rayna. Ford arrives and unintentionally distracts him, allowing Susan to kill his men.

De Luca escapes by helicopter with the device and the diamonds, but Susan manages to jump on. In the struggle, she throws the diamonds and the device into the lake below. De Luca attempts to shoot her, but Nancy shoots him dead first. The nuke is retrieved and Rayna is arrested, but makes peace with Susan. Ford realizes he has underestimated Susan and compliments her. Crocker officially makes Susan a field agent and gives her another assignment in Prague. Fine wonders if what Susan said about loving him is true but Susan realizes she no longer has feelings for Fine.

The next morning, Susan wakes up in bed next to Ford and screams at having slept with him; Ford rolls his eyes and claims she loved it.

== Cast ==
- Melissa McCarthy as Susan Cooper
- Jason Statham as Rick Ford
- Rose Byrne as Rayna Boyanov
- Jude Law as Bradley Fine
- Miranda Hart as Nancy B. Artingstall
- Bobby Cannavale as Sergio De Luca
- Allison Janney as Elaine Crocker
- Peter Serafinowicz as Aldo
- Morena Baccarin as Karen Walker
- Björn Gustafsson as Anton
- Nargis Fakhri as Lia
- Richard Brake as Solsa Dudaev
- 50 Cent as himself
- Carlos Ponce as Matthew Wright
- Will Yun Lee as Timothy Cress
- Michael McDonald as Patrick
- Mitch Silpa as Fredrick
- Zach Woods as Man in purple bow tie
- Jessica Chaffin as Sharon
- Katie Dippold as Katherine
- Sam Richardson as John
- Julian Miller as Nicola
- Ben Falcone as American tourist
- Jamie Denbo as Casino hostess
- Steve Bannos as Alan, the bartender
- Verka Serduchka as himself
- Paul Feig as a drunken guest at the Paris hotel (uncredited)
- Yuri Buzzi as Roman waiter

== Production ==
=== Development ===
On June 18, 2013, it was announced that Paul Feig was developing Susan Cooper, a female spy comedy, for 20th Century Fox. Feig wrote and directed the film. Peter Chernin and Jenno Topping produced the film under the Chernin Entertainment banner, with Feig and Jessie Henderson for Feigco Entertainment. On November 12, 2013, Fox announced a release date of May 22, 2015. On March 28, 2014, the film's title was changed to Spy.

=== Casting ===
On July 25, 2013, it was confirmed that Melissa McCarthy was in negotiations to play the title role. Zooey Deschanel was originally slated to play the role of Elaine Crocker but left the project. On October 17, Rose Byrne joined the cast of the film playing the main villain. Throughout 2014, Jason Statham, Jude Law, Nargis Fakhri, Miranda Hart, Bobby Cannavale, Peter Serafinowicz, Björn Gustafsson. Morena Baccarin, Allison Janney, Zach Woods and Jessica Chaffin joined the cast, along with 50 Cent, who would be playing himself, and Nia Long, who did not appear in the finished film.

=== Filming ===
Principal photography and production began on March 31, 2014, in Budapest, Hungary. On May 27, filming was under way in Budapest and was about to wrap up. Apart from tax breaks, shooting was primarily done in Budapest because its architecture and location could allow it to appear as other places where the story took place, including Paris. A prosthetic was used for shots of Nicola (Julian Miller) exposing himself. The production team of Spy had to present prosthetics used in the shots to the MPAA for rating. A part of the shooting was done by Lake Balaton, Central Europe’s largest lake.

== Release ==
=== Theatrical issues ===
The US release of film was originally scheduled for May 22, 2015, by 20th Century Fox. In March 2015, the date was pushed back to June 5, 2015, which was first assigned to B.O.O.: Bureau of Otherworldly Operations and Paper Towns; the former of which being taken off the schedule and cancelled, while the latter moved to July. Prior to its official release, Paul Feig stated that Spy went through about 10 test screenings, a process – which includes recording the audience laughter for each version – he does "religiously", with Judd Apatow (who produced the Feig-directed Bridesmaids) commenting on its usefulness for a comedy film: "It doesn't work very well if a movie is supposed to make you feel difficult emotions. If you're making a David Lynch movie, it doesn't work at all. But for comedy it's often the best way to refine jokes."

Spy was released on May 21, 2015, in Australia, Malaysia and Vietnam, and of May 28, 2015 in Israel and May 29, 2015, in Norway.

=== Home media ===
Spy was released on DVD and Blu-ray on September 29, 2015.

== Reception ==
=== Box office ===
Spy grossed $110.8 million in North America and $124.8 million in other territories for a global total of $235.6 million, against a budget of $65 million.

In North America, the film made $1.5 million from its early Thursday night showings and an estimated $10.3 million on its opening day from 3,711 theaters, coming at second place at the box office behind fellow new release Insidious: Chapter 3. It would go on to top the box office in its opening weekend, earning $29 million. The film dropped 46% in its sophomore weekend to $15.6 million, finishing second behind newcomer Jurassic World.

Outside North America, Spy opened in ten foreign markets on May 22, 2015, earning $12.7 million in its opening weekend from 1,810 screens, and coming in fourth place at the box office (behind Mad Max: Fury Road, Tomorrowland, and Pitch Perfect 2). In the UK, Ireland and Malta, it opened with $3.9 million. The film had successful openings in South Korea ($4.8 million), Russia and the CIS ($3.1 million), Australia ($2.9 million), Mexico ($1.6 million) and Taiwan ($1.3 million).

=== Critical response ===
Spy received praise for Feig's direction and screenplay, McCarthy and Byrne's performances, as well as Statham's surprise comedic role. On the review aggregator website Rotten Tomatoes, 94% of 260 critics' reviews are positive. The website's consensus reads: "Simultaneously broad and progressive, Spy offers further proof that Melissa McCarthy and writer-director Paul Feig bring out the best in one another — and delivers scores of belly laughs along the way." Metacritic, which uses a weighted average, assigned the film a score of 75 out of 100, based on 40 critics, indicating "generally favorable" reviews. Audiences polled by CinemaScore gave the film an average score of "B+" on an A+ to F scale.

McCarthy's performance was praised by critics. Richard Roeper of The Chicago Sun Times called her "as funny and as winning as anyone in the movies these days". Tom Russo of The Boston Globe credited the film's success to McCarthy, writing, "part of what makes the action comedy such a loopy blast is the identity shifts she pulls on the audience." Bill Goodykoontz of Arizona Republic called the film McCarthy's return to form, writing "Finally, after the promise shown in Bridesmaids, but sold short since by weak scripts in films like Tammy and Identity Thief, Melissa McCarthy gets a movie vehicle worthy of her talents."

In addition to McCarthy's, many of the supporting cast members' performances were praised, particularly Byrne's and Statham's. John Boone of Entertainment Tonight said Statham "twists his action hero persona into a delightfully delusional version of the same thing", and praised Byrne's performance, writing "For every joke that McCarthy's Susan Cooper ends up as the butt of, Byrne is the one teeing it up with perfectly understated wickedness. She can so easily spit out lines as offensive as, after Cooper delivers a punny cheers, "What a stupid, f**king toast," but make it...charming?" Peter Travers of Rolling Stone called Byrne's comedic timing "bitchy perfection".

=== Accolades ===
Award	Category	Recipients	Result
Critics' Choice Movie Awards	Best Comedy		Nominated
Critics' Choice Movie Awards	Best Actress in a Comedy	Melissa McCarthy	Nominated
Critics' Choice Movie Awards	Best Actor in a Comedy	Jason Statham	Nominated
Evening Standard British Film Awards	Award for Comedy	Jason Statham	Nominated
Empire Awards	Best Comedy		Won
Georgia Film Critics Association	Best Supporting Actress	Rose Byrne	Nominated
Glamour Awards	Comedy Actress	Melissa McCarthy	Nominated
Glamour Awards	Comedy Actress	Rose Byrne	Won
Golden Globe Awards	Best Motion Picture – Musical or Comedy		Nominated
Golden Globe Awards	Best Actress in a Motion Picture – Musical or Comedy	Melissa McCarthy	Nominated
Golden Trailer Awards	Best Comedy	"Secret Agent"	Nominated
Las Vegas Film Critics Society	Best Comedy Film		Nominated
MTV Movie Awards	Best Comedic Performance	Melissa McCarthy	Nominated
MTV Movie Awards	Best Fight	Melissa McCarthy vs. Nargis Fakhri	Nominated
People's Choice Awards	Favorite Comedic Movie		Nominated
People's Choice Awards	Favorite Comedic Movie Actress	Melissa McCarthy	Won
Phoenix Critics Circle	Best Comedy Film		Nominated
Saturn Awards	Best Action or Adventure Film		Nominated
St. Louis Gateway Film Critics Association	Best Film – Comedy		Nominated
Teen Choice Awards	Choice Summer Movie		Nominated
Teen Choice Awards	Choice Summer Movie Star: Female	Melissa McCarthy	Nominated
Teen Choice Awards	Choice Movie: Hissy Fit	Melissa McCarthy	Nominated
Teen Choice Awards	Choice Movie: Villain	Rose Byrne	Nominated
Utah Film Critics Association	Best Supporting Actor - Female	Rose Byrne	Won
Village Voice Film Poll	Best Supporting Actress	Rose Byrne	Nominated
Women Film Critics Circle	Best Comedic Actress	Melissa McCarthy	Nominated

== Possible sequel ==
In a May 2015 interview with The Guardian, Paul Feig said he was already writing a sequel, that includes Jason Statham's Agent Ford, though the project doesn't have a producer. In 2019, Feig explained that although a sequel to Spy could still happen, "there hasn't been any interest from the studio" in the project. In May 2023, McCarthy confirmed that everyone wants to do the sequel, but it hasn't been greenlit yet.
