= Return of the Mac (TV series) =

American TV sitcom

- Genre: Sitcom
- Created by: Joey McIntyre; Paul Greenberg
- Developed by: Tim Gibbons; Mike Glock; Paul Greenberg; Heather Rutman
- Starring: Joey McIntyre; Adam Ray; Jamie Denbo; Katie Wee; Punam Patel; Barrett McIntyre
- Country of origin: United States
- Original language: English
- No. of seasons: 1
- No. of episodes: 8

Production
- Executive producers: Jenny Daly; Rob Lobl; Paul Greenberg; Jonathan Baruch; Tim Gibbons; Jenny McCarthy; Joey McIntyre; Donnie Wahlberg
- Running time: 22 minutes
- Production companies: D&J Productions; T Group Productions; CBS Television Studios

Original release
- Network: Pop
- Release: April 12 – May 31, 2017

Return of the Mac is an American sitcom that was created by Joey McIntyre and Paul Greenberg. The series stars Joey McIntyre, Adam Ray, Jamie Denbo, Katie Wee, Punam Patel and Barrett McIntyre. The series premiered on Pop on April 12, 2017.

== Cast ==
- Joey McIntyre as Joey McIntyre
- Adam Ray as Alex
- Jamie Denbo as Sam Kandor
- Katie Wee as Paige Kwan
- Punam Patel as Soozie
- Barrett McIntyre as Barrett McIntyre
- Donnie Wahlberg as Donnie Wahlberg
- Jenny McCarthy as Jenny McCarthy
- Griffin McIntyre as Griffin McIntyre
- Rhys McIntyre as Rhys McIntyre
- Kira McIntyre as Kira McIntyre
- Anthony Gioe as Flan
- Jordan Black as Malcolm

== Episodes ==
No.	Title	Directed by	Written by	Original release date	Prod. code	U.S. viewers (millions)
1	"New Kid on the Talk"	Heath Cullens	Tim Gibbons, Mike Glock, Paul Greenberg & Heather Rutman	April 12, 2017	101	0.069
2	"The Other Joey"	Heath Cullens	Mike Glock & Heather Rutman	April 19, 2017	102	0.091
3	"The Wrong Stuff"	Henry Chan	Mike Glock	April 26, 2017	103	0.047
4	"When You Can't Stop to Go"	Henry Chan	Paul Greenberg	May 3, 2017	104	0.056
5	"Daytime Nightmare"	Heath Cullens	Tim Gibbons	May 10, 2017	105	0.078
6	"Celebrity Tantrum"	Heath Cullens	Heather Rutman	May 17, 2017	106	0.061
7	"An Offer Joe Can't Refuse"	Henry Chan	Paul Greenberg	May 24, 2017	107	0.037
8	"The Joe Must Go On"	Henry Chan	Tim Gibbons	May 31, 2017	108	N/A
