= John Ross Bowie =

American actor (born 1971)

- Bowie in 2026
- Born: May 30, 1971 (age 55)
- Occupations: Actor, screenwriter, comedian
- Years active: 1999–present
- Spouse: Jamie Denbo (m. 2004)
- Children: 2

John Ross Bowie (/baʊiː/; born May 30, 1971) is an American actor and comedian. He is best known for playing Barry Kripke in the The Big Bang Theory franchise and Jimmy DiMeo on Speechless, in addition to over 100 film and TV credits.

== Early life and education ==
Bowie was raised in New York City. He graduated from the Bayard Rustin High School for the Humanities in 1989 and earned a Bachelor of Arts in English and a teaching credential from Ithaca College. He taught English for one year in New York.

== Career ==
=== Improv ===
Bowie is a regular sketch comedy performer at the Upright Citizens Brigade Theater (UCBT) in New York and Los Angeles. At UCBT he was a member of the sketch troupe "The Naked Babies" with comedians Rob Corddry, Seth Morris, and Brian Huskey. The group appeared at the 1999 Big Stinkin' International Improv & Sketch Comedy Festival in Austin, Texas.

=== Television ===
He had a recurring role in Corddry's Adult Swim series Childrens Hospital. A former member of New York pop punk band Egghead., he worked with Big Bang Theory co-star Kevin Sussman to create two television comedies, The Ever After Part and The Second Coming of Rob.

He appeared in What the Bleep Do We Know!? opposite Marlee Matlin and made guest appearances on shows such as Reno 911!, Curb Your Enthusiasm, Glee, and Good Luck Charlie. In March 2011, he appeared in a series of commercials for the Ford Motor Company.

He is reprising his role of Barry Kripke on Stuart Fails To Save The Universe, which premiered on July 23, 2026 on HBOMax.

=== Author ===
Bowie has written for Go Metric and The New York Press, and has authored a book on the cult movie Heathers.

His memoir, No Job For A Man, was published in November 2022 by Pegasus Books, a division of Simon & Schuster. Publishers Weekly called the book a "smart, pithy memoir with an earnest emotional arc."

== Personal life ==
Bowie married comedian Jamie Denbo in 2004. They have two children. Bowie was raised Episcopalian, but converted to Judaism in 2025.

== Filmography ==
=== Film ===
Film
| Year | Title | Role | Notes |
|---|---|---|---|
| 2000 | Road Trip | Waiter | |
| 2004 | Blackballed: The Bobby Dukes Story | Daniel Benjamin | |
| 2004 | What the Bleep Do We Know!? | Elliot | |
| 2005 | Life of the Party | Bert | |
| 2006 | The Santa Clause 3: The Escape Clause | Rory | |
| 2007 | Because I Said So | Cute Food Spewing Guy | |
| 2008 | Sex Drive | Dr. Clark Teddescoe | |
| 2009 | He's Just Not That Into You | Dan the Wiccan | |
| 2010 | Fully Loaded | Richard | |
| 2013 | iSteve | John Sculley | Internet movie |
| 2013 | The Heat | FBI Agent | |
| 2016 | Pet | Jessup | |
| 2016 | Between Us | Patritzio | |
| 2019 | Jumanji: The Next Level | Cavendish | |
| 2020 | Bad Therapy | Nick | |
| 2022 | Witchy | Ken | Short film |
| 2026 | The Brink of War | Kenneth Adelman | |

=== Television ===
Television
| Year | Title | Role | Notes |
|---|---|---|---|
| 1999–2000 | Upright Citizens Brigade | Various | 3 episodes |
| 2001 | Undeclared | Television Presenter | Episode: "Sick in the Head" |
| 2003 | A.U.S.A. | Wally Berman | Main cast; 8 episodes |
| 2004 | Happy Family | CocoNate | Episode: "The Juicer" |
| 2004 | Joan of Arcadia | Mr. Campbell | Episode: "Do the Math" |
| 2004 | CSI: NY | Lester Jayne | Episode: "American Dreamers" |
| 2004 | Charmed | Marcus | Episode: "Once in a Blue Moon" |
| 2004 | Kevin Hill | Wayne Ellis | Episode: "Making the Grade" |
| 2004 | Girlfriends | Ian Greenfield | Episode: "Porn to Write" |
| 2005 | Las Vegas | Adam Clemo | Episode: "Hit Me!" |
| 2005 | Cheap Seats: Without Ron Parker | Client | Episode: "1995 SuperDogs! Superjocks!" |
| 2005–2008 | Reno 911! | Various characters | 4 episodes |
| 2006 | Psych | George Cheslow | Episode: "Weekend Warriors" |
| 2007 | Heroes | Attorney | Episode: "Godsend" |
| 2007 | CSI: Crime Scene Investigation | Peter Ellis | Episode: "A La Cart" |
| 2008 | Monk | Tom Donovan | Episode: "Mr. Monk Joins a Cult" |
| 2008 | The Mighty B! | Integritone 2 (voice) | 2 episodes; screenwriter |
| 2008 | Worst Week | Rob | Episode: "The Apartment" |
| 2009 | Wizards Of Waverly Place | Simon | Episode: "Fairy Tale" |
| 2009 | Trust Me | | Episode: "Way Beyond the Call" |
| 2009 | Family Guy | Unnamed character in Shoving Buddies (voice) | Episode: "Peter's Progress" |
| 2009 | Curb Your Enthusiasm | John Fowler | Episode: "Denise Handicapped" |
| 2009 | Glee | Dennis | Episode: "Mattress" |
| 2009; 2011–2019 | The Big Bang Theory | Barry Kripke | Recurring; 25 episodes |
| 2010 | Party Down | Stuart | Episode: "Constance Carmell Wedding" |
| 2010 | The Glades | Joe Thomas | Episode: "Doppelganger" |
| 2010 | Weeds | Contest Organiser | Episode: "Pinwheels and Whirligigs" |
| 2010 | Melissa & Joey | Lewis Scanlon | Episode: "A Fright in the Attic" |
| 2010–2011 | Childrens Hospital | Dr. Max von Sydow | 4 episodes |
| 2010–2013 | Good Luck Charlie | Walter | 2 episodes |
| 2011 | The Glee Project | Dennis | Episode: "Individuality" |
| 2011 | State of Georgia | Professor | Episode: "Pilot" |
| 2011 | Burn Notice | Paul Burkowski | Episode: "No Good Deed" |
| 2011 | Bones | Lawrence Deighton | Episode: "The Prince in the Plastic" |
| 2012 | House of Lies | Spalding Winter | Episode: "Microphallus" |
| 2012 | Happy Endings | Michael | Episode: "You Snooze, You Bruise" |
| 2012 | Retired at 35 | Jared | 7 episodes |
| 2012 | The League | Dr. Pete Wyland | Episode: "Bro-Lo El Cordero" |
| 2012–2014 | The Exes | Jeff | 2 episodes |
| 2013 | Whitney | Eddie | Episode: "Two Broke Hearts" |
| 2013 | Brooklyn Nine-Nine | Sister Steve | Episode: "Halloween" |
| 2013–2015 | Sofia the First | Sven the Seahorse (voice) | 2 episodes |
| 2014 | Episodes | Psychiatrist | 5 episodes |
| 2014 | About a Boy | Fiona's Male Boss | Episode: "About a Buble" |
| 2014 | Riot | Competitor | Regular cast |
| 2014 | Hot in Cleveland | Benny | Episode: "Undercover Lovers" |
| 2014 | Newsreaders | Pat Fenis | Episode: "Roswell, New Mexico; Skip Goes to a Wedding" |
| 2014 | The Wrong Mans | David Kinsman | 4 episodes |
| 2014–2015 | Chasing Life | Paul Peters | 7 episodes |
| 2014–2016 | @midnight | Himself | 2 episodes |
| 2015 | Marry Me | What's-His-Name | Episode: "Test Me" |
| 2015 | Fresh Off the Boat | Lance | Episode: "We Done Son" |
| 2016 | Love | Rob | Episode: "It Begins" |
| 2016 | Veep | Focus Group Member | Episode: "C**tgate" |
| 2016–2019 | Speechless | Jimmy DiMeo | Main cast; 63 episodes |
| 2017 | Death in Paradise | Tyler McCarthy | Episode: "In the Footsteps of a Killer" |
| 2017 | I'm Sorry | Ben | Episode: "Butt Bumpers" |
| 2018 | Big Hero 6: The Series | Dr. Mel Meyers (voice) | Episode: "Aunt Cass Goes Out" |
| 2018–2019 | Milo Murphy's Law | Loab (voice) | 4 episodes |
| 2019 | Carol's Second Act | Gordon | Episode: "Therapy Dogs" |
| 2020 | The George Lucas Talk Show | Himself | Episode: "COVID-1138: More American Willoweenie: The Battle for Elector" |
| 2021 | Feel Good | Scott | Recurring; 5 episodes |
| 2021 | Generation | Patrick | 6 episodes |
| 2021–2022 | United States of Al | Professor Brett Williams | Recurring; 5 episodes |
| 2022 | The Rookie | Alan | Episode: "Long Shot" |
| 2022 | Grace and Frankie | Fred | Episode: "The Beginning" |
| 2022 | Station 19 | Paul | Episode: "Demons" |
| 2022 | Reno 911!: It's a Wonderful Heist | Belphegor | TV movie |
| 2022–2025 | The Neighborhood | Gregory | 3 episodes |
| 2024 | CSI: Vegas | Dennis Rosner | Episode: "Atomic City" |
| 2026-Present | Stuart Fails to Save the Universe | Barry Kripke | Main role |

== Podcast ==
Podcast
| Year | Title | Role | Notes |
|---|---|---|---|
| 2016 | The Truth: Songonauts | Dr. Staccato | Released in 2016 on SoundCloud |
| 2021 | Household Faces | Host | |
| 2022 | Grimcutty | Host | |
