= Mitch Silpa =

American actor

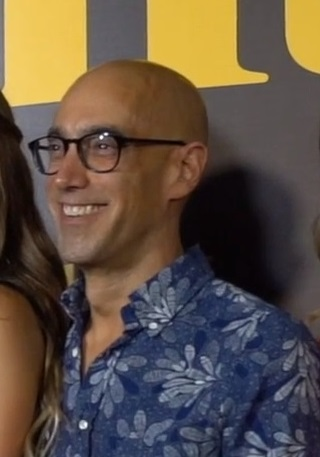
- Silpa from Runt Premiere New York 2021
- Born: December 5, 1971 (age 54); Los Angeles, California, U.S.
- Occupations: Writer, director and actor
- Years active: 1992–present

Mitch Silpa (born December 5, 1971) is an American writer, actor, and director who starred in NBC's The Rerun Show, and has appearances in shows such as Brothers & Sisters, Curb Your Enthusiasm, Desperate Housewives, Gilmore Girls, I'm with Her, One on One, Kitchen Confidential, Reno 911!, Joey, and 2 Broke Girls.

== Early life ==
Silpa was born in Los Angeles, California. He began his career as a member of The Groundlings, an improv and sketch comedy troupe based in Los Angeles. He won over $20K at age 14 in the 80's on a kids' week episode of Card Sharks, and later appeared on a College Week of Scrabble, Shop Til You Drop, and Hollywood Showdown.

== Career ==
Silpa is perhaps best known on the Internet for his David Blaine street magic parodies. In these parodies, Silpa masquerades as an intentionally low-quality likeness of Blaine. Actors Mikey Day and Michael Naughton also appear in these parodies, as best friends Evan and Peter whom Silpa terrorizes with his "magic". He is also known for the "Two Old Queens Who've Just a Minute to Catch Up" viral video series created and performed by Silpa and Drew Droege.

He has had recurring roles on the TV shows All Rise, Chad, Grey's Anatomy, Nobodies, Desperate Housewives, Gilmore Girls, and In Plain Sight. Silpa was a series regular on NBC's The Rerun Show.

Silpa has had guest star roles in sitcoms such as The Comeback, Will & Grace, 2 Broke Girls, The Middle, Reno 911!, and Curb Your Enthusiasm. Although known for a more mature sense of humor, Silpa also acts in television shows that are for a younger audience such as I'm In the Band, on Disney XD and iCarly on Nickelodeon. Silpa plays more serious roles like the character Deputy Everhardt in the television drama In Plain Sight.

As for big screen appearances, one of Silpa's more notable characters is a flight attendant named Steve in the 2011 comedy film Bridesmaids. He appeared in Spy, The Heat, The Way Out, Happytime Murders, Welcome to Me, Unforgettable, and The Boss.

He created, wrote, and produced (with Jim Cashman) the Fox pilot Amy's Brother starring Michael Urie and Annie Mumolo. Silpa has been nominated for a Writers Guild of America Award for his work on Saturday Night Live.

== Personal life ==
He is gay.

== Filmography ==
=== Film ===
Year	Title	Role	Notes
1988	Hell on the Battleground	Soldier #2	
2002	The Master of Disguise	Henchman	
2004	Along Came Polly	J.C. Superstar Director	
2008	Sizzle: A Global Warming Comedy	Mitch	
2011	Bridesmaids	Flight Attendant Steve	
2012	Love, Sex and Missed Connections	Derek	
2013	The Heat	Dealer	
2014	Such Good People	Oliver	
2014	Welcome to Me	Derek	
2015	Spy	Colin / Frederick	
2016	Hickey	Terry	
2016	The Boss	Guard Clemmons	
2017	Unforgettable	Dinner guest	
2018	The Happytime Murders	Tommy	
2019	Runt	Mr. Talley	
2019	Loners	Frank Wilson	
2022	The Way Out	Dale	

=== Television ===
Year	Title	Role	Notes
2002	The Rerun Show	Various roles	7 episodes
2003	The Mullets	Director	Episode: "Love Freakin' Story"
2003	Reno 911!	Hotel clerk	Episode: "Garcia's Anniversary"
2003, 2004	Gilmore Girls	Terrence	2 episodes
2004	I'm with Her	Naked man	Episode: "Winners & Losers & Whiners & Boozers: Part 1"
2004	Joey	Tim	Episode: "Joey and the Perfect Storm"
2004	Malcolm in the Middle	Bartender	Episode: "Kitty's Back"
2005	The Bad Girl's Guide	Balding Guy in Mercedes	Episode: "The Guide to Procrastination"
2006	One on One	Blane	Episode: "Missing the Daddy Express"
2006	Freddie	Jaques	Episode: "Recipe for Disaster"
2006	The Other Mall	Jean store rep	Television film
2006	Kitchen Confidential	Alfredo	Episode: "Praise Be Praise"
2006–2007	Desperate Housewives	Jerry	3 episodes
2007	Case Closed	Brothel DJ	Television film
2008	Brothers & Sisters	Quinn	Episode: "Compromises"
2008	iCarly	Doctor	Episode: "iStage an Intervention"
2008	Night Writer	Lou	Television film
2009	Electric Spoofaloo	Kiko	Episode: "Lady Gaga's Fierce Factor"
2009	Curb Your Enthusiasm	Salesman	Episode: "Officer Krupke"
2010	I'm in the Band	Jimmy Howard	Episode: "Izzy Gonna Sing?"
2011	In Plain Sight	Deputy Everhardt	2 episodes
2011	2 Broke Girls	Jeffrey	Episode: "And the Pop-Up Sale"
2013	Ben and Kate	Patrick	Episode: "Gone Fishin'"
2013	Another Period	Marquis de Sainsbury	Episode: "Pilot"
2013	The Client List	Delivery Man	Episode: "Whatever It Takes"
2014	My Gimpy Life	George	Episode: "Viral Superstar"
2014	The Middle	Todd	Episode: "The Wonderful World of Hecks"
2014	Go-Go Boy Interrupted	Rich	Episode: "How to Exit Gracefully After a One Night Stand"
2014	Anger Management	Mr. Hornsby	Episode: "Charlie Plays Hide and Go Cheat"
2015	Cougar Town	Mobster	Episode: "This One's for Me"
2016	Comedy Bang! Bang!	'Baretta' Producer	Episode: "Gillian Jacobs Wears a Gray Checkered Suit and a Red Bow Tie"
2016	Con Man	Head of Marketing	Episode: "Gum Drop"
2016–2017	Mike Tyson Mysteries	Various roles	3 episodes
2017	Will & Grace	Maitre D'	Episode: "A Gay Olde Christmas"
2017, 2018	Grey's Anatomy	Tim Ruggles	2 episodes
2017–2018	Nobodies	Ethan	12 episodes
2018	Rel	William	Episode: "Brittany's Mom"
2019–2023	All Rise	DDA Clayton Berger	10 episodes
2020	Crazy in Love	Arthur	2 episodes
2022	Classified	Larry	Television film
