= With Special Guest Lauren Lapkus =

Comedy podcast

- Genre: Comedy, improv, talk
- Language: English

Cast and voices
- Hosted by: Lauren Lapkus

Production
- Production: Earwolf Media
- Length: 60–120 minutes

Publication
- No. of episodes: 170
- Original release: November 21, 2014
- Provider: Earwolf
- Updates: Weekly

Related
- Website: Earwolf show page

With Special Guest Lauren Lapkus is an improvisational comedy podcast hosted by Lauren Lapkus where each week the guest is the host. Lapkus takes the guest role in each episode, allowing her guest host to decide the podcast's title, subject matter, and Lapkus's character. Regardless of the host, each episode of the podcast ends with a segment called "Help Me Rhonda", where Lapkus's recurring character Traci Reardon gives advice to her Twitter followers.

== History ==
In 2012, Lapkus began making guest appearances on several podcasts on the Earwolf network, such as Comedy Bang! Bang! and improv4humans. In 2014, Earwolf approached Lapkus to host her own show and they signed her to a two-year contract. She explained, "Eventually they came to me and said, 'Do you want to do a podcast and what would you do?' I think it was just part of becoming a part of the family slowly over time".

The idea for the podcast's theme came from Lapkus's dislike of hosting things. In an interview with Jezebel, she described her thought process as "Oh, I want to do it, but I don't like hosting. That makes me feel weird and I don't want to interview people." Together with her husband, she came up with the concept of always being the guest.

When the podcast launched, Lapkus would come up with her own character in advance, but after a few episodes she decided it would be more cohesive to let the guest host decide her character and not tell her until they were recording. This forces her to improvise on the spot.

Lapkus has said that she "never expected to get into podcasts at all" and it is funny to her that she has one.

== Episodes ==
=== 2014 ===
No.	Title	Guest host	Lapkus's character	Original release date
1	"Public Domain"	Paul F. Tompkins	Traci Reardon	November 21, 2014
2	"The Betsy Podcast"	Betsy Sodaro	Amanda Calzone	November 28, 2014
3	"Movers and Schaffer with Nip Schaffer"	Nip Schaffer (Paul Brittain)	Patti Dukakis	December 5, 2014
4	"Rad Dad Padcast with Terry Dew"	Terry Dew (Brendan Jennings)	Miss Harmony Moongloss	December 12, 2014
5	"Sister Speak with Sheila and Margo"	Sheila & Margo (Mary Holland & Erin Whitehead)	Brandon Shorts	December 19, 2014
6	"The Skip Hardaway Show"	Skip Hardaway (Brian Shortall)	Darla Sherles	December 26, 2015

=== 2015 ===
No.	Title	Guest host	Lapkus's character	Original release date
7	"It's Not Just Magic"	Rick Glassman	Damien Forceright	January 2, 2015
8	"Healthy You"	Kate Berlant	Rachel Rachel-Stoyd	January 9, 2015
9	"The Dr. Phil/Victor Ramos Show"	Dr. Phil McGraw (Horatio Sanz)	Traci Reardon	January 16, 2015
10	"The Wild Horses Show"	Various Improv Characters (Stephanie Allynne, Mary Holland, Erin Whitehead)	Various (Improv)	January 23, 2015
11	"Life's Miracles with Allen Carp"	Allen Carp (Allan Loeb)	Dr. Marianne Kind	January 30, 2015
12	"T.G.I.G.O.T.G.OST"	Sean Clements & Hayes Davenport	Tanya Yavichi	February 6, 2015
13	"The Tom Leykis Radio Program"	Tom Leykis (James Adomian)	Pamela from Big Bear (Caller)	February 13, 2015
14	"Talking with Tommy"	Thomas Middleditch	Renaissance Woman Barbara Preen	February 20, 2015
15	"The Candy Lawrence Show"	Candy Lawrence	Diane Swanson	February 27, 2015
16	"The Sweet Sound of Success with Max Success Champion"	Max Success Champion (Mort Burke)	Macy Champion	March 6, 2015
17	"Me 2 I'm Talkin' U2 To U Too"	Andy Daly	Amoeba Records employee Allison Gondry	March 13, 2015
18	"Split Ends with Trey Felt"	Trey Felt (Drew Tarver)	Hair Stylist Craigory James	March 20, 2015
19	"A Lil' Dab'll Do Ya"	Dabney Coleperson (Scott Aukerman)	Singer/Songwriter Regina Crimp	March 27, 2015
20	"Jillian Palmer Arbonne Podcast"	Jillian Palmer (Stephanie Allynne)	Jade Palmer	April 3, 2015
21	"NBA on NPR"	NBA Stars Bill & Phil (Casey Feigh & Dave Theune)	NBA Insider, The Gooch	April 10, 2015
22	"The California Supreme WinShow"	Aaron Toblerone (Joe Wengert)	Darren Toblerone	April 17, 2015
23	"Best Friends Podcast"	Amanda Sitko & Jennie Pierson	Amanda & Jennie's Assistant Karen	April 24, 2015
24	"Ideas with Glenn Michaels"	Glenn Michael (Nick Thune)	Renowned Inventor Heidi Melon	May 1, 2015
25	"Down and Dirty with Dr. Doug"	Dr. Doug (Nick Kroll)	Various Callers	May 8, 2015
26	"Bad Religion"	Gil Stanley (Gabe Liedman)	"Real Blind God from Outer Space" Lala ALoLo	May 15, 2015
27	"Wild Horses II: Garden Party"	Various Improv Characters (Stephanie Allynne, Mary Holland, Erin Whitehead)	Various (Improv)	May 22, 2015
28	"Second Chances"	Donald Faulter (Ben Schwartz)	Indian Acrobat Salmy McFurt	May 29, 2015
29	"Sunshine and Smiles from Rolling Hills"	Del LaRue (Kyle Dunnigan)	Lucy Anderson	June 5, 2015
30	"Film Chat"	Adalwolf Ditmar (Brendon Small)	AFI Board of Directors Head	June 12, 2015
31	"Chick Chat"	Bishop Gertrude Steinham (Cameron Esposito)	Miss Sarah Lawrence	June 19, 2015
32	"Living Sober with Rory"	Rory (Mike Castle)	Skip Rollins	June 26, 2015
33	"The North Pod"	Santa Claus (Paul F. Tompkins)	Ho Ho the Naughty Elf	July 3, 2015
34	"Down in the Valley"	Mary Toliver (Zoe Jarman)	Businesswoman Jane-Anne Silvestri	July 10, 2015
35	"Turing Tests with Caleb Smith"	Caleb Smith (Matt Besser)	Machine AI "Melissa"	July 17, 2015
36	"Past Pen Pals Present"	Danny Sexton (Neil Campbell)	Alice-Ann Meyers	July 24, 2015
37	"Crossing Swords"	Eleanor Churchwallace Boyd Foster (Suzi Barrett)	Local Advocate/Poet Jill Traci	July 31, 2015
38	"The Midnight Hour"	BeeBee Bloo (Eugene Cordero)	Janet	August 7, 2015
39	"Mary Mary, On the Contrary, How Does Your Garden Grow?"	Mary McMahon (Pam Murphy)	Plant Psychic Diana Van	August 14, 2015
40	"Ooh Shit! That's Fashion!"	BeLaShange (Brandon Johnson)	Bebe Bu	August 21, 2015
41	"Celebrity Wow with Tyler LIVE!"	Tyler (John Early)	Riley McDevit	August 28, 2015
42	"Big Grande: Teachers' Lounge"	Keith Padre, Logan Waters, Sam Weatherman, Howard Levi's (Dan Lippert, Drew Tarver, Ryan Rosenberg, Jon Mackey)	Mrs. Linda Fishberg	September 4, 2015
43	"Ghost Calls Close Calls"	Michael Jack-Son (Adam McCabe)	Jeannie Lumpskin	September 11, 2015
44	"Boom Time"	Jerry Branski (James Urbaniak)	Shirley Arielle Giselle Winestock McGinley Rainbow X Harrison	September 18, 2015
45	"The Pickup The Podcast"	Blake Sugar and Dominic DuBois (Chris Alvarado and Dustin Sterling)	Roxie	September 25, 2015
46	"The Sleepover Podcast LIVE"	Melanie Bill, Marsha Godstone, Trixie Cornell (Stephanie Allynne, Mary Holland, Erin Whitehead)	Jill Bill	October 2, 2015
47	"Kid Rock Talk"	Lionel Dalton (Ryan Meharry)	Tiffani Amber-Squeezin	October 9, 2015
48	"For the Love of the Game"	Patti Pon-Pon (Margot Leitman)	Phyllis McCracken	October 16, 2015
49	"Picking and Tricking"	Manny Faldune (Matt Cook)	Nancy Geefs	October 23, 2015
50	"Mountain Tops with the Hope Brothers"	Jeff and Steve Hope (Randy Sklar, Jason Sklar)	Rachel Shift, Diane Shift	October 30, 2015
50.5	"Bonus! Wild Horses: The Perspective with Kate Berlant"	Kate Berlant, Stephanie Allynne, Mary Holland, Erin Whitehead	TBA	November 4, 2015
51	"Dafuqs Da Matter You"	Nicolette Scoppapapalee (Laura Willcox)	Natalie Scoppapapalee	November 6, 2015
52	"Intern Gino Lambardo's Drive Time Radio Show"	Gino Lambardo (Jon Gabrus)	Traci Reardon	November 13, 2015
53	"The Wishing Well"	Skee-Lo (Shaun Diston)	Frank Dorito	November 20, 2015
54	"Trash Talk"	Tony Tushie (Don Fanelli)	Bobby Bobbabushi	November 27, 2015
55	"Land of the Danny Freeman"	Danny Freeman (Nick Vatterott)	Bethany Framboise	December 4, 2015
56	"Sister Oh, Brother!"	Wayne Federman	Blauren Lapkus	December 11, 2015
57	"The Hard Rock Cafe Radio Hour"	Shane Shore-Levine (Gil Ozeri)	Sis Penny	December 18, 2015
58	"The North Pod 2"	Santa Claus (Paul F. Tompkins)	Ho Ho the Naughty Elf and Rudolph	December 25, 2015

=== 2016 ===
No.	Title	Guest host	Lapkus's character	Original release date
59	"Join Me In My Room"	Fiona Bloom (D'Arcy Carden)	Josie Cranston	January 1, 2016
60	"Wine Time with Martha and Margie"	Martha (Betsy Sodaro) & Margie (Toni Charline)	Shelley	January 8, 2016
61	"Inside Hollywood"	Jesse Miller (Andre Hyland)	Dr. Karen Lightfield	January 15, 2016
62	"Shut Up and Pants With Me!"	Linda (Alana Johnston) and Carol (Holly Prazoff)	Yolanda	January 22, 2016
63	"Young People"	Jeff Garlin	Heather	January 29, 2016
64	"Post-Apodcastlypse"	Eliza Skinner	Barbara	February 5, 2016
65	"Ball is Life"	Ronnie Holt (Rick Glassman) & Jerry (Brent Morin)	Tom Hanks	February 12, 2016
66	"The Room Podcast: LIVE from RIOT LA"	Jennifer (Mary Holland), Camellia (Erin Whitehead) & Girl (Stephanie Allynne)	Pill	February 19, 2016
67	"Vision Quest"	Chakie (Drew DiFonzo Marks) and The Sound of Leaves Rustling (James Mastraieni)	Emma Dottie	February 26, 2016
68	"Talk To Power with Mitch Mayhem: LIVE from UCBSunset"	Mitch Mayhem (Paul Scheer)	President Tatiana Montgomery	March 4, 2016
69	"Life On the Fast Lane"	Adam Martinelli aka Diego Dog (Ryan Stanger) and Vince Valvina (Ryan Meharry)	Olive Donkey Sit	March 11, 2016
70	"Dancie's Fancies"	Hugh Dancie (Seth Morris)	Lorena Jennifer Jason	March 18, 2016
71	"Dreams Dreams Dreams"	Claribelle (Alison Rich), Zelda (Jessica McKenna), & Ruth (Nicole Byer)	Derrick Kidman	March 25, 2016
72	"I'm Sorry I've Been Catfishing You"	Kim Plenge (Claudia O'Doherty)	Susie Wainwright	April 1, 2016
73	"Podbury High"	Bill Bines (Will Hines)	Heather Smiths	April 8, 2016
74	"The Gift Suite"	Marla Vanjine (Mo Collins)	Teti	April 15, 2016
75	"People, Places, and Things"	Marcello Chang Bardinewa (Paul W. Downs)	Elaine McKenna Broderick	April 22, 2016
76	"Anonymous Stories From Beautiful People"	Chris Gethard	Anonymous	April 29, 2016
77	"AstroNOTS"	Rick Valentino (Jacob Reed) & Pepper Jalopy (Betsy Sodaro)	Devin Corcorson	May 6, 2016
78	"Philosophical Phun"	Luke Yovatich (Luka Jones)	Helena Strong	May 13, 2016
79	"The Close Up Hollywood Podcast"	Clarissa Bartlett (Laraine Newman)	Miss Amy Darling	May 20, 2016
80	"What Went Wrong?"	Alex Papas (Jason Mantzoukas)	Louise aka Lou Lou	May 27, 2016
81	"I Truly Complimean It"	Bob Holt (Big Dipper)	Kipper Fields	June 3, 2016
82	"Macy's Secret"	Lisa (Erin Whitehead)	Monique	June 10, 2016
83	"Can You Believe It?"	Colleen (Mike Castle) and Margaret (Joey Greer)	Jnny Crg	June 17, 2016
84	"Fixher Upper"	Chap Baines (Don Fanelli) and Joyanna Baines (Laura Willcox)	Victoria Burlap	June 24, 2016
85	"The Worship Hour"	Reverend Dr. Anita Love (Lauren Ashley Smith)	Simone Jones	July 1, 2016
86	"Family Meeting"	Dale Hardon (Casey Feigh) and Miranda Hardon (Mary Holland)	Dana Hardon	July 8, 2016
87	"Wrong Island"	Deb Deraze (Daniel Franzese)	Gloria Benzavega	July 15, 2016
88	"Stockholm Syndrome"	Dennis Palp (Matt Gourley)	Sharla Corbin Contreras	July 22, 2016
89	"The Force Awakens Minute"	Phuck Cumson (Nick Wiger) and Dylan Panini (Mike Mitchell)	Angora Butterman	July 29, 2016
90	"Homeless But Not Speechless"	Richard Rich (Derek Waters)	Sandra Hendrix	August 5, 2016
91	"Breaking Fast"	Todd Nosher (Tim Baltz)	Brittany	August 12, 2016
92	"Actor On Actor"	Asif Ali & George Basil	Carla Butcher	August 19, 2016
93	"Reading Is Living"	Nance Timberline (Cissy Fenwick) & Phillip Lancelot (Anthony Gioe)	Charlize Steinbeck	August 26, 2016
94	"Love, Love, and More Love"	Teresa Loveless (Marcy Jarreau) & Sophia Lovejones (Nicole Byer)	Various Callers	September 2, 2016
95	"Where The Fuck Have You Been?"	Britney St. Clair (Harvey Guillén)	Christina Grande	September 9, 2016
96	"Celebrity Sightings with Jonathan Biting"	Jonathan Biting (Bobby Moynihan)	Mary Assey	September 16, 2016
97	"The Acapodcast"	Mike Mazlowski (Ryan Meharry), Sketch Pazinski (Matt Newell) & Dan "The Tuba" Kozlowski (James Mastraieni)	Sherman Munster	September 23, 2016
98	"When You Wish Upon A Cast"	Handy Bobbit (Adam McCabe) (with Mrs. Bobbit (Jackie Johnson) & Lawrence (Greg Smith))	Little Carol & Smudge DuBois	September 30, 2016
99	"Home for the Holidays"	Abby Joe Dunce (Betsy Sodaro) & Brett Dunce (Dave Theune)	Amy Dunce & Derek	October 7, 2016
100	"Mommy Break"	Debby Thwack (Mary Holland), Maurine Babcock (Erin Whitehead), and Sydney Stool (Stephanie Allynne)	Jill Hart	October 14, 2016
101	"Women's Glib"	Rhonda Kline (Rebecca Drysdale) & Pam Upspring (Suzi Barrett)	Deley Dance	October 21, 2016
102	"Passion of the Christos"	Stefono Christos (Greg Worswick) & Carolina Christos (Heidi Gardner)	Helen Poon-Kinney Gallagher	October 28, 2016
103	"The Larry Jones Show Live at Now Hear This"	Larry Jones (Shaun Diston) and Carl (Phil Augusta Jackson)	Jenny	November 4, 2016
104	"Generations"	Rosalie Gardenia-House (Paul F. Tompkins) & Buttercup (Scott Aukerman)	Rogers	November 11, 2016

=== 2017 ===
No.	Title	Guest host	Lapkus's character	Original release date
105	"The Kettle Bros."	Andrew Martinis (Eugene Cordero) & Johnny Rocky Horror (Ryan Stanger)	J-Pow Dejacomo	March 10, 2017
106	"Space Cadets"	Molly Buttress (Mary Holland), Sheila Petuni (Erin Whitehead) & Debbie Chord (Stephanie Allynne)	Mission Specialist Becca	March 17, 2017
107	"I Am Bride"	Evelyn Chanel (Laura Willcox)	Annabelle Tool	March 24, 2017
108	"Who Charted?"	Howard Kremer & Kulap Vilaysack	Hannah Kremer	March 31, 2017
109	"The Rambling Man with Calvin Redding"	Calvin Redding (Mike Hanford)	Cynthia Bartlett & Various Callers	April 7, 2017
110	"The Hayam Cast"	Ronna and Beverly (Jessica Chaffin & Jamie Denbo)	Dominique	April 14, 2017
111	"Under the Underground"	Todd Frank (John Ross Bowie)	Melissa Tovey	April 21, 2017
112	"Deep Deep Deep Dark Secrets"	Sherry Sarandon (Cate Freedman)	Tiffany Stenandon	April 28, 2017
113	"The Etique-cast"	Harnold Palmer (Bryan Safi) & Rita Teresa (Erin Gibson)	Roberta "Bobby" Bell	May 5, 2017
114	"The Straight Poop"	Margo Margo (Christine Lakin)	Victoria Conch	May 12, 2017
115	"The Lunch Hour"	Chucky Spliff (Mary Holland)	Joey "The Sink" Mulroney	May 19, 2017
116	"Science and Us"	Herm Furgler (Joey Greer)	Tony Hurder & Claire Stein	May 26, 2017
117	"Five, Six, Seven, Great!"	Joyce Ninton Calcutta (Drew Droege)	Cecily Teak	June 2, 2017
118	"Money, Boogers, and Stuff"	Brian O'Dwier (Matt Walsh) & Paul Uzak (Brian Huskey)	Rinada Giogine	June 9, 2017
119	"Hot Lunch"	Shirley Winsome (Kimmy Gatewood) & Taran Creamer (Rebekka Johnson)	Britney Sloane, Nurse Winsome, Lunch Lady Nancy, Kendrick & Brad	June 16, 2017
120	"Dreams, What Do They Means?"	Ian Neeson (Mike Castle)	Randy & Various Callers	June 23, 2017
121	"The Complete Woman"	Marabel May (Amanda Lund) & Mother (Matt Gourley)	Georgina	June 30, 2017
122	"Camp Wony Pony's Weekly Wrap-Up Podcast"	Ralpha (Adam McCabe), Tabitha (Betsy Sodaro), Alpha (Ryan Stanger), Cynthia (Toni Charline), Ricky (Jacob Reed), Markisa (Ryan Meharry), & Goop (Dave Theune)	Scarene	July 7, 2017
123	"Chasing the High"	Kimmy Tamagini (Arden Myrin)	Emily Abernathy Jones	July 14, 2017
124	"Sex and the City"	Samantha Jones (Erin Whitehead), Miranda Hobbes (Stephanie Allynne) & Charlotte York (Mary Holland)	Carrie Bradshaw	July 21, 2017
125	"My Boyfriend Broke Up With Me"	Kellyanne (Danielle Schneider) and Tracy (Casey Wilson)	Veronica Taylor	July 28, 2017
126	"Hey Misters DJ"	DJ Backsplash (Jessica McKenna) and DJ Crown Molding (Zach Reino)	DJ Zalander	August 4, 2017
127	"Why Ma? Why Ma! Weimar"	John Tortorro (Sean Conroy)	Rose Marie Tortorro	August 11, 2017
128	"The Tonic of Wilderness"	Grahamjer Hyde (Kelly Hudson) & Len Chord (Dan Klein)	Margaret Stone	August 18, 2017
129	"Nannies, Nannies, Nannies"	Felicity Foster (Beth Dover)	Mark, Maria & Marla Maples	August 25, 2017
130	"Drama vs. Drama"	Burt Lamps (Will Hines) & Caulfield Burgerman (Anthony King)	Julia Silversmith	September 1, 2017
131	"Totally Gash"	Elizabeth Laime	Margo Saint	September 8, 2017
132	"Glam Gab"	Susi Snodgrass Meyers (Jackie Johnson)	Stephanie Wetley	September 15, 2017
133	"Do You Remember?"	Tommy Columbo (Henry Zebrowski)	Julie Christmas	September 22, 2017
134	"Republic of Gilead Radio"	Commander Matt (Matt Besser)	Offjack	September 29, 2017
135	"Parenting Made Easy"	Becky (Beth Stelling)	Kay Roberts	October 6, 2017
136	"Getting Comfy"	Rebecca (Jessica St. Clair) & Tatum (Lennon Parham)	Kinsey Riperton, Jose Cuervo and Paula Poundstone	October 13, 2017
137	"The NeighBooHood Watch"	Nancy Camelhoe (Stephanie Allynne), Shirley Crotch (Mary Holland) & Cecile Taint (Erin Whitehead)	Bonnie Butthole	October 20, 2017
138	"The North Pod: The Christmas Before Halloween"	Santa Claus (Paul F. Tompkins)	Ebony & Ho Ho the Naughty Elf	October 27, 2017
139	"Long Term Love"	Marilyn Bamford (Maria Bamford)	Hayden aka Rainbow	November 3, 2017
140	"Talking On the Dock"	John Hodgman	Margery Deacon	November 10, 2017
141	"Falling Out"	Christian Furnow (Jimmy Fowlie)	Tori Dillon and Eileen Furnow	November 17, 2017
142	"T.G.I.G.O.T.G.OST 2"	Sean Clements & Hayes Davenport	Dave Bautista, Bradley Cooper, Zoe Saldaña, Chris Pratt, James Gunn, Patty Jenkins & Jason Momoa	November 24, 2017
143	"Where's Don?"	Carol Henderson (Katie O'Brien) & Junies Beaties (Katy Colloton)	Sheila	December 1, 2017
144	"Wild Horses: The Perspective - Mike Mitchell, Nick Wiger"	Mike Mitchell, Nick Wiger, Mary Holland, Erin Whitehead, Stephanie Allynne	Various	December 8, 2017
145	"Sports Snack"	LaDarrell McMasters (Carl Tart) & Swann Jones (Zeke Nicholson)	John Morton	December 15, 2017
146	"What Makes You Tick?"	Sandra O'Donell (Kate Berlant) & Sandra O'Leary (John Early)	Symphony	December 22, 2017
147	"Get A Grips"	Chris Singleman (Jon Mackey), Nate Marriedman (Dan Lippert), Chuck Betweensituations (Ryan Rosenberg) & Brad Justfriends (Drew Tarver)	Nancy Carrymen	December 29, 2017

=== 2018 ===
No.	Title	Guest host	Lapkus's character	Original release date
148	"Unlikely Fan"	Heather Anne Campbell	Meryl Streep, Judi Dench & Cate Blanchett	January 5, 2018
149	"Unpacking the Wolf"	Lobo (Jon Gabrus) & Lou (Betsy Sodaro)	Trish "The Dish" Weber	January 12, 2018
150	"Wild Horses Live at Largo"	Conan O'Brien, Mary Holland, Erin Whitehead & Stephanie Allynne	Various	January 19, 2018

=== 2019 ===
No.	Title	Guest host	Lapkus's character	Original release date
151	"Miss America's Runners Up"	Diana Poot (Mary Holland)	Kayla Cream	May 10, 2019
152	"Cumberbatch Crawlers vs. St. Cloud Harps"	Shem Creek (Paul F. Tompkins)	Ty Richardman	May 17, 2019
153	"The Proph-cast"	Jeremiah Jeremiah and Isaiah Wiseman (Matt Ingebretson and Jake Weisman)	Jesus Christ	May 24, 2019
154	"Sweet Nothings"	Jean Villepique	Judith Turhune	May 31, 2019
155	"Music for Listening on BBC Radio1"	Willett Graham and Queen P. (Mike Castle and Joey Greer)	Dom Fulch	June 7, 2019
156	"Sister, Sister, Sister, Sister - An Under The Sea Podcast"	Aquata, Andrina, and Arista (Mary Holland, Erin Whitehead, Stephanie Allynne)	Attina	June 14, 2019
157	"The Daily Docent"	Glorio Bubbly (Bryan Safi)	Johnette	June 21, 2019
158	"Chess Indeed"	Lisa Sweetzer-Montgomery (Hayley Huntley)	Donna Van Peet	June 28, 2019
159	"Dialects"	Celeste Barber	Betty Andrews	July 5, 2019
160	"MARSHALLS, MARSHALLS, MARSHALLS!"	Marina Tormei (Santina Muha)	Teresa Van Horn	July 12, 2019
161	"Jam Sesh"	Tit (Alyssa Limperis) and Sue (Maggie Widdoes)	Barbie	July 19, 2019
162	"Psychic Psychat"	Laura Willcox	Karen	July 26, 2019
163	"The Boys Club for Men"	Walter Peacock James (Shaun Diston)	Jason Wilcox	August 1, 2019
164	"Heaven or Heck?"	Charles Brosningham (Scott Aukerman) and Bill Cross (Paul F. Tompkins)	Indira Crutch	August 9, 2019
165	"Try Again"	Ted Wynackabe (Jimmy Fowlie)	Various	August 16, 2019
166	"The Promcast"	Gus "The Bus" Stevenson (Kevin Bartelt) and Andy Chen (Yusong Liu)	Maggie Harrison	August 23, 2019
167	"Astronaut Talk"	Dougie (Colton Dunn)	Linda Mupps	August 29, 2019
168	"Lovin' My Cruise"	Craig (Jon Mackey), Ttttt (Drew Tarver), and Robert (Dan Lippert)	Kimberly Jennings	September 6, 2019
169	"KittyCast PodCat"	Princess Elizabeth Pawpads (Eliza Skinner)	Scooter	September 13, 2019
170	"Toni Baloney's Ladies Night"	Toni Baloney (Ego Nwodim)	Traci Reardon and Angela	September 20, 2019
