= Tom Gunderson =

American animal trainer

- Occupations: Animal trainer at Birds and Animals Unlimited
- Years active: 1996–present

Tom Gunderson is an American animal trainer. He is known for providing animals for film and television productions. His best-known trained animal is Crystal the Monkey, who is a 32-year-old Capuchin monkey. In 2012, Gunderson worked with the television production of Animal Practice, which utilized the services of Crystal the Monkey in a prominent role. Tom made an appearance with Betty Thomas and Crystal the Monkey on the Howard Stern show on 23 June 1998.
