= Lauren Lapkus =

American actress and comedian

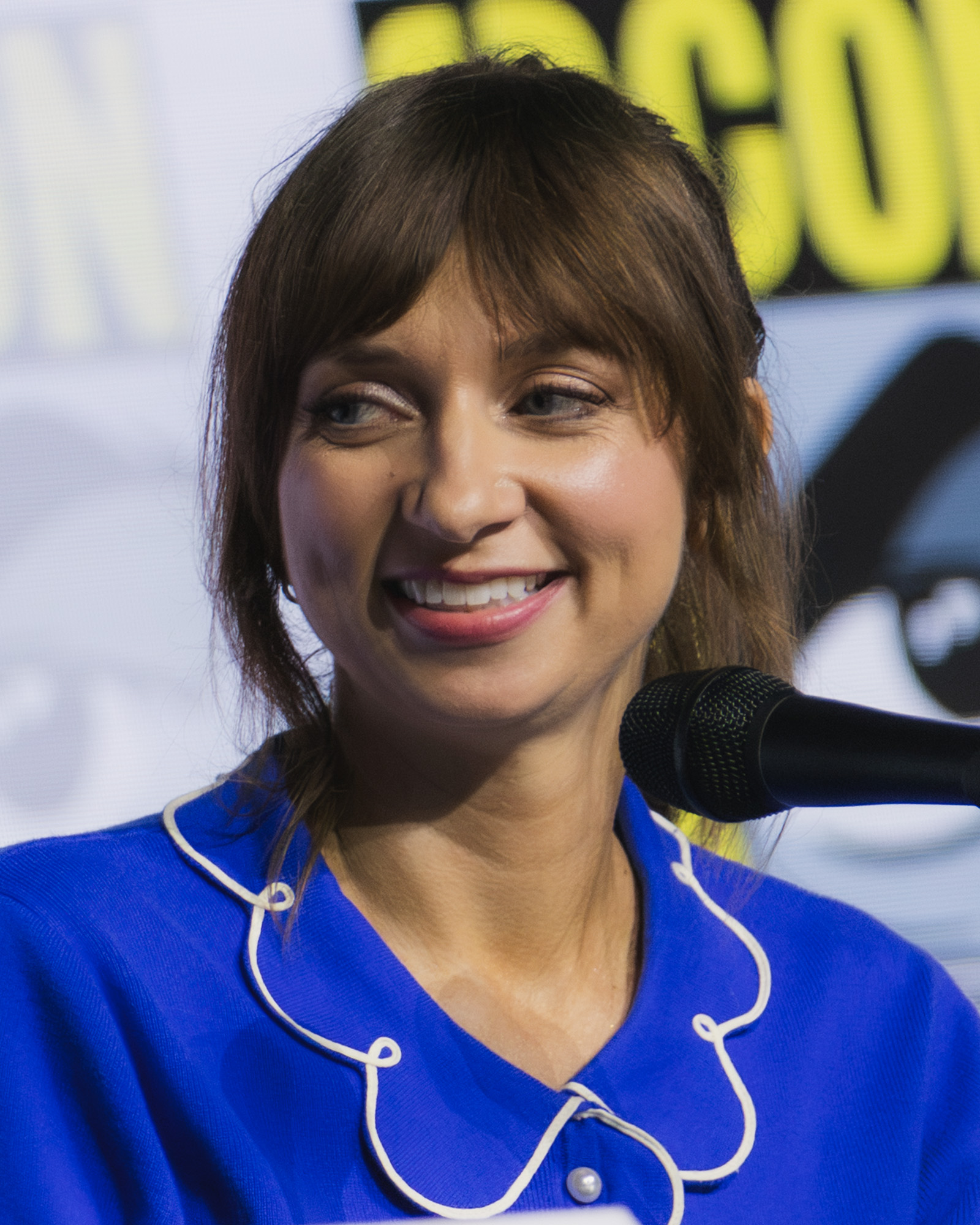
- Lapkus in July 2026
- Born: Dorthea Lauren Allegra Lapkus; September 6, 1985 (age 41); Evanston, Illinois, U.S.
- Education: Evanston Township High School; DePaul University
- Occupations: Actress, comedian
- Years active: 2005–present
- Known for: Orange Is the New Black; The Big Bang Theory; Crashing; Stuart Fails to Save the Universe
- Spouses: Chris Alvarado (m. 2014; div. 2016) Mike Castle (m. 2018)
- Children: 2
- Website: laurenlapkus.com

Dorthea Lauren Allegra Lapkus (born September 6, 1985) is an American actress and comedian, known for portraying Susan Fischer in the Netflix comedy-drama series Orange Is the New Black (2013–2014, 2019), Denise in The Big Bang Theory (2018–2019) and Stuart Fails to Save the Universe (2026–present), and Jess in the HBO comedy-drama series Crashing (2017–2019). She has also appeared in the television series Are You There, Chelsea? (2012), Hot in Cleveland (2012), Clipped (2015), and Good Girls (2020–2021) and in the films Jurassic World (2015), The Unicorn (2018), and The Wrong Missy (2020). She played the voice role of Lotta in the animated comedy series Harvey Girls Forever! (2018–2020).

Lapkus has appeared on various podcasts, including Comedy Bang! Bang!, improv4humans, and her own podcasts With Special Guest Lauren Lapkus, Laptime with Lauren Lapkus, Threedom, Raised by TV, and Newcomers.

== Early life ==
Dorthea Lauren Allegra Lapkus was born on September 6, 1985, in Evanston, Illinois, a suburb of Chicago. She has Greek and Lithuanian ancestry. At an early age, she filmed sketches with her older brother and later at Evanston Township High School where she participated in the annual student revue and variety show YAMO.

During her senior year of high school, she began taking improvisational theatre (improv) classes at the iO Theater. She attended DePaul University graduating in 2008 with a degree in English, while she continued performing improv most nights. Lapkus credits watching many television sitcoms and Saturday Night Live while young for inspiring her to become a comedian.

== Career ==
After almost a year in Los Angeles, Lapkus began landing roles in a number of commercials, including Snickers and Jack in the Box as well as a sketch on Jimmy Kimmel Live! From these successes, she acquired representation, and during pilot season, she landed a supporting role in the short-lived sitcom Are You There, Chelsea?.

After self-taping her audition, Lapkus was cast as correctional officer Susan Fischer on the first and second seasons of the Netflix series Orange is the New Black. In 2015, Lapkus and the cast won the Screen Actors Guild Award for Outstanding Performance by an Ensemble in a Comedy Series.

Lapkus launched her own podcast With Special Guest Lauren Lapkus on the Earwolf network in 2014. Each week her guest is a host of their own podcast, and she appears as a character on their show. Her guests have included Paul F. Tompkins, Betsy Sodaro, Andy Daly, Nick Kroll, and Scott Aukerman. She has said that she "never expected to get into podcasts at all," and to her it is funny she has one.

In mid-2014, Lapkus was cast in the feature film Jurassic World, which she filmed in both Hawaii and New Orleans. Many of her scenes with Jake Johnson were improvised. In 2015, she portrayed Joy the receptionist in TBS's Clipped. In 2016, Lapkus wrote and starred in her own 30-minute episode of the sketch show Netflix Presents: The Characters. Between 2017 and 2019 Lapkus appeared in the HBO series Crashing in the recurring role of Jess, the main character's ex-wife.

In 2020, Lapkus launched a weekly podcast Newcomers with co-host Nicole Byer on the Headgum podcast network, in which the two friends watch film franchises for the first time and provide commentary on them. The podcast has covered the franchises Star Wars, The Lord of the Rings, Tyler Perry, Fast & Furious, Marvel Cinematic Universe, and Batman franchises. Past guests have included John Gemberling, Demi Adejuyigbe, Paul F. Tompkins, and Betsy Sodaro.

Lapkus performs improv regularly. She is a cast member of Upright Citizens Brigade Theatre (UCB)'s flagship show Asssscat and improv group Wild Horses.

== Personal life ==
Lapkus married actor and improviser Chris Alvarado on May 3, 2014. She announced their separation on February 14, 2016, and they divorced later that year.

Lapkus married actor Mike Castle on October 5, 2018. On May 18, 2021, Lapkus announced that they were expecting a baby girl in the summer. She gave birth to a daughter in July 2021. On December 8, 2023, Lapkus revealed she was expecting another baby girl and announced the following May that she had given birth to a second daughter.

== Filmography ==
=== Film ===
Year	Title	Role	Notes
2005	Movie Boy	Pamela	
2011	Dog DNA		Short film
2011	Secrets, Secrets		Short film
2011	Plastic Heart	Lauren	Short film
2012	Dreamworld	Sushi	
2012	Cleve Dixon: Terrible Detective	Barbara Dietrichson	
2012	Manhattan Mixup	Agent Smith	Short film
2013	3D Printer		Short film
2013	Are You Here	Delia Shepard	
2013	The To Do List	Girl Heckler	
2014	Bread and Butter	Deirdre Newsome	
2014	Blended	Tracy the Babysitter	
2015	Jurassic World	Vivian	
2016	Opening Night	Alex Bean	
2017	Girlfriend's Day	Cardie #2	
2018	The Unicorn	Malory	
2018	Dog Days	Daisy	
2018	Good Girls Get High	Patty	
2018	Holmes & Watson	Millie	
2019	Between Two Ferns: The Movie	Carol Hunch	
2020	The Wrong Missy	Missy	
2020	For Madmen Only: The Stories of Del Close	Lynn	
2020	Happiest Season	Mall Security Crystal	
2020	The Last Blockbuster	Narrator	Documentary film
2022	The Curse of Bridge Hollow	Mayor Tammy Rice	
2023	The Out-Laws	Phoebe King	
2023	Another Happy Day	Joanna	Also executive producer
2026	That Friend		

=== Television ===
Year	Title	Role	Notes
2007	Carpeted Afterhours	Becky	Television film
2010	Jimmy Kimmel Live!	Various roles	2 episodes
2010–2011	The Parent Project	Angie	4 episodes
2011	Video Game Reunion	Luigi's Stalker	3 episodes
2011	The Back Room	Various	2 episodes
2012	Are You There, Chelsea?	Dee Dee	12 episodes
2012	Hot in Cleveland	Oscar	Episode: "A Box Full of Puppies"
2012	Joe, Joe & Jane	Melissa	TV pilot
2013–2014, 2019	Orange Is the New Black	Susan Fischer	14 episodes Screen Actors Guild Award for Outstanding Performance by an Ensemble in a Comedy Series
2013–2016	Comedy Bang! Bang!	Various roles	5 episodes
2013	You're Whole	Ellie	Episode: "Lemonade/Fishing/Cupcakes"
2014	House of Lies	Benita Spire	3 episodes
2014	The Hotwives of Orlando	Bank Rep	Episode: "Staycation"
2014	Friends with Better Lives	Deena	Episode: "The Lost and Hound"
2014	Key & Peele	Marion Glass	2 episodes
2014–2016	Drunk History	Herself / Normal Woman	3 episodes
2015	Kroll Show	Candace	Episode: "The In Addition Tos"
2015	Clipped	Joy	Series regular; 10 episodes
2015–2016	Another Period	Penelope	2 episodes
2015–2017	Penn Zero: Part-Time Hero	Matilda / additional voices	4 episodes
2016	Netflix Presents: The Characters	Various	Episode: "Lauren Lapkus"
2016	Bob's Burgers	Krissy Davis	Voice, episode: "Bye Bye Boo Boo"
2016	Adventure Time	Patience St. Pim / Blue Tranch / Ted	Voice, 5 episodes
2016	TripTank	Clarine	Voice, episode: "TripTank 2025"
2016	The Earliest Show	Samantha Newman	6 episodes Nominated – Primetime Emmy Award for Outstanding Actress in a Short Form Comedy or Drama Series
2016	Hell's Kitchen	Herself	Episode: "Let the Catfights Begin"
2016–2018	Animals.	Various voices	7 episodes
2016–2021	American Dad!	Various voices	8 episodes
2017	Clarence	Lauren / Kim / Square Mom	Voice, episode: "Rock Show"
2017	Bajillion Dollar Propertie$	Nadine	Episode: "A Divided House"
2017	Ginger Snaps	Calista	Voice, 10 episodes
2017	The Guest Book	Sandy	2 episodes
2017–2019	Crashing	Jess	9 episodes
2017–2019	Star vs. the Forces of Evil	Higgs	Voice, 2 episodes
2018	Life in Pieces	Cindy	Episode: "Reading Egg Nurse Neighbor"
2018	Lucifer	Bree Garland / Abel	Episode: "Infernal Guinea Pig"
2018	DIY	Jack	Voice, television film
2018	Nailed It!	Herself	Episode: "Jingle Fails"
2018–2019	The Big Bang Theory	Denise	8 episodes
2018–2020	Harvey Girls Forever!	Lotta	Voice, 52 episodes
2018–2025	Big City Greens	Val, Rich Lady, Bella	Voice, recurring role
2018–2023	Craig of the Creek	Mackenzie	Voice, 7 episodes
2019	Lights Out with David Spade	Herself	Episode: "Wayne Brady, Tim Dillon, Lauren Lapkus"
2020	Who Wants To Be A Millionaire?	Herself (celebrity contestant)	2 episodes; total winnings: $500,000
2020	Rise of the Teenage Mutant Ninja Turtles	Red Fox	Voice, episode: "Sidekick Ahoy"
2020	Corporate	Debby Deberson	Episode: "Good Job"
2020	The George Lucas Talk Show	Herself	Episode: "Revenge of Return of the Jedi"
2020	Animaniacs	Cupcake / Gabriella	Voice, episode: "The Cutening/Close Encounters of the Worst Kind/Equal Time"
2020–2021	Good Girls	Phoebe Donnegan	17 episodes
2020–2021	Close Enough	Quinn / Kristen	Voice, 2 episodes
2020–2024	Star Trek: Lower Decks	Jennifer Sh'reyan	Voice, 10 episodes
2021–2022	Inside Job	Deany	Voice, 2 episodes
2023	History of the World, Part II	Shakespeare Writer	Episode: "I"
2023	A Million Little Things	Mallory	2 episodes
2023	Family Feud	Herself	Episode: "The Rookie vs. The Rookie Feds and Lauren Lapkus vs. June Diane Raphael"
2023	The $100,000 Pyramid	Herself – Celebrity Player	Episode: "RuPaul vs Lauren Lapkus and Steve Schirripa vs Loni Love"
2023	Celebrity Wheel of Fortune	Herself - Contestant	Episode: "Lauren Lapkus, Ego Nwodim and Jeff Ross"
2023–2025	Digman!	Gasolina	Voice, 3 episodes
2024	Yo Gabba Gabbaland!	Lauren the Gardener	2 episodes
2024	It's Florida, Man	Absolute Sociopath	Episode: "Bunnies"
2024	Invincible Fight Girl	Coca	Voice, 3 episodes
2025	Night Court	Belinda	Episode: "Rebound and Down"
2025	Gastronauts	Herself	Episode: "I'll Know It When I Taste It"
2025	St. Denis Medical	Wife	Episode: "Aloha, Everyone"
2025	The Morning Show	Emma	Episode: "The Parent Trap"
2026	Mating Season	Lexi	Voice, 2 episodes
2026	Sofia the First: Royal Magic	Charmsie	Voice, episode: "The Enchanted Lake"
2026–present	Stuart Fails to Save the Universe	Denise	10 episodes

=== Video games ===
Year	Title	Role
2015	Lego Jurassic World	Vivian

=== Podcasts ===
Year	Title	Role	Notes
2012–2023	improv4humans	Various	42 episodes
2012–2026	Comedy Bang! Bang!	Various	60 episodes
2013	The Reality Show Show	Herself	Episode 39: "There Is Ninjas"
2013, 2014	Totally Laime	Herself	Episode 160: "Let's All Pee"; Episode 242: "One Hundred Percent!"
2014	Pop My Culture	Herself	Episode 154: "Lauren Lapkus and Chris Alvarado"
2014	Professor Blastoff	Herself	Episode 175: "Reality TV"
2014, 2017	Who Charted?	Herself	2 episodes
2014–2020	Hollywood Handbook	Herself	4 episodes
2014–2019	With Special Guest Lauren Lapkus	Various (guest)	150 episodes
2015	The Hooray Show with Horatio	Herself	Episode 2: "Cereal"
2015	Gilmore Guys	Herself	Episode 60: "Lorelai Out of Water"
2015	Never Not Funny	Herself	Episode 1615: "Lauren Lapkus"
2015	The Nerdist Podcast	Herself	Episode 692: "Lauren Lapkus"
2015	Thrilling Adventure Hour	Herself	5 episodes
2015	Box Angeles	Herself	Episode 88: "Lauren Lapkus"
2015	The Dead Authors Podcast	Beatrix Potter	Addendum vi: Beatrix Potter
2015	Psychic Pshow with Lauren Lapkus	Host	4 episodes
2015	Sklarbro Country	Herself	Episode 267: "Hump The Gun"
2015–2018	SPONTANEANATION with Paul F. Tompkins	Herself	4 episodes
2015–2019	Wild Horses: The Perspective	Co-host	22 episodes
2015–2021	Will You Accept This Rose?	Herself	16 episodes
2016	You Made It Weird	Herself	Episode 297: "Lauren Lapkus"
2016	If I Were You	Herself	Episode 209: "Friend Group (w/ Lauren Lapkus!)"
2016	The Longest Shortest Time	Herself	Episode 78: "Lauren Lapkus Answers Kids' Unanswerable Questions"
2016	WTF with Marc Maron	Herself	Episode 732: "Lauren Lapkus"
2016	I Was There Too	Herself	Episode 45: "Jurassic World with Lauren Lapkus"
2016–2023	Doughboys	Herself	4 episodes
2017	How Did This Get Made?	Herself	Episode 159: "Sleepwalkers"
2017	Big Grande's Teacher's Lounge	Ms. Smuckers	Episode 9: "Great Grief with Home Economics Teacher Ms. Smuckers"
2017	High and Mighty	Herself	Episode 101: "Raised by TV"
2017	Get Up On This	Herself	Episode 306: "Lauren Lapkus"
2017, 2019	Bitch Sesh	Herself	2 episodes
2017–2019	Raised by TV	Co-host	71 episodes
2018	The Andy Daly Podcast Pilot Project	Various	2 episodes
2018	Womp It Up!	Traci Reardon	2 episodes
2018	Hello from the Magic Tavern	Crystal the Genie	Season 2, Episode 63: "Genie"
2018	Mother May I Sleep With Podcast	Herself	Season 3, Episode 12: "Wicked Moms Club"
2018–2020	Throwing Shade	Herself	3 episodes
2018–present	Threedom	Co-host	173 episodes
2020	Laptime with Lauren Lapkus	Herself/various	48 episodes
2020	Mission to Zyxx	Maxie Wiggs	Episode 415: "Dear Maxie"
2020	Talk Chef	Guest Star	Season 1, Episode 8: "Lauren Lapkus"
2020–2024	Newcomers	Co-host	54 episodes
2024	Tiny Dinos	Herself	1 episode
