= Alan Aisenberg =

American actor and television producer

- Aisenberg in 2026
- Born: March 18, 1993 (age 33)
- Education: Tisch School of the Arts
- Occupations: Actor; television producer
- Years active: 2007–present

Alan Aisenberg (born March 18, 1993) is an American actor and television producer. He is best known for his role as Baxter Bayley on the Netflix original series Orange Is the New Black.

== Life and career ==
Aisenberg was raised in Englewood Cliffs, New Jersey and picked up acting at a Jewish Community Center in Tenafly, New Jersey at a very young age. While attending college at the New York University's Tisch School of the Arts, he co-founded a production company known as Deverge.

Aisenberg made his screen debut in the 2007 horror film Unholy. He later made his television debut in 2008 with a minor role in the Nickelodeon series The Naked Brothers Band before landing roles in a number of films, as well as television series such as Mozart in the Jungle and Inside Amy Schumer. In June 2015, Aisenberg began his recurring role as correctional officer Baxter "Gerber" Bayley on the Netflix comedy-drama series Orange Is the New Black.

On January 29, 2017, Aisenberg and the rest of the cast of Orange Is the New Black won a Screen Actors Guild Award for Outstanding Performance by an Ensemble in a Comedy Series. In October 2017, it was announced that Pop ordered a pilot for Sebastian Wakes Up, an improv comedy series co-created by Aisenberg and produced by Deverge, Aisenberg's production company. Aisenberg co-starred in Second Act, a comedy which was released on December 21, 2018.

== Filmography ==
=== Actor ===
==== Film ====
Year	Title	Role
2007	Unholy	Scotty
2008	Harold	Malcolm
2008	The Longshots	Feather
2010	It's Kind of a Funny Story	Scuggs
2013	The English Teacher	Benjamin Meyer
2018	Second Act	Chase
2020	Irresistible	Evan
2025	A House of Dynamite	White House Staffer #1
2026	A Statement	Mitch Tyson

==== Television ====
Year	Title	Role	Notes
2008	The Naked Brothers Band	Boy in class	1 episode
2014	Red Oaks	Alan	1 episode
2014	Mozart in the Jungle	Sidney	2 episodes
2015	Inside Amy Schumer	Dugan	1 episode
2015–2017	Orange Is the New Black	Baxter "Gerber" Bayley	Recurring role
2018	Blue Bloods	Will Leroy	1 episode
2018	Bull	Blake Lambert	1 episode
2020	Brews Brothers	Wilhelm Rodman	Main role
2021–2022	The Resident	Zach Brooks	Recurring role
2023	The Marvelous Mrs. Maisel	MC	1 episode
2025	Bad Thoughts	Diego	1 episode

=== Producer ===
Year	Title	Notes
2012–2018	Improv Everywhere Originals	Executive producer
2013	We Cause Scenes	Documentary; associate producer
2013–2014	Movies in Real Life	11 episodes
2014	Above Average Presents	1 episode
2015	Musicals in Real Life	1 episode
2016	Thank You, Del: The Story of the Del Close Marathon	Documentary; consulting producer
2016	New York's Funniest	5 episodes
2016	Animal Agent	—N/a
2018	Sebastian Wakes Up	Executive producer
