= Mary Holland =

American actress and comedian

- Born: Galax, Virginia, U.S.
- Occupations: Actress, comedian, writer
- Years active: 2013–present
- Spouse: Matt Newell (m. 2020)
- Children: 1

Mary Holland is an American actress, comedian, and writer.

== Early life ==
Holland was born and raised in Galax, Virginia.

== Career ==
After graduating from college, she began performing at the Upright Citizens Brigade Theatre. She is a cast member of UCB's flagship show Asssscat.

Holland is a member of the comedy improv group Wild Horses, along with Lauren Lapkus, Erin Whitehead, and Stephanie Allynne. In 2022, she made several surprise appearances across the U.S. with the "Ben Schwartz and Friends" long-form improv show.

In 2015, Holland was cast in the Starz series Blunt Talk, playing Shelly Tinkle until the series' cancellation after two seasons. In 2016, she was cast in a recurring role on the HBO series Veep and in the film Unicorn Store. On February 28, 2017, Holland was cast in the ABC comedy pilot Household Name alongside Carol Burnett.

On July 26, 2020, Holland participated in the Sequester: Undercover Mini in which she played as the Lemon. All donations for Holland's participation went to the Black Trans Travel Fund. Also in 2020, she guest starred in the final episode of season ten of Curb Your Enthusiasm. In 2022 she portrayed principal Martha Reiser in Senior Year, a comedy movie produced by Rebel Wilson. The movie received generally negative reviews but Holland's performance was praised. In 2026 Holland was cast in the Netflix series Little House on the Prairie. That August, it was announced that Holland would star as the female lead in the DC Universe series The People v. Gorilla Grodd, alongside Skyler Gisondo as Jimmy Olsen.

== Filmography ==
=== Film ===
Year	Title	Role	Notes
2016	Mike and Dave Need Wedding Dates	Becky	
2017	And Then There Was Eve	Laura	
2017	Unicorn Store	Joanie	
2018	The Package	Triage Nurse	
2019	Greener Grass	Kim Ann	
2019	Good Posture	Pauline	
2019	Between Two Ferns: The Movie	Gerri Plop	
2020	Golden Arm	Melanie	
2020	Happiest Season	Jane Caldwell	Co-writer
2022	Senior Year	Martha Reiser	
2023	Self Reliance	Amy	
2023	Maggie Moore(s)	Maggie Lee Moore	
2024	Doin' It	Linda Smeighton	
2024	Nightbitch	Miriam	
2025	You're Dating a Narcissist!	Barb from Statistics	
2026	That Friend		

Key
†	Denotes films that have not yet been released

=== Television ===
Year	Title	Role	Notes
2013–2016	Comedy Bang! Bang!	Various	6 episodes
2014	Silicon Valley	Sherry	Episode: "Proof of Concept"
2014	The Birthday Boys	Various	Episode: "Cerf's Folly"
2015	Parks and Recreation	Victoria Herzog	Episode: "Ron & Jammy"
2015	The Mindy Project	Mom #1	Episode: "Jody Kimball-Kinney Is My Husband"
2015	Truth Be Told	Amy	Episode: "The Ecosystem"
2015–2016	Blunt Talk	Shelly Tinkle	19 episodes
2016	It's Always Sunny in Philadelphia	Blair	Episode: "Dee Made a Smut Film"
2016	The Good Place	Paula Ouncerock	Episode: "What We Owe to Each Other"
2016	Mr. Neighbor's House	Miss Lady	TV special
2016–2017	The UCB Show	Various	3 episodes
2016–2018	Animals.	Various voices	7 episodes
2017	Michael Bolton's Big, Sexy Valentine's Day Special	Dianne	Variety special
2017	New Girl	Gil	Episode: "Young Adult"
2017	Shrink	Rachel	8 episodes
2017	Brooklyn Nine-Nine	Tricia	Episode: "Moo Moo"
2017	Veep	Shawnee Tanz	5 episodes
2017	Bajillion Dollar Propertie$	Missy	Episode: "A Divided House"
2017	Dice	Trudy	2 episodes
2018	Crazy Ex-Girlfriend	Cat Store Clerk	Episode: "Trent?!"
2018	American Housewife	Ashley Clark	Episode: "Sliding Sweaters"
2018	Mr. Neighbor's House 2	Miss Lady	TV special
2018	Happy Together	Suzanne	Episode: "Pilot"
2018	Fresh Off the Boat	Cindy	Episode: "Cousin Eddie"
2018–2025	Craig of the Creek	Maney (voice)	8 episodes
2019	Speechless	Caroline	Episode: "THE S-T-A-- STAIRCASE"
2019	Abby's	Sharon	Episode: "The Fish"
2020	Curb Your Enthusiasm	Tara Cooper	Episode: "The Spite Store"
2020	Robbie	Janie	8 episodes
2020	Homecoming	Wendy	4 episodes
2020	Star Wars: Jedi Temple Challenge	AD-3 (voice)	10 episodes
2020	Mapleworth Murders	Lanie Delabouche	3 episodes
2020	Hoops	Connie (voice)	8 episodes
2020	The George Lucas Talk Show	Herself	Episode: "Digital Magic"
2020	Big City Greens	Chairwoman (voice)	Episode: "Chipwrecked"
2020–2021	Duncanville	Various voices	4 episodes
2020–2023	Harley Quinn	Jennifer, Tabitha (voice)	3 episodes
2021–2022	Physical	Tanya Logan	4 episodes
2021–2023	HouseBroken	Various voices	3 episodes
2022	The Woman in the House Across the Street from the Girl in the Window	Sloane	Limited series; Main cast
2022–2024	Star Trek: Lower Decks	Toz, Moxy, Dr. Helen Gibson (voice)	3 episodes
2023	History of the World, Part II	Typhoid Mary	Episode: "VII"
2023	The Afterparty	Nicole	Episode: "Aniq 2: The Sequel"
2023–2024	The Big Door Prize	Nat	16 episodes
2024	Bob's Burgers	Maryanne, Helen Oats (voice)	2 episodes
2024–2026	Ghosts	Patience	Recurring role (seasons 4–5); 9 episodes
2025-2026	Beavis and Butt-Head	Various (voice)	6 episodes
2026	Little House on the Prairie	Jemma James	
TBA	The People v. Gorilla Grodd †	Sandra	Main role; Filming
