= Kimia Behpoornia =

American comedian and actress

- Born: February 1, 1992 (age 34); Los Angeles, California, U.S.
- Occupations: Comedian, actress
- Notable work: Unicorn Store, Abby's, Reboot, Abbott Elementary, Atypical
- Spouse: Hailey Chavez (m. 2022)
- Father: Jay Behpoornia

Kimia Behpoornia is an American comedian and actress. She is best known for her performances in Unicorn Store, Abby's, Reboot, Abbott Elementary and Atypical.

== Early life ==
Behpoornia was raised in Los Angeles. Her parents immigrated to the United States from Iran. She began improvising in elementary school and was later a member of Second City Los Angeles' Teen Troupe. Behpoornia attended college at UCLA.

== Career ==
She has improvised at theaters in Los Angeles including ComedySportz LA, Upright Citizens Brigade, and Westside Comedy Theater.

Behpoornia gained wider prominence for her performance in Brie Larson's film Unicorn Store. She was a main cast member on the series Abby's. She also acted in series Good Trouble, Hacks, Atypical, Lucifer, Reboot, and the film My Divorce Party. She frequently appears in Dropout series such as Make Some Noise and Very Important People. She was a recurring cast member in season 3 and a guest cast member in season 5 of Abbott Elementary as Emily, one of Janine's new coworkers at the school district. She is a voice actor for the PBS animated series City Island.

In 2024, she starred as a main character in the ABC pilot Forgive & Forget. She is a co-star in the upcoming horror comedy feature film Best Friends Forever.

== Personal life ==
Behpoornia is queer, and has been married to Hailey Chavez since 2022.
