= Brews Brothers =

2020 American comedy streaming television series

- Genre: Sitcom
- Created by: Greg Schaffer
- Starring: Alan Aisenberg; Mike Castle; Carmen Flood; Marques Ray
- Music by: Scott Doherty
- Country of origin: United States
- Original language: English
- No. of seasons: 1
- No. of episodes: 8

Production
- Executive producers: Jeff Schaffer; Greg Schaffer; Keith Quinn; Jonathan Stern
- Producers: Franny Baldwin; David Soldinger
- Cinematography: Patrick Stewart
- Editors: George Mandl; Colin Johnson
- Camera setup: Single-camera
- Running time: 26–30 minutes
- Production companies: Abominable Pictures; Schaffer Brothers Productions

Original release
- Network: Netflix
- Release: April 10, 2020

Brews Brothers is an American sitcom that was created by Greg Schaffer. The series was released on April 10, 2020 on Netflix.

== Cast and characters ==
=== Main ===
- Alan Aisenberg as Wilhelm Rodman, the owner and brewmaster of Rodman's Brewing Company in Van Nuys, California
- Mike Castle as Adam Rodman, Wilhelm's pretentious brother
- Carmen Flood as Sarah, the underage manager at Rodman's Brewing Company who used to be MMA fighter and has a cauliflower ear due to an injury
- Marques Ray as Chuy, another employee at Rodman's Brewing Company who used to be an auto body mechanic

=== Recurring ===
- Zach Reino as Elvis, a co-owner of the "Kids Menu" food truck which is parked outside of Rodman's Brewery
- Inanna Sarkis as Becky, the other co-owner of the "Kids Menu" and Elvis's girlfriend
- James Earl as Matt, a member of Rodman's Brewery's Founders Circle
- Mike Mitchell as Jack, another of Rodman's Brewery's Founders Circle
- Flula Borg as Truffle, a monk from the monastery in Belgium who Wilhelm connected with
- Amber Chardae Robinson as Elaine

== Episodes ==
No.	Title	Directed by	Written by	Original release date
1	"The Brothers Rodman"	Jeff Schaffer	Greg Schaffer	April 10, 2020
2	"Recreate the Opus"	Jeff Schaffer	Greg Schaffer	April 10, 2020
3	"Taste of Van Nuys"	Natalia Anderson	Hunter Covington & Stacy Traub	April 10, 2020
4	"Monk Monday"	Jeff Schaffer	Greg Schaffer	April 10, 2020
5	"LA's Best Nose"	Annabel Oakes	Steve Joe	April 10, 2020
6	"Lazlo Suna"	Robert Cohen	Greg Schaffer	April 10, 2020
7	"Krachtbal"	Robert Cohen	Steve Joe	April 10, 2020
8	"The Trink"	Dale Stern	Greg Schaffer	April 10, 2020

== Production ==
=== Development ===
On August 23, 2019, it was announced that Netflix had given the production a series order for a first season consisting of eight episodes. The series was created by Greg Schaffer who was also expected to executive produce alongside Jeff Schaffer, Jonathan Stern, and Keith Quinn. The series premiered on April 10, 2020.

=== Casting ===
Alongside the initial series announcement, it was reported that Alan Aisenberg, Mike Castle, Carmen Flood, and Marques Ray were cast as series regulars.

== Reception ==
On Rotten Tomatoes, the series holds an approval rating of 40% based on 10 reviews, with an average rating of 4/10. The website's critics consensus reads, "Brews Brothers has its moments, but predictable plotting and uneven humor make the whole brew fall flat." On Metacritic, it has a weighted average score of 44 out of 100 based on 5 reviews, indicating "mixed or average reviews".
