= Unicorn Store =

2017 film by Brie Larson

- Official release poster
- Directed by: Brie Larson
- Written by: Samantha McIntyre
- Produced by: Brie Larson; David Bernad; Terry Dougas; Ruben Fleischer; Lynette Howell Taylor; Paris Kassidokostas-Latsis
- Starring: Brie Larson; Samuel L. Jackson; Joan Cusack; Bradley Whitford; Karan Soni; Mamoudou Athie; Mary Holland; Hamish Linklater
- Cinematography: Brett Pawlak
- Edited by: Jennifer Vecchiarello
- Music by: Alex Greenwald
- Production companies: Rhea Films; The District; Rip Cord Productions; Sycamore Pictures; Hercules Film Fund; 51 Entertainment
- Distributed by: Netflix
- Release dates: September 11, 2017 (TIFF); April 5, 2019 (United States)
- Running time: 92 minutes
- Country: United States
- Language: English

Unicorn Store is a 2017 American comedy fantasy film directed, co-produced by and starring Brie Larson (in her feature film directorial debut). The cast also includes Samuel L. Jackson, Joan Cusack, Bradley Whitford, Karan Soni, Mamoudou Athie, Mary Holland and Hamish Linklater.

It premiered during the Special Presentations section at the 2017 Toronto International Film Festival and was released on April 5, 2019, by Netflix. The film received mixed reviews with critics praising the performances and Larson's potential as a filmmaker while some lamented the screenplay as too "immature" and "whimsical".

== Plot ==
Kit, a failed artist, moves back in with her parents and takes a temp job at a PR agency. At work, Kit meets the vice president, Gary, who is extremely awkward and makes inappropriate advances.

Shortly after starting, Kit receives a mysterious letter from "the Salesman" who invites her to "the Store" that sells "what you need." He offers to fulfill her childhood fantasy of owning a unicorn. Kit must prepare by meeting specific requirements.

The first requirement is to provide an adequate unicorn living enclosure. Kit hires Virgil, a hardware store employee, to build a stable without telling him what for. Soon, they begin to talk and spend time together. The second requirement is to prepare to feed the unicorn. Kit and Virgil buy hay on a day trip together and further get to know each other.

Gary offers Kit an opportunity to present a vacuum cleaner marketing pitch. During this time, Kit receives the next requirement and learns she must be able to surround the unicorn with a loving environment but realizes her poor relationship with her parents prevents this.

On the weekend that Kit should be preparing her work presentation, she goes on an "Emotion Quest" wilderness trip with her parents, confronting them during the "truth circle" time, leading to a family discussion. They end up arguing, furthering tensions between her and her parents.

Once Kit returns home, she finds inspiration for her presentation and works all night. The next requirement is that she can financially support the unicorn.

Kit's flamboyant presentation is not well received by the business executives, who watch in stunned silence. They unanimously opt for a different pitch, using an attractive model. Kit leaves/gets fired from her job. On a date with Virgil, he asks her to reveal the secret of the stable's purpose. Kit tells him about the unicorn store, bringing him to it, only to find it is gone. Kit's confusion turns to anger as she feels betrayed. Virgil becomes concerned, telling her that she's been conned, but assuring her that he doesn't think she's crazy. Kit exits angrily, leaving Virgil standing there, where he sees some hay on the ground.

Kit gives up on her dream of owning a unicorn and throws out all of her childhood art and supplies. After a healing moment with her mother, Kit tries to reach out to Virgil and visits his store, but he is not there. She leaves an apologetic message on his voicemail, and later finds that Virgil has finished the stable, decorating it with the artwork that she had thrown out.

The Salesman calls to tell Kit the unicorn has arrived. When she hesitates, the Salesman tells her there is another person waiting if Kit doesn't get it. Virgil urges Kit not to go. Despondent, Kit says if she doesn't go, she will always wonder. When she arrives, Kit finds the unicorn is actually there. She talks to the unicorn, thanking him when he was there for her when nobody else was, and finally gains closure. She decides not to take the unicorn with her and leaves it for the next customer. Virgil comes in and sees the unicorn as well. They leave hand-in-hand, astonished at all they had just experienced.

== Cast ==
- Brie Larson as Kit
  - Leila Pieroni as young Kit
- Samuel L. Jackson as The Salesman
- Joan Cusack as Gladys
- Bradley Whitford as Gene
- Mamoudou Athie as Virgil
- Hamish Linklater as Gary
- Martha MacIsaac as Sabrina
- Karan Soni as Kevin
- Annaleigh Ashford as Crystal
- Mary Holland as Joanie
- Nelson Franklin as Aaron
- Chris Witaske as Matt
- Ryan Hansen as Brock
- Kimia Behpoornia as Britney
- Emily Robinson as Karen
- Cody Sullivan as Spencer
- Susan Park as Angie

Various crew members appear in brief roles, including: writer Samantha McIntyre as Sam, a woman also seeking a unicorn; composer Alex Greenwald as a ninja; production designer Matt Luem as Jonathan Scott, Kit's art professor; and executive producer Nathan Kelly as David Davidson Jr. Toks Olagundoye and Jack J. Yang cameo as Scott's fellow art professors.

== Production ==
Larson had previously auditioned to be in the film but failed to get the part, but five years later was invited to come on board as director.

Principal photography began in November 2016, in Los Angeles, California and concluded on December 9, 2016.

== Release ==
The film had its world premiere at the Toronto International Film Festival on September 11, 2017. On January 9, 2019, it was revealed that Netflix picked up the distribution rights. It was released on April 5, 2019.

== Reception ==
On Rotten Tomatoes, 66% of critics have given the film a positive review based on 94 reviews, with an average rating of 5.96/10. The site's critics consensus reads, "It'll be best enjoyed by audiences with a high tolerance for colorful whimsy, but Unicorn Store is easy to like — and it suggests Brie Larson has a future behind the camera." Metacritic assigned the film a weighted average score of 44 out of 100 based on reviews from 16 critics, indicating "mixed or average reviews".

Clarisse Loughrey of The Independent gave it a positive review, praising its "earnest emotion" and "joyous celebration of femininity." Leah Greenblatt of Entertainment Weekly rated it "B", and called it "A candy-coated, willfully quirky wisp of a film; like a Michel Gondry fantasy dipped in glitter and rainbow sprinkles." Tim Grierson of Screen International wrote "Both skewering and celebrating its adult protagonist's childlike wonder, Unicorn Store runs the risk of excessive whimsy at every turn. But Larson navigates through a cute story's clear limitations to deliver a film that's often quite funny." Tim Grierson of Screen International writes: Both skewering and celebrating its adult protagonist's childlike wonder, "Unicorn Store" runs the risk of excessive whimsy at every turn. But Larson navigates through a cute story's clear limitations to deliver a film that's often quite funny.

Peter Debruge from Variety was critical of the film, saying it fails to create the right tonal balance, and labeled it "a creative misfire". IGN's Kristy Puchko gave the film 4.3 out of 10, and stated "Despite all the magic, unicorns, and glitter, there's not much fun or whimsy to Unicorn Store. Its wonder is punctured by Kit's perpetually prickly attitude. Its humor is dulled by Larson's incoherent comedy stylings."
