= Golden Arm (film) =

2020 American comedy film by Maureen Bharoocha

- Theatrical release poster
- Directed by: Maureen Bharoocha
- Screenplay by: Ann Marie Allison; Jenna Milly
- Produced by: Geeta Bajaj
- Starring: Mary Holland; Betsy Sodaro; Dot-Marie Jones; Kate Flannery; Olivia Stambouliah; Dawn Luebbe; Ron Funches; Eugene Cordero; Ahmed Bharoocha; Aparna Nancherla
- Cinematography: Christopher Messina
- Edited by: Grant McFadden
- Music by: Hannah Parrott
- Production companies: No. 8 Films; The Ranch Productions
- Distributed by: Utopia
- Release dates: October 15, 2020 (Milwaukee Film Festival); April 30, 2021 (United States)
- Running time: 90 minutes
- Country: United States
- Language: English

Golden Arm is a 2020 sports comedy film directed by Maureen Bharoocha and written by Ann Marie Allison and Jenna Milly. It stars Mary Holland, Betsy Sodaro, Dot-Marie Jones, Kate Flannery, Olivia Stambouliah, Dawn Luebbe, Ron Funches, and Eugene Cordero.

It was originally set to premiere at the 2020 South by Southwest festival, which was cancelled due to the COVID-19 pandemic. The film was released by Utopia in select theaters and on demand on April 30, 2021.

== Plot ==
A struggling baker in a small town takes her friend's advice to train for the Ladies Arm Wrestling Championship and its prize of $15,000.

== Cast ==
- Mary Holland as Melanie
- Betsy Sodaro as Danny
- Dot-Marie Jones as Big Sexy
- Kate Flannery as Randy
- Olivia Stambouliah as Brenda
- Dawn Luebbe as Tessie
- Ron Funches as Carl
- Eugene Cordero as Greg
- Ahmed Bharoocha as Jerry
- Aparna Nancherla as Coco Cherie

== Reception ==
On the review aggregator website Rotten Tomatoes, 100% of 19 critics' reviews are positive, with an average rating of 7.3/10.
