= Crystal the Monkey =

Capuchin monkey actor (born 1994)

Crystal
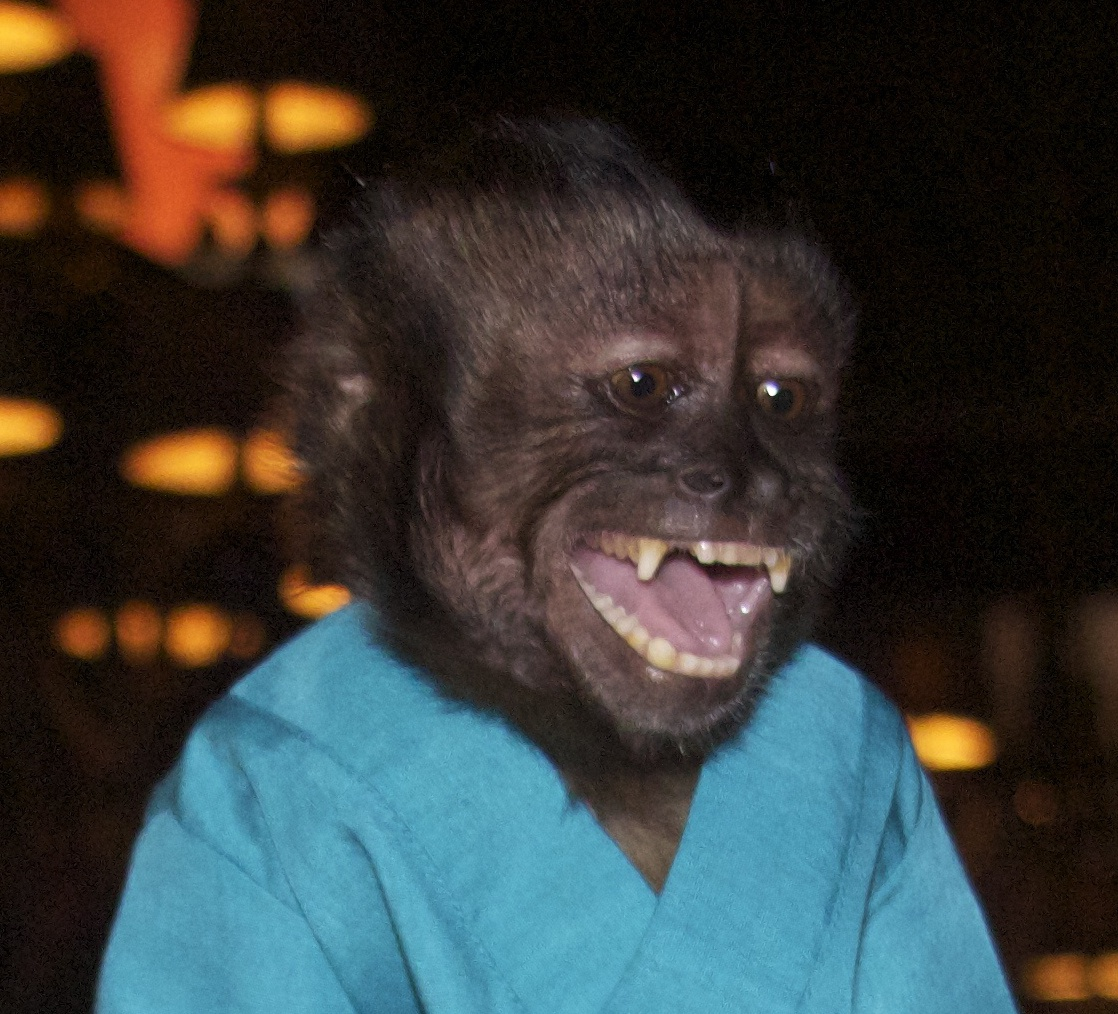
- Crystal the Monkey at the 2012 San Diego Comic-Con
- Species: Tufted capuchin (Sapajus apella)
- Sex: Female
- Born: May 6, 1994 (age 32); California, United States
- Occupation: Actress
- Years active: 1997–present
- Owner: Tom Gunderson
- Residence: Los Angeles County, California
- Height: 1 ft 7 in (48 cm)

Crystal (born May 6, 1994) is a female tufted capuchin and animal actress, acquired and trained by Birds & Animals Unlimited, Hollywood's largest supplier of animals. Her acting career began as a baby monkey in Disney's 1997 film George of the Jungle. She has portrayed the monkey Dexter in the Night at the Museum franchise, a drug-dealing monkey in The Hangover Part II, and pet monkey Bennie in Steven Spielberg's 2022 semi-autobiographical film The Fabelmans. In 2012, she played Dr. Rizzo on the sitcom Animal Practice.

== Acting career ==
=== Universal Studios ===
In 1996, Birds & Animals Unlimited, the largest furnisher of animals to Hollywood, sent one of its trainers to purchase a capuchin monkey in Florida. Birds & Animals prefers to begin training younger monkeys, optimally those close to one year old. Audacious two-and-half-year-old Crystal, whose canine teeth had begun showing, was offered. The trainer ultimately decided to buy Crystal and two younger capuchin monkeys as well. Three employees received the three monkeys. Crystal was given to Tom Gunderson, an employee who had only been with the company for a few years and had been primarily working at Universal Studios Florida's Animal Actors stage show. Gunderson had let the other two employees select their monkeys first and was left with the oldest, Crystal. He named her Crystal, a namesake to a country music singer Crystal Gayle. New York magazine's Benjamin Wallace wrote, "It was like she was born to perform."

Gunderson and Crystal worked together for eight years at the Animal Actors stage show. Because the show was marked by pyrotechnics and noisy, cheering audiences, Gunderson said it was "a boot camp" and "a great way for a monkey to grow up and become habituated for this kind of environment". Unlike the majority of monkeys who were bothered by high volume music and children, Crystal was remarkably mature. Rather than destroy a stuffed animal as any other monkey would do, she preferred to groom herself and work the levers of a child's activity center.

=== Television and film ===
Having appeared in over 20 films by 2011, Crystal first starred in the 1997 film George of the Jungle. Wallace of New York magazine said her Internet Movie Database page is "more hit-studded than most actors three times her age", and Joe Flint of the Los Angeles Times called her "a veteran of movies and TV with an enviable IMDB credit list". USA Today called Crystal "Hollywood's Hottest Monkey" and the Los Angeles Times called her the most powerful pet in Hollywood".

She is known for her roles in the 2006 film Night at the Museum and its sequels, Night at the Museum: Battle of the Smithsonian (2009) and Night at the Museum: Secret of the Tomb (2014), playing troublesome monkey Dexter (also playing another character, Able, in the second film). In the 2009 film, her character slapped Ben Stiller, while her trainer encouraged her with "Get him! Get him! Hit him harder! Hit him harder!" Stiller joked that "I really dislike the monkey. There's no way to feel great about having a monkey slap your face on any level." During filming, Crystal in an "unscripted moment" relieved herself on Robin Williams, who was playing Teddy Roosevelt. Williams said, "It combines the worst aspects of working with children and animals when you have an animal that looks like a child ... Plus, what human can [defecate] on you in the middle of a scene and people would be like 'Awww, great'".

She has done cameos with David Hasselhoff in the 2011 film Hop and with Ken Jeong in the NBC comedy series Community. She made a special appearance on Community's panel at San Diego Comic-Con in July 2011.

She portrayed a drug dealing monkey in the 2011 film The Hangover Part II. Director Todd Phillips raised concerns after he joked that Crystal had become addicted to cigarettes after learning to smoke them for the film. Philips later explained that Crystal never actually held a lit cigarette on the film's set, the smoke was added digitally in post-production, and the cigarette was ceramic. Still, PETA protested Crystal's appearance in the film because the studio used exotic animals for entertainment purposes and because the film does not carry the American Humane Association's disclaimer that "no animals were harmed" since the group was denied set visits. Ken Jeong, Crystal's fellow actor in The Hangover Part II, Community, and Zookeeper, praised her, saying, "She's amazing. She's not a monkey, she's an actor. And quite possibly the best actor I've worked with."

In 2011 she played Donald the Monkey in the Frank Coraci-directed film Zookeeper and was voiced by Adam Sandler. Crystal also played Crystal the Capuchin in the Cameron Crowe-directed film We Bought a Zoo.

After gymnast Gabby Douglas' gold medal-winning performance at 2012 Summer Olympics individual all-around, NBC aired a commercial of Crystal swinging on gymnastic rings. Wallace of the magazine New York called it a "cringe-worthy juxtaposition" that sparked much debate about racism on Twitter. Sportscaster Bob Costas had just said, "There are some African-American girls out there who tonight are saying to themselves: 'Hey, I'd like to try that too.'" Crystal's ad had been broadcast three times previously and was a promotion for NBC's upcoming sitcom, Animal Practice.

She played Dr. Rizzo, a crony of misanthropic veterinarian Dr. George Coleman in Animal Practice, a sitcom that debuted on September 26, 2012. Before the show was cancelled due to low ratings, Crystal netted her owner $12,000 per episode; the earnings from nine episodes meant that for the year she made more than twice as much as the average Hollywood actor. New York's Wallace observed the filming of a scene in which Crystal gives Coleman a shoulder massage. Gunderson used gestures to coax Crystal to perform the desired action and let her lick yogurt from his fingers upon finishing. After each scene, Gunderson rewards her with a treat. Wallace noted that her favorite treats included "chocolate, Nutella, grapes, pistachios, peanuts, the odd crafts-services banana, a weekly egg for protein, and, off-set, spiders and flies".

In 2019, Crystal appeared as a security guard in the Hindi-language Bollywood film Total Dhamaal. In 2022, she appeared in Steven Spielberg's semi-autobiographical film The Fabelmans as Bennie, the pet monkey of the titular family.

== Personal life ==
Crystal lives with her trainer, Tom Gunderson, in Los Angeles County, California. Other animals live in the home, "including dogs, horses, a cat, and another female capuchin, named Squirt." Crystal, who sleeps no less than eight hours every day, shares a mattress with Gunderson, his wife, fellow capuchin Squirt, and a chihuahua.

== Filmography ==
Year	Title	Role	Notes
1997	George of the Jungle	Monkey	
1998	Dr. Dolittle	Drunk Monkey	
1999	American Pie	Monkey with garage band	
2000	Terror Tract	Bobo	
2001	Dr. Dolittle 2	Drunk Monkey	
2002	Malcolm In The Middle	Oliver the Helper Monkey	Episode: "Monkey"
2004	Garfield: The Movie	Pet monkey	
2005	Fun with Dick and Jane	Test monkey	
2006	The Shaggy Dog	Capuchin	
2006	Night at the Museum	Dexter	
2006	Failure to Launch	Forest Monkey	
2007	3:10 to Yuma		
2009	Night at the Museum: Battle of the Smithsonian	Dexter, Able	
2010–2013	Community	Annie's Boobs	5 episodes
2011	The Hangover Part II	Drug Dealing Monkey	Credited as Crystal; Nominated – Teen Choice Award for Choice Movie Female Scene Stealer
2011	The Big Bang Theory	Ricky the Smoking Monkey	
2011	Zookeeper	Donald the Monkey	Voiced by Adam Sandler
2011	We Bought a Zoo	Herself	
2012	Treasure Buddies	Babi	
2012	Animal Practice	Dr. Rizzo	
2013	The Good Thing	Herself	
2013	The Hangover Part III	Monkey	Post credit scene
2014	All Hail the King	Bar Monkey	
2014	Night at the Museum: Secret of the Tomb	Dexter	
2015	Russell Madness	Hunk	
2016	Monkey Up	Monty	
2016	Legends of the Hidden Temple	Mikey the Monkey	Television film
2016	The 101-Year-Old Man Who Skipped Out on the Bill and Disappeared	Erlander	Swedish film
2016	Gibby	Gibby	Lead role
2018	MAX - "Worship"	Monkey	
2019	Total Dhamaal	Prachi's friend/Security guard	Bollywood film, Hindi debut
2022	The Fabelmans	Bennie the Monkey	
2024	Bad Monkey	Driggs	TV show

== See also ==
- List of individual monkeys
