= Clipped (TV series) =

American sitcom

- Genre: Sitcom
- Created by: David Kohan; Max Mutchnick
- Directed by: James Widdoes
- Starring: Mike Castle; Ashley Tisdale; Lauren Lapkus; Ryan Pinkston; Matt Cook; Diona Reasonover; George Wendt
- Opening theme: "Just Getting Started" by Hawk Nelson
- Country of origin: United States
- Original language: English
- No. of seasons: 1
- No. of episodes: 10

Production
- Executive producers: David Kohan; Max Mutchnick; James Widdoes
- Producer: Steve Gabriel
- Camera setup: Multi-camera
- Running time: 21 minutes
- Production companies: KoMut Entertainment; Warner Horizon Television

Original release
- Network: TBS
- Release: June 16 – August 18, 2015

Clipped is an American sitcom that aired on TBS from June 16 to August 18, 2015. The series stars Mike Castle and Ashley Tisdale and centers on a group of co-workers who all went to high school together but ran in very different crowds. Now they find themselves working together at Buzzy's, a barbershop. On October 23, 2015, TBS canceled the series after one season.

== Premise ==
Clipped takes place in a Charlestown, Massachusetts barbershop called Buzzy's, named after the original owner (George Wendt) who still works there. The shop's new owner is Ben (Ryan Pinkston), an unpopular student during high school who now finds himself in charge of some formerly more popular classmates. These include AJ (Mike Castle) and Danni (Ashley Tisdale), who once dated each other and who are both chasing bigger dreams. AJ was a star pitcher on the school's baseball team and still hopes to play professionally, while Danni is an aspiring singer. The rest of the staff consists of Ben's best friend Mo (Matt Cook), sarcastic stylist Charmaine (Diona Reasonover), and perpetually cheerful receptionist Joy (Lauren Lapkus).

== Cast ==
- Mike Castle as A.J. Salerno
- Ashley Tisdale as Danni Giordano
- Lauren Lapkus as Joy
- Ryan Pinkston as Benjamin Herschel "Ben" Grossman
- Matt Cook as Mo McCracken
- Diona Reasonover as Charmaine Eskowitz
- George Wendt as Buzzy

=== Recurring ===
- Crista Flanagan as Rhonda Doyle
- Dana Powell as Robin Doyle
- Lisa Schurga as Rosalee Doyle
- Betsy Sodaro as Rita Doyle
- C.J. Vana as Lonnie, Ben's cousin
- Skyler Stone as Travis, a sex-crazed man who owns the tattoo parlor next door; he makes advances on Danni, Joy and Charmaine
- Reginald VelJohnson as Tommy, Buzzy's partner and later husband

== Development ==
In May 2013, Turner Broadcasting held its annual upfront presentation. Turner Broadcasting announced it was developing a series on TBS with the working title of Clipsters. With David Kohan and Max Mutchnick as writers and executive producers, the series would be an ensemble workplace comedy that involved an eclectic cast of hair stylists at barbershop in Worcester, Massachusetts.

In April 2014, Turner Broadcasting announced that George Wendt, Ashley Tisdale, and Lauren Lapkus would star in the series. The series was now considered untitled. The series' premise involved a group of former high school students who came from different circles, and now work together at Buzzy's Barbershop in their hometown of Charlestown, Massachusetts. They all long for moving to Boston, but they are making the best of their lives in Charlestown.

On May 6, 2014, TBS, ahead of its upfront presentation in New York, picked up three comedies to series. TBS announced it had greenlit ten episodes. The series was then named Buzzy's.

The series, titled Clipped, premiered on June 16, 2015.

It aired for one season.

== Filming ==
Clipped was filmed at Warner Bros. Studios in Burbank, California but it is set in Charlestown, Massachusetts.

== Episodes ==
No.	Title	Directed by	Written by	Original release date	Prod. code	US viewers (millions)
1	"Pilot"	James Widdoes	David Kohan & Max Mutchnick	June 16, 2015	296034	1.42
A.J. gets a call from his sports agent to join a major league baseball team thinking that his days as a barber are over. Citing an insurance rate increase, Ben pressures one of the barbers to quit, but makes them decide among themselves whom it will be.
2	"Dreamers"	James Widdoes	David Kohan & Max Mutchnick	June 23, 2015	2M6852	1.28
Danni tells A.J. to give up his dream of playing professional baseball, and be more realistic about his life choices. In contrast, Danni revives her dream of singing, performing the song "Brave" at the local bar, despite telling everyone that she had given up on music. Meanwhile, Joy's involvement in an AIDS Walk brings up the issue of charity, when Ben hires Lonnie, his mentally-challenged cousin, to work at the barbershop for free. Soon, Ben's guilt over not paying his cousin starts to get to him.
3	"Go Below"	James Widdoes	David Kohan & Max Mutchnick	June 30, 2015	2M6853	1.09
Danni suspects that A.J. and Charmaine are a couple after hearing about their private study sessions for a Spanish class that they are taking. Charmaine correctly guesses that Danni's suspicions are caused by unresolved romantic feelings that she has for A.J. Ben has a one-night stand with Rita and regrets it the day after, but is annoyed to hear that Rita also regrets it. Meanwhile, Joy tries to figure out why Buzzy is so resentful of the Catholic church.
4	"Wi-Fi"	James Widdoes	David Kohan & Max Mutchnick	July 7, 2015	2M6854	1.10
In failing to convince Ben to get Wi-Fi back in the barbershop, Danni, Charmaine, and Joy each try to convince Travis, a perverted tattoo artist in the shop next door, to give up his Wi-Fi password. Mo accidentally tells everyone that Ben is being urinated on at a fitness gym shower by a fellow business owner, with A.J. enjoying the fact Ben is getting a comeuppance.
5	"Big Gay Wedding"	James Widdoes	John Quaintance	July 14, 2015	2M6857	1.02
Tommy's mother dies, which opens the door for Buzzy to propose to Tommy. Buzzy had promised that when Tommy's mother died he would propose, given that Tommy's mother thought they were just roommates. However, when Buzzy expresses second thoughts about going through with the wedding, Charmaine takes Buzzy's side and convinces him that he shouldn't get married for the wrong reasons. This leads to Charmaine and Danni discussing the true meaning of marriage. Meanwhile, Ben shuns Mo's opinions about a possible merger between the barbershop and Travis' tattoo shop, which causes Mo to become irritated over always being Ben's sidekick. Also, Joy becomes highly stressed planning Buzzy and Tommy's wedding.
6	"World's Rudest Barbershop"	James Widdoes	David Kohan & Max Mutchnick	July 21, 2015	2M6858	1.19
Videos of Charmaine treating customers rudely go viral, causing Ben to fire her. But when dozens of customers call the next day and ask for an appointment with Charmaine, Ben sees there is a market for people who enjoy being treated badly. He rehires Charmaine in an effort to rebrand Buzzy's as "The World's Rudest Barbershop". Meanwhile, Mo is guilt-ridden upon breaking A.J.'s pitching arm while practicing judo, but later helps A.J. discover a hidden talent.
7	"Mo's Ma"	James Widdoes	Steve Gabriel	July 28, 2015	2M6856	1.26
When Mo's mother Dottie (Dot-Marie Jones) announces she is getting divorced, the gang assumes it's because she's gay and Ben has to break the news to Mo gently. But the crew is in for a surprise. Meanwhile, AJ suspects Danni may be jealous of his date Lucy (Natalie Dreyfuss).
8	"The Gambler"	James Widdoes	David Kohan & Max Mutchnick	August 4, 2015	2M6855	1.33
Tommy suspects Buzzy's old gambling problems have resurfaced; the same problems that forced him to sell the barbershop to Ben. Joy hints to Mo that her marriage is in trouble and that "someone else" may be the right man for her. Meanwhile, Danni and Charmaine get the Doyle sisters styled up for a family wedding.
9	"Free Wednesday"	James Widdoes	David Kohan & Max Mutchnick	August 11, 2015	2M6859	1.31
Mr. Painter (Larry Miller), a math teacher from the gang's old high school, suffers a heart attack after getting his hair cut and dies. Ben appears unmoved, and the others learn that it is because Mr. Painter was part of a very embarrassing incident in Ben's past. Elsewhere, Joy tells Mo that she is pregnant with her husband Bart's baby, which makes her conflicted because she does not want to stay married to Bart.
10	"Reunion"	James Widdoes	David Kohan & Max Mutchnick	August 18, 2015	2M6860	1.25
The gang attends their high school reunion. Ben learns that the guy who used dirty tricks to beat him out for Junior Class President is now working in a toll booth, and he vows to humiliate him. Danni and A.J. run into C.J., who was Danni's boyfriend until A.J. stole her on prom night. Mo is asked by two former cheerleaders, Debby and Debbie, to join them in leading the attendees in a cheer, but Mo insists they include Charmaine, who did not make the cheerleading team back in school. Meanwhile, Joy chooses to sit in the barbershop with a lonely Lonnie as he waits for a date that may never show, and she misses most of the reunion.

== Critical reception ==
The review aggregator website Rotten Tomatoes reported a 43% approval rating, with a rating average of 6/10, based on 7 reviews. On Metacritic, which assigns a normalized rating, the series has a score of 55 out of 100, based on 5 critics, indicating "mixed or average reviews".

In a positive review, Diane Werts of Newsday awarded the pilot a grade of a B+ and stated, "There's also a lot of craft behind "Clipped." That finally tips the scales in the Turner cable world, where TNT has found success with slick dramas like "Rizzoli & Isles" and "Major Crimes," while comedy sibling TBS more often seems to whiff. Not this time". Similarly, Whitney Matheson of The Hollywood Reporter commended the cast's chemistry: "Clipped’s charm lies in distinctive performances by Lapkus and Cook. Just as Wendt and Tisdale will attract their own admirers, so will these two comedians, whether it’s for Lapkus’ Orange Is the New Black role or the actors' respective podcasts". Conversely, Matthew Gilbert of The Boston Globe criticized the show as "forgettable — if not unpleasant", citing that the elements of "Clipped" might have "resonated and felt fresher" if Will & Grace hadn't preceded it.
