= Nelson Franklin =

American actor (born 1985)

- Born: July 2, 1985 (age 41)
- Occupation: Actor
- Years active: 2005–present
- Children: 1

Nelson Franklin (born July 2, 1985) is an American actor. He is best known for his television roles in The Millers, Traffic Light, The Office, New Girl, Black-ish, Veep, and Yellowjackets.

== Life and career ==
Franklin was born to father Howard Franklin, a screenwriter and director. His stepmother is DJ Anne Litt. Franklin attended high school at Campbell Hall School in Studio City, California. He graduated from New York University Tisch School of the Arts.

Franklin's first major role was a recurring role as Nick, the I.T. worker on NBC's The Office. Franklin later went on to appear as a series regular on the short-lived FOX comedy series Traffic Light. He appeared with another Office actor, David Denman, who played Pam's ex-fiancée Roy. His side projects include a short for Funny or Die: a fake commercial promoting the Dudes-N-Bros Talking Points System, which is a service that helps guys who are not dudes or bros hold a conversation with dudes and bros. He co-starred on the CBS sitcom The Millers and has appeared on the FOX sitcom New Girl, the HBO political comedy Veep, Black-ish, and Abby's. Franklin currently streams video games on the platform Twitch. He was also described as "a guest" on the podcast Scott Hasn't Seen.

== Filmography ==
=== Film ===
Year	Title	Role	Notes
2005	The Funeral	Harold Lafayette	Short film
2005	Berkeley	Frat Prez	
2006	Like Father Like Edison	Doyle	Short film
2008	The Schedule	Tom	Short film
2008	Excision	Patient	Short film
2009	I Love You, Man	Sydney's buddy #2	
2010	Waiting for Forever	Joe	
2010	The Big Dog	Rich	Short film
2010	Scott Pilgrim vs. the World	Michael Comeau	
2011	Answer This!	James Koogly	
2011	Ghost Phone: Phone Calls from the Dead	Will	
2012	Argo	LA Times Reporter	
2013	Jobs	Bill Atkinson	
2017	Band Aid	Ned	
2017	Gemini	Greg	
2017	Battle of the Sexes	TV reporter	
2017	Unicorn Store	Aaron	
2018	A Futile and Stupid Gesture	P. J. O'Rourke	
2018	Puppet Master: The Littlest Reich	Markowitz	
2019	Captain Marvel	Medical Examiner	
2019	Tone-Deaf	York	
2020	Have a Good Trip: Adventures in Psychedelics	Young Lewis Black	
2021	Hero Mode	Rick	
2021	King Knight	Angus	
2021	Sweet Girl	Martin Bennett	
2021	Being the Ricardos	Joe Strickland	
2023	You People	Director	
2024	The Gutter	Some Winner	
2024	Unfrosted	Davey Wilson	
2025	The Napa Boys	Kevin	
2026	Basic	Brick	
2026	The Social Reckoning	Tom	

=== Television ===
Year	Title	Role	Notes
2008–2009	In2ition	Rick	2 episodes
2008–2010	The Office	Graphic Design Guy; Nick	Recurring role; 5 episodes
2009	Party Down	Steve	Episode: "Brandix Corporate Retreat"
2009	Dollhouse	Burt Styne	2 episodes
2009	Canned	Justin	TV movie
2011	The Zombie Whisperer	David	Pilot
2011	Traffic Light	Adam	Main role; 13 episodes
2012	Family Trap	Ben	TV movie
2012–2019	Veep	Will	Recurring role; 19 episodes
2012–2018	New Girl	Robby McFerrin	Recurring role; 18 episodes
2013	Holding Patterns	Chad	TV movie
2013–2018	Arrested Development	Dr. Tilive	Episodes: "A New Start", "Premature Independence"
2013–2015	The Millers	Adam Stoker	Main role; 34 episodes
2014	Hello Ladies: The Movie	Yogurt Director	TV movie
2015	Big Time in Hollywood, FL	Stu	Episode: "To Catch a Paparazzi"
2015	Maron	Joshua	Episode: "Mad Marc"
2015	Truth Be Told	Avi Goldman	2 episodes
2015	Instant Mom	Principal Strick	Episode: "Crimes of Fashion"
2015	Agents of S.H.I.E.L.D.	Steve Wilson	Episode: "Many Heads, One Tale"
2016–2022	Black-ish	Connor Stevens	Recurring role; 40 episodes
2017–2019	I'm Sorry	David	Recurring role; 4 episodes
2019	Abby's	Bill	Main role; 10 episodes
2019	A Million Little Things	Elon	Episode: "Grand Canyon"
2020	Grown-ish	Connor	Episode: "Real Life S**t"
2020	#BlackAF	Nelson	3 episodes
2021	Hacks	Interviewer	Episode: "Interview"
2022	Gaslit	Dick Moore	3 episodes
2022	The Old Man	Dr. Howard	Episode: "I"
2022	Ghosts	Elliot	Episode: "The Liquor License"
2023	Scott Pilgrim Takes Off	Documentarian (voice)	Episode: "Lights, Camera, Sparks?!"
2023	Bookie	Kevin Miller	Episode: "A Square Job in a Round Hole"
2024	Mr. Throwback	Crisis Management Team	Episode: "Eric Roth Costs a Fortune, Bro"
2024	A Man on the Inside	Rick Whuzmarc	3 episodes
2025	Yellowjackets	Edwin	2 episodes
2025	The Vince Staples Show	House Manager	Episode: "Mr. Baldwin"

== Awards and nominations ==
Year	Award	Category	Nominated work	Result
2017	23rd Screen Actors Guild Awards	Outstanding Performance by an Ensemble in a Comedy Series (Dan Bakkedahl, Sufe Bradshaw, Anna Chlumsky, Gary Cole, Kevin Dunn, Clea DuVall, Tony Hale, Hugh Laurie, Julia Louis-Dreyfus, Sam Richardson, Reid Scott, Timothy Simons, John Slattery, Sarah Sutherland, Matt Walsh, and Wayne Wilderson)	Veep	Nominated
2018	24th Screen Actors Guild Awards	Outstanding Performance by an Ensemble in a Comedy Series (Dan Bakkedahl, Anna Chlumsky, Gary Cole, Margaret Colin, Kevin Dunn, Clea DuVall, Tony Hale, Julia Louis-Dreyfus, Sam Richardson, Paul Scheer, Reid Scott, Timothy Simons, Sarah Sutherland, and Matt Walsh)	Veep	Won
