= Irresistible (2020 film) =

2020 American political comedy film written and directed by Jon Stewart

- Official release poster
- Directed by: Jon Stewart
- Written by: Jon Stewart
- Produced by: Dede Gardner; Jeremy Kleiner; Jon Stewart; Lila Yacoub
- Starring: Steve Carell; Chris Cooper; Mackenzie Davis; Topher Grace; Natasha Lyonne; Rose Byrne
- Cinematography: Bobby Bukowski
- Edited by: Jay Rabinowitz; Mike Selemon
- Music by: Bryce Dessner
- Production companies: Busboy Productions; Plan B Entertainment
- Distributed by: Focus Features (United States); Universal Pictures (International)
- Release date: June 26, 2020 (United States)
- Running time: 102 minutes
- Country: United States
- Language: English
- Box office: $371,962

Irresistible is a 2020 American political comedy film written and directed by Jon Stewart. It stars Steve Carell in the lead role, Chris Cooper, Mackenzie Davis, Topher Grace, Natasha Lyonne, and Rose Byrne. The film follows a Democratic strategist who tries to help a candidate win a local election in a small right-wing town. Originally set for a theatrical release in May 2020, the film was delayed due to the COVID-19 pandemic in the United States, and then released on Premium VOD and selected theaters on June 26, 2020, by Focus Features. It received mixed reviews from critics, who called it "a soft political satire".

== Plot ==
Plunged into despair by the results of the 2016 presidential election, veteran Democratic Party campaign consultant Gary Zimmer is shown a viral video of retired Marine Col. Jack Hastings giving a speech in support of the illegal immigrant population of his hometown, the fictional town of Deerlaken, Wisconsin.

Calculating that getting Hastings elected as a Democrat in Deerlaken's upcoming mayoral election will help him convince the American people in the heartland to vote Democrat in the next presidential election, Zimmer travels to Wisconsin to persuade Hastings to run. Arriving in Deerlaken, Gary experiences the vast cultural divide between his home of Washington, D.C., and the townspeople's more rural mannerisms and political beliefs.

Gary soon meets Hastings and his daughter Diana and pitches his idea. Hastings initially declines, considering himself more of a conservative and having no real interest in politics, but later relents and agrees to run under the condition that Gary serve as his campaign manager. Hastings recruits his friends and neighbors as volunteers for the campaign.

However, setbacks soon arise such as limited Wi-Fi, xenophobia, social conservatism, and the fact that the incumbent mayor, Braun, is being funded by the Republican National Committee. The RNC also sends Faith Brewster, Gary's nemesis, to counter Gary.

As the race heats up, Gary takes Jack to NYC so they can recruit funds for the campaign to match Faith's money and resources. Jack gives a powerful speech to the possible donors about how he needs their help for his small town, which inspires Gary. Their donations allow Gary to upgrade their campaigning methods.

Soon the election polls show the two candidates neck-and-neck, although the Hastings campaign takes a dive when one of Gary's team members advertises a pro-contraceptive platform to a group of single women who turn out to be nuns. When Gary starts berating his teammates, Diana convinces him to apologize and that if he is going to run her father's campaign, he needs to be nice.

When it starts to look like Faith and Braun are going to win, Gary tries to convince Jack and Diana to play dirty and start exploiting Braun's skeletons. Diana is horrified that Gary would play dirty and secretly goes to Braun for advice. The two decide to secretly reveal a bigger scandal about Braun so Gary will not go after Braun's brother, which was his original plan. The scandal, however, proves to be false.

On Election Day, almost no one votes (only two votes are cast, with one vote going to each candidate, resulting in a tie), which confuses both Gary and Faith. It quickly becomes clear that the election was actually a setup. Diana reveals she masterminded the entire scheme, filming the video of her father's immigration speech (which was carefully scripted) so that the Democrats and Republicans would pour thousands of dollars into the election; the town has been quietly siphoning the money to get through its financial troubles due to the recent closure of a nearby military base.

Gary is shocked that Diana would play him and she then counters by explaining the town had no choice but to set him up because D.C. politicians play small towns like theirs all the time while doing nothing to help when times are tough. When Gary reveals that he has feelings for Diana, she rejects him, pointing to their age difference.

Later, Diana becomes the mayor of Deerlaken after a special election.

The film ends with three scenes leading into each other, each with its own set of cast credits: Gary and Diana embrace at a construction site for a new public building; until Gary is snapped out of that thought to reveal Gary and Ann, the pastry chef, in bed, discussing plans for a new bakery; until Gary finally snaps out of that to show Gary and Faith kiss and discuss their investment portfolio in their kitchen.

A post-credits scene shows a short interview with Trevor Potter, an official of the Federal Election Commission, discussing the shortcomings of oversight over elections fund-raising. The screen shows the title IRRESISTIBLE fading into the word RESIST.

== Cast ==
- Steve Carell as Gary Zimmer
- Rose Byrne as Faith Brewster
- Chris Cooper as Marine Colonel Jack Hastings
- Mackenzie Davis as Diana Hastings
- Topher Grace as Kurt Farlander
- Natasha Lyonne as Tina De Tessant
- Will Sasso as Big Mike
- C.J. Wilson as Lowell
- Brent Sexton as Mayor Braun
- Alan Aisenberg as Evan
- Debra Messing as Babs Garnett
- Bill Irwin as Elton Chambers
- Bruce Altman as Richard Peeler
- Christian Adam as Michael
- Will McLaughlin as Captain Ortiz
- Jason Vendryes as YAWM
- William Smith as Hofbrau Bar Fly.
- Candy Crowley as herself
- Trevor Potter as himself
- Joe Scarborough as himself
- Mika Brzezinski as herself

== Production ==
It was announced in October 2018 that Jon Stewart was planning his next directorial effort, with Steve Carell in talks to star, contingent on scheduling. In March 2019, Rose Byrne entered negotiations to join the film. That same month, Chris Cooper joined the cast of the film, with Focus Features acquiring distribution rights. In April 2019, Mackenzie Davis, Topher Grace, and Debra Messing joined the cast of the film. Will Sasso, CJ Wilson, Natasha Lyonne, and Alan Aisenberg joined in May. In June 2019, Brent Sexton joined the cast of the film.

Production began in April 2019 In Atlanta, Georgia. Filming took place mostly in Rockmart, Georgia.

== Release ==
The film was released digitally in the United States through Premium VOD, as well as in selected theaters on June 26, 2020. It was originally scheduled for a wide theatrical release on May 29, 2020, but due to movie theater closures that started in mid-March because of the COVID-19 pandemic restrictions, it was cancelled.

The film made an estimated $100,000 from 238 theaters in its domestic opening weekend. It was released in France on July 1, 2020, where it grossed $52,673 from 117 theaters.

== Reception ==
=== VOD sales ===
In its debut weekend, Irresistible was the top-rented film on the iTunes Store and fourth on FandangoNow (although since the service reports totals by the week it was likely first over the three-day frame). In its second weekend the film fell to fourth iTunes and fifth on FandangoNow, but ranked first on Spectrum's weekly chart, then placed sixth on Fandango and 10th on Spectrum the week after that. In October 2020, The Hollywood Reporter said the film was the eighth-most popular PVOD title amid the COVID-19 pandemic.

=== Critical response ===
On review aggregator website Rotten Tomatoes, the film holds an approval rating of 41% based on 227 reviews, with an average rating of 5.5/10. The site's critics consensus reads, "A soft political satire that proves frustratingly less than the sum of its talented parts, Irresistible is anything but." At Metacritic, the film has a weighted average score of 47 out of 100, based on 49 critics, indicating "mixed or average" reviews.

Owen Gleiberman of Variety said that "Irresistible scores points yet feels behind the curve. You wish it were a bold satirical bulletin, or maybe just Stewart's pricelessly amusing version of a Christopher Guest movie. Instead, the film is a lot like a politician: It makes a big show of leading the viewer, but without rocking the boat." David Ehrlich of IndieWire gave the film a "C" and, although praising Byrne's performance, wrote: "A Capra-esque moral comedy that unfolds with all the subtlety of sky writing and none of the same panache, Irresistible is a perverse bid for clarity that feels like it was left behind like a relic from some long-distant past."

The San Francisco Chronicle's G. Allen Johnson called it "perhaps the most lamebrain, ham-fisted and insulting movie of the year".

Mark Kermode gave a fairly positive review of the film in The Guardian, comparing it to Wag the Dog and Local Hero, saying: "there's something reassuringly nostalgic about Irresistible... Stewart is back on home ground, opening with a TV show-style segment about the falsehoods of the 'spin room' ('I look forward to lying to you in the future') that we now take for granted."

== See also ==
- 2016 United States presidential election
- Impact of the COVID-19 pandemic on cinema
