= Betsy Sodaro =

American actress

- Education: Western State College of Colorado
- Occupation: Actress
- Years active: 2010–present

Betsy Sodaro is an American actress. She is a regular performer at the Upright Citizens Brigade Theater in Los Angeles. She is best known for her appearances on comedy programs such as Ghosts, Another Period, Duncanville, Clipped, Animal Practice, Nailed It!, Big Time in Hollywood, FL and the Netflix show Disjointed.

== Life and career ==
Sodaro is originally from Summit County, Colorado, and graduated from Western State College of Colorado in 2006, with a degree in communications and theater. She is the youngest of four sisters. Her father was an English teacher and children's playwright, and she grew up performing in his shows. After graduating, she trained and performed at the Sacramento Comedy Spot and moved to Los Angeles in 2007. She performs regularly at the Upright Citizens Brigade Theatre with house improv teams Bangarang! and Search History and house sketch team Nephew. Sodaro cites Chris Farley among her comedic influences.

Sodaro has been in films such as Monsters University and The To Do List, and has made guest appearances on television shows such as Raising Hope, Comedy Bang Bang, NTSF:SD:SUV::, Stevie TV, and Kroll Show. In 2010, she was a cast member in UCB co-founder Matt Besser's Comedy Central sketch pilot This Show Will Get You High, along with Besser, Brett Gelman, John Gemberling, and Paul Rust. In 2012, Sodaro co-starred in the short-lived NBC sitcom Animal Practice. She also plays recurring roles on the Comedy Central's Another Period and Big Time in Hollywood, FL and co-starred on the TBS sitcom Clipped.

Sodaro is a frequent guest on Matt Besser's podcast improv4humans. She has also guested on many other podcasts on the Earwolf network such as on Comedy Bang! Bang!, Hollywood Handbook, and With Special Guest Lauren Lapkus.

Sodaro also provided the voice of Plant from Warner Bros. Animation's Right Now Kapow, Xixi The Toucan from All Hail King Julien, and many more. She also played the character "Dabby" on the Netflix sitcom Disjointed starring Kathy Bates. Beginning in 2022, Sodaro appeared on Ghosts as Nancy, a ghost who died from cholera. In High on Life, Sodaro voiced Sweezy, a talking alien gun known as a Gatlian. She has been featured as a Demodex mite in a television advertising campaign for Tarsus Pharmaceuticals, Inc.'s XDEMVY since October 17, 2024.

== Filmography ==
Feature films
Year	Title	Role	Notes
2013	Monsters University	Additional voices	
2013	The To Do List	Graduate #2	
2018	Don't Worry, He Won't Get Far on Foot	Powell's Information Person	
2018	Next Gen	Gate	Voice
2019	Plus One	Grumpy Maid of Honor	
2020	Trolls World Tour	Clampers Buttonwillow	Voice
2020	Valley Girl	Tough Bouncer	
2020	An American Pickle	Defense Attorney	
2020	Hubie Halloween	Bunny	
2020	Golden Arm	Danny	
2021	Music	Probation Officer	
2022	The Prank	Mrs. Gutierrez	
2022	Puss in Boots: The Last Wish	Jo Serpent / Baker's Dozen Gang Member	Voices
2023	The Out-Laws	Chef Ida	
2023	Not an Artist	Ranger	
2024	Thelma the Unicorn	Cow / additional voices	Voices
2024	Summer Camp	Vick Cockburn	

Television shows
Year	Title	Role	Notes
2010	This Show Will Get You High	Various	Series regular, Comedy Central sketch pilot
2012	Animal Practice	Angela	Series regular, 9 episodes
2012–16	Comedy Bang! Bang!	Various	Recurring, 4 episodes
2013	Kroll Show	Renick's Co-Worker	Episode: "Can I Finish?"
2013	NTSF:SD:SUV	Dana	Episode: "A Hard Drive to Swallow"
2013	We Are Men	Katherine	Episode: "We Are Dognappers"
2013	Raising Hope	Candy	Episode: "Bee Story"
2014	The Millers	Nurse Jennifer	Recurring, 2 episodes
2014	Infomercials	Porcelaine	Episode: The Salad Mixxer
2014	Chelsea Lately	Herself - Round Table	Recurring, 2 episodes
2014	Review	Mary	Episode: "Revenge; Getting Rich; Aching"
2014–17	All Hail King Julien	Xixi (voice)	Recurring, 29 episodes
2014–25	Bob's Burgers	Patty/Jackie (voice)	4 episodes
2015	Big Time in Hollywood, FL	Darla	Recurring, 5 episodes
2015	Clipped	Rita Doyle	Recurring, 8 episodes
2015	Aqua Teen Hunger Force Forever	Queen Bee (voice)	Uncredited; Episode: "Sweet C"
2015–16	TripTank	Various Voices	Recurring, 2 episodes
2015, 2017	Dr. Ken	Sonja	2 episodes
2015–18	Another Period	Abortion Deb	Recurring, 5 episodes
2015–21	Superstore	Uptight Lady	5 episodes
2016	2 Broke Girls	Eunice	Episode: "And the Booth Babes"
2016	Love	Animal Shelter Employee	Episode: "The End Of The Beginning"
2016	Bajillion Dollar Propertie$	Loretta	Episode: "Uncle Jerry"
2016	Dice	Motorcyclist	Episode: "Alimony"
2016	Lady Dynamite	A.D. Betsy	2 episodes
2016	Tween Fest	Vomit Donna	Episode: "The Tubey Awards"
2016	Brooklyn Nine-Nine	Jordan Carfton	Episode: "Coral Palms, Part 1"
2016	Adam Ruins Everything	Terry aka Squatter	Episode: "Adam Ruins Housing"
2016–17	Right Now Kapow	Plant (voice)	Series regular; 26 episodes
2016–17	The Powerpuff Girls	Eddie / Angela (voice)	2 episodes
2017	Jeff & Some Aliens	US Ambassador (voice)	Episode: "Jeff & Some Jeffs"
2017	Girlboss	Betsy	Episode: "Vintage Fashion Forum"
2017	All Hail King Julien: Exiled	Xixi (voice)	2 episodes
2017	Comrade Detective	Marku's Landlady (voice)	Episode: "Bread Is Bread"
2017	Apollo Gauntlet	Rubis (voice)	5 episodes
2017–18	Disjointed	Dabby	18 episodes
2018	LA to Vegas	Kathy The Dental Hygenist	Episode: "#PilotFlight"
2018	Speechless	Kathleen	Episode: "N-o-Nominee"
2018	Little Big Awesome	Puddin' Peggy / Sherris (voice)	2 episodes
2018	Happy Together	Donna	Episode: "Scrubbing"
2018	Human Kind Of	Ms. Coward / Hungry Alien (voice)	7 episodes
2018	Rise of the Teenage Mutant Ninja Turtles	Ground Hog (voice)	Episode: "Pizza Pit"
2019	Tuca & Bertie	(voice)	Episode: "Plumage"
2019	Drunk History	Mary Mallon	Episode: "Bad Blood"
2019	Rapunzel's Tangled Adventure	Clementine (voice)	Episode: "Rapunzel's Return"
2019	The Loud House	Female Contest Judge (voice)	Episode: "Kings of the Con"
2019–21	Summer Camp Island	Skadi the Cloud Puncher (voice)	3 episodes
2019–25	Big City Greens	Community Sue (voice)	19 episodes
2020	Archibald's Next Big Thing	Shelby (voice)	Episode: "The Paperbirds/Rock and Egg Roll"
2020	Kipo and the Age of Wonderbeasts	Label (voice)	8 episodes
2020	Glitch Techs	Inspector 7 (voice)	2 episodes
2020	The Fungies!	Scrootch (voice)	Episode: "Cool Kids"
2020	It's Pony	Marti (voice)	Episode: "Loud Horse"
2020	The George Lucas Talk Show	Herself	Episode: "THX-2021"
2020–22	Duncanville	Bex (voice)	Series regular; character physically modeled after Sodaro
2020–22	Trolls: TrollsTopia	Clampers Buttonwillow	Recurring voice
2021	Drama Club	Mrs. Todd	2 episodes
2021	Poorly Drawn Lines	Turt (voice)	5 episodes
2022	American Auto	Alex	Episode: "Recall"
2022	Mr. Mayor	Teri	Episode: "Mayor Daddy"
2022	Hamster & Gretel	Coach Haggerty (voice)	Episode: "Cheer Cheer Bang Bang"
2022–24	Big Nate	Kim / various (voice)	12 episodes
2022–24	Baby Shark's Big Show!	Barb (voice)	6 episodes
2022–present	Ghosts	Nancy; Adeline Marie Dunham, Princess of Bedford	40 episodes
2023	Frog and Toad	Squirrel (voice)	2 episodes
2023–24	Night Court	Bert	Recurring
2023–25	Tiny Toons Looniversity	Dizzy Devil (voice)	12 episodes
2024	Moon Girl and Devil Dinosaur	Pogo Stick Alien (voice)	Episode: "The Great Beyond-er!"
2024	Exploding Kittens	Aidan (voice)	5 episodes
2024	Transformers: EarthSpark	Quintesson Judge (voice)	2 episodes
2024	St. Denis Medical	Female Patient	Episode: "Welcome to St. Denis"
2024	It's Florida, Man	The Vigilante	Episode: "Bunnies"
2024	Rock Paper Scissors	Potato (voice)	5 episodes

Digital shows
Year	Title	Role	Notes
2012	First Dates with Toby Harris	Friend #2	Episode: "Ex-Boyfriends"
2012–13	Lady Time	Eleanor	8 episodes
2014	Space Spring Break	Leslie	7 episodes
2014	Next Time on Lonny	Svetlana	Episode: "Choose Your Own Lonny"
2014	Beef	Dawna	1 episode
2014	300 Sunnyside	Betsy	3 episodes
2016	The Earliest Show	Katie Veal	Episode: "Bargaining"
2019	Kingpin Katie	Cheryl Wallace-Yablonski	Main cast
2020	Earth to Ned	Herself	Uncredited; Episode: "The Ned-aissance"
2023	Dirty Laundry	Herself	Episode: "Whose Family Van Got Stolen and Blown Up?"

Short films
Year	Title	Role	Notes
2019	Mushroom Park	Derek	Voice

Video games
Year	Title	Voice role
2022	High on Life	Sweezy
2026	High on Life 2	Sweezy
