= It's Florida, Man =

2024 American television series

- Genre: Comedy
- Created by: Mark Herwick; Jeff Tomsic
- Written by: Mark Herwick; Jeff Tomsic
- Directed by: Jeff Tomsic
- Country of origin: United States
- Original language: English
- No. of seasons: 2
- No. of episodes: 12

Production
- Executive producers: Justin Scot Comins; Mark Herwick; Brandon James; Danny McBride; Bryan Storkel; Jeff Tomsic
- Running time: 30 minutes
- Production companies: Range Studios; Rough House Pictures

Original release
- Network: HBO
- Release: October 18, 2024 – present

It's Florida, Man is an American anthology comedy television series created by Mark Herwick and Jeff Tomsic. It is based on the Australian series True Story with Hamish & Andy, created by Tim Bartley, Hamish Blake, Andy Lee, and Ryan Shelton, which released on the Nine Network. The series premiered on HBO on October 18, 2024.

In November 2024, the series was renewed for a second season, which premiered on November 28, 2025. In January 2026, the series was renewed for a third season.

== Cast and characters ==
=== Season 1 ===
- Betsy Sodaro as The Vigilante
- Anna Faris as Whitney
- Mary Elizabeth Ellis as Mia
- Jon Gries as Denver
- Sam Richardson as Phil
- Simon Rex as Eric Merda
- Randall Park as Real Steve
- Matty Cardarople as Creepy Steve
- Cameron Britton as John
- Steven Ogg as Jeff
- Echo Kellum as Derrick
- Steve Little as Bassnectar
- Ego Nwodim as Carolyn
- Juliette Lewis as Kim
- Michael Hitchcock as Bail Bondsman Tim

=== Season 2 ===
- Jeremy Renner as Speedy
- Adam DeVine as Chad
- Edi Patterson as Natalie
- Tiffany Haddish as Officer Bobbi
- Haley Joel Osment as Travis
- Bert Kreischer as Roy the Guard
- Nick Swardson as Bad Chad
- Johnny Knoxville as Timmy the Tweaker
- Shea Whigham as Walt
- Taika Waititi as Doctor Orlando
- Rita Ora as Doctor Jasonville
- Holmes as Bunnies
- David Koechner as Uncle Matt
- Joel Kim Booster as Lester
- Chet Hanks as Jimmy
- Milan Carter as Roman
- Nick Thune as Shane
- Swoosie Kurtz as Mrs. Myrtle
- Johnny Pemberton as Jared
- Ryan Mirvis as Greaser the Biker
- Brian Sacca as Sheriff Vic Reed
- Ping Wu as Lester's Dad
- Olivia Taylor Dudley as Denise
- Frankie Quiñones as Hansel
- Hassie Harrison as Bubbles
- Joseph Ruud as Liam the Thug
- Michael McDonald as John Walsh

== Episodes ==
| Season | Episodes | Originally released | |
| Season | Episodes | First released | Last released |
|---|---|---|---|
| 1 | 6 | October 18, 2024 | November 22, 2024 |
| 2 | 6 | November 28, 2025 | January 2, 2026 |

=== Season 1 (2024) ===
| No. overall | No. in season | Title | Directed by | Written by | Original release date | US viewers (millions) |
|---|---|---|---|---|---|---|
| 1 | 1 | "Toes" | Jeff Tomsic | Mark Herwick and Jeff Tomsic | October 18, 2024 | N/A |
| 2 | 2 | "Gator" | Jeff Tomsic | Mark Herwick and Jeff Tomsic | October 25, 2024 | N/A |
| 3 | 3 | "Mermaids" | Jeff Tomsic | Mark Herwick and Jeff Tomsic | November 1, 2024 | N/A |
| 4 | 4 | "Saucy" | Jeff Tomsic | Mark Herwick and Jeff Tomsic | November 8, 2024 | N/A |
| 5 | 5 | "Bunnies" | Jeff Tomsic | Mark Herwick and Jeff Tomsic | November 15, 2024 | N/A |
| 6 | 6 | "Mugshot" | Jeff Tomsic | Mark Herwick and Jeff Tomsic | November 22, 2024 | N/A |

=== Season 2 (2025–26) ===
| No. overall | No. in season | Title | Directed by | Written by | Original release date | US viewers (millions) |
|---|---|---|---|---|---|---|
| 7 | 1 | "Speedy" | Jeff Tomsic | Mark Herwick and Jeff Tomsic | November 28, 2025 | N/A |
| 8 | 2 | "Pizza Man" | Jeff Tomsic | Mark Herwick and Jeff Tomsic | December 5, 2025 | N/A |
| 9 | 3 | "Cuckoo Girl" | Jeff Tomsic | Mark Herwick and Jeff Tomsic | December 12, 2025 | N/A |
| 10 | 4 | "Bigfoot" | Jeff Tomsic | Mark Herwick and Jeff Tomsic | December 19, 2025 | N/A |
| 11 | 5 | "Moonshine" | Jeff Tomsic | Mark Herwick and Jeff Tomsic | December 26, 2025 | N/A |
| 12 | 6 | "Crushed" | Jeff Tomsic | Mark Herwick and Jeff Tomsic | January 2, 2026 | N/A |

== Production ==
The series is produced by Danny McBride, Jody Hill, and David Gordon Green's studio Rough House Pictures. Producers sought out Floridians to submit stories to the show.
