= Abby's =

American sitcom that aired on NBC

- Genre: Sitcom
- Created by: Josh Malmuth
- Starring: Natalie Morales; Nelson Franklin; Jessica Chaffin; Leonard Ouzts; Kimia Behpoornia; Neil Flynn
- Music by: Brian H. Kim
- Country of origin: United States
- Original language: English
- No. of seasons: 1
- No. of episodes: 10

Production
- Executive producers: Josh Malmuth; Michael Schur; David Miner; Pamela Fryman
- Cinematography: Gregg Heschong
- Editors: Kenny Tintorri; Stephen Prime
- Camera setup: Multi-camera
- Running time: 22 minutes
- Production companies: Waila Inc. Productions; Fremulon; 3 Arts Entertainment; Universal Television

Original release
- Network: NBC
- Release: March 28 – June 13, 2019

Abby's is an American sitcom television series created by Josh Malmuth that aired from March 28 to June 13, 2019, on NBC. The series stars Natalie Morales, Neil Flynn, Nelson Franklin, Jessica Chaffin, Leonard Ouzts, and Kimia Behpoornia. In May 2019, the series was canceled after one season.

== Premise ==
Set in San Diego, the series takes place at the home of Abby, a bisexual Latina ex-Marine sergeant, who turned her backyard into an unlicensed bar complete with her own set of rules, which the eclectic set of regulars have to follow.

== Cast and characters ==
- Natalie Morales as Abby, a former Marine sergeant and the owner of the unlicensed bar, Abby's
- Nelson Franklin as Bill, an engineer and Abby's new landlord who initially disapproves of the bar, but eventually comes around and joins her circle of patrons
- Jessica Chaffin as Beth, a lawyer-turned housewife and one of the bar's most loyal customers
- Leonard Ouzts as James, the bouncer for Abby's despite his distaste for confrontation and meek personality
- Kimia Behpoornia as Rosie Consari, Abby's bar-back and oldest friend
- Neil Flynn as Fred Herbert, a functioning alcoholic bail bondsman who has known Abby since she was a young girl and acts as a father figure to her

== Production ==
=== Inspiration ===
Josh Malmuth, a San Diego native, was inspired by a New Orleans wine bar, Bacchanal, with an outdoor patio, string lighting, a music stage, and two stories of indoor and outdoor seating. The show is set in San Diego, and filmed in Universal City Studios.

=== Development ===
On September 22, 2017, the production, then untitled, received a put pilot commitment from NBC. The pilot was written by Josh Malmuth who was set to executive produce alongside Mike Schur and David Miner. Production companies involved with the pilot were expected to include Universal Television, Fremulon, and 3 Arts Entertainment. On January 23, 2018, NBC officially gave the production a pilot order. A week later, it was announced that Pamela Fryman would direct the pilot.

On May 8, 2018, it was announced that NBC had given the production a series order. A few days later, it was announced that the series would premiere as a mid-season replacement in the spring of 2019. On January 24, 2019, it was announced that the series would premiere on March 28, 2019. The series notably is filmed using a largely outdoor set. On May 30, 2019, NBC canceled the series after a single season.

=== Casting ===
On February 22, 2018, it was announced that Natalie Morales had been cast as the titular Abby. In March 2018, it was reported that Nelson Franklin, Jessica Chaffin, Leonard Ouzts, Neil Flynn, and Kimia Behpoornia had joined the cast as series regulars.

== Episodes ==
No.	Title	Directed by	Written by	Original release date	U.S. viewers (millions)
1	"Pilot"	Pamela Fryman	Josh Malmuth	March 28, 2019	2.60
Abby, a former Marine who runs an unlicensed bar out of her backyard with a strict seating hierarchy, learns that her old landlady has died and willed her property to her nephew, Bill, who demands that she close the bar. Abby's patrons Fred, Beth, James, and Rosie explain to him that she has a good heart, and that the bar is heavily regulated, before inducting him into their group. Bill finally agrees to let the bar stay open, but only if Abby gets insurance, improves safety, and applies for a liquor license. She refuses, and instead announces the bar will close that night. Fred, Rosie, and Beth try to talk her out of it, and Fred points out that she ought to give Bill the benefit of the doubt. Abby agrees to implement some of his suggestions, and makes Bill a mai tai (a drink she hates) to prove her commitment to their deal.
2	"Rule Change"	Pamela Fryman	Niki Schwartz-Wright	April 4, 2019	2.06
When James complains about a rule forbidding men to wear sandals, he asks Bill to speak to Abby, who ignores him. Bill then issues a challenge, in which the two must present their best arguments and put them to a public vote. Both try to win over different patrons to their side, but with little success. The vote is held, and Abby declares victory, only for Beth to change her vote when Bill takes up her demand to have Abby's trees trimmed. With the vote tied, a game of bocce is held as a tiebreaker. Fred tells Abby that the problem isn't Bill, but her refusal to listen to her customers. He also reminds her that Bill just wants to belong. Abby wins the game, but honors Bill for scoring zero points. Abby tells Beth she will take care of the trees and gives James permission to wear sandals on certain days.
3	"Free Alcohol Day"	Pamela Fryman	Brig Muñoz-Liebowitz	April 11, 2019	1.64
The bar prepares for "Free Alcohol Day", when Abby's friend Dani brings free samples for everyone. However, her latest product, an allspice-infused gin, is unpalatable. Beth tries to set Dani up with Abby, only to be embarrassed when she learns that the two previously dated and Abby didn't tell her. In response, Abby issues a challenge for anyone who wants to know about her personal life to drink shots of the gin, only to give vague answers. Upset, a drunk Beth goes into Abby's house and they argue. Desperate to salvage Free Alcohol Day, Fred persuades the others to just drink the rest of the gin. After Beth admits that she feels neglected, Abby tells her that she's the reason she decided to open the bar. The next morning, Abby puts Beth's favorite wine on tap. Bill apologizes to Abby for making an awkward comment about her bisexuality.
4	"Book Club"	Phill Lewis	Shaun Diston	April 18, 2019	1.53
The gang tries to push Fred to go on a date with Emily, a member of Beth's book club. However, Fred, having been divorced for fifteen years, is reluctant to get intimate again. James tries to woo his friend Willa, but fails and decides to try again with a patron named Erica. Their first conversation goes poorly when he lies about being fluent in Spanish. Fred finally agrees to go on a date with Emily, which consists of him grilling steaks at the bar. They hit it off, deciding to move in together after just one day; Fred also starts to change his personality. Abby puts her foot down and tells Fred she was wrong to push him to change. Fred then reveals their relationship was a prank the entire time. James chooses not to date Erica when he realizes he isn't ready. Abby and Beth use reverse psychology to get Fred to hook back up with Emily.
5	"Mail Bin"	Beth McCarthy-Miller	Taylor Cox & Jacquie Walters	April 25, 2019	1.47
While sorting through unopened mail, Bill finds a letter from Abby's deadbeat father Abelardo containing a check for $287.50, which she believes is him trying to buy her forgiveness. She wants to throw it out, but when the group tells her doing so would be unfair, they decide to instead spend it on a ridiculous purchase and start brainstorming. A random patron then decides whose purchase they make. James' idea, a combination popcorn/hot dog maker, wins. Fred finds another letter from Abelardo revealing that the check is actually part of two installments to make up for every birthday of hers he missed. When she goes to cash it, however, she finds out that it's worthless. Heartbroken, Abby burns the rest of her mail. In a show of solidarity, the group buys the popcorn-hot dog maker for her and affirm that she doesn't need her father's approval to be happy.
6	"Liquid Courage"	Pamela Fryman	Russ Finkelstein & Marc Muszynski	May 2, 2019	1.49
James is offered a better paying job, but feels that accepting it would mean too much responsibility. Bill decides to say goodbye to every patron after Fred walks away from their conversation. To help James decide, the group decides to bring out "Tequila Jimmy", his drunk personality. Abby's unpleasant neighbor Richard threatens to report her to the police unless she agrees to close the bar early, so she talks him into giving her a few weeks to make improvements. However, James, now full of confidence, throws Richard out and he reneges on the deal. Seeing Bill struggling, Fred steps in to help. Abby calls Richard back and has James warn him of the consequences of closing the bar too soon, which convinces him to sign back onto the deal. James completes his first day as a manager and gifts Abby with a bottle of expensive tequila. Bill and Fred patch things up.
7	"Soda Gun"	Pamela Fryman	Betsy Thomas	May 9, 2019	1.40
Abby's soda gun breaks, so Bill has his friend Cory fix it. This annoys Fred, who considers himself the bar's go-to handyman. James prepares a new emergency plan for the bar, but Rosie tells him it's too complicated to be of any use. The gang tries to cheer up Fred by lighting up the bar and playing his favorite song, but nothing works. Out of desperation, they give him the "Token", allowing him a week of free drinks, but he refuses it, drops it on the ground, and then accidentally steps on it. Beth explains that Fred wants to be useful to Abby because he sees her as a daughter, so Abby talks to him and tells him that no matter what, she will always see him as the closest thing she has to a father. Harmony is restored to the bar, and Rosie comforts James by telling him that the bar's safety depends on everyone looking out for each other.
8	"Backup"	Phill Lewis	Noah Garfinkel	May 30, 2019	1.55
Abby is upset when Bill steps in to deal with some unruly customers, which she feels is her responsibility. James accidentally breaks Beth's prize mug and pins it on another patron, who is then punished by being placed in the "sprinkler chair". Bill defends his actions by pointing out that he's taller and thus more intimidating than Abby, so Fred suggests a jar-opening contest to see who's stronger; Bill wins and a frustrated Abby picks up a lit grill, severely burning her hands. Too stubborn to accept help, Abby resorts to using her mouth to help pour drinks and winds up making a huge mess. Bill apologizes by letting Abby put him in a submission hold and they agree to start accepting help from each other. James confesses to breaking the mug, and Bill and Abby manage to repair it using glue and a 3D printer.
9	"Rosie's Band"	Pamela Fryman	Josh Malmuth	May 30, 2019	1.46
Bill learns about the ongoing feud between Abby and Nemo's, a bar that used to be the most popular spot in the neighborhood. Rosie gets permission to do a set that night with her band; however, the group decides not to tell her that her music is unlistenable. Overjoyed, Rosie decides to start playing the bar every week. James becomes convinced that a customer at the bar, Clark, is a wanted fugitive, but Fred tells him he's paranoid. Abby and Beth try to cut a deal with Nemo's to get the band off their hands, but Rosie overhears and feels betrayed. She tells Abby that she's tough enough to take criticism, and that Abby should always be honest with her. In return, Abby agrees to let her play once a month. The cops show up to take Clark into custody for running, and Bill covers up the bar's existence by holding a fake wedding with Beth.
10	"The Fish"	Betsy Thomas	Chelsea Devantez	June 13, 2019	1.23
When Bill admits to the group that he has Padres season tickets behind home plate that he lost in his divorce, they have him invite his ex-wife Sharon to the bar to reclaim them. Bill explains that Sharon is experienced at tearing him down emotionally, so the group boosts his confidence and he succeeds in convincing her to give the tickets back. However, Sharon then reveals that she also wants to get back together, so the bar throws an improvised "tuna luau" to keep them from leaving. Bill eventually realizes that Sharon doesn't truly love him when she insults his friends and he breaks up with her, declaring that this is his life now. Abby then gives him his own barstool--something only a regular is allowed to have--and decides to keep the tuna luau as an ongoing event.

== Reception ==
=== Critical response ===
On review aggregator Rotten Tomatoes, the series holds an approval rating of 73% based on 15 reviews, with an average rating of 6.01/10. The website's critical consensus reads: "Despite some watered down, outdated humor, Abby's brims with potential thanks to its easy going, goofy sensibility and a perfectly cast Natalie Morales." On Metacritic, it has a weighted average score of 60 out of 100, based on 15 critics, indicating "mixed or average reviews".

The Hollywood Reporter wrote: "a likable cast led by Natalie Morales, but very few early laughs"..."The three episodes sent to critics are nonsequential and don’t really build much in terms of the bar’s legality or any developing character relationships or much of anything."

=== Ratings ===
Viewership and ratings per episode of Abby's
No.	Title	Air date	Rating/share (18–49)	Viewers (millions)	DVR (18–49)	DVR viewers (millions)	Total (18–49)	Total viewers (millions)
1	"Pilot"	March 28, 2019	0.5/3	2.60	0.2	0.89	0.7	3.49
2	"Rule Change"	April 4, 2019	0.5/3	2.06	0.2	0.70	0.7	2.76
3	"Free Alcohol Day"	April 11, 2019	0.4/2	1.64	0.2	0.51	0.6	2.15
4	"Book Club"	April 18, 2019	0.4/2	1.53	0.1	0.55	0.5	2.07
5	"Mail Bin"	April 25, 2019	0.3/2	1.47	0.2	0.56	0.5	2.03
6	"Liquid Courage"	May 2, 2019	0.4/2	1.49	—N/a	—N/a	—N/a	—N/a
7	"Soda Gun"	May 9, 2019	0.4/2	1.40	0.2	0.53	0.6	1.93
8	"Backup"	May 30, 2019	0.4/2	1.55	—N/a	—N/a	—N/a	—N/a
9	"Rosie's Band"	May 30, 2019	0.3/2	1.46	—N/a	—N/a	—N/a	—N/a
10	"The Fish"	June 13, 2019	0.3/1	1.23	—N/a	—N/a	—N/a	—N/a
