= Mike Castle (actor) =

American actor

- Born: Chicago, Illinois, U.S.
- Other name: Michael Castle
- Occupations: Actor, Comedian
- Years active: 2011–present
- Spouse: Lauren Lapkus (m. 2018)
- Children: 2

Mike Castle is an American actor and comedian from Chicago, Illinois.

== Early life ==
He attended Brother Rice High School, graduating in 2007.

== Career ==
Castle began his career in 2011, playing Randy in the short called The Ghosts. The following year, Castle was in the 2012 television movie Family Trap. He also was in an episode of the television show Harder Than It Looks, playing the delivery guy.

In 2014, Castle was in an episode of the television series Sirens. Castle also appeared in the television mini-series Hope & Randy in 2014.

Castle starred as A.J. Salerno in the TBS television series Clipped, alongside Ashley Tisdale and George Wendt, in 2015.

Castle is known for playing Adam in Netflix's Brews Brothers. Castle played a videographer in season 11, episode 8 of Curb Your Enthusiasm.

== Personal life ==
He married actress and comedian Lauren Lapkus on October 5, 2018. They have two daughters born in 2021 and 2024. He is an avid chess player and member of Mensa.

Canadian singer-songwriter Dan Mangan performed a song at Castle's wedding to Lapkus. Castle has since been credited as a contributing songwriter on "I Hated Love Songs" from Mangan's 2025 album Natural Light.
