= Matt Cook (actor) =

American actor

- Born: July 12, 1984 (age 42)
- Occupation: Actor
- Years active: 2009–present

Matt Cook is an American actor, known mostly for his roles as Mo McCracken on the TBS sitcom Clipped and Lowell in the CBS sitcom Man with a Plan.

== Personal life ==
Cook grew up in Barnegat Light and Ship Bottom on Long Beach Island in New Jersey, where he attended Southern Regional High School. He attended Rider University in Lawrenceville, New Jersey, where he earned a Bachelor of Arts degree. He then moved to Los Angeles and trained in improv and sketch comedy at The Groundlings.

== Career ==
Cook first appeared on television as a waiter in the HBO series Curb Your Enthusiasm. He went on to have recurring roles in Unleashed, Harry's Law and True Blood before landing a starring role on the short-lived TBS sitcom Clipped in 2015. In 2016, Cook was cast as Lowell in the new CBS sitcom Man with a Plan, starring Matt LeBlanc up until the show's cancellation in 2020. Cook also appeared in episode 4 of the first season of Mom.

== Select filmography ==
Year	Title	Role	Notes
2009	Curb Your Enthusiasm	Waiter	Episode: “The Table Read”
2009	The De-Evolution of Ben Stiller	Driver in a Rush	Short film
2010	Kill Spin	Harley	9 episodes
2011	Unleashed	Tim Garrick	6 episodes
2011	Whitney	Clerk	Episode: “A Decent Proposal”
2012	Harry's Law	ADA Upton Cruickshank	4 episodes
2011–2012	2 Broke Girls	Band Member/Brody	Episodes: “Pilot”, “And Martha Stewart Have a Ball (Part 1)”
2012	Kickin' It	Wink	Episode: “Karate Games”
2013	Austin & Ally	Al the Magnificent	Episode: “Couples & Careers”
2013	True Blood	Jessie	3 episodes
2013	Mom	Geoff	Episode: "Loathing and Tube Socks"
2014, 2026	The Comeback	Ivan; P.D.P.	8 episodes
2014	Bucky and the Squirrels	Randy	Film
2014	If Loving You Is Wrong (TV Series)	Seasons 1-3	Joey Blackman
2015	Jessie	Mr. Feeley	Episode: “Dance, Dance, Resolution”
2015	Clipped	Mo McCracken	Main role, 10 episodes
2016	Maron	Dentist	Episode: "Bookend"
2016–2020	Man with a Plan	Lowell Franklin	Main role, 66 episodes (2 credit only)
2017	Grace and Frankie	Derrick Flout	Episode: "The Art Show"
2019	This Isn't Funny	Dave	TV movie
2020	Will & Grace	Ross Elliott	Episode: "We Love Lucy"
2021	Q-Force	(voice)	Episode: "Deb's BBQ"
2021	Being the Ricardos	1st AD	Film
2022	Chip 'n Dale: Rescue Rangers	Man in Chipmunk Costume	Film
2022	The Greatest Beer Run Ever	Lt. Habershaw	Film
2023	Champions	Sonny	Film

Key
†	Denotes works that have not yet been released
