= Animal Practice =

American sitcom

- Promotional image
- Genre: Sitcom
- Created by: Alessandro Tanaka; Brian Gatewood
- Starring: Justin Kirk; Crystal the Monkey; Joanna García Swisher; Bobby Lee; Kym Whitley; Betsy Sodaro; Tyler Labine
- Composer: Ludwig Göransson
- Country of origin: United States
- Original language: English
- No. of seasons: 1
- No. of episodes: 9

Production
- Executive producers: Scot Armstrong; Brian Gatewood; Ravi Nandan; Anthony Russo; Joe Russo; Alessandro Tanaka
- Camera setup: Single-camera
- Running time: 22 minutes
- Production companies: American Work, Inc.; Universal Television; Open 4 Business Productions

Original release
- Network: NBC
- Release: August 12 – November 28, 2012

Animal Practice is an American sitcom television series that aired on NBC from August 12 to November 28, 2012, on the network's Thanksgiving 2012 television schedule. The series premiered after the end of the 2012 Olympic games (which the network was showing) and was produced by Universal Television and American Work. The series starred Justin Kirk and is set at a veterinary office. The series was canceled on December 3, 2012, due to low ratings, and replaced by Whitney on November 14, 2012. In addition, the final three episodes were released on NBC.com and Hulu on November 20, 2012.

== Cast and characters ==
=== Main cast and characters ===
- Justin Kirk as Dr. George Coleman
  - Wyatt Oleff as Young George
- Joanna García Swisher as Dorothy Crane
- Bobby Lee as Dr. Robert Yamamoto
- Kym Whitley as Juanita
- Betsy Sodaro as Angela
- Tyler Labine as Dr. Doug Jackson
- Crystal the Monkey as Dr. Rizzo

=== Recurring cast and characters ===
- June Diane Raphael as Dr. Jill Leiter
- Brian Huskey as Nurse Howard

== Development and production ==
The show was originally known as Animal Kingdom when it was in development. The network placed a series order in May 2012. Amy Huberman played the role of "Dorothy Crane" in the original pilot; however, the role was recast with Joanna García.

Crystal the Monkey's character was originally known as "Dr. Zaius" but the rights to the name could not be obtained. At the time of production, Crystal was known for her appearances in a number of motion pictures, most notably the Night at the Museum series.

Marco Pennette replaced Gail Lerner as showrunner after the third episode had been shot.

== Promotion ==
NBC executives "are high on [the show]. I'm not sure they're high on it because of the writing or if it's a real good show, or because it tested well with the monkey."

— Sam Armando, senior VP
at SMGx, a unit of Publicis Groupe

While promoting the show to ad buyers, NBC told them that "Crystal" the capuchin had had "powerful reception among test audiences", and "is perhaps the best-known element about the new show—and, maybe, NBC's entire fall season."

NBC ran a sneak preview of the series on August 12, 2012, as a lead-out for the closing ceremony of the 2012 Summer Olympics; controversially, the already tape-delayed and abridged broadcast was interrupted to air the pilot, causing the ceremony (which featured a performance by The Who) to be preempted after late local newscasts.

== Episodes ==
No.	Title	Directed by	Written by	Original release date	Prod. code	U.S. viewers (millions)
1	"Pilot"	Anthony & Joe Russo	Brian Gatewood & Alessandro Tanaka	August 12, 2012	101	12.80
2	"Little Miss Can't Be Wrong"	Jeff Melman	Jamie Rhonheimer	September 26, 2012	103	5.19
3	"Clean-Smelling Pirate"	Anthony Russo	Aseem Batra	October 3, 2012	102	4.56
4	"Dr. Yamamazing"	Jay Chandrasekhar	John Blickstead & Trey Kollmer	October 10, 2012	104	3.80
5	"Who's Afraid of Virginia Coleman?"	Jeff Melman	Curtis Gwinn	October 17, 2012	105	3.85
6	"The Two George Colemans"	Elodie Keene	Steve Hely	October 24, 2012	106	3.68
7	"Wingmen"	Jeff Melman	Amelie Gillette	October 31, 2012 (broadcast); November 1, 2012 (NBC.com)	108	N/A
8	"Ralphie"	Joe Russo	Brian Gatewood & Alessandro Tanaka	November 7, 2012 (broadcast); November 20, 2012 (NBC.com)	107	N/A
9	"Turkey Jerky"	Eric Appel	Laura Chinn	November 20, 2012 (NBC.com); November 28, 2012 (broadcast)	109	N/A

== Reception ==
According to Metacritic, the show has received a score of 48/100 and mixed critical reviews. Drusilla Moorhouse, of entertainment news website Zap2It, wrote that "It's too cringe-worthy for overempathizing animal lovers, but general audiences might tune in for a lighthearted, escapist laugh." While Moorhouse's review was more positive, Robert Bianco of USA Today gave a negative review, stating "The shame is that Practice has a fine human cast...but Kirk and his cohorts quickly get taken down by the barrage of stupidity the show sends their way."

== Awards and accolades ==
Awards and accolades for Animal Practice
Year	Award	Category	Recipient	Result	Ref.
2013	Young Artist Award	Best Performance in a TV Movie, Miniseries, Special or Pilot - Supporting Young Actress	Bobbie Prewitt	Nominated	

== International broadcasts ==
In the UK, Animal Practice aired on ITV2 beginning February 11, 2013.

== See also ==
- Mr. Smith, a 1983 NBC sitcom featuring an orangutan
