= Unholy (2007 film) =

2007 American independent horror film

- Directed by: Daryl Goldberg
- Written by: Sam Freeman; Daryl Goldberg
- Produced by: Joshua Blumenfeld
- Starring: Adrienne Barbeau; Nicholas Brendon
- Distributed by: Anchor Bay Entertainment
- Release date: September 4, 2007
- Country: United States
- Language: English

Unholy is a 2007 American independent horror film about Nazi mysticism directed by Daryl Goldberg and starring Adrienne Barbeau and Nicholas Brendon. It was written by Samuel Stephen Freeman and produced by Joshua Blumenfeld and Sky Whisper Productions. Its release on DVD was on September 4, 2007.

== Plot ==
The film deals with a grieving mother, Martha (Barbeau), trying to uncover the terrifying secret jeopardizing her family. With her son (Brendon), Martha becomes entwined in a conspiracy involving a fabled witch, Nazi occultists, and the United States of America (U.S.) government.

The film purports to be inspired by an actual military document. The document is viewable on the movie's website by simply clicking on the interactive image of the document. Following World War II, a classified U.S. military document was uncovered that recounted a Nazi experiment of an occult nature smuggled into an underground facility in Downingtown, Pennsylvania. The film's website purports to "have provided the only known copy of a portion of that document ... we strongly advise that you do not download it;" however, the document can be found on the same website.

== Reception ==
Mike Phalin from Dread central said of the film: "what could have been a full and complex tale, transform[ed] it into something awful." John Dubrawa from Classic-Horror.com said: "For a movie with so much happening, it's also slow-moving, uninteresting, and dull."

Ain't It Cool News said "I have to say, I was going in expecting this would be a B Horror Film, but I was shocked that this movie was the original, smart, and innovative."
