= Tig (film) =

- Directed by: Kristina Goolsby; Ashley York
- Written by: Jennifer Arnold
- Produced by: Beachside Films
- Starring: Tig Notaro
- Edited by: Scott Evans
- Production company: Netflix
- Distributed by: Netflix
- Release date: July 17, 2015
- Country: United States
- Language: English

Tig is a 2015 documentary film directed by Kristina Goolsby and Ashley York with additional directing and writing by Jennifer Arnold and starring Tig Notaro. The film chronicles Notaro's trials dealing with being diagnosed with breast cancer, her attempts to have a child, and the beginning of her relationship of with her fiancée Stephanie Allynne.

The documentary premiered at Sundance to rave reviews. Notaro hoped the film would be an "inspiring and humorous example of moving forward and taking risks in life as it continues to swing in every possible direction."

Singer Sharon Van Etten wrote a song in homage to Tig called "Words" that is shown in the credits.

In regard to why she wanted to make the film, Goolsby said, "I was beyond inspired by Tig and how she was navigating her life in the midst of total loss and devastation. Here was a person on the precipice of great change, and the possibility of capturing her journey as she put her life together after an unfathomable series of events, in real time, was a chance to tell a powerful story that could illuminate the courage, compassion, and extraordinary strength of Tig."

== Synopsis ==
In 2012, Notaro was diagnosed with breast cancer before she decided to perform a set of new material at the L.A. comedy club Largo, a performance that made her a viral sensation. This documentary focuses on the year that followed that night. Notaro performs at clubs across the country while dealing with a new relationship with the actress Stephanie Allynne, trying to have a child, and coping with the passing of her mother.

== See also ==
- List of lesbian, gay, bisexual or transgender-related films of 2015
