= Good One (album) =

Live album by Tig Notaro
- Released: August 2, 2011
- Recorded: March 24, 2011
- Venue: The Comedy Attic in Bloomington, Indiana
- Genre: Comedy
- Length: 46:40
- Label: Secretly Canadian

Tig Notaro chronology
Good One (2011)	Live (2012)

Good One is the debut live album by comedian Tig Notaro released by Secretly Canadian in 2011 on CD, download and vinyl. It is the first comedy album released by the record label. The CD comes with a DVD titled Have Tig at Your Party which was produced in 2008 by Tig's production company ZeroDollarsAndZeroSenseProductions. Notaro toured with fellow Secretly Canadian artist Jens Lekman before recording the album. The album was recorded on Tig's 40th birthday. Fellow comedian and friend, Sarah Silverman, can be heard introducing Tig at the beginning of the show. The back cover photo is of Tig's actual filing cabinet which was given to her by director Sam Raimi when she was his assistant years ago.

== Track listing ==
Disc 1: CD - Good One

No.	Title	Length
1.	"Introduction"	0:46
2.	"Chastity"	0:41
3.	"Popular Phrases"	1:03
4.	"Names"	1:36
5.	"Family Tree"	2:43
6.	"Can You Believe It"	1:34
7.	"Baby Shower"	2:11
8.	"Artificial Insemination"	1:00
9.	"No Moleste"	2:50
10.	"Little Titties"	1:42
11.	"Taylor Dayne"	11:50
12.	"Self Defense/Shark Attack"	12:37
13.	"Infinity FX"	3:27
14.	"The Show's Over"	2:49

Disc 2: DVD - Have Tig at Your Party!

No.	Title	Length
1.	"The Infomercial"	18:21
2.	"Outtakes"	10:08
3.	"Tig At Your Party!"	57:50

== Credits ==
- Recorded, Mixed and Mastered - Mike Bridavsky at Russian Recording
- Front Cover Photo - Cassie Wright
- Back Cover and Liner Notes Photos - Stef Willen
- Liner Notes Photo - T. Ballard Lesemann
- Album Dedication - Sheila Leblanc
- Special Thanks - Mark Flanagan, David Huntsberger, Nick Kroll, Martha Kelly, Heather Lawless, Dave Hill, Michael McDonald, Grant Curtis, Katie Wright, Scott Aukerman, Chris Young, Jimmy Dore, Clea DuVall, Kate Micucci, Cheryl Hines, Jens Lekman, Kyle Dunnigan
- Note: There are many more Thank You credits, but these are just the main notable people.

== Charts ==
The album reached No. 4 on the Billboard Top Comedy Albums chart.
