= Bentzen Ball =

American comedy festival (2009–present)

The 2009 Bentzen Ball logo

The Bentzen Ball is a comedy festival held in Washington, D.C., first in 2009, and then in 2013. It is produced by the D.C.-based online magazine and event company Brightest Young Things (often abbreviated as BYT) and curated by Tig Notaro.

Named for Ollie Bentzen, a Danish man who allegedly laughed himself to death during a screening of the film A Fish Called Wanda, the inaugural festival featured 60 comedians and 26 shows from October 22, 2009 to October 25, 2009. The second festival was held October 10–13, 2013, and was jokingly billed as the "Fifth Annual Bentzen Ball," referring to its hiatus.

== History ==
=== 2009 ===
The 2009 Bentzen Ball consisted of 26 shows and 60 comedians. The festival opened on October 22 with an opening night headlined by Patton Oswalt with Rory Scovel and Kyle Kinane at the Lincoln Theatre and closed with a Sarah Silverman headlined-show featuring Chelsea Peretti, Steve Agee, Laura Silverman and Tig Notaro at the 9:30 Club on October 25. Shows were also held at the Studio Theatre, HR-57 Center for the Preservation of Jazz and Blues, Bohemian Caverns and Black Cat as well as a drop-in open mic show at Ben's Chili Bowl hosted by Justin Cousson and Vish Bhatt.

==== 2009 performers ====
- Patton Oswalt
- Sarah Silverman
- Todd Barry
- Mary Lynn Rajskub
- Tig Notaro
- Jimmy Dore
- Morgan Murphy
- Dave Hill
- Reggie Watts
- Matt Braunger
- Chelsea Peretti
- Natasha Leggero
- Nick Thune
- Paul Rust
- Laura Silverman
- Ian Edwards
- Steve Agee
- A.D. Miles
- Nick Offerman
- Kyle Dunnigan
- Jen Kirkman
- Jackie Kashian
- Kyle Kinane
- Jesse Thorn
- Brendon Walsh
- Cynthia Levin
- David Huntsberger
- Lizz Winstead
- Adam Cayton-Holland
- Duncan Trussell
- Ruby Wendell
- Seth Herzog
- Andy Wood
- Aparna Nancherla
- Jeff Klinger
- Jeff Maurer
- Rory Scovel

=== 2013 ===
The 2013 Bentzen Ball opening night was headlined by Notaro once again, joined by Doug Benson, Wyatt Cenac, Everything is Terrible, Heather Lawless and others on October 10 at the 9:30 Club. A live episode of Doug Loves Movies was taped as part of the festival at the Sphinx Club on October 11, and the festival closed with an Ira Glass and Friends show at the Lincoln Theatre on October 13.

Other acts who performed at the 2013 festival were Nick Offerman, Nick Kroll, Garfunkel and Oates, Moshe Kasher, Megan Mullally, Brody Stevens, Kate Flannery, Sara Schaefer, Martha Kelly, Rachel Dratch, Michael Hitchcock, Janet Varney, Jessica Makinson, Cole Stratton, Graham Elwood, Brandon Wardell, Andy Wood, Jena Friedman, and others, plus DJ sets by They Might Be Giants and Animal Collective.

== Record label ==
In 2016, Notaro released the first comedy album on Bentzen Ball Records on July 8, Aparna Nancherla: Just Putting it Out There.

Later that year on August 5, the second release on the label was Tig's own third album, Boyish Girl Interrupted, released jointly with Secretly Canadian.
