= Good One =

Good One may refer to:

- Good One (album), a 2011 live album by Tig Notaro
- Good One (film), a 2024 American drama film
