= Under a Rock with Tig Notaro =

American talk show

- Genre: Talk show
- Created by: Funny or Die
- Directed by: Amy Landecker; Riki Lindhome
- Presented by: Tig Notaro
- Country of origin: United States
- Original language: English
- No. of seasons: 2
- No. of episodes: 12

Production
- Production companies: Something Fierce; Funny or Die

Original release
- Network: Funny or Die
- Release: June 4 – December 17, 2019

Under a Rock with Tig Notaro is an American talk show produced by Funny or Die. Host Tig Notaro attempts to guess the identity of a celebrity guest on each episode. The show is sponsored by Amazon Alexa, and Alexa provides assistance as Notaro guesses. The first season consisted of six episodes and premiered online on June 4, 2019. The second season was released on November 5, 2019.

== Synopsis ==
Comedian Tig Notaro struggles to guess the identity of a celebrity guest, made difficult by the little pop culture she consumes and her inability to recognize celebrity faces. The guest offers her clues and Amazon Alexa assists Notaro.

== Production ==
=== Development ===
Notaro developed the idea for the show due to her penchant for failing to recognize very famous people such as Anne Hathaway and Al Pacino.

The show is produced by Funny or Die and Something Fierce, the production company owned by Notaro and her wife Stephanie Allynne. The series is shot in front of a studio audience. The producers invite celebrity guests with whom Notaro is unfamiliar.

Series one was directed by Amy Landecker and season two was directed by Riki Lindhome. Thomas Ouellette is the head writer. Amazon Alexa sponsors the series.

=== Release ===
Under a Rock premiered on June 4, 2019, on FunnyorDie.com. Episodes in the first season were released every Tuesday for six weeks. Season two debuted on November 5, 2019, and ran for six more episodes.

== Episodes ==
Season	Episodes	Originally released	
Season	Episodes	First released	Last released
1	6	June 4, 2019	July 9, 2019
2	6	November 5, 2019	December 17, 2019

=== Season 1 ===
No. in season	Title	Directed by	Original release date
1	"James Van Der Beek"	Amy Landecker	June 4, 2019
2	"Julie Bowen"	Amy Landecker	June 11, 2019
3	"Wyclef Jean"	Amy Landecker	June 18, 2019
4	"Melissa Joan Hart"	Amy Landecker	June 25, 2019
5	"Wolfgang Puck"	Amy Landecker	July 2, 2019
6	"Glenn Howerton"	Amy Landecker	July 9, 2019

=== Season 2 ===
No. in season	Title	Directed by	Original release date
1	"Lena Headey"	Riki Lindhome	November 5, 2019
2	"Kaley Cuoco"	Riki Lindhome	November 12, 2019
3	"Rich Eisen"	Riki Lindhome	November 19, 2019
4	"Tony Shalhoub"	Riki Lindhome	December 3, 2019
5	"Debby Ryan"	Riki Lindhome	December 10, 2019
6	"Richard Jefferson"	Riki Lindhome	December 17, 2019

== Reception ==
=== Critical response ===
Under a Rock received mostly positive critical reception. In a review for Paste, John-Michael Bond wrote, "Her sweet-natured lack of knowledge creates a space of equal power, free of the star-struck ass kissing of James Corden or Jimmy Fallon’s nonstop nostalgia parade. Most importantly, it’s not cruel or based on anything negative." Writing for Slashfilm, Ethan Anderton stated, "The weird part of this program is that Amazon and their Alexa assistant are clearly sponsoring the show, because they help out with musical cues, hints, information, and more. It’s a little forced, but Tig Notaro’s dry charm makes it all coalesce together into something awkwardly hilarious."

=== Accolades ===
The series was nominated for a 2020 Producers Guild of America Award in the Outstanding Short-Form Program category. The series won the Branded Content: Series award at the 10th Streamy Awards.
