= Andy Wood (comedian) =

American comedian, producer and actor

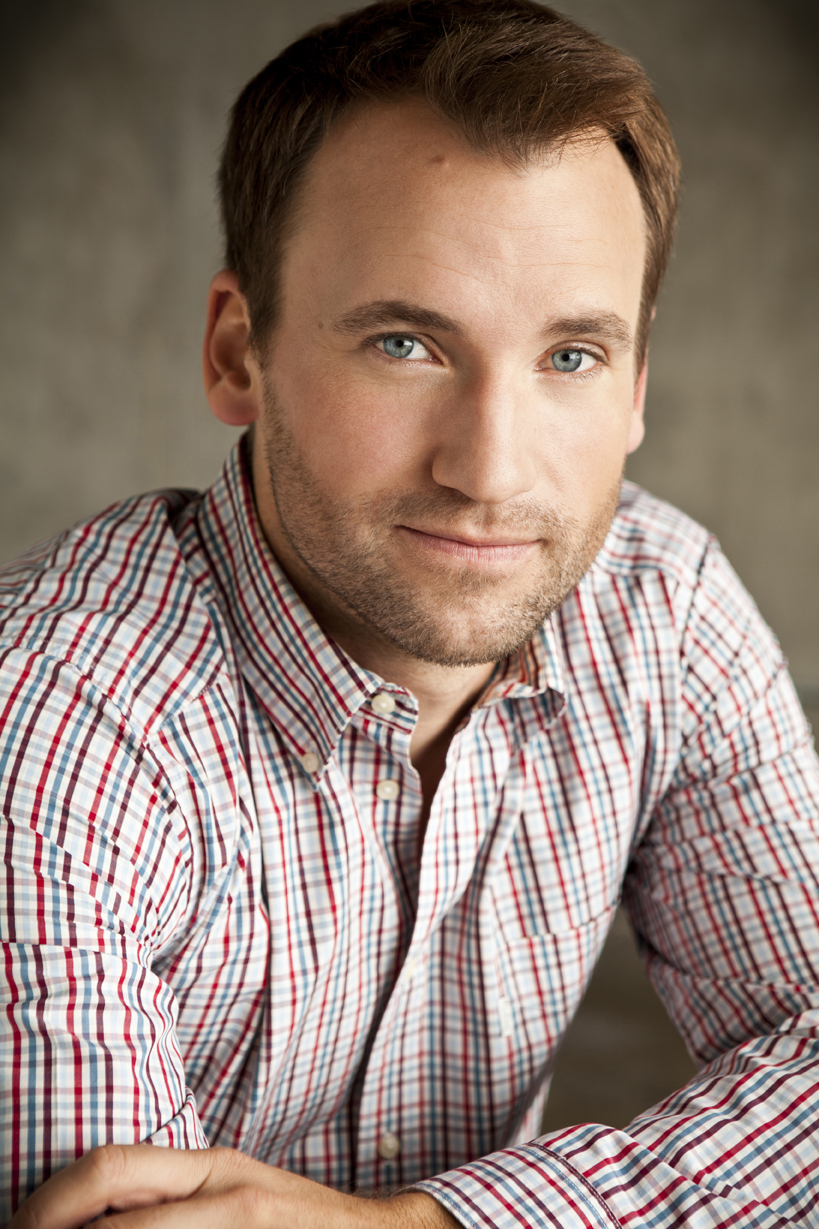
- Andrew "Andy" Wood
- Occupation: Stand-Up Comedian/Producer of Bridgetown Comedy Festival
- Years active: 2005 - Present

Andrew Wood (born 1977) is an American comedian and a founder/producer of Portland's Bridgetown Comedy Festival. He is a native of Ann Arbor, Michigan currently residing in Los Angeles, California.

== Standup comedy ==
Wood has performed at the Bumbershoot Arts Festival, the Seattle International Comedy Competition, the Portland Amateur Comedy Competition, SF Sketchfest and the Bentzen Ball. He has performed with comedy acts such as Patton Oswalt, Todd Glass, Doug Benson and Janeane Garofalo. He graduated from Huron High School (Ann Arbor, Michigan) in 1995 and took his degree in Electrical Engineering at Cornell University in 1999. Before he became a comedian, Wood was an engineer at Pixelworks.

== Probably Science ==
Wood is one of the hosts of the popular podcast Probably Science where he and other comedians talk about science news stories. While Wood does have a background in science, the podcast is meant for humor and entertainment and is not intended to provide accurate scientific information. He affectionately refers to the show as "Your week in half-assed science."

== Producer, The Bridgetown Comedy Festival ==
As tri-founder of the Festival, Wood is responsible in part for "the fastest-growing comedy extravaganza in America." Successively larger and better-planned comedy festivals prompted one reviewer to comment, ". . . as usual, organizer Andy Wood and his royal army of geniuses outdid themselves. How can you make something already great even better? I'm not sure, but it happened." In late 2009, the Portland Mercury reviewed the festival, stating that, "Bridgetown (or should we say, Andy Wood) is changing Portland comedy" and the following year, the Portland Monthly stated that Wood "deserves several rounds of applause for making the fest happen . . . ." In his work as a comedy promoter, Wood created a venue where the comedy market was struggling, and has promoted the venue to as a regional and national event. Part of Wood's approach in creating 'draw' to a weak comedy market was to couple art with philanthropy.

== Short history of the Bridgetown Comedy Festival ==
=== 2008 ===
In October 2007, comedians Andy Wood and Matt Braunger and comedy fan Kim Brady created a comedy festival based in Portland, Oregon with Patton Oswalt as the first headliner. Bridgetown hospitality coordinator Jen Lane joined the effort, suggesting Portland's Hawthorne district as the site. In addition to Oswalt, the 2008 Festival featured Tig Notaro (comedian, The Sarah Silverman Program); Matt Braunger (founder and Portland native); Morgan Murphy (writer, Late Night with Jimmy Fallon); Natasha Leggero (comedian, Reno 911!); and Chris Fairbanks (comedian, Fuel TV). The 2008 Festival garnered some sixty performers.

=== 2009 ===
The 2009 Bridgetown Comedy Festival was headlined by Janeane Garofalo (Saturday Night Live and The Larry Sanders Show alumnus), and featured Andy Kaufman Award-winners Reggie Watts and Brent Weinbach. It added long-form improv and podcasts to the schedule.

=== 2010 ===
The 2010 Festival featured 170 performers at nine venues and featured long-form improv, podcasts by comedian Marc Maron (and stand-up performance) and Jimmy Pardo, and comics including: Maria Bamford, Tim Meadows, Scott Adsit, Tig Notaro, Greg Behrendt, Christian Finnegan, Matt Besser, Matt Walsh, Matt Braunger, Danny Pudi, Steve Agee, T.J. Miller, and Hannibal Buress.

== Association ==
Wood joined the Phi Kappa Psi fraternity at Cornell University, and through that organization, the Irving Literary Society.
