= Professor Blastoff =

Comedy podcast

- Logo
- Genre: Comedy, science, philosophy, absurdism, improv, entertainment, talk
- Language: English

Cast and voices
- Hosted by: Tig Notaro, Kyle Dunnigan, David Huntsberger and guest host Aaron Burrell

Music
- Opening theme: "Professor Blastoff" Opening Theme by Tim Farrell
- Ending theme: "Welp, that's been podcast."

Production
- Production: Scott Aukerman
- Length: 60–90 minutes

Technical specifications
- Audio format: MP3

Publication
- No. of episodes: 217
- Original release: May 15, 2011 – July 21, 2015
- Provider: Earwolf Media
- Updates: Weekly
- License: Stitcher Radio

Reception
- Ratings: Charted in 4 countries

Related
- Website: www.professorblastoff.com

Professor Blastoff was a weekly comedy audio podcast, which was released every Tuesday and lasted four years from May 15, 2011 to July 21, 2015. It was hosted by comedians Tig Notaro, Kyle Dunnigan and David Huntsberger. The topics ranged from scientific, philosophical, metaphysical and humanitarian with guest host Aaron Burrell assisting in the research, who was also Tig's assistant at the time.

== History ==
The podcast was broadcast as part of the Earwolf comedy podcasting network, being recorded in studios owned by the company. In late 2012 and early 2013, the podcast went on tour across the U.S. and recorded live episodes at comedy festivals and small venues. The 100th episode was shot on camera. In 2015, Kyle reported that "Tig got too busy." So they decided to end it for good.

=== Theme song change ===
The first episodes of the podcast had a theme song by the hosts of the show, then in June 2011, podcast listener Tim Farrell submitted a new theme song that the show used until it ended.

=== Tig's diagnosis ===
In the Spring through Fall of 2012, Notaro was absent from a lot of the podcast episodes due to various sicknesses she experienced in a short time period, which she documented on her Grammy-nominated album, Live.

=== Streaming ===
The podcast could be streamed from the Earwolf website or downloaded from iTunes up until June 14, 2016, when it was switched to exclusively being hosted by Stitcher Radio.

== Guests ==
Many notable people in the world of comedy, music, television and film have appeared on the podcast, including Amy Schumer, Ira Glass, Aisha Tyler, Pete Holmes, and Marc Maron.

== Format ==
The backstory of how the podcast came to be was that a scientist, Professor R.L. Blastoff, Ph.D., got lost in space and reports back findings to his abandoned basement, or the "Hatch," via radio signal and determines the subject of each episode. At the beginning of each episode, Aaron dialed into the signal to see what they will discuss that day after the hosts updated the listeners about what was going on in their lives. Then, the guest was introduced and is either an expert in the field of the subject or very interested in talking about it. As the conversation goes on, Kyle is usually riffing on his various characters and impressions, Tig is being silly, and David is trying to keep everyone on track of getting back to the subject.

== Features ==
Throughout the show's history, Kyle introduced his various impressions and skits such as Donald Trump, Tim Gunn, Bill Maher, Swamp Rock, the game show Name that Punky, Mother Meditations, Top-shelf Thoughts, Knockout Ball, and improvised raps using only noises from his body.

== Reception ==
The podcast has charted in the following countries: United Kingdom, United States, Canada and Australia.
