= Aparna Nancherla =

American comedian and actress

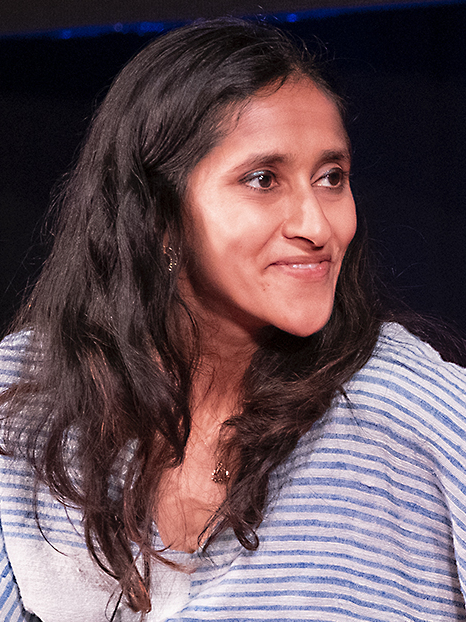
- Nancherla in 2019
- Born: Washington, D.C., U.S.
- Education: Amherst College (BA)

Comedy career
- Years active: 2004–present
- Medium: Stand-up, television
- Genres: Observational comedy, deadpan
- Website: Official website

Aparna Nancherla is an American stand-up comedian and actress. She has had recurring roles on television series including BoJack Horseman and Corporate and has written for Late Night with Seth Meyers and Totally Biased with W. Kamau Bell. Nancherla released her debut comedy album Just Putting It Out There through Tig Notaro's Bentzen Ball Records on July 8, 2016. Her memoir, Unreliable Narrator: Me, Myself and Imposter Syndrome, was released by Penguin Random House on September 19, 2023.

== Early life ==
Aparna Nancherla was born in Washington, D.C., United States into an Indian Telugu Hindu family; her parents immigrated to the United States from Hyderabad, India in the 1970s. She has an older sibling, Bhavana.

She grew up outside Washington, attending Thomas Jefferson High School for Science and Technology in Fairfax County, Virginia. Nancherla attended Amherst College in Amherst, Massachusetts and studied psychology. She graduated in 2005.

== Career ==
After college she returned to Washington, D.C., where she began her standup career. Nancherla moved to Los Angeles, then to New York City to write for Totally Biased until the show's cancellation in 2013. Nancherla was subsequently a staff writer for Late Night with Seth Meyers in 2015.

Nancherla's credits also include several web series, including Your Main Thing with John Early, and co-created and starred in Womanhood, a satirical advice series with comedian Jo Firestone.

=== Appearances ===
==== Live-action ====
Nancherla has appeared on Conan and Comedy Central's The Meltdown with Jonah and Kumail. Variety named her to its list of "Top 10 Comics to Watch for 2016" and The New York Times said that Nancherla "has become a comic in demand for her quirky, relatable and punchy humor." She is also the co-host of Blue Woman Group, which the Daily Beast calls "a hilarious podcast about depression."

In 2016, Comedy Central announced that Nancherla would record a half-hour special for the network.

In 2017, she played a ramen blogger in season two of Master of None, had a recurring role in the first two seasons of the HBO series Crashing, which aired from 2017 to 2018, and played Grace in the Comedy Central series Corporate, which aired from 2017 to 2020.

In March 2018 she appeared on the Netflix series The Standups. She also made her feature debut in the 2018 film A Simple Favor.

In 2019 she was featured in Laughing Matters, a 30-minute YouTube documentary created by SoulPancake in collaboration with Funny or Die wherein a variety of comedians discuss mental health.

In 2020, she appeared on the Netflix series Space Force as Pella Bhat. She also delivered a TED Talk, "The Joy of Taking Out The Trash".

On January 17, 2024, Nancherla was one of the panelist-contestants on the premiere episode of After Midnight with Taylor Tomlinson.

In December 2025, the comedy streaming service Dropout released Nancherla's first full-length special, Hopeful Potato.

==== Voice acting ====
In 2017, she voiced Kishy in the short-lived animated series Ginger Snaps.

In seasons four, five and six of BoJack Horseman, from 2017 to 2020, Nancherla had a recurring voice role as BoJack's half-sister Hollyhock. She also voiced Mrs. Singh in Fancy Nancy from 2018 to 2022.

In the fifth season of Steven Universe, Nancherla voiced Nephrite and several Jades. In the Bob's Burgers season 9 episode "UFO No You Didn't", which aired in December 2018, she voiced Susmita, Tina's science partner. She returned to voice Susmita in the "Fast Time Capsules at Wagstaff School" episode.

From 2020 to 2022, she voiced the recurring character Meena in the Disney Junior series Mira, Royal Detective.

Since January 2021, she has voiced Moon Tobin in the Fox animated series The Great North. In October 2021, she voiced the guest character Sheela in The Ghost and Molly McGee.

In 2022, Nancherla voiced Chelsea Hill in the adult animated series Fairview, She also provided guest voices for the series Central Park, and supporting characters such as Oddjobs and Opie in Summer Camp Island.

In March 2023, she voiced a librarian named Miss Moufflé in Kiff. She also voiced Snail in an animated adaptation of Frog and Toad.

== Filmography ==
=== Film ===
Year	Title	Role	Notes
2018	A Simple Favor	Sona	
2020	Golden Arm	Coco Cherie	
2021	7 Days	Swathi	Voice
2022	The Drop	Mia	
2023	Molli and Max in the Future	Rachel	
2023	Chris Fleming: Hell	Additional characters	Comedy special on Peacock
2023	Baby Shark's Big Movie!	Gillie	Voice
2024	Orion and the Dark	Quiet	Voice
2024	Unfrosted	Purvis Pendleton	
2025	Another Simple Favor	Sona	
2026	Hoppers	Nisha	Voice

=== Television ===
Year	Title	Role	Notes
2012–2013	Totally Biased with W. Kamau Bell	Herself, various	9 episodes; also writer
2014	The Chris Gethard Show	Scrompin Nompin Nompin	Episode: "The Crowd Sourced Character Contest 3"
2015	The Jim Gaffigan Show	Herself	Episode: "Go Shorty, It's Your Birthday"
2016	Netflix Presents: The Characters	Aparna	Episode: "Natasha Rothwell"
2016	Inside Amy Schumer	Aparna, Barista	2 episodes
2016	Nightcap	Herself	Episode: "IBS-ISIS"
2017	Love	Lauren	Episode: "Friends Night Out"
2017	Master of None	Stephanie	Episode: "First Date"
2017	Ginger Snaps	Kishy	Voice, 10 episodes
2017	HarmonQuest	Beauflecks DeVrye	Episode: "Bonebreak Village"
2017–2019	Crashing	Anaya	6 episodes
2017–2020	BoJack Horseman	Hollyhock	Voice, 13 episodes
2018	2 Dope Queens		Episode: "Hair"
2018	High Maintenance	Daria	Episode: "#goalz"
2018	Animals.	Dawn	Voice, episode: "At a Loss for Words When We Needed Them Most or... The Rise and Fall of GrabBagVille"
2018	Steven Universe	Jades, Nephrite	Voice, 2 episodes
2018–2024	Bob's Burgers	Susmita	Voice, 5 episodes
2018–2020	Corporate	Grace Ramaswamy	22 episodes
2018–2020	The Boss Baby: Back In Business	Frankie	Voice, 45 episodes
2018–2021	Fancy Nancy	Priya Singh	Voice, 3 episodes
2019	You're Not a Monster	Nia Emissiona	Voice, 10 episodes
2019	Helpsters	Astronaut Amrita	Episode: "Dancer Dave/Astronaut Amrita"
2020	Mythic Quest: Raven's Banquet	Michelle	5 episodes; also writer and co-producer
2020	Earth to Ned	Aparna	Episode: "Late Night Ned"
2020	Love Life	Naomi	Episode: "Magnus Lund"
2020–2022	Mira, Royal Detective	Meena / various	Voice, 23 episodes
2020–2022	Space Force	Pella Bhat	4 episodes
2020–2023	Summer Camp Island	Oddjobs, Opie	Voice, 6 episodes
2021	Modern Love	Vanessa	Episode: "The Night Girl Finds a Day Boy"
2021	Tig n' Seek	Amritha	Voice, episode: "Nuritza Sees It All"
2021–2025	The Great North	Moon Tobin	Voice, main role
2021–2024	The Ghost and Molly McGee	Sheela	Voice, recurring role
2022	Search Party	Dr. Benny Balthazar	5 episodes
2022	Fairview	Chelsea Hill	Voice, recurring role
2022	The Boss Baby: Back in the Crib	Frankie	Voice, episode: "Techy Tykes"
2022	Tuca & Bertie	Beth	Voice, episode: "Somebirdy's Getting Married"
2022	Central Park	Dr. Alyna Rao	Voice, 2 episodes
2022	Ziwe	Tara / Melissa	2 episodes
2022–2023	Lopez vs Lopez	Dr. Pocha	Recurring cast
2023	Single Drunk Female	Kenzie	Episode: "Normie"
2023	Kiff	Ms. Moufflé / various	Voice, 2 episodes
2023	What We Do in the Shadows	Aparna	Episode: "The Campaign"
2023	Frog and Toad	Snail	Voice, 6 episodes
2024	Abbott Elementary	Caroline	Episode: "Smoking"
2024	After Midnight	Herself	2 episodes
2025	Dirty Laundry	Herself	Episode: "Who Stole Fire Extinguishers From a Hotel?"
2026	MP3	Chia	3 episodes

== Works and books ==
- Nancherla, Aparna (November 28, 2016). "Comedian Aparna Nancherla on Having Compassion in the Face of Bigotry". Broadly.
- Nancherla, Aparna (published September 19, 2023). "Unreliable Narrator: Me, Myself, and Impostor Syndrome". Viking.

== Discography ==
- Just Putting It Out There (2016) – CD/Download
