= Dutton's Books =

Former bookstore chain in California

Coordinates: 34.164211°N 118.395707°W

Dutton's Books was an independent bookstore chain in the Greater Los Angeles area. Bill and Thelma Dutton opened the first shop on New Year's Day 1961, in a former liquor store on the corner of Laurel Canyon Boulevard and Magnolia Boulevard in North Hollywood. Dave Dutton took over the bookstore from his parents in 1975 and later expanded it to fill three adjoining storefronts.

The store carried a substantial selection of used and rare books, eventually filling the North Hollywood location with 350,000 new and used titles. It operated four locations: two in the San Fernando Valley (North Hollywood/Valley Village and Burbank), one in Brentwood (opened 1984), and one in Beverly Hills (opened 2004). The Brentwood location, housed in the Barry Building, was designated a Los Angeles Historic-Cultural Monument in 2007. The Beverly Hills branch closed in 2006, the Burbank location closed in 2005, the North Hollywood location closed in 2006, and the Brentwood location closed in 2008.

Bill and Thelma Dutton opened the first shop on New Year’s Day 1961, in a former liquor store on the corner of Laurel Canyon Boulevard and Magnolia Boulevard. In the mid-70s, their son Dave and his wife Judy took over that store and a second Burbank location, offering such unique services as book buyback, book signings, and in-store reading events with community authors. The store provided books for various movies and television shows.

In 1984 Judy & Dave's brother, Doug Dutton, opened a third location in Brentwood, California that included a staff poet in Scott Wannberg. In 2004 Doug opened a fourth location in Beverly Hills, California.

As with most independent bookstores, the impact of Amazon led to the closing of the Burbank store in 2005, Valley Village in 2006, Beverly Hills in 2007, and finally Brentwood in 2008. The loss of Dutton's was a blow to customers and authors alike; among them Carolyn See, Mona Simpson, Jodie Foster, Dustin Hoffman, Richard Price and Roger Corman.
