= Tig Notaro: Boyish Girl Interrupted =

2015 comedy special by Tig Notaro

- Poster
- Genre: Comedy
- Written by: Tig Notaro
- Directed by: Jay Karas & Tig Notaro
- Starring: Tig Notaro
- Country of origin: United States
- Original language: English

Production
- Executive producers: Tig Notaro; Mike Farah; Betsy Koch; Hunter Seidman; Anna Wagner
- Cinematography: Rhet Bear
- Running time: 55 minutes
- Production company: Funny or Die

Original release
- Network: HBO
- Release: August 22, 2015

Tig Notaro: Boyish Girl Interrupted is the first hour-long comedy special from Tig Notaro that premiered on HBO on August 22, 2015. The special was recorded on May 31, 2015 at the Wilbur Theatre in Boston. In 2016, Tig’s record label Bentzen Ball Records and Secretly Canadian released an audio album version of the special on CD, download and vinyl. The album is dedicated to the memory of Susie Cusack, Tig’s mother.

== Reception ==
"The sound of her voice, located somewhere between dry and monotone, has an oddly calming affect," wrote Corinne Cummings at Rolling Stone magazine.

== Awards ==
The special was nominated at the 68th Primetime Emmy Awards for Outstanding Writing for a Variety Special in 2016.

In 2017, the album was nominated for the Grammy Award for Best Comedy Album at the 59th Annual Grammy Awards.

== Album ==
Boyish Girl Interrupted

Live album by Tig Notaro
- Released: August 5, 2016
- Recorded: May 31, 2015
- Venue: Wilbur Theatre
- Genre: Comedy
- Length: 53:21
- Label: Bentzen Ball Records / Secretly Canadian

Tig Notaro chronology
Live (2012)	Boyish Girl Interrupted (2016)	'Happy To Be Here' (2018)

=== Track listing ===
No.	Title	Length
1.	"The Rug"	1:44
2.	"Vegas"	8:50
3.	"Where's Tig?"	0:52
4.	"Searching for Santa"	6:00
5.	"Laugh Noises"	3:59
6.	"Mississippi Relatives"	3:58
7.	"Tombstone"	3:20
8.	"Cancer"	2:33
9.	"TSA"	2:50
10.	"Topless"	1:24
11.	"Private Jet"	1:37
12.	"Emergency Exit"	1:54
13.	"Public Pool"	3:22
14.	"ETA"	1:58
15.	"Standing O"	1:32
16.	"When I'm 64"	2:05
17.	"6th Grade Music Class"	5:21

=== Credits ===
- Engineer – Bob Aldridge
- FOH Mixer – Jim Hores
- Pro Tools – Chris Prinzivalli
- A2 – Chris Van Drie
