= In a World... =

2013 comedy film by Lake Bell

- Theatrical release poster
- Directed by: Lake Bell
- Written by: Lake Bell
- Produced by: Eddie Vaisman; Jett Steiger; Lake Bell; Mark Roberts
- Starring: Lake Bell; Demetri Martin; Fred Melamed; Rob Corddry; Michaela Watkins; Ken Marino; Nick Offerman; Tig Notaro
- Cinematography: Seamus Tierney
- Edited by: Tom McArdle
- Music by: Ryan Miller
- Production companies: 3311 Productions; More Films; Team G
- Distributed by: Roadside Attractions (United States); Sony Pictures Releasing International (International)
- Release dates: January 20, 2013 (Sundance); August 9, 2013 (United States)
- Running time: 93 minutes
- Country: United States
- Language: English
- Budget: <$1 million
- Box office: $3.1 million

In a World... is a 2013 American comedy film written, directed, starring, and co-produced by Lake Bell. The film stars Bell as a vocal coach who does voice-overs for film trailers. The film co-stars Demetri Martin, Fred Melamed, Rob Corddry, Michaela Watkins, Ken Marino, Nick Offerman, and Tig Notaro.

The film debuted at 2013 Sundance Film Festival in January and had its international debut at Sundance London in April before an August 2013 theatrical release. The film grossed $3.1 million against a production budget of less than $1 million. Most of the gross was domestic. Bell presents the subject matter as a lifelong interest and a natural pursuit based on her life experiences; she spent several years writing the film's script.

The film received positive reviews from critics and accolades from institutions such as the Sundance Film Festival and the National Board of Review.

== Plot ==
The film opens with an homage of footage of the late voice-over trailblazer Don LaFontaine. Sam Sotto is a Hollywood actor who is known as "king of voice-overs" for his extensive narration and voice-over work. With a recently published autobiography, he is about to receive a lifetime achievement award upon turning 60. His 31-year-old daughter, Carol Solomon, is a struggling vocal coach who has always been overshadowed by her father. She agrees to help Eva Longoria to loop her accent as a British mob boss wife. Sam forces Carol to move out of his house so that he can live with his girlfriend Jamie, who is a year younger than her. Carol leaves to stay with her older sister Dani and her husband Moe.

An upcoming film series, The Amazon Games, plans to bring back the "In a world..." line made famous by LaFontaine. The trailer voice-over is highly sought after. Sam bows out so that his friend and heir-apparent, Gustav Warner, can assume the role, but Gustav develops laryngitis and fails to show up to a temp track recording. Carol happens to be at the studio doing other work with engineer Louis, and she substitutes for Gustav. Katherine Huling, the series' executive producer, decides she wants Carol for the job instead. She also gets other voice-over work, but she neglects to tell her self-absorbed father about her newfound success. Gustav and Sam feel entitled and are dismissive of the unknown woman who "stole" the job from them.

Carol visits Dani at the hotel where she works as concierge. Intrigued by the voice of a flirtatious Irish guest, she asks Dani to interview and record him for her voice archive. During the interview, Dani pretends to be single. Carol joins Sam and Jamie at a party at Gustav's mansion. Gustav flirts with her, and she ends up staying the night. While waiting for Dani to come home from work, Moe listens to the recording of her interview with the hotel guest and is shocked at her lie. He leaves the apartment after Dani arrives.

Rumors spread quickly about Carol and Gustav. Gustav boasts to Sam of his night with some party-crasher, and when he learns she is the woman in competition for the job, he decides to keep pursuing her, still not fully realizing who she is. Sam and Jamie host a meal for his daughters. It comes out that Carol is the mystery woman in the running for the coveted job. He is indignant, furious at Gustav, and dismissive of Carol, causing her to leave angry. Sam vows to compete for the job himself. Dani is distraught about her husband, and Carol secretly records her anguish, sending the message to Moe to help win him back.

Competition for the job heats up. All three must send recordings for the studio to decide among. Carol is ready to drop out, but Louis champions her cause, also explaining that he likes her. She admits she likes him, too. They work together to produce the audition recording, then party together afterwards. At the end of the night, Louis finally kisses Carol.

Though Carol is still angry at her father, Moe insists that she and Dani go to the Golden Trailer Awards, where Sam is due to receive a lifetime achievement award. There the trailer for The Amazon Games is revealed; Carol got the job and is elated. Sam storms off and Jamie berates him, threatening to leave him if he does not grow up and show support for his daughters. During his acceptance speech, Sam is magnanimous in victory, dedicating the award to his daughters. In the ladies room, Carol encounters Huling, who bluntly tells her that she was not the best person for the job, but was chosen for the greater meaning of having a woman in that role. Carol goes back to her work as a voice coach, helping low self-esteem, high-pitched, squeaky-voiced women to speak less like a "baby doll" or "sexy baby" and be taken more seriously as mature women, using her voice-over on The Amazon Games trailer as their inspiration.

== Cast ==
- Lake Bell as Carol Solomon
- Fred Melamed as Sam Sotto
- Michaela Watkins as Dani Solomon
- Ken Marino as Gustav Warner
- Demetri Martin as Louis
- Rob Corddry as Moe
- Alexandra Holden as Jamie
- Nick Offerman as Heners
- Geena Davis as Katherine Huling
- Eva Longoria as herself
- Tig Notaro as Cher
- Stephanie Allynne as Nancy
- Jason O'Mara as Mr. Pouncer
- Talulah Riley as Pippa
- Melissa Disney as Melinda Chisney
- Olya Milova as Mimi
- Corsica Wilson as Stacy
- Yelena Protsenko as Alla
- Carly Chaikin as Excruciating
- Janicza Bravo as Snacks
- Marc Graue as himself
- Joe Cipriano as himself
- Mark Elliott as himself
- Don LaFontaine as himself (archival footage)
- Cameron Diaz as herself (uncredited)
- Jeff Garlin as himself (uncredited)

== Production ==
The film stars Bell as Carol Solomon, a vocal coach intent on doing voice-over work for film trailers. The film's title was inspired by the phrase used by Don LaFontaine to start many film trailers. According to Bell, almost no notable film trailers have employed female voice-over talent except for Gone in 60 Seconds (2000), which used Melissa Disney. Bell's claim was supported by a rough survey of trailer producers published in The Kansas City Star by Andy Isaacson of The New York Times. Bell had been intrigued that the prototypical "omniscient" voice behind film trailers was male. This inspired her to write a story in which a female protagonist sought to overcome this prejudice, resulting in her feature-length writing, directing, and producing debut. The film's script built on Bell's lifelong interest in the nuances of voices, accents, dialects and speech patterns. Her production role and directorial performance built upon her time spent watching crews set up scenes rather than relaxing in her trailer.

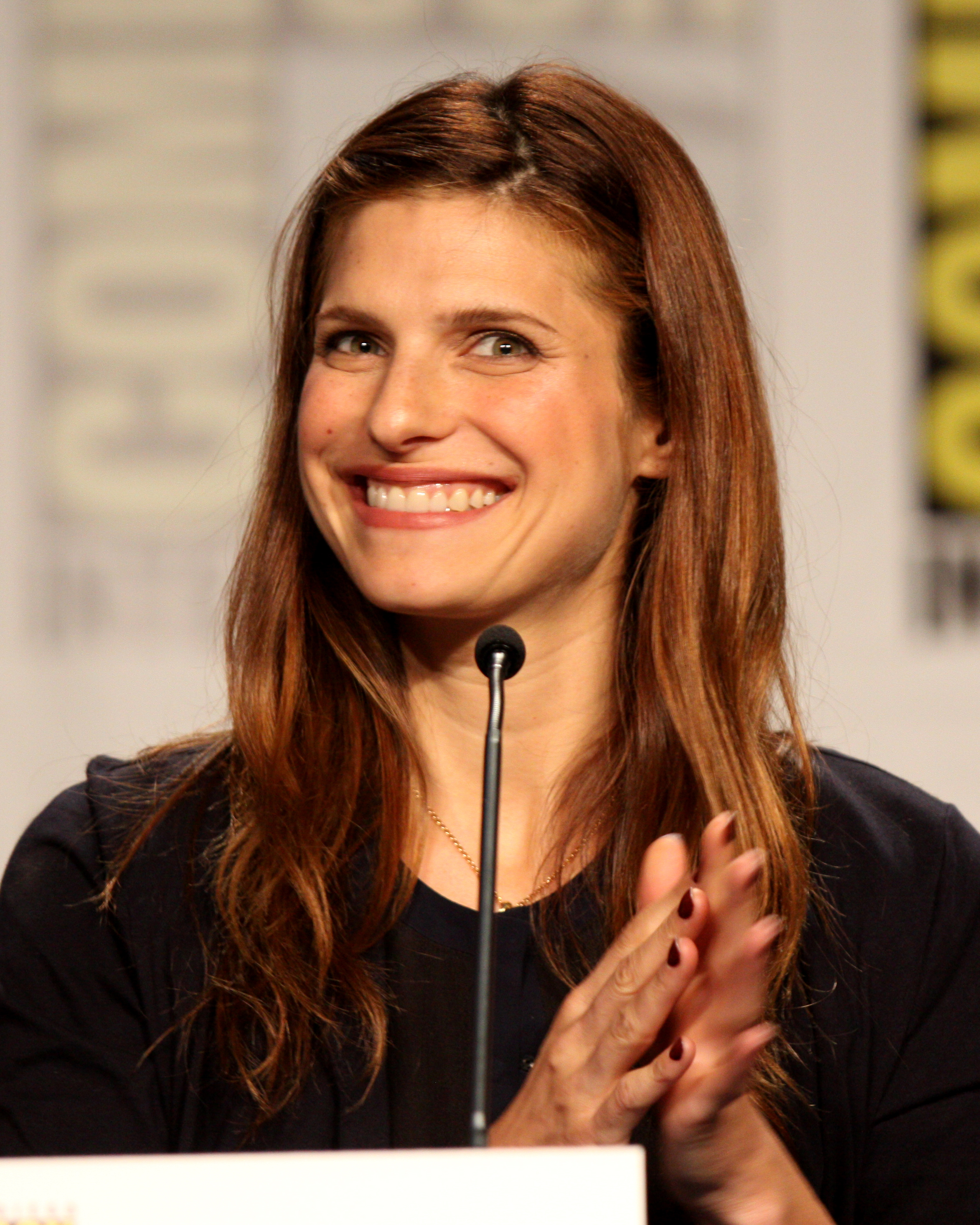
In 2011, Lake Bell experimented with directing by directing a short.

Bell spent years tinkering with the script before letting anyone see it. Then, she repeatedly rewrote the screenplay for submission to her acting agent to be shopped for a director. Eventually after an unfruitful pursuit, the agent explained that Bell should just direct it herself. This overwhelmed her, so they decided she should write and direct a short, resulting in Worst Enemy (2011) whose Sundance admission gave her the confidence to direct. Bell wrote the screenplay with particular people in mind, hoping they would be interested in the project, explaining, "I was inspired to cast not only people who are great comedians but [...] who have a complex life [...] I knew that there was a profundity there that I wanted to tap into." However, Notaro's part was originally written for a male. The parts were drawn from acquaintances, friends, family and herself. Bell also recruited her then boyfriend Scott Cambell as an art assistant for the film.

Although production took a total of seven months, filming was limited to 20 days in Los Angeles. Although filmed in Los Angeles, Bell purposefully avoided including iconic local elements as much as possible. Nonetheless, locations include the following: The Scientology Celebrity Center, The California Club, The Millennium Biltmore Hotel lobby, and KCET Studios. Bell did extensive preparation work before the film, bringing lengthy notes. She counts The King of Comedy, Hannah and her Sisters, Bob & Carol & Ted & Alice and Citizen Ruth as cinematic inspirations. She considered Martin Scorsese, Woody Allen, Alexander Payne, Thomas McCarthy, Miranda July, Jay Duplass and Mark Duplass as directorial inspirations. She filmed using shots in the style of a drama, although the film is a comedy. The "nose kiss" scene was suggested by Ken Marino, and it made Bell laugh so much she told him he would need to do it twice. The film's score was written by Ryan Miller of Guster and was released on September 24, 2013.

== Release ==
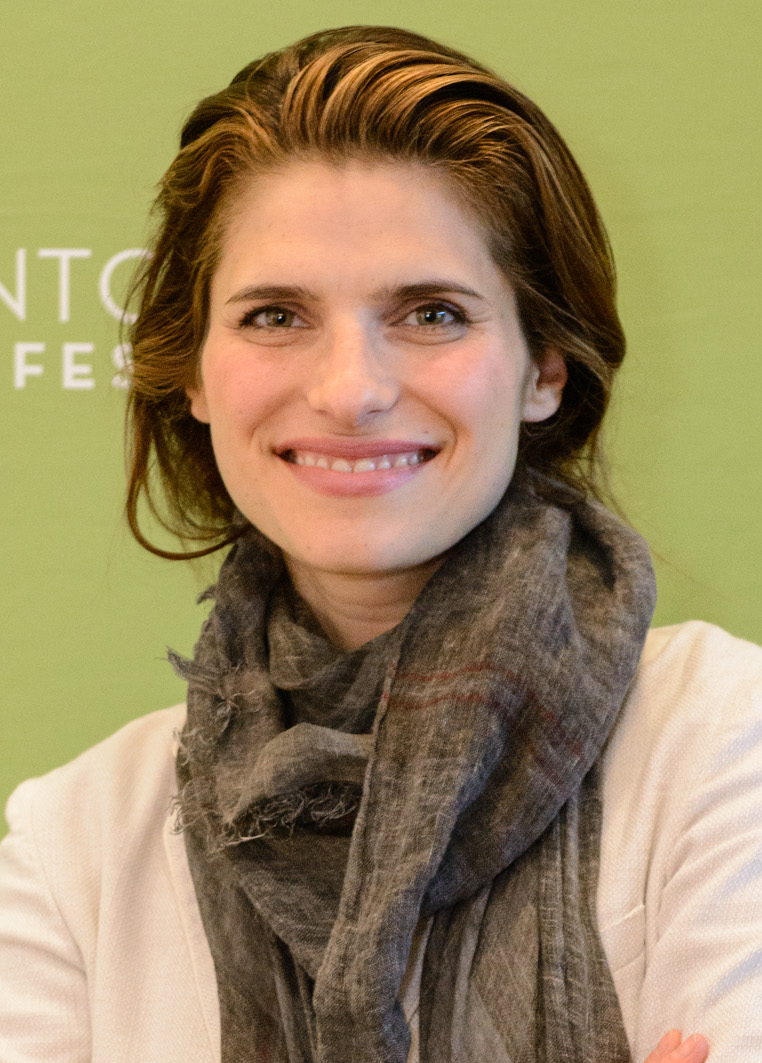
Bell in 2013 when In a World... marked her feature film writing, directing and producing debut.

The film was well received at the January 26, 2013 Sundance Film Festival ceremony, winning the U.S. Dramatic Screenwriting Award. In February, it was picked up by Roadside Attractions for North American domestic distribution, and by Sony Pictures Worldwide Acquisitions for international distribution. The film had its international premier at the April 25–28, 2013 Sundance London. Its DVD release date was January 21, 2014.

== Reception ==
=== Box office ===
The film opened in three theaters on August 9, 2013, with a total gross of $70,980, making it the weekend's number one in terms of overall per-theater-average gross ($23,660). Roadside Attractions planned to gradually expand, and roll-out the film to more theatres. The final worldwide gross was $3.1 million ($4.28 million in 2025). Sources agree that the domestic total was $2.96 million ($4.09 million in 2025) but differ on whether the international total was $175,940 ($243174 in 2025) or $151,051 ($208774 in 2025). The film also had gross domestic video sales of $627,211 ($866895 in 2025). The production budget was approximately $1 million ($1.38 million in 2025).

=== Critical response ===
Review-aggregation website Rotten Tomatoes gives the film a score of 92% based on 130 reviews. The site's consensus is, "A funny, well-written screwball satire for film buffs, In a World... proves an auspicious beginning for writer, director, and star Lake Bell." Metacritic gives the film a weighted average score of 79/100 based on reviews from 30 critics, indicating "generally favorable" reviews. This was the second highest Metacritic score for a comedy film in 2013. According to polls conducted by CinemaScore, audiences gave the film a B+ rating, on a scale from A to F.

A.O. Scott of The New York Times praised Bell's performance for its "blend of diffidence, goofiness and charm" as well as the deceptively "complex and ambitious" result of her writing and directing insights. While noting that Bell is a former contributor to the publication, The Hollywood Reporter's Todd McCarthy comments that the film is "a lively, sometimes very funny comedy" that offers an "amusing peek into a seldom-visited corner of showbiz," that is the world of Hollywood voice-over talent. McCarthy describes Sam as "genial and intimidating" and Carol as a "charming, neurotic live wire" who is also "shapely and quick-witted". Carol "has great delivery herself and is wonderful with accents and dialects," according to McCarthy. McCarthy notes that "all the actors pop with well-defined personalities," but that Melamed "formidably dominates" the film. British critic Mark Kermode praised the film for its "sharp and very snarky" humor, said it "has just enough bite, and stays on the right side of bitter," and reserved special praise for Melamed, whose performance he called "absolutely brilliant". He also praised Bell for avoiding the smug, self-serving insider view that other Hollywood films fall foul to, and the well observed characters, and although he does not think it will be a huge hit, says he thinks it deserves to do well. According to National Public Radio, the comedy, has an underlying "moving story about female empowerment," with Bell's character Carol serving as voice-over industry counterpart to Rocky Balboa. John Anderson of Variety notes the picture achieves its most important goal of making the voiceover industry something of interest to a broad audience. He describes it as "a rollicking laffer about the cutthroat voiceover biz in Los Angeles" and "a film with too many laugh lines to be absorbed in one sitting." Anderson describes Bell as a "magnetic, intelligent, blithely screwball leading lady in the Carole Lombard tradition." Claudia Puig of USA Today noted that the film employed both a "fresh premise and convincing characters" and praised its deceptive simplicity in blending multiple genres (adult daughter–aging father relationship, a late-blooming coming-of-age tale, a lively satire, a sweet romantic comedy and a subtly inspiring feminist saga). Betsy Sharkey of the Los Angeles Times found the film endearing despite its flaws that included an "out of sorts" lead. In a review for in The Independent Geoffrey Macnab describes the film as a surprising delight and triumph supported by Bell's "refreshingly subtle and understated" directing and "well-written" indie script.

In Slate, Jessica Grose criticized Bell for reinforcing the negative association of women and high rising terminal—which, citing linguist Mark Liberman, she argued is not found to be more exhibited by women than by men—and vocal fry register—even though Bell also advocates that women speak lower than their natural voice, which contributes to vocal fry—writing, "what she's advocating is that women should have low voices to sound smart, or even sexy. Since she obviously cares about advancing women, maybe she should stop instructing them that they need to sound like dudes." At Collider, Matt Goldberg describes the film as a "rambling mess" that somehow won him over despite its poor pacing, scrambled plot and lack of depth.

=== Accolades ===
In a World... won U.S. Dramatic Screenwriting Award at the 2013 Sundance Film Festival, where it debuted on January 20. Bell said she felt she had already won simply by being accepted for competition at Sundance. Bell was nominated for Best First Screenplay at the 2014 Spirit Awards. Bell was honored with the Breakthrough of the Year Award (shared with Joshua Oppenheimer—The Act of Killing) and was listed in the Best Actress top 10 honorees by the Dublin Film Critics' Circle.

The film was recognized by the National Board of Review as one of its top 10 independent films of 2013.

Year	Award	Category	Recipients	Result
2013	Sundance Film Festival	Best Screenplay	Lake Bell	Won
2013	Dublin Film Critics' Circle Awards	Breakthrough of the Year	Lake Bell (co- with Joshua Oppenheimer)	Won
2014	Alliance of Women Film Journalists Awards	Best Woman Director	Lake Bell	Nominated
2014	Alliance of Women Film Journalists Awards	Best Woman Screenwriter	Lake Bell	Nominated
2014	Independent Spirit Film Awards	Best First Screenplay	Lake Bell	Nominated
