= Mr. Birchum =

Animated television series

- Genre: Animated sitcom
- Created by: Adam Carolla
- Developed by: Adam Carolla; Nate Adams; Mike Lynch
- Showrunners: Adam Carolla; Nate Adams
- Voices of: Adam Carolla; Megyn Kelly; Alonzo Bodden; Tyler Fischer; Brett Cooper; Kyle Dunnigan; Marisol Ramirez; James Arnold Taylor; Melissa Greenspan; Brandon Tyler Harris; Roseanne Barr; Jay Mohr; Patrick Warburton
- Composer: Bleeding Fingers Music
- Country of origin: United States
- Original language: English
- No. of seasons: 1
- No. of episodes: 6

Production
- Executive producers: Adam Carolla; Mike August; Nate Adams; Dallas Sonnier; Jeremy Boreing; Caleb Robinson; Ben Shapiro
- Editor: Quique Ríos Benavent
- Running time: 28 minutes
- Production companies: Chassy Media; Wise Blue Studios

Original release
- Network: DailyWire+
- Release: May 12 – June 9, 2024

Related
- Crank Yankers

Mr. Birchum is an American adult animated sitcom created by Adam Carolla and developed by him, Nate Adams, and Mike Lynch for DailyWire+. Produced by Chassy Media, the series premiered on May 12, 2024. Carolla stars as the titular character, alongside a voice cast including Megyn Kelly, Alonzo Bodden, Tyler Fischer, Brett Cooper, Kyle Dunnigan, Marisol Ramirez, James Arnold Taylor, Melissa Greenspan, Brandon Tyler Harris, Roseanne Barr, Jay Mohr, and Patrick Warburton.

Carolla originated the character of Dick Birchum in the 1990s where he featured on KROQ-FM, later voicing him in the series Crank Yankers.

== Synopsis ==
The series chronicles the lives of the Birchum family, Richard (Adam Carolla), Wendi (Megyn Kelly), Eddie (Kyle Dunnigan) and Jeanie (Brett Cooper). Each episode is a social commentary on modern American culture from a politically conservative viewpoint as Richard attempts to keep life in his hometown simple.

== Cast and characters ==
=== Main cast ===
- Adam Carolla as Richard Birchum, a woodshop teacher who was originally a substitute, but he took the full-time position to secure health coverage for his family.
  - Adam Carolla also voices himself in a cameo appearance in the episode "This Means War-ranty", in which Richard confuses him for Gilbert Gottfried.
- Megyn Kelly as Wendi Birchum, a realtor and Jeanie's mother.
- Alonzo Bodden as Don Gage, Richard's best friend, a Navy veteran, and the auto shop teacher who got Richard his teaching job.
- Tyler Fischer as Elliot Karponzi, a political correctness officer and Star Wars fan who dislikes Richard. Many speculate this character is visually based on leftist YouTube personality Vaush.
- Brett Cooper as Jeanie Birchum, Wendi's daughter and Richard's stepdaughter. She idolizes her stepdad and dreams of being a professional contractor.
- Kyle Dunnigan as Eddie Birchum, Richard's son and a professional gamer and YouTuber.
- Velvet Wonder as Velvet, a student of Richard's, but also Eddie Birchum's best friend and gaming channel partner.
- Marisol Ramirez
- James Arnold Taylor as Brad
- Melissa Greenspan as Bentley
- Brandon Tyler Harris
- Roseanne Barr as Principal Pam Bortles
- Jay Mohr as Coach Murphy
- Patrick Warburton as Burly Man

=== Guests ===
- Rob Riggle as Gunderson (in "Thank You for Your Meal Service")
- Sage Steele as Deena Gage (in "Thank You for Your Meal Service")
- Danny Trejo as Switchblade (in "Oh, the Humanity")

== Production ==
In 2011, Adam Carolla pitched a spinoff series to Crank Yankers to Fox that would center on his character Dick Birchum, but the series was not picked up.

Sage Steele replaced Candace Owens in the cast after Owens departed from the Daily Wire after a period of tension resulting from her criticism of the Gaza war.

== Pilot ==
Title	Written and directed by	Original release date
"The Birchums"	Adam Carolla & Kevin Hench	2011

== Series ==
No.	Title	Directed by	Written by	Original release date
1	"Welcome Back, Birchum!"	Nate Adams	Mark Hoffmeier & Mike Lynch	May 12, 2024
As the school year begins, Birchum and Gage wager on which of them will receive the first insult from a student. The school introduces a new JEDI (Justice, Equity, Diversity, and Inclusion) officer named Karponzi, who quickly becomes Birchum's antagonist. After Birchum puts his students to work refinishing his deck at home without their parents' knowledge, Karponzi reports him to a disciplinary tribunal. In a subplot, Wendi clashes with Jeanie over a house she is attempting to sell.
2	"Thank You for Your Meal Service"	Manuel Morales & Nate Adams	Mark Hoffmeier & Mike Lynch	May 12, 2024
Birchum and his fellow Navy veterans spend Veterans Day hopping between restaurants and bars to collect free food and drinks, dubbing themselves "Meal Team Six." Their outing is complicated when a rival group of retired Army veterans pursues the same freebies. Separately, Eddie works to improve Wendi's online presence in order to attract buyers to her real estate listing.
3	"This Means War-ranty"	Manuel Morales & Nate Adams	Mike Lynch	May 19, 2024
Karponzi recruits Birchum to construct the set for his school play, a reimagining of Shakespeare's Romeo and Juliet titled "Romeo and Romeo" that incorporates themes of gender fluidity and colonialism. Eddie meanwhile attempts to make one of Wendi's property listings go viral by overhauling her social media accounts. Adam Carolla voices himself in a cameo, with Birchum mistaking him for Gilbert Gottfried.
4	"127 Hours or So"	Manuel Morales & Nate Adams	Byron Kavanagh	May 26, 2024
On the way to his yearly camping trip, Birchum becomes stranded and must contend with his own tools working against him in a survival situation. Back at home, a botched home-repair project leaves Wendi and Eddie in need of outside help.
5	"Oh, the Humanity"	Glenn McCoy & Nate Adams	Byron Kavanagh	June 2, 2024
Wendi pressures the family into participating in a charitable house-building project, requiring everyone to give up their electronic devices. At the build site, Karponzi devotes his attention to organizing committees rather than actual construction, and Birchum steps in to do the physical work himself.
6	"The Gym Rope Incident"	Manuel Morales & Nate Adams	Mike Lynch	June 9, 2024
Birchum and Gage covertly put a climbing rope back up in the school gymnasium, sparking a controversy over body image among the staff. Gage attempts to conceal an embarrassing personal secret while contending with Karponzi's JEDI policies. Birchum is brought before the disciplinary tribunal again and argues in favor of personal accountability, but his wood shop ultimately catches fire due to long-neglected maintenance issues, costing him his job.

== Reception ==
Joel Keller in Decider wrote, "SKIP IT. Mr. Birchum has potential to be a decent adult animated series if it gets away from the cliched Karponzi character and Birchum's fight against 'wokeness', whatever that is, and just concentrates on characters amongst his family and coworkers that are already well-developed. We just wish that part of the show was funnier."

On Bubbleblabber, John Schwarz concluded, "Overall, Mr. Birchum embodies the spirit of what made the Birchum character likable on Crank Yankers and when he was a regular feature on KROQ-FM, but plain-jane scripting and an attempt to cater to an audience rather than try to challenge said audience falls flat, and as such, is a subpar effort to the other animated comedies Mr. Birchum attempts to emulate."

Tyler Hummel for The Pamphleteer wrote, "Adam Carolla has a nominal amount of talent and clout left to make things happen. But given that the reaction to the show has been universally negative outside of the fanbase, it shows that Nashville's biggest conservative content creators have a long way to go."
