= 31st Producers Guild of America Awards =

31st Annual Producers Guild Awards
- Date: January 18, 2020
- Location: Hollywood Palladium, Hollywood, California
- Country: United States
- Presented by: Producers Guild of America

Highlights
- Best Producer(s) Motion Picture: 1917 – Sam Mendes, Pippa Harris, Jayne-Ann Tenggren, and Callum McDougall
- Best Producer(s) Animated Feature: Toy Story 4 – Mark Nielsen and Jonas Rivera
- Best Producer(s) Documentary Motion Picture: Apollo 11 – Todd Douglas Miller and Thomas Petersen

The 31st Producers Guild of America Awards (also known as 2020 Producers Guild Awards), honoring the best film and television producers of 2019, were held at the Hollywood Palladium in Hollywood, California on January 18, 2020. The nominations in the documentary category were announced on November 19, 2019, the nominations in the sports, children's and short-form categories were announced on December 19, 2019, and the remaining nominations for film and television were announced on January 7, 2020.

== Winners and nominees ==
=== Film ===
Darryl F. Zanuck Award for Outstanding Producer of Theatrical Motion Pictures
- 1917 – Sam Mendes, Pippa Harris, Jayne-Ann Tenggren, and Callum McDougall
  - Ford v Ferrari – Peter Chernin, Jenno Topping, and James Mangold
  - The Irishman – Jane Rosenthal, Robert De Niro, Emma Tillinger Koskoff, and Martin Scorsese
  - Jojo Rabbit – Carthew Neal and Taika Waititi
  - Joker – Todd Phillips, Bradley Cooper, and Emma Tillinger Koskoff
  - Knives Out – Rian Johnson and Ram Bergman
  - Little Women – Amy Pascal
  - Marriage Story – Noah Baumbach and David Heyman
  - Once Upon a Time in Hollywood – David Heyman, Shannon McIntosh, and Quentin Tarantino
  - Parasite – Kwak Sin-ae and Bong Joon-ho
Outstanding Producer of Animated Theatrical Motion Pictures
- Toy Story 4 – Mark Nielsen and Jonas Rivera
  - Abominable – Suzanne Buirgy
  - Frozen 2 – Peter Del Vecho
  - How to Train Your Dragon: The Hidden World – Brad Lewis and Bonnie Arnold
  - Missing Link – Arianne Sutner and Travis Knight
Outstanding Producer of Documentary Theatrical Motion Pictures
- Apollo 11 – Todd Douglas Miller and Thomas Petersen
  - Advocate – Philippe Bellaïche and Rachel Leah Jones
  - American Factory – Steven Bognar, Julia Reichert, and Jeff Reichert
  - The Cave – Kirstine Barfod and Sigrid Dyekjaer
  - For Sama – Waad Al-Kateab
  - Honeyland – Atanas Georgiev and Ljubomir Stefanov
  - One Child Nation – Christoph Jörg, Julie Goldman, Christopher Clements, Carolyn Hepburn, Nanfu Wang, and Jialing Zhang

=== Television ===
Norman Felton Award for Outstanding Producer of Episodic Television, Drama
- Succession (HBO) – Jesse Armstrong, Adam McKay, Frank Rich, Kevin Messick, Mark Mylod, Jane Tranter, Tony Roche, Scott Ferguson, Jon Brown, Georgia Pritchett, Will Tracy, Jonathan Glatzer, Dara Schnapper, and Gabrielle Mahon
  - Big Little Lies (HBO) – David E. Kelley, Jean-Marc Vallée, Andrea Arnold, Reese Witherspoon, Bruna Papandrea, Nicole Kidman, Per Saari, Gregg Fienberg, Nathan Ross, David Auge, Lauren Neustadter, and Liane Moriarty
  - The Crown (Netflix) – Peter Morgan, Suzanne Mackie, Stephen Daldry, Andy Harries, Benjamin Caron, Matthew Byam-Shaw, Robert Fox, Michael Casey, Andy Stebbing, Martin Harrison, and Oona O'Beirn
  - Game of Thrones (HBO) – David Benioff, D. B. Weiss, Carolyn Strauss, Bernadette Caulfield, Frank Doelger, David Nutter, Miguel Sapochnik, Bryan Cogman, Chris Newman, Greg Spence, Lisa McAtackney, and Duncan Muggoch
  - Watchmen (HBO) – Damon Lindelof, Tom Spezialy, Nicole Kassell, Stephen Williams, Joseph E. Iberti, Ron Schmidt, Lila Byock, Nick Cuse, Christal Henry, Karen Wacker, John Blair, and Carly Wray
Danny Thomas Award for Outstanding Producer of Episodic Television, Comedy
- Fleabag (Amazon) – Phoebe Waller-Bridge, Harry Bradbeer, Lydia Hampson, Harry Williams, Jack Williams, Joe Lewis, and Sarah Hammond
  - Barry (HBO) – Alec Berg, Bill Hader, Aida Rodgers, Elizabeth Sarnoff, Emily Heller, Julie Camino, and Jason Kim
  - The Marvelous Mrs. Maisel (Amazon) – Amy Sherman-Palladino, Daniel Palladino, Dhana Gilbert, Daniel Goldfarb, Kate Fodor, Sono Patel, and Matthew Shapiro
  - Schitt's Creek (Pop TV) – Eugene Levy, Dan Levy, Andrew Barnsley, Fred Levy, David West Read, Ben Feigin, Michael Short, Rupinder Gill, and Colin Brunton
  - Veep (HBO) – David Mandel, Frank Rich, Julia Louis-Dreyfus, Lew Morton, Morgan Sackett, Peter Huyck, Alex Gregory, Jennifer Crittenden, Gabrielle Allan, Billy Kimball, Rachel Axler, Ted Cohen, Ian Maxtone-Graham, Dan O'Keefe, Steve Hely, David Hyman, Georgia Pritchett, Erik Kenward, Dan Mintz, and Doug Smith
David L. Wolper Award for Outstanding Producer of Limited Series Television
- Chernobyl (HBO) – Craig Mazin, Carolyn Strauss, Jane Featherstone, Johan Renck, Chris Fry, and Sanne Wohlenberg
  - Fosse/Verdon (FX) – Thomas Kail, Steven Levenson, Lin-Manuel Miranda, Joel Fields, George Stelzner, Sam Rockwell, Michelle Williams, Tracey Scott Wilson, Charlotte Stoudt, Nicole Fosse, Erica Kay, Kate Sullivan, and Brad Carpenter
  - True Detective (HBO) – Nic Pizzolatto, Scott Stephens, Daniel Sackheim, Peter Feldman, Steve Golin, and Bard Dorros
  - Unbelievable (Netflix) – Susannah Grant, Sarah Timberman, Carl Beverly, Lisa Cholodenko, Ayelet Waldman, Michael Chabon, Katie Couric, Jennifer Schuur, Becky Mode, John Vohlers, Kate DiMento, and Chris Leanza
  - When They See Us (Netflix) – Jeff Skoll, Jonathan King, Jane Rosenthal, Robert De Niro, Berry Welsh, Oprah Winfrey, Ava DuVernay, Amy J. Kaufman, and Robin Swicord
Outstanding Producer of Streamed or Televised Motion Pictures
- Apollo: Missions to the Moon (Nat Geo) – Tom Jennings, David Tillman, Abe Scheuermann, Chris Morcom, and Rob Kirk
  - American Son (Netflix) – Kenny Leon, Kerry Washington, Pilar Savone, and Kristin Bernstein
  - Black Mirror (Episode: "Striking Vipers") (Netflix) – Annabel Jones, Charlie Brooker, and Kate Glover
  - Deadwood: The Movie (HBO) – David Milch, Carolyn Strauss, Gregg Fienberg, Scott Stephens, Daniel Minahan, Ian McShane, Timothy Olyphant, Regina Corrado, Nichole Beattie, and Mark Tobey
  - El Camino: A Breaking Bad Movie (Netflix) – Mark Johnson, Melissa Bernstein, Charles Newirth, Vince Gilligan, Aaron Paul, and Diane Mercer
Outstanding Producer of Non-Fiction Television
- Leaving Neverland (HBO) – Dan Reed
  - 30 for 30 (ESPN) – Libby Geist, Connor Schell, John Dahl, Rob King, Erin Leyden, Gentry Kirby, Deidre Fenton, Marquis Daisy, Jenna Anthony, and Adam Neuhaus
  - 60 Minutes (CBS) – Bill Owens
  - Queer Eye (Netflix) – David Collins, Michael Williams, Rob Eric, Jennifer Lane, Jordana Hochman, Rachelle Mendez, and Mark Bracero
  - Surviving R. Kelly (Lifetime) – Joel Karsberg, dream hampton, Jesse Daniels, Tamra Simmons, Brie Miranda Bryant, Jessica Everleth, Mary Bissell, Maria Pepin, Charlotte Glover, Allison Brandin, and Laura Hoeppner
Outstanding Producer of Game & Competition Television
- RuPaul's Drag Race (VH1) – Fenton Bailey, Randy Barbato, Tom Campbell, Mandy Salangsang, RuPaul Charles, Steven Corfe, Bruce McCoy, Michele Mills, Jacqueline Wilson, Thairin Smothers, John Polly, Michelle Visage, and Jen Passovoy
  - The Amazing Race (ABC) – Jerry Bruckheimer, Bertram van Munster, Jonathan Littman, Elise Doganieri, Mark Vertullo, and Phil Keoghan
  - The Masked Singer (Fox) – Craig Plestis, Izzie Pick Ibarra, Nikki Varhely-Gillingham, and Rosie Seitchik
  - Top Chef (Bravo) – Dan Cutforth, Jane Lipsitz, Doneen Arquines, Casey Kriley, Tara Siener, Justin Rae Barnes, Blake Davis, Patrick Schmedeman, Wade Sheeler, Tom Colicchio, Padma Lakshmi, Elida Carbajal Araiza, Brian Fowler, Caitlin Rademaekers, Steve Lichtenstein, and Emily Van Bergen
  - The Voice (NBC) – John de Mol Jr., Mark Burnett, Audrey Morrissey, Stijn Bakkers, Amanda Zucker, Kyra Thompson, Teddy Valenti, Kyley Tucker, and Carson Daly
Outstanding Producer of Live Entertainment & Talk Television
- Last Week Tonight with John Oliver (HBO) – John Oliver, Tim Carvell, Liz Stanton, Jeremy Tchaban, Chris Werner, Laura Griffin, Kate Mullaney, Matt Passet, Marian Wang, and Charles Wilson
  - The Daily Show with Trevor Noah (Comedy Central) – Trevor Noah, Jen Flanz, Jill Katz, Justin Melkmann, Zhubin Parang, Jocelyn Conn, Max Browning, Eric Davies, Pamela DePace, Ramin Hedayati, David Kibuuka, Elise Terrell, Dave Blog, Adam Chodikoff, Jimmy Donn, Jeff Gussow, Kira Klang Hopf, Allison MacDonald, and Ryan Middleton
  - Dave Chappelle: Sticks & Stones (Netflix) – Dave Chappelle, Stan Lathan, Rikki Hughes, and Sina Sadighi
  - The Late Show with Stephen Colbert (CBS) – Stephen Colbert, Chris Licht, Tom Purcell, Jon Stewart, Barry Julien, Denise Rehrig, Tanya Michnevich Bracco, Paul Dinello, Matt Lappin, Opus Moreschi, Emily Gertler, Michael Brumm, Bjoern Stejskal, Paige Kendig, Jake Plunkett, Aaron Cohen, Sara Vilkomerson, and Adam Wager
  - Saturday Night Live (NBC) – Lorne Michaels, Steve Higgins, Erik Kenward, Lindsay Shookus, Erin Doyle, Tom Broecker, and Ken Aymong
Outstanding Sports Program
- What's My Name: Muhammad Ali (HBO)
  - Hard Knocks: Training Camp with the Oakland Raiders (HBO)
  - Lindsey Vonn: The Final Season (HBO)
  - Real Sports with Bryant Gumbel (HBO)
  - SportsCenter with Scott Van Pelt (ESPN)
Outstanding Children's Program
- Sesame Street (PBS/HBO)
  - Carmen Sandiego (Netflix)
  - The Dark Crystal: Age of Resistance (Netflix)
  - Green Eggs and Ham (Netflix)
  - A Series of Unfortunate Events (Netflix)
Outstanding Short-Form Program
- Comedians in Cars Getting Coffee (Netflix)
  - Billy on the Street (YouTube)
  - Born This Way (A&E)
  - Creating Saturday Night Live (YouTube)
  - Under a Rock with Tig Notaro (YouTube)

=== PGA Innovation Award ===
PGA Innovation Award
- Vader Immortal: A Star Wars VR Series – Episode I
  - 20,000 Leagues Under the Sea: An Interactive Adventure
  - Artificial
  - Black Mirror: Bandersnatch
  - Bonfire
  - Cosmos Within Us
  - Eleven Eleven
  - First Man VR
  - How to Train Your Dragon: Fly with Toothless VR
  - How to Train Your Dragon: The Hidden World Virtual Tour
  - Interactive Play at Sesame Street Land, SeaWorld, Orlando
  - Mesmerica
  - Tree VR
  - You vs. Wild

=== Milestone Award ===
- Ted Sarandos

=== Stanley Kramer Award ===
- Bombshell

=== Visionary Award ===
- Octavia Spencer

=== David O. Selznick Achievement Award in Theatrical Motion Pictures ===
- Brad Pitt, Dede Gardner, and Jeremy Kleiner

=== Norman Lear Achievement Award in Television ===
- Marta Kauffman
