= Brightest Young Things =

American online magazine

- Website type: Online magazine
- Available in: English
- Website: brightestyoungthings.com
- Launched: 2007; 19 years ago
- Current status: Inactive

Brightest Young Things, or BYT Media Inc., was an online magazine and event production and marketing agency based in Washington, D.C., and New York City. Founded in 2009 by Svetlana Legetic, a former Architecture Designer from Serbia, Brightest Young Things publishes original articles, interviews, guides and calendars pertaining to “food”, “style”, “music”, “art”, “theatre”, “film”, “gays”, and “weird” social events and trends in Washington, D.C., and, as of August 2012, New York City. The site regularly published up to 30 posts a day and published about 100 original articles a week, and was known for its cultural knowledge about Washington, D.C.'s trending restaurants, nightlife, and events, targeting young, 20-something “hipster” crowds in both Washington, D.C., and New York City.

Brightest Young Things also put on multiple yearly events in both cities, such as the Bentzen Ball Comedy Festival in Washington, D.C., often collectively selling up to 30,000 tickets for these events. Events in Washington, D.C., included Brightest Young Things collaborations with National Geographic, Virgin Mobile, and The Kennedy Center.

The website shuttered in January 2021.

== Origins ==
Brightest Young Things began as Legetic's successful Myspace page in 2006, chronicling Washington, D.C., nightlife events. Legetic claims that Brightest Young Things began to take shape when she met Cale Charney (BYT's current event producer), web designer Jason Bond Pratt and graphic designer Erik Loften, who helped her buy a URL and begin building the website. What started out as a part-time job for Legetic and close friends and aimed to create a single stop for information about DC social events has since become, according to Legetic, a "self-sustained media property" with at least 6 full-time employees, 60 contributors, and numerous interns. In 2012, The New York Times called Brightest Young Things a "party-production juggernaut," and Legetic was named No. 42 on GQ Magazine's 50 most powerful people in Washington, D.C.

On March 25, 2013, managing editor Logan Donaldson was accused of plagiarizing a number of blurbs on BYT's “spring and summer music guide” from sources such as Rolling Stone, Telegraph, and Wikipedia. Two days later the site announced Donaldson's resignation and temporarily removed all archived content before March 25, 2013, for an "internal audit" that revealed other plagiarized content from Donaldson's time at Brightest Young Things.
