= Knock Knock, It's Tig Notaro =

- Poster
- Directed by: Michael LaHaie; Christopher Wilcha
- Written by: Tig Notaro
- Starring: Tig Notaro; Jon Dore
- Cinematography: Adam Beckman
- Edited by: Joe Beshenkovsky
- Music by: Adam Samuel Goldman
- Production company: Left/Right Productions
- Distributed by: Showtime Networks
- Release dates: March 16, 2015 (South by Southwest); April 17, 2015 (Showtime)
- Running time: 76 minutes
- Country: United States
- Language: English

Knock Knock, It's Tig Notaro is a 2015 stand-up comedy tour documentary film starring Tig Notaro and Jon Dore. The film premiered on March 16, 2015 at the South by Southwest Film Festival and aired on Showtime on April 17, 2015.

== Synopsis ==
Comedian Tig Notaro travels across the country in order to put on a series of performances in the homes, back yards, barns, and basements of her most loyal fans.

== Cast ==
- Tig Notaro - Herself (headlining comedian)
- Jon Dore - Himself (opening comedian)
- Nick Kroll - Himself (comedian friend)
- Steve Agee - Himself (early touring comedian)
- Martha Kelly Herself (early touring comedian)
- Doug Lehmann - Himself (Mystery Twins opening band)
- Stephanie Brush - Herself (Mystery Twins opening band)
- Jeff Garlin - Himself (closing credits screening)
- Seth Meyers - Himself (closing credits screening)

== Production ==
On July 2, 2013 Showtime's YouTube channel posted a video of Tig on the beach in Seal Beach, California asking fans to propose different shows by going to www.tigroadtrip.com and asking her to perform on rooftops, backyards, basements, living rooms, garages or barns. In an interview with Dan Casey at Nerdist, Notaro said, "I’ve been doing this for the past decade, and it was just kind of like this idea that my friend Martha and I had to bypass the – yeah, I guess the grind of the comedy club scene, and just see if we could freshen things up a bit, and make things a little awkward."

== Filming ==
The documentary was filmed starting in early August 2013. The stops of the tour that were finally included in the film are:

- Topanga Canyon, California (geodome)
- Chicago (car, hotel, comedy club)
- Cordry Sweetwater Lakes, Indiana (lake house)
- East Nashville, Tennessee (East Room/abandoned church)
- Clarksdale, Mississippi (sharecropper cabin)
- Pluto, Mississippi (cornfield)
- Pass Christian, Mississippi (house party, also Tig's hometown)
