= Live (Tig Notaro album) =

- Cover photo by Robyn Von Swank

Live album by Tig Notaro
- Released: October 5, 2012; July 16, 2013 (Deluxe Edition)
- Recorded: August 3, 2012; December 5, 2012 (Deluxe Edition)
- Venue: Largo; Avalon Hollywood (Deluxe Edition)
- Genre: Comedy; Spoken Word (Deluxe Edition)
- Length: 31:16; 47:12 (Deluxe Edition)
- Label: Pig Newton; Secretly Canadian (Deluxe Edition)

Tig Notaro chronology
Good One (2011)	Live (2012)	Boyish Girl Interrupted (2016)

Live (pronounced "liv") is the second live album by American comedian Tig Notaro. It is a deeply personal set performed just four days after Notaro was diagnosed with stage two breast cancer. The album was first released as a download on Louis C.K.'s website in 2012. It was the first release that C.K. featured on his website by a comedian other than himself, though it is no longer available on the website. The audio of the album was originally recorded at Notaro's regular monthly stand-up show Tig Has Friends at Largo for an episode of the radio show This American Life. Notaro did not want to put out the album at first, but C.K. convinced her to release it.

== Deluxe edition ==
Secretly Canadian released the physical version of the album the next year on double-CD, download and a limited picture-disc vinyl as a Deluxe Edition. The Deluxe Edition bonus audio was originally recorded for The Moth radio show.

== Track listing ==
Disc 1

No.	Title	Length
1.	"Hello, I Have Cancer"	3:44
2.	"You're Gonna Get Cancer!"	2:26
3.	"Serious Inquiries Only"	2:01
4.	"Funny Cancer Greeting Cards"	1:50
5.	"Tit for Tat"	3:12
6.	"No Questionnaires to Dead People"	3:03
7.	"The C-Diff Diet"	2:20
8.	"Triscuits"	2:44
9.	"God is Crazy"	1:31
10.	"Tapped Out"	3:25
11.	"Chilean Miner"	2:24
12.	"The Bee Joke"	2:32

Deluxe Edition - Disc 2

No.	Title	Length
1.	"Live at The Moth"	15:56

== Personnel ==
- Album Cover Design – Daniel Murphy
- Design Concept, Design (Co-design) – Tig Notaro
- Photography By – Robyn Von Swank
- Recorded By – Alec Dixon

== Awards ==
The album was nominated in 2014 for the Grammy Award for Best Comedy Album at the 56th Annual Grammy Awards, which Tig hosted the Pre-Telecast Ceremony streamed online. Notaro lost to Kathy Griffin's Calm Down Gurrl.

== Charts ==
The album peaked at No. 1 on Billboard's Top Comedy Albums chart.
