= Largo (nightclub) =

Nightclub in Los Angeles, California

Coordinates: 34.077849°N 118.376319°W

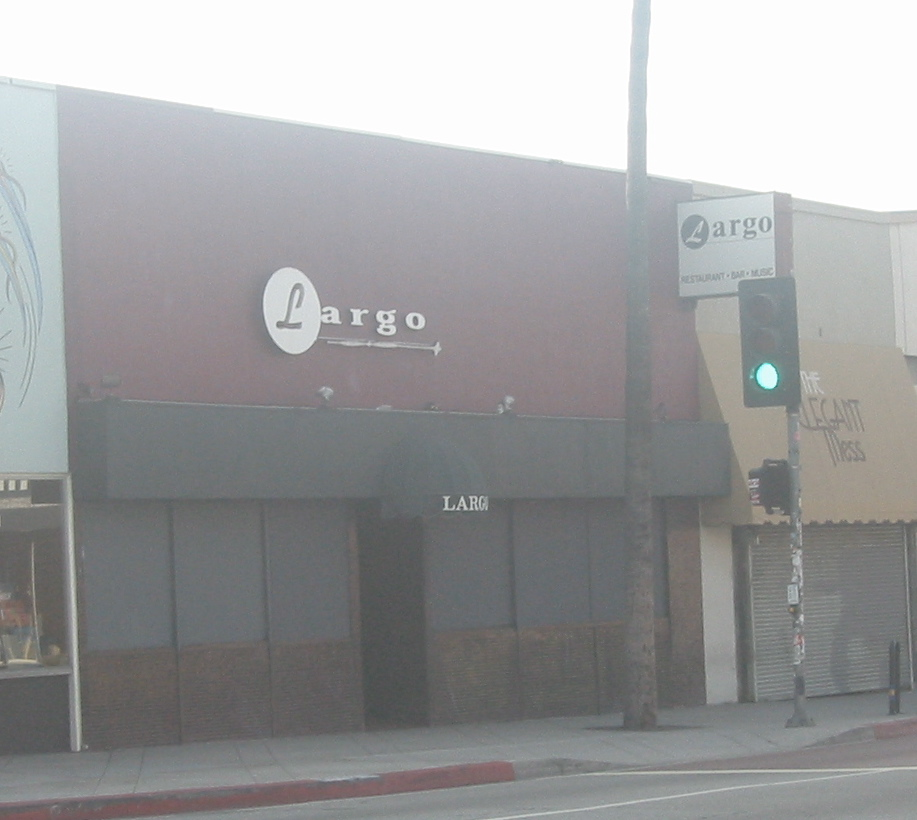
Largo nightclub exterior (previous location)

Largo, also called Café Largo, Largo, darling!, or Club Largo, is a nightclub and cabaret in Los Angeles, California. Largo is known for its musical and comedy shows and for the Friday night residency of singer-songwriter Jon Brion.

== History ==
Prior to 1969, the Roxy Theatre at 9009 Sunset Strip, was the Largo, an upscale burlesque club.

The 1989 Café Largo was founded by Jean-Pierre Boccara, a nightclub entrepreneur, in 1989. Café Largo featured music (including performances by Peter Himmelman, Colin Hay, Victoria Williams, Suzanne Vega, Syd Straw, The Love Jones, Julie Christensen, Hugo Largo, Grant Lee Buffalo, Fiona Apple), cabaret (including performances by Philip Littell, Stephanie Vlahos, Lypsinka, Barry Yourgrau), vaudeville (Les Stevens), comedy (Nora Dunn, Beth Lapides), and spoken word (Tommy Cody, Eve Brandstein, Michael Lally).

The LA Weekly named Café Largo "LA's Best Supper Club" in 1990. The New York Times ran a substantive review "A Place for Poetry in Land of Pictures" on July 12, 1989. Several reviews were published in Newsweek, LA Style, LA Times, Los Angeles, Buzz, Exposure, Movieline, The Edge, Details, Village View, Vogue, Interview, Playboy, and US Magazine. In March 1992, Boccara sold the club to Mark Flanagan and his wife Aimee Cain (international model and of Star Search fame). Flanagan shortened the name to Largo, and his name to simply "Flanagan." Fergus O'Flynn and Joanne McKenna, along with Flanagan, were equal shareholders. Boccara went on to open LunaPark on Robertson Blvd. in West Hollywood and operated it from Halloween 1993 to Halloween 2000.

Flanagan began operating Largo in April 1992. (In the 1960s, the Largo, owned by Chuck Landis, was a strip club on Sunset Blvd.) In 1996, Flanagan re-established Largo as an intimate cabaret with live music, mainly in the piano bar tradition. Largo's original location on Fairfax Avenue had 100 seats, with a maximum full capacity of 130, and regularly sold out, with frequent sightings of celebrity musicians and actors in the audience. The club had a strict no talking or cellphone use policy during performances, but allowed audience members to live-blog on their laptops.

Flanagan persuaded Jon Brion to take a regular Friday-night residence at Largo. Brion's contacts brought other singer-songwriters to perform at the club, including Aimee Mann, Michael Penn, Steve Brandano, Fiona Apple (who included a song expressing her love for the club, "Largo," as a bonus digital track on her fourth album), and Elliott Smith. Over the years, the list of semi-regular performers at the club has included Neil Finn, E of the Eels, Robyn Hitchcock, John Doe, Ben Folds, Grant-Lee Phillips, Rickie Lee Jones, Rufus Wainwright, Jakob Dylan, Teddy Thompson, t.A.T.u., Brad Mehldau, and Colin Hay.

== Performances ==
The typical Largo show involves a mix of music and stand-up comedy. Mann and Penn developed a road show called Acoustic Vaudeville on the Largo format, which they have taken to Chicago and New York. Seinfeld co-creator Larry David is seen performing stand-up comedy at Largo in his 1999 HBO special Larry David: Curb Your Enthusiasm. Brion names the genre celebrated by Largo as "unpopular pop", and underlines the emphasis on lyrics with "We're all song sluts here." Many of the individuals who frequented Largo have had the infamous history of their labels refusing to release their albums. Though generally tied together by this common aesthetic, performers come from many traditions, including country, rock, and cabaret.

Brad Mehldau released a jazz album produced by Jon Brion entitled Largo. Toad the Wet Sprocket singer/songwriter Glen Phillips performs regularly and has recorded a live album Live at Largo at the club. Andy Prieboy developed his musical White Trash Wins Lotto at the club. The band Tenacious D largely got their start at Largo, which in turn launched the career of actor/comedian Jack Black. Dan Finnerty started The Dan Band at Largo, doing monthly shows there before his stints in Old School and Starsky & Hutch. The band Wild Colonials largely got their start at Largo with a successful Tuesday night residency that lasted nine months during 1992 and 1993. In 1993, at the height of the Los Angeles spoken word scene of that decade, Largo hosted several events featuring L.A. writers Viggo Mortensen, Scott Wannberg, Ellyn Maybe, S.A. Griffin, Tequila Mockingbird, and Linda Ravenswood. A five-track CD of Elliott Smith playing solo at Largo was released in October 2007, accompanying photographer Autumn de Wilde's book, Elliott Smith.

In 2012, comedian Tig Notaro performed a set after just being diagnosed with cancer. She did not intend to release the audio at first, but later, the album Live was nominated for the Grammy Award for Best Comedy Album at the 56th Annual Grammy Awards.

Sarah Silverman taped her 2013 HBO stand-up special, We Are Miracles at the Largo, before an audience of 39.

In 2020, during the COVID-19 pandemic and the associated lockdown, US comedian Conan O'Brien relocated Conan, his TBS late-night talk show, to the Largo, following several months broadcasting from his home.

== Relocation ==
On June 2, 2008, Flanagan closed the club and moved to the Coronet Theatre on La Cienega Boulevard, renaming it Largo at the Coronet. Jon Brion continues his monthly residency, performing on Friday, usually near the end of each month. He has also begun to incorporate video samples of musicians into his musical performances.
