= Scott Wannberg =

American writer

Scott David Wannberg (February 20, 1953 – August 19, 2011) was an American poet. His work was considered one of the anchors in the Los Angeles poetry scene. As a poet he wrote primarily in what would be considered stream of consciousness, rarely editing any of his work until late in life. His work was informed by music, film and beat poetry. He worked as a clerk at Vroman's Bookstore on the Third Street Promenade, and at Dutton's Brentwood. Wannberg was a founding member of the traveling poet troupe known as the Carma Bums. His works include Nomads of Oblivion, Strange Movie Full of Death, and Tomorrow Is Another Song. He died of a heart attack on August 19, 2011, at the age of 58.

== Early life ==
Scott Wannberg was born in Santa Monica, CA on February 20, 1953. He grew up near Venice Beach, and, in high school, was the film critic for the Venice High School newspaper. He received his master's degree in creative writing from San Francisco State University in 1977. Some of the more important influences on his work as a poet were Walt Whitman, Charles Bukowski, Philip Levine, the Beat Generation writers, and most profoundly, William Carlos Williams, as Scott was deeply committed to his own search for what might be considered the "American" idiom in language and letters.

== Works ==
Over the course of his life, and posthumously, Wannberg has been published extensively in numerous literary journals. His first book of poetry, Mr. Mumps was published by Ouija Madness Press (1982), followed by The Electric Yes Indeed! published by Shelf Life Press (1988). Other titles include Strange Movie Full of Death (2009), Tomorrow is Another Song (2011) and The Official Language of Yes (2015), all published by Viggo Mortensen’s Perceval Press. Wannberg was also a member of the poetry troupe the Carma Bums, a group of traveling poets that performed primarily throughout the American Southwest and Canada until August 2009.

Actor Ed Harris stated "His poetry can be political, polemical, personal, provocative, and it shies away from cheap alliteration...his work is contemporary and timeless, brave and honest, and fun as hell to read."

=== Bibliography ===
- Mr.Mumps. Ouija Madness, 1982.
- The Electric Yes Indeed! 1989. ISBN 0-962-33690-4
- Twisted Cadillac: A spoken word odyssey. Sacred Beverage Press, 1996. ISBN 978-0965204804 with The Carma Bums.
- Harvey Keitel, Harvey Keitel, Harvey Keitel. 2005. ISBN 1-930-93530-7
- Tomorrow is Another Song. Perceval Press, 2011. ISBN 0-981-97477-5
- Strange Movie Full of Death. Perceval Press, 2012. ISBN 0-981-97473-2
- The Official Language of Yes. Perceval Press, 2015. ISBN 0-989-56169-0
- Scott Wannberg: The Lummox Years - 1996 to 2006. Perceval Press, 2015. ISBN 1-929-87854-0
- Harvey Korman, Harvey Korman, Harvey Korman. Spartan Press, 2017. ISBN 1-946-64201-0 with John Dorsey & S.A. Griffin.

== Death ==
Scott Wannberg died of a heart attack at his home in Florence, Oregon on August 19, 2011.
