= Tig Notaro =

American podcaster and comedian

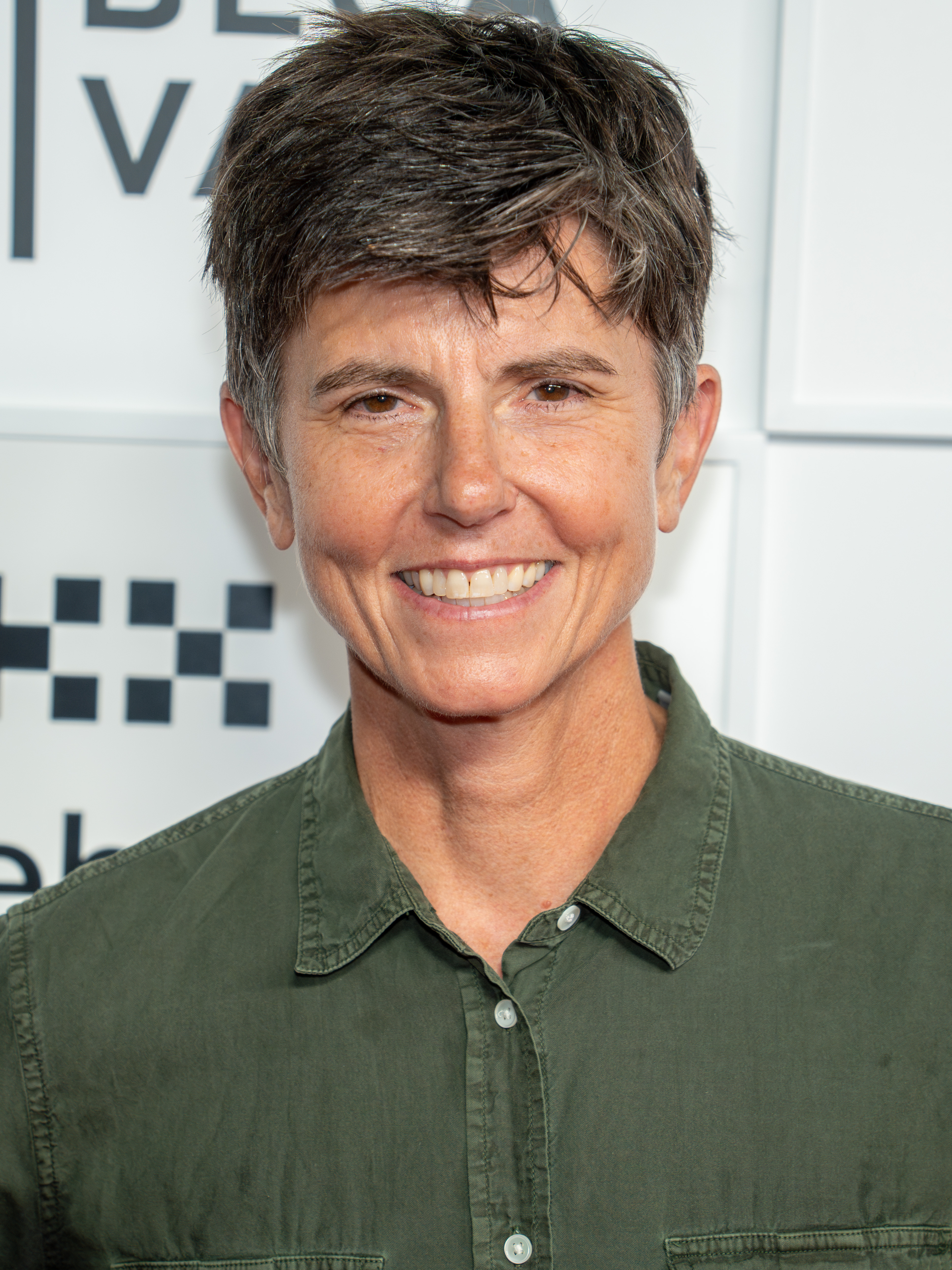
- Notaro at the 2025 Tribeca Festival
- Born: Mathilde O'Callaghan Notaro; March 24, 1971 (age 55); Jackson, Mississippi, U.S.
- Spouse: Stephanie Allynne (m. 2015)
- Children: 2

Comedy career
- Years active: 2001–present
- Medium: Stand-up, television, film, podcast
- Genres: Observational comedy, black comedy, deadpan, surreal humor, cringe comedy
- Website: tignation.com

Mathilde O'Callaghan "Tig" Notaro (born March 24, 1971) is an American stand-up comedian, director, producer, screenwriter, and actress known for her deadpan comedy. She is a two-time nominee for the Grammy Award for Best Comedy Album, and received a Primetime Emmy Award nomination for her 2015 special Boyish Girl Interrupted. In 2026, she received a nomination for an Academy Award for her work as a producer on the documentary film Come See Me in the Good Light. As an actress, she is known for her leading role in One Mississippi (2015–2017), a series she created with Diablo Cody, and her supporting roles as Amanda Robinson in The Morning Show (2023–2025), and as Jett Reno in Star Trek: Discovery (2019–2024) and Star Trek: Starfleet Academy (2026–present). She also hosted her own talk show, Under a Rock with Tig Notaro in 2019.

== Early life ==
Notaro was born in Jackson, Mississippi, the daughter of Mathilde "Susie" O'Callaghan and Pat Notaro. Her mother was born in New Orleans. Notaro lived in Pass Christian, Mississippi until kindergarten. Later, her family relocated to Spring, Texas (a suburb of Houston). She has a brother, Renaud, who is a year older and works as a radio talk show host. "Tig" is a childhood nickname (for Mathilde) given to her by her brother when she was two years old. The family was Catholic.

Notaro's maternal great-great-grandfather was John Fitzpatrick, who was the mayor of New Orleans from 1892 to 1896. While taking part in season 5 of Finding Your Roots with Henry Louis Gates, Jr., Notaro learned she is also a distant cousin of Gloria Steinem.

In an interview with Mother Jones magazine, Notaro said she disliked being a student. She failed three grades, eventually dropping out of high school. In 1990, while living in Texas, she received her General Equivalency Diploma (GED).

Notaro plays the guitar and drums; she played in various bands when she was younger.

== Career ==
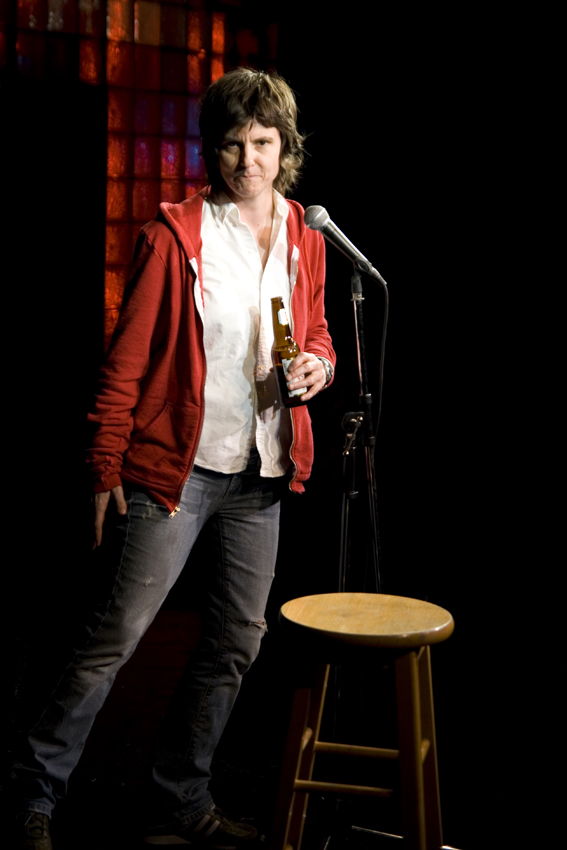
Notaro in 2010

An avid musician and music enthusiast, Notaro moved to Denver, Colorado, where she entered the music industry. She became a band manager, working under the name Tignation Promotions in the mid-'90s. Her work promoting bands took her to Los Angeles, where she tried stand-up for the first time in the late '90s. She has since been featured on Comedy Central Presents and on The Sarah Silverman Program as a lesbian police officer. She collaborates frequently with her writing partner Kyle Dunnigan. She co-hosted the podcast Professor Blastoff with Dunnigan and David Huntsberger from May 2011 until July 2015.

In 2011, Notaro released her debut stand-up album, Good One. Her 2012 album, Live, is a recording of a stand-up set performed shortly after she was diagnosed with breast cancer. In 2012, she appeared on Conan, and in May of that year on the live episode of This American Life, which was broadcast to theaters nationwide and on radio in edited form. She performed a monologue about having encountered Taylor Dayne on multiple occasions, greeting her each time with, "Excuse me, I'm sorry to bother you, but I just have to tell you - I love your voice." After her monologue, Dayne made a surprise appearance, serenading Notaro with the song "I'll Always Love You". She worked on fellow comedian Amy Schumer's Comedy Central series Inside Amy Schumer. In June 2012, Notaro did a Kickstarter-funded series called Clown Service, which she wrote and starred in.

Notaro wrote a memoir for HarperCollins Imprint Ecco titled I'm Just a Person. In March 2015, Showtime debuted a documentary at South by Southwest about her life and her post-cancer stand-up tour, Knock Knock, It's Tig Notaro. In July 2015, Netflix released a film, Tig, chronicling her attempts to conceive with her fiancée, Stephanie Allynne. Singer Sharon Van Etten wrote a song for the credit sequence of the film titled "Words" as an homage to Notaro.

In November 2015, Notaro co-wrote, produced, and starred in a semi-autobiographical TV pilot for Amazon Video called One Mississippi. It received a six-episode series order from Amazon a month later. It follows Notaro's character as she returns to her hometown of Bay Saint Louis, Mississippi after her mother's unexpected death.

Her first stand-up one-hour special was released by HBO in 2015, titled Tig Notaro: Boyish Girl Interrupted. In 2016, it was released as her third album under her own label, Bentzen Ball Records, which also released Aparna Nancherla's Just Putting It Out There.

In 2017, she was cast in Star Trek: Discovery as Chief Engineer Jett Reno of the U.S.S. Hiawatha. Originally a guest role in the second and third seasons, her character was promoted to a series role. She will continue to play Reno as a regular in the upcoming series Starfleet Academy.

Netflix released Notaro's second one-hour special, Happy to Be Here, on May 22, 2018. She was digitally inserted in post-production in Zack Snyder's Army of the Dead, replacing Chris D'Elia, who was accused of sexual misconduct.

=== Comedic style ===
On her approach to comedy (and whether she considers herself a dark comic), Notaro says: "I'm always going to do whatever I think is funniest. If something's dark, I'll do it. If it's a sock puppet... There's no preconceived idea of who I think I might be now." Notaro said that since her cancer diagnosis, she has shifted not to darker comedy but rather to personal comedy. Previously her comedic style was more general, detached, and observational, but now she frequently reflects on her childhood and life.

In the autumn of 2016, she appeared in a video as an onstage "stand-in" during the Nostalgic for the Present concert tour of Australian singer Sia for the song "Diamonds."

== Personal life ==
Notaro met her wife Stephanie Allynne on the set of the film In a World... They married in 2015, officiated by an Old Catholic deacon (Notaro's cousin). They welcomed twin sons in 2016, conceived via a surrogate using Allynne's eggs.

=== Cancer ===
Notaro was diagnosed with cancer in both breasts on July 30, 2012. On August 3, she addressed her cancer diagnosis and other personal difficulties during a live stage show at Largo in Los Angeles. The set has been described as "instantly legendary"; many comedians have praised her work.

The next day, comedian Louis C.K. called Notaro, telling her he wanted to release the audio of the show. She was uncomfortable with the idea at first, but decided the material could help people, so she agreed. C.K. made audio of the performance available that October for download on his site under the title Live. Notaro later released the audio (with booklet) on iTunes; it sold more copies than rock band Kiss's album Monster, which debuted the same week, something Notaro said she never dreamed could happen. She was a Kiss fan in her youth.

Notaro subsequently had a double mastectomy with no reconstructive surgery; she opted out of chemotherapy but decided instead to continue treatment with hormone blocking. In November 2014, as part of the New York Comedy Festival, she did a set at Town Hall in New York City wherein she performed part of the set topless. The New York Times described it: "She showed the audience her scars and then, through the force of her showmanship, made you forget that they were there. It was a powerful, even inspiring, statement about survival and recovery, and yet, it had the larky feel of a dare." After a November 2014 show in Philadelphia, Notaro was hospitalized and required surgery for a cyst.

In 2017, Notaro adopted a vegan diet, which she credited for eliminating the chronic pain she had experienced in the years following her cancer diagnosis. She later earned a certification in plant-based nutrition.

== Discography ==
=== Albums ===
- 2011: Good One (Secretly Canadian) – CD+DVD, LP, download, streaming
- 2012: Live (Pig Newton) – download, streaming
- 2013: Live: Deluxe Edition (Secretly Canadian) – 2xCD, picture disc LP, LP, download, streaming
- 2016: Boyish Girl Interrupted (Secretly Canadian) – CD, LP, download, streaming
- 2018: Happy to Be Here (Netflix) – LP, streaming
- 2022: Drawn (Comedy Dynamics) - CD, LP, download, streaming
- 2024: Hello Again (Secretly Canadian) – CD, LP, download, streaming

=== Specials ===
- 2004: Comedy Central Presents – download, streaming
- 2015: Boyish Girl Interrupted (HBO) – download, streaming
- 2018: Happy to Be Here (Netflix) – download, streaming
- 2021: Drawn (HBO Max) – download, streaming
- 2024: Hello Again (Amazon Prime Video) – download, streaming

=== Videos ===
- 2008: Have Tig at Your Party – also director, writer, executive producer (bonus DVD of Good One: Deluxe Edition)
- 2013: Professor Blastoff – 100th Episode! – Earwolf – Video Podcast Network (YouTube)
- 2014: The Moth – "R2, Where Are You" (YouTube) – also writer (the audio of the video is the bonus content of her album Live: Deluxe Edition)

=== Singles ===
- 2016: "Mississippi Relatives" – download, streaming
- 2017: 7-Inches for Planned Parenthood – "My Ideal Exchange with a Stranger" (Live at Largo) (7-Inches For™, LLC) – 7" pink vinyl, download
- 2020: "Little Titties" – download, streaming

=== Audiobook ===
- 2016: I'm Just a Person (Harper Audio) – CD ISBN 978-1504734523, download ASIN B01EGHBEDE

=== Compilations ===
- 2010: Live Nude Comedy, Vol. 1 (Salient Music) – download (tracks 11 and 12)
- 2010: Comedy Death-Ray Xmas CD 2010 (Aspecialthing Records) – CD (song: We Are The World 25.75)

== Filmography ==
Key
†	Denotes works that have not yet been released

=== Film ===
Year	Title	Role	Notes
2009	The Tig Series		Short; also director, writer, executive producer
2010	Lez Chat	Announcer	Short; also director, writer
2010	We Are the World 25.75	Herself	Short
2010	Christmas Lady Marmalade	Herself	Short
2011	Crying in Public	Coffee Shop Crier	Short
2012	Craigslist Joe	Herself	Documentary
2013	In a World...	Cher	
2014	Walk of Shame	Impound Woman	
2014	Catch Hell	Careen	
2014	Ashes	Dr. Lori	
2014	Clown Service	Tig	Short; also director, co-writer, executive producer
2015	Rubberhead	Girl 4	Segment: "Lisa"
2015	Knock Knock, It's Tig Notaro	Herself	Documentary; also writer, executive producer
2015	Tig	Herself	Documentary; also executive producer
2016	The Fun Company	Jade	Short
2016	Punching Henry	Jillian	
2018	Dog Days	Danielle	
2018	Instant Family	Sharon	
2019	Lucy in the Sky	Kate Mounier	
2021	Music	Radgicals Host	
2021	Together Together	Madeline	
2021	Army of the Dead	Marianne Peters	
2022	Am I OK?	Sheila	Also director and producer
2022	Beavis and Butt-Head Do the Universe	Professor	Voice
2023	Your Place or Mine	Alicia	
2023	We Have a Ghost	Dr. Leslie Monroe	
2023	Glitter & Doom	Fiasco	
2025	Come See Me in the Good Light	—N/a	Producer
2025	Zootopia 2	Big Tig	Voice
2027	The Comeback King †	TBA	Filming
2027	Beach Read †	TBA	Filming

=== Television ===
Year	Title	Role	Notes
2004	Movies at Our House	Herself	3 episodes
2004	Comedy Central Presents	Herself	Episode: "Tig"
2006	Dog Bites Man	Leigh Roy	Episode: "Assignment: Undercover Homosexual"
2007–2010	The Sarah Silverman Program	Tig	9 episodes
2008	Held Up	Homeless Translator	Television film
2008	Biography	Herself	Episode: "Sarah Silverman"
2009	In the Motherhood	Rhoda	4 episodes
2009	Back on Topps	Mom	Episode: "Rejuvenated"
2010	MTV Movie Awards		Writer
2010	Community	Bartender	Episode: "Mixology Certification"
2011	The Life & Times of Tim	Receptionist	Voice, episode: "The Model from Newark/Tim's Hair Looks Amazing"
2012	The Office	Single Mom	Episode: "Test the Store"
2012	This American Life Live!: Invisible Made Visible	Herself	Television film
2012	Stand Down: True Tales from Stand-Up Comedy	Herself	Episode: "Tig Notaro Creates an Emergency"
2012	Susan 313	Beth Ann	NBC pilot
2013, 2021	Bob's Burgers	Jody / Officer Large (voice)	2 episodes
2013	Inside Amy Schumer	Tig	2 episodes; also writer
2013	Why We Laugh: Funny Women	Herself	TV documentary
2013–2014	Comedy Bang! Bang!	Police Officer	2 episodes
2014	56th Grammy Awards Pre-Telecast Ceremony	Herself (host)	TV special
2014	Suburgatory	Rebecca Dunn	Episode: "Dalia Nicole Smith"
2014	Maron	Sydney	Episode: "Mouth Cancer Gig"
2014	Garfunkel and Oates	Pumpernickel Place Producer	Episode: "Rule 34"
2014–2019	Transparent	Barb	6 episodes
2014–2017	Clarence	Sue / Annie	Voice, 5 episodes
2015	Sundance Film Festival Closing Night Awards Ceremony	Herself (host)	TV special
2015	Tig Notaro: Boyish Girl Interrupted	Herself	Stand-up special; also director, writer, executive producer
2015	No, You Shut Up!	Herself	Episode: "Jiggle the Handle"
2015	Adventure Time	Purple Comet	Voice, episode: "The Comet"
2015–2017	One Mississippi	Tig Bavaro	12 episodes; also creator, writer, director, and executive producer
2016	Lady Dynamite	Herself	Episode: "Loaf Coach"
2016	The Jim Gaffigan Show	Gomez	Episode: "Ugly"
2016–2026	The Late Show with Stephen Colbert	Herself	12 episodes, including the series finale
2017	Hollywood Horror Stories	Herself	Episode: "Tig Notaro"
2017	The Gorburger Show	Herself	Episode: "Gorbabies"
2018	Tig Notaro: Happy to Be Here	Herself	Stand-up special; also director, writer, executive producer
2018	2 Dope Queens		Series director
2018	Fresh Off the Boat	Ms. Doris	2 episodes
2018	New Girl	Bar Lady	Episode: "Where the Road Goes"
2019–2024	Star Trek: Discovery	Denise "Jett" Reno	19 episodes
2019	Tuca & Bertie	Yeast Week MC & Dr. Sherman	Voice, episode: "Yeast Week"
2019	Under a Rock with Tig Notaro	Herself (host)	12 episodes
2020–2021	The Fungies!	Commander Lazer	Voice, 2 episodes
2021	Tig Notaro: Drawn	Herself	Animated stand-up special; also writer, executive producer
2022	StoryBots: Answer Time		Voice, episode: "Lasers"
2023–2025	Star Wars: Young Jedi Adventures	Ace Kallisto	Voice, 4 episodes
2023–2025	The Morning Show	Amanda Robinson	8 episodes Nominated – Screen Actors Guild Award for Outstanding Performance by an Ensemble in a Drama Series
2024	After Midnight	Herself	Contestant; Episode 22
2024	Tig Notaro: Hello Again	Herself	Stand-up special; also writer, executive producer
2024–2025	The Sex Lives of College Girls	Professor Friedman	5 episodes
2026	Star Trek: Starfleet Academy	Denise "Jett" Reno	7 episodes
2026	American Horror Story: 13	Ricochet	Episode: "1:13 AM"

== Audio broadcasts ==
=== Radio ===
- October 8, 2012: NPR Fresh Air
- December 7, 2012: PRI Science Friday
- 2012–2016: This American Life Episodes 464, 476, 518, 558 and 577
- April 17, 2013: The Moth - "R2 Where Are You" Recorded December 5, 2012
- July 19, 2013: NPR Wait Wait... Don't Tell Me! "Not My Job"
- July 18, 2015: NPR All Things Considered
- June 15, 2016: NPR All Things Considered

=== Podcasts ===
==== Hosted ====
- 2011–2015: Professor Blastoff w/ Kyle Dunnigan and David Huntsberger (217 episodes)
- 2020–2024: Don't Ask Tig
- 2020–2023: Tig and Cheryl: True Story – cohosted with Cheryl Hines
- 2023–present: Handsome – cohosted with Fortune Feimster and Mae Martin

==== Guest ====
- 2008–2011: The Sound of Young America 2011 Interview with Dave Holmes, Best Comedy of 2009, 2008 Stand-up at Bumbershoot
- 2009–2017: Comedy Bang! Bang! (12 episodes)
- 2010–2011: WTF with Marc Maron Episodes 81 and 105
- 2011: The Long Shot Season 1, Episode 14
- 2011, 2017: Jordan, Jesse, Go! Episode 175 and 501
- 2012–2013: The JV Club Episodes 32 and 49
- 2013: Making It Episode 67
- 2013: You Made It Weird with Pete Holmes Episode 177
- 2013: The Nerdist Podcast Episode 381
- 2014, 2017: Bullseye with Jesse Thorn 2017, 2014
- 2017: 2 Dope Queens Episodes 26 & 45
- 2017: The Ezra Klein Show
- 2017: Movie Crush Episode 2
- 2017: Good One: A Podcast About Jokes
- 2017: Out Here In America Episode 2 and Bonus Episode
- 2019: Conan O'Brien Needs a Friend Episode 23

== Books ==
- I'm Just a Person. Ecco Press. 2016. ISBN 978-0062266637. (Humor/memoir)

== Awards and nominations ==
Year	Award show	Category	Nominated work	Result	References
2014	Grammy Awards	Best Comedy Album	Live	Nominated	
2016	Primetime Emmy Awards	Outstanding Writing for a Variety Special	Boyish Girl interrupted	Nominated	
2017	Grammy Awards	Best Comedy Album	Boyish Girl interrupted	Nominated	
2023	Screen Actors Guild Awards	Outstanding Performance by an Ensemble in a Drama Series	The Morning Show	Nominated	
2025	Boulder International Film Festival	Peoples Choice Award - Feature Length Film	Come See Me in the Good Light	Won	
2025	Boulder International Film Festival	Best Feature Documentary	Come See Me in the Good Light	Won	
2026	Sundance Film Festival	Festival Favorite Award	Come See Me in the Good Light	Won	
2026	Academy Awards	Best Documentary Feature Film	Come See Me in the Good Light	Nominated	
