= One Mississippi (TV series) =

Television series

- Genre: Tragicomedy
- Created by: Tig Notaro; Diablo Cody
- Starring: Tig Notaro; Noah Harpster; John Rothman
- Opening theme: "Jambalaya (On the Bayou)" by The Plainsmen
- Composer: Marcelo Zarvos
- Country of origin: United States
- Original language: English
- No. of seasons: 2
- No. of episodes: 12

Production
- Executive producers: Tig Notaro; Kate Robin; M. Blair Breard; Louis C.K.; Diablo Cody; Dave Becky
- Producers: Cara DiPaolo; Andrew Balek; Lori-Etta Taub; Megan Mascena Gaspar; Erin O'Malley; Melissa Blake; Trish Hofmann; Nicole Holofcener
- Production locations: Texas City, Texas, USA
- Cinematography: Rhet Bear
- Editors: Tara Timpone and Peter B. Ellis
- Camera setup: Jeff Bollman
- Running time: 25 minutes
- Production companies: Zero Dollars and Zero Sense Productions; Good Egg Productions, Inc.; Pig Newton, Inc.; 3 Arts Entertainment; FXP (Note: Credited as FX Productions for pilot); Amazon Studios

Original release
- Network: Amazon Prime Video
- Release: November 5, 2015 – September 8, 2017

One Mississippi is an American comedy television series created by comedian Tig Notaro and Diablo Cody. The pilot episode, directed by Nicole Holofcener, aired on Amazon Prime Video on November 5, 2015, and was picked up for a full series after positive feedback from audiences. One Mississippi premiered on September 9, 2016. On November 14, 2016, Amazon renewed the show for a second season, which was released on Amazon on September 8, 2017. On January 18, 2018, the series was canceled after two seasons which Amazon explained as "part of a move towards bigger, wider-audience series". Eventually as the show is produced by FXP, A division of FX Networks (also owned by Disney) and Disney Television Studios, Disney pulled One Mississippi from Amazon Prime Video, although it has since returned. Currently One Mississippi streams on Disney+ Star internationally and on Hulu in the U.S. as well.

== Plot ==
Los Angeles radio host Tig Bavaro returns to Bay St. Louis, Mississippi, after receiving news that her mother, Caroline, will be taken off life support following an unexpected fall. Recovering from both a double mastectomy and a C. difficile infection, Tig moves in temporarily alongside her brother Remy and her stepfather, Bill. While caring for family affairs after Caroline's death, Tig learns about her mother's past as it was lived, rather than as Tig first remembered it, and in doing so rediscovers life in Bay St. Louis.

== Cast ==
=== Main ===
- Tig Notaro as Tig Bavaro
- Noah Harpster as Remy
- John Rothman as Bill
- Cailey Fleming as Young Tig

=== Recurring ===
- Rya Kihlstedt as Caroline
- Casey Wilson as Brooke
- Stephanie Allynne as Kate
- Sheryl Lee Ralph as Felicia Hollingsworth
- Carly Jibson as Desiree
- Beth Grant as Mellie Saint-Clair
- Carol Mansell as Beulah Lancaster
- Timm Sharp as Jack Hoffman

== Episodes ==
Season	Episodes		Originally released
1	6	1	November 5, 2015
1	6	5	September 9, 2016
2	6		September 8, 2017

=== Season 1 (2015–16) ===
No. overall	No. in season	Title	Directed by	Written by	Original release date
1	1	"Pilot"	Nicole Holofcener	Diablo Cody & Tig Notaro	November 5, 2015
Tig is a breast cancer patient whose mother is dying. Tig heads from her home in Los Angeles to Mississippi to say goodbye with her brother and stepdad. After her mother dies, Tig's girlfriend, Brooke, arrives for moral support. Tig is unsure what to do with her life now, but at the funeral, she decides to stay in town for a while.
2	2	"Effects"	Nicole Holofcener	Kate Robin	September 9, 2016
Tig discusses the details of Caroline's death with Bill and begins working to let go of her possessions that were originally Caroline's. Bill encourages Tig to investigate treatments for C. difficile, while Tig restores her mother's chair as a gift to a family friend.
3	3	"The Cat's Out"	Nicole Holofcener	Cara DiPaolo	September 9, 2016
Tig is blamed for Bill's cat escaping, while Tig's father Mick insists on leading a search for the cat. While searching, Tig and Remy discover her mother had another son out of wedlock. After the search, Tig begins recording her show at a local radio station and meets Kate, a local sound engineer and fan of her work.
4	4	"Let the Good Times Roll"	Ken Kwapis	Robbie Pickering	September 9, 2016
As her health improves, Tig prepares to return to Los Angeles after the Bay St. Lucille Mardi Gras parade. Tig fills in for her mother as the queen of the parade and is interviewed by Jessie, a flirtatious local reporter. After a call with Brooke goes worse than expected, Tig turns around from the airport and returns to Bay St. Lucille.
5	5	"How 'bout Now, How 'bout Right Now"	Ken Kwapis	Stephanie Allynne & Tig Notaro	September 9, 2016
Following her break-up, Tig meets with the reporter Jessie. Remy flirts with Vicky after a Civil War reenactment. While at Jessie's apartment Tig misses a family dinner planned by Bill, and when returning home argues with Bill about her parents' marriage and treatment of her sexual abuse.
6	6	"New Contact"	Shira Piven	Melissa Blake	September 9, 2016
Tig returns to Los Angeles, where she retrieves her belongings from Brooke and is faced with the cancellation of her radio show. In a flashback, Caroline discovers her father sexually abused Tig as a child, and she confronts young Tig about being a survivor. After an initially stressful oncology appointment and texting Kate about a spot at the Bay St. Lucille station, Tig returns home to Mississippi once more.

=== Season 2 (2017) ===
No. overall	No. in season	Title	Directed by	Written by	Original release date
7	1	"I Want to Hold Your Hand"	Tig Notaro	Stephanie Allynne & Tig Notaro	September 8, 2017
Hoping to get more intimate with her producer, Kate, Tig attends a party at her New Orleans apartment; Bill is oblivious to the attentions of an admirer; Remy makes a joke that leads to a political disagreement with a lady friend.
8	2	"Into the Light"	Ken Kwapis	Stephanie Allynne & Tig Notaro	September 8, 2017
Tig goes on a complicated date. Bill makes a connection with a woman in his office building. Remy also meets someone, at a church. A mysterious crystal brings the family together
9	3	"Kiss Me and Smile for Me"	Ken Kwapis	Kate Robin	September 8, 2017
Tig and Kate deal with negative reactions to their radio show, leading them to a career opportunity. Remy and Bill attend an emotionally charged party at the senior center, while Tig and Kate go fishing and their relationship deepens.
10	4	"Who Do You Think You Are?"	Wendey Stanzler	Zoe Jarman	September 8, 2017
Kate pulls back but might be jealous of Tig's chemistry with a sexy musician. Bill and Remy separately attempt to rise to challenges presented by dating Felicia and Desiree.
11	5	"Can't Fight This Feeling"	Minkie Spiro	Cara DiPaolo	September 8, 2017
Frustrated by the impossibility of a relationship with Kate, Tig withdraws. Kate has a disturbing encounter at work which infuriates Tig. Remy hosts a dinner at Bill's house with an unexpectedly long guest list.
12	6	"I'm Alive"	Minkie Spiro	Kate Robin	September 8, 2017
Thwarted in their attempt to deal with their uncomfortable work situation, Tig takes their situation to the airwaves and tells a powerful personal story. Bill attends a wedding with Felicia and makes an impression on her family. Tig supports Bill and Remy, as the men face difficult truths. Tig and Kate go to a new place in their relationship.

== Reception ==
One Mississippi received positive reviews from critics. Rotten Tomatoes gives the series a 96% rating based on reviews from 40 critics, with the site's critical consensus stating: "One Mississippi proves an honest vehicle for its moving dramatic narrative, observational comedy, and the genuine acting skills of its lead, Tig Notaro." Metacritic gives the series a 77 out of 100 score based on reviews from 20 critics.
