= David Huntsberger =

American comedian (born 1979)

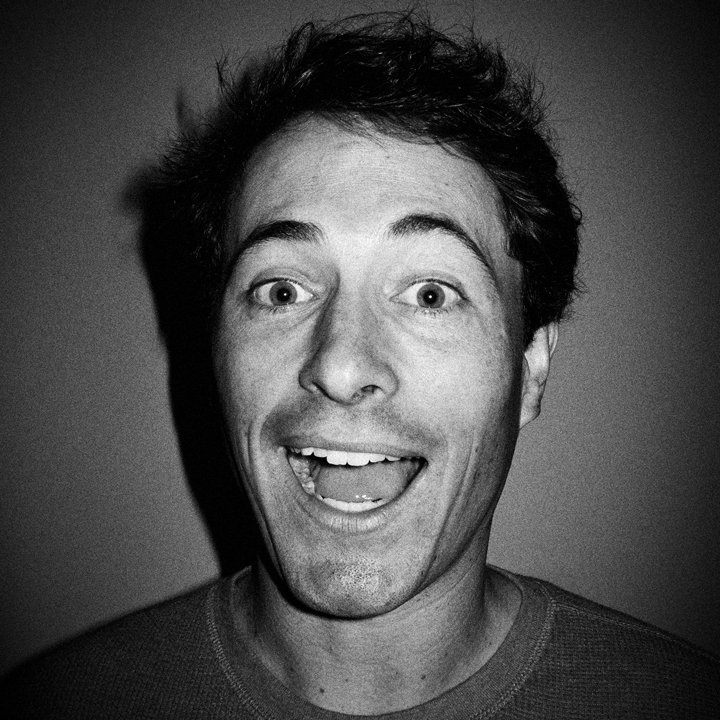
- David Huntsberger, photo by Kyle Mizono.
- Born: September 12, 1979 (age 47); Reno, Nevada United States

Comedy career
- Years active: 2003-present
- Medium: Stand-up
- Genres: Observational comedy, Surreal humor
- Website: davidhuntsberger.com

David Huntsberger (born September 12, 1979) is an American comedian, best known as the co-host of the Professor Blastoff podcast and host of the Reactor television show on the SyFy channel. He is a frequent guest on the podcasts Alison Rosen is Your New Best Friend, Sklarbro Country (voice of "High Vitale") and Doug Loves Movies. He has recorded three comedy CDs with Stand Up! Records: Hello Robot (2005), Humanitis (2011), and Explosion Land (2013). Huntsberger has appeared on Comedy Central's Premium Blend and NBC's Last Comic Standing. He has written for the television show The Benson Interruption on Comedy Central.

Until 2015, Huntsberger, along with Tig Notaro and Kyle Dunnigan, co-hosted the podcast Professor Blastoff on the Earwolf network.

David Huntsberger appeared as himself in the documentary Welcome to Bridgetown. In 2009, he also helped create The Tig Series: An Interview with Tig Notaro and Zach Galifianakis.

== Personal life ==
David Huntsberger was born and grew up in and around Reno, Nevada. He attained a Bachelor of Science degree in Civil Engineering from Colorado State University. After college, he worked as a substitute teacher in San Diego, California. From 2004 to 2008, Huntsberger lived in Austin, Texas, later moving to Los Angeles, California begrudgingly.

== Space Cave ==
One month after the final episode of Professor Blastoff, David Huntsberger released the first episode of The Space Cave. The show generally discusses science.

David Huntsberger talked about starting a new podcast in the last episode of Professor Blastoff, also saying he wanted to use a recorded episode on Optogenetics as his first episode.
