= Stephanie Allynne =

American actress, writer, comedian, director, and producer. (born 1985)

- Born: September 19, 1985 (age 41)
- Occupations: Actress; writer; director; comedian; producer
- Years active: 2009–present
- Spouse: Tig Notaro (m. 2015)
- Children: 2

Stephanie Allynne (born September 19, 1985) is an American actress, writer, comedian, and director. She is best known for her roles in In a World... (2013), Dream Corp, LLC (2016), One Mississippi (2016–17), and The L Word: Generation Q (2019–2023). She received a Primetime Emmy Award nomination in 2024 for Outstanding Directing for the comedy special Hello, Again.

== Biography ==
Allynne moved back and forth between southern California and Buffalo, New York, for most of her youth. She headed to Los Angeles at the age of 18 and joined the Upright Citizens Brigade. She performs regularly with ASSSSCAT, Wild Horses, and Last Day of School: The Text Message show. Allynne started making numerous appearances on television including The League, The Mindy Project, Happy Endings, 2 Broke Girls, Kroll Show, and Key & Peele. Allynne wrote and co-starred in One Mississippi with her wife Tig Notaro. The show was a loose autobiography about their lives. Allynne is developing an hour drama for HBO. In 2022, Allynne co-directed the film Am I Ok? starring Dakota Johnson. Am I Ok? premiered at The Sundance Film Festival and was acquired by HBO Max. Allynne was nominated for an Emmy in 2024 for Outstanding Directing for the comedy special Hello, Again which premiered on Prime Video

== Personal life ==
Allynne was a ranked CIF First Team All-State Varsity basketball player in high school. She was awarded the Pepsi Athlete of the Year award in 2003 and is a member of the elite 1000-Point Club, scoring over 1000 points by her Junior year.

Allynne married comedian Tig Notaro on October 24, 2015. According to Allynne, before her relationship with Notaro she had never dated women, saying, "I was so into Tig and I was falling in love with her and I didn't know how to identify it because I thought I was straight." In June 2016, their twin sons were born via surrogate.

== Filmography ==
=== Film ===
Year	Title	Role	Notes
2012	Tomorrow	Paige	Short film
2012	Turkey Day	Jane	Short film
2013	K.I.T.	C.J.	Short film
2013	In a World...	Nancy	
2013	Gregory Go Boom	Willie, Date 1	Short film
2013	The Boyfriend Experience: Girls & Ribs	James's GF	Short film
2013	Librarians	Lisa	Short film
2014	Our RoboCop Remake	Female Shop Owner	Segment: "Scene 26"
2014	No Is a Full Sentence	Madison	Short film; also wrote and produced
2015	People Places Things	Charlie	
2015	Donald and Jess		Short film
2015	Clown Service	Clown Dispatcher	Short film
2015	Unengaged	Nicki	Short film
2015	Let's Do It		Short film
2016	Punching Henry	Zoe	
2016	Mike and Dave Need Wedding Dates	Officer Stephanie	
2016	The Fun Company	Parker	Short film; also wrote, produced and directed
2016	First to Last	Her	Short film
2017	Dave Made a Maze	Brynn	
2017	All Nighter	Tracy	
2017	Please Stand By	Nurse	
2018	Pacific Rim: Uprising	Amara's Mother	
2018	Coda	Kristin	Short film
2018	Someone You Know	Amelia	Short film
2018	The Front Runner	SF TV Producer	
2022	Am I OK?	—N/a	Director and producer
TBA	Anxious People	TBA	Post-production

=== Television ===
Year	Title	Role	Notes
2009–2015	UCB Comedy Originals	Herself	4 episodes; wrote 1 episode
2010–2015	Funny or Die	Various	
2011	The Back Room	Annette Bening	Episode: "Rich Fulcher"
2011	Can't Get Arrested	Angelica Fritzman	Episode: "If the Glove Doesn't Fit..."
2011–2013	The Midnight Show	Herself	3 episodes
2012	Key & Peele	Karen	Episode: "Flicker"
2012	Happy Endings	Stephanie	Episode: "You Snooze, You Bruise"
2012	Jimmy Kimmel Live!	Daughter	1 episode
2012	The Aquabats! Super Show!	Lanolin Lady!	Episode: "Showtime"
2012	Up All Night	Vanessa	Episode: "Another Saturday Night"
2012	2 Broke Girls	Laughing Girl	Episode: "And the Pre-Approved Credit Card"
2012	2 Broke Girls	Fun Girl #2	Episode: "And the Candy Manwich"
2012–2015	Comedy Bang! Bang!	Stephanie	5 episodes
2012–2015	Animation Domination High-Def	Various (voice)	8 episodes
2013	Bro-Dependent	Carolyn	Miniseries
2013	The Mindy Project	Tash	Episode: "Mindy's Birthday"
2013	CollegeHumor Originals	20s-Something Woman	Episode: "Why Can't You Use Phones on Planes?"
2013	The League	Sarah	Episode: "The Bringer Show"
2013–2014	The Birthday Boys	Various	3 episodes
2014	Kroll Show	Becca	Episode: "Sponsored by Stamps"
2014	Dinner and a Show	Claudia	TV Pilot
2014	Maron	Shay	Episode: "Boomer Lives"
2015	Assassin Banana	Grapefruit Reporter / Crab Apple (voice)	Miniseries; 1 episode
2015	Guy Code		Episode: "Show You My Tips"
2016	Netflix Presents: The Characters	Bus Station Employee	Episode: "Lauren Lapkus"
2016–2017	Animals.	Various (voice)	3 episodes
2016	Dream Corp LLC	Joey Powell	Main cast (season 1)
2016–2017	One Mississippi	Kate	10 episodes; also writer
2017	Bajillion Dollar Propertie$	Aisha	Episode: "A Divided House"
2017	Twin Peaks	Soccer Mom	2 episodes
2018	Love	Kelly	2 episodes
2018–2023	Craig of the Creek	Marie (voice)	Recurring; 3 episodes
2018	Room 104	Sarah	Episode: "The Return"
2019	Bob's Burgers	Susan (voice)	Episode: "Lorenzo's Oil? No, Linda's"
2019–2022	The L Word: Generation Q	Natalie "Nat" Bailey	14 episodes
2020	Indebted	Kris	Episode: "Everybody's Talking About Neighbors"
2022	Reboot	Mallory	Episode: "Bewitched"
2024	Grey's Anatomy	Cassandra	Episode: "She Used to Be Mine"
2024	Based on a True Story	Christa	2 episodes
