= Aspecialthing Records =

- Founded: 2006
- Founder: Ryan McManemin, Matt Belknap
- Genre: Comedy
- Country of origin: U.S.
- Location: Los Angeles, California
- Official website: astrecords.com

Aspecialthing Records is a stand-up comedy record label started by Matt Belknap and Ryan McManemin. Belknap was the creator of aspecialthing.com, an internet message board especially popular with West Coast comedy fans. McManemin was an executive at Sony/MGM and longtime member of the message board.

Using the site as a launching pad, in late 2006 they announced to the web community that they would be starting their own record label, Aspecialthing Records. In February of the following year, comedian Jen Kirkman's Self Help was the first album released on the new label.

== Podcasts ==
In addition to making comedy albums, Belknap and McManemin are active podcast producers. Belknap produces and co-hosts Never Not Funny, the Jimmy Pardo Podcast, and with McManemin produces Doug Benson's Doug Loves Movies and Greg Proops's The Smartest Man in the World, among other shows.

== Awards ==
In 2017 Aspecialthing won the 2017 Grammy Award for Best Comedy Album and both McManemin and Belknap received award statues. They also received certificates that stated that they were not to melt down their statues nor charge admission to see them.

== Releases ==
- Jen Kirkman - Self Help
- Jonah Ray - This Is Crazy Mixed Up Plumbing (7")
- Never Not Funny: Volume One
- Paul F. Tompkins - Impersonal
- Scott Aukerman - Scott Aukerman's Koo Koo Roo's Greatest Hits
- The Sklar Brothers - Sklar Maps
- Doug Benson - Professional Humoredian
- Andrew Daly - Nine Sweaters
- R.O. Manse - R.O. Magic: The Best of R.O. Manse
- Jimmy Pardo & Scott Aukerman - Never Not Christmas
- Comedy By The Numbers© - Book-On-Tape CD!
- Greg Proops - Elsewhere
- Paul F. Tompkins - Freak Wharf
- Comedy Death-Ray - Xmas CD 2009
- Kyle Kinane - Death of the Party
- Wayne Federman - The Chronicles of Federman (three volumes)
- Greg Proops - Proops Digs In! (EP)
- John Roy - "Alexander Hamilton"
- Dan Telfer - Fossil Record (EP)
- Paul F. Tompkins - Sir, You Have Fooled Me Twice (EP)
- Comedy Death-Ray - Xmas CD 2010
- Dave Hill - Let Me Turn You On
- Paul F. Tompkins - You Should Have Told Me (DVD)
- Jen Kirkman - Hail to the Freaks
- Liam McEneaney - Comedian
- Baron Vaughn - Raised By Cable
- Jay Larson - Self-Diagnosed
- WTF with Marc Maron: The First 100 Episodes
- Jonah Ray - Hello, Mr. Magic Plane Person, Hello (10")
- Dan Telfer - Tendrils of Ruin
- Jim Hamilton - Poems About the Ocean
- Michelle Biloon - You Can Be an Asshole
- Brent Weinbach - Mostly Live
- Nate Bargatze - Yelled At By a Clown
- Jimmy Pardo - Sprezzatura
- Mike Schmidt - The Big Angry
- Bob Odenkirk and Brandon Wardell - Amateur Hour
- Megan Koester - Tertium Non Datur
- Kyle Gass Band - Live in Palmdale
