= Andy Daly =

American actor and comedian (born 1971)

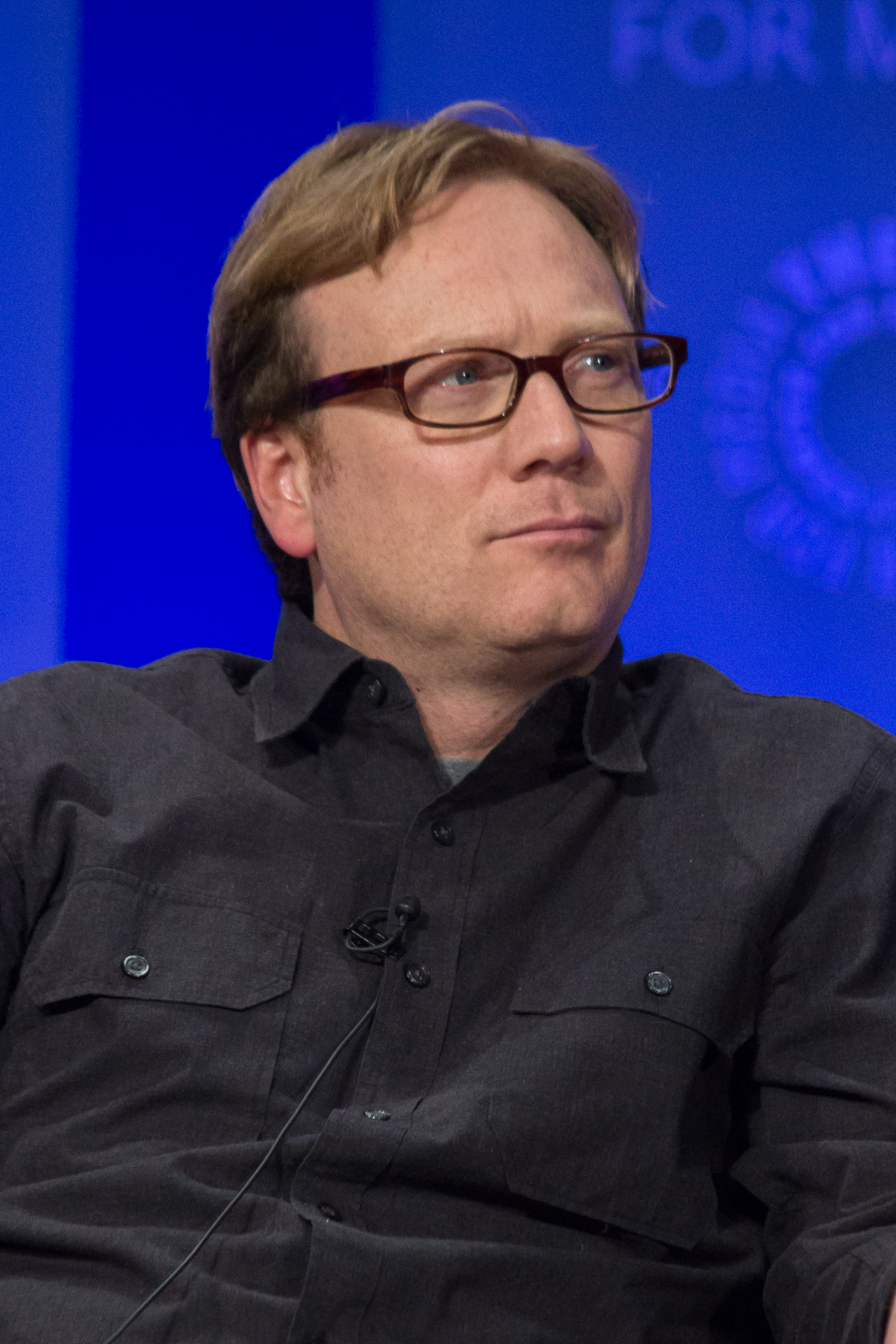
- Daly at the 2015 PaleyFest
- Born: Andrew Daly; April 15, 1971 (age 55); Mount Kisco, New York, U.S.
- Education: Ithaca College (BFA)
- Occupations: Actor; comedian
- Years active: 1996–present
- Spouse: Carri Levinson (m. 2004)
- Children: 2
- Website: andydaly.com

Andrew Daly (born April 15, 1971) is an American actor and comedian. He starred as Forrest MacNeil on the Comedy Central series Review, and had a supporting role in the HBO comedy series Eastbound & Down as Terrence Cutler. He has also made recurring appearances on television programs such as Silicon Valley, Veep, Modern Family, Black-ish, Trial & Error, the Netflix series The Who Was? Show, Reno 911!, and Comedy Bang! Bang!, as well as animated series such as Rick and Morty, Solar Opposites, Bob's Burgers, Adventure Time, The Great North, and Harley Quinn.

== Early life ==
Daly was born in Mount Kisco, New York and grew up in New Jersey. He graduated in 1989 from Ridgewood High School in Ridgewood, New Jersey, and then attended Ithaca College, where he received a bachelor's degree in drama.

== Career ==
After college, Daly moved to New York City, where he performed, along with Andy Secunda, in the sketch comedy duo The Two Andys, which appeared at the 1999 Aspen Comedy Festival. He was also a part of the Mainstage company at Chicago City Limits as an improvisational actor.

When the Upright Citizens Brigade relocated to New York from Chicago in 1996, Daly was one of the first New Yorkers to study improvisation with the group and performed in many of the earliest shows produced by the UCB. He was a member of the long-form improvisation group The Swarm, which was assembled and directed by Amy Poehler.

=== Television ===
During the late 1990s, Daly appeared frequently in sketches on Late Night with Conan O'Brien and lent his voice to Robert Smigel's "TV Funhouse" cartoons on Saturday Night Live.

In 2000, Daly joined the cast of MADtv. He was a featured player in the show's sixth season and returned as a full cast member the following season.

He next appeared on television in the main cast of Comedy Central's parody news show Crossballs and later played several different characters on Reno 911!, recurring as "Brad the Friendly Homeowner". He also worked as a correspondent on The Showbiz Show with David Spade for all three seasons and as an advocate on both seasons of Lewis Black's Root of All Evil.

In 2007, Daly appeared as a Benjamin Franklin impersonator in an episode of The Office entitled "Ben Franklin".

In 2008, Daly joined the cast of the HBO series Eastbound & Down as Terrence Cutler. That same year, Daly was also the host of a Match Game revival which never aired.

He made frequent appearances on HBO's The Life and Times of Tim, Adult Swim's Delocated, and IFC's Comedy Bang! Bang! as well as Adventure Time, for which he provided the voices of Wyatt and The King of Ooo. He is also the voice of Krombopulos Michael on Rick and Morty, and Two-Face on Harley Quinn.

Daly appeared in the NBC sitcom The Paul Reiser Show, which was a midseason replacement for the 2010–11 television season. The show was cancelled after two episodes.

Starting in 2014, Daly had guest starred in the ABC sitcom Modern Family as Principal Brown and has also played recurring roles on ABC's Blackish, HBO's Silicon Valley and Veep, and NBC's Trial & Error.

From 2014 to 2017, Daly starred in, executive produced, and wrote episodes of the Comedy Central series Review, which he co-adapted from the Australian series Review with Myles Barlow.

From 2016 to 2019, Daly appeared in commercials for CarMax.

Ever since 2018, Daly has been the voice of the character Officer Keys in the Disney Channel animated series Big City Greens.

In 2025, Daly was cast in the television movie Mountainhead, written by Succession creator Jesse Armstrong. The film is scheduled to release the same year May 31, on both HBO and Max.

=== Film ===
Daly has appeared in numerous films, most notably as courtside announcer Dick Pepperfield in the 2008 film Semi-Pro starring Will Ferrell.

In 2004, Daly appeared in the movie Christmas with the Kranks as a shopper who is bribed by Jamie Lee Curtis' character Nora Krank into giving her a Christmas ham.

In 2010, Daly co-starred as Mayor Brown in the 3D live action/CGI film version of Yogi Bear and appeared in She's Out of My League as Fuller.

He had a small role in the 2011 film, Transformers: Dark of the Moon as a mailroom worker.

In 2016, he played Principal Dwight in Middle School: The Worst Years of My Life which was directed by Steve Carr.

=== Stand-up comedy ===
Daly does many different characters in his stand-up. In 2007, a character named "Jerry O'Hearn" was featured on the Comedy Death-Ray compilation album. In 2008, Daly released the critically acclaimed Nine Sweaters, a comedy album compiled from a nine-week residency at Comedy Death-Ray's Tuesday night shows, on Aspecialthing Records.

In December 2010, Daly performed stand-up on The Benson Interruption on Comedy Central.

=== Podcasting ===
Daly has made a number of appearances on podcasts such as Comedy Bang! Bang!, Superego, How Did This Get Made?, The Nerdist Podcast, Office Ladies, and Never Not Funny. From 2012-2015, Daly appeared in five episodes of Paul F. Tompkins' The Dead Authors Podcast, playing such "dead author" characters as Robert Louis Stevenson and L. Ron Hubbard. In 2014, he began hosting the limited-run Earwolf podcast The Andy Daly Podcast Pilot Project, which continued in 2018 with a second season of 8 episodes. He currently hosts the podcast Bonanas for Bonanza. He is well known for his character Dalton Wilcox, which he has played on Comedy Bang! Bang! (the TV show and podcast), Bonanas for Bonanza, The Andy Daly Podcast Pilot Project, Conan, and other shows.

== Personal life ==
Daly lives in Los Angeles and is married to actress Carri Levinson. They have two daughters.

== Filmography ==
=== Film ===
Andy Daly film work
Year	Title	Role	Notes
1999	The Brave Little Toaster to the Rescue	Murgatroid	Voice
2004	Christmas with the Kranks	Husband	
2006	School for Scoundrels	Classmate	
2007	Dante's Inferno	Lucan, "Right On" Glutton, Jim Jones, Airport Screener, Ulysses' Naysayer	Voice
2007	What Love Is	Wayne	
2007	Wild Girls Gone	Fred	
2008	Semi-Pro	Dick Pepperfield	
2008	What Happens in Vegas	Curtis	
2008	Tenure	Warren	
2009	Post Grad	Lloyd Hastings	
2009	The Informant!	Marty Allison	
2010	She's Out of My League	Mr. Fuller	
2010	Freak Dance	Gentleman Weed Fiend	
2010	Life as We Know It	Scott	
2010	Yogi Bear	Mayor Brown	
2011	High Road	Mr. Doobin	
2011	Transformers: Dark of the Moon	Donnie	
2011	Butter	Radio Announcer	
2012	Big Miracle	Don Davis	
2013	A Haunted House	Steve	
2014	Jason Nash Is Married	Marty Denman	
2014	A Better You	Neighbor	
2016	Middle School: The Worst Years of My Life	Principal Ken Dwight	
2016	FML	Dr. Todd	
2017	Table 19	Luke Pflaffler	
2021	The Space Between	Cameroon Robbins	
2021	Home Sweet Home Alone	Mike Mercer	
2022	Kimi	Christian Holloway	
2022	The People We Hate at the Wedding	Bill	
2023	Jules	Aaron Campbell	
2024	Unfrosted	Isaiah Lamb	
2024	Big City Greens the Movie: Spacecation	Officer Keys	Voice

=== Television ===
Andy Daly television work
Year	Title	Role	Notes
1996	Spin City	Payroll Guy	Episode: "The High and the Mighty"
1996	Saturday Night Live	Joseph of Arimathea, additional voices ("TV Funhouse" segment)	Voice, recurring role
1999	Upright Citizens Brigade	Bathtub Friar	Episode: "Infested with Friars"
2000	TV Funhouse	Joseph of Arimathea	Voice, episode: "Christmas Day"
2000–02	MADtv	Various	38 episodes
2004	Crossballs	Various	15 episodes; also writer
2005–20	Reno 911!	Various	6 episodes
2005	Drake & Josh	Movie Goer	2 episodes
2006–07	Entourage	Chris	2 episodes
2007	American Body Shop	EPA Inspector	Episode: "Fluids"
2007	The Office	Gordon (Benjamin Franklin)	Episode: "Ben Franklin"
2008	Match Game	Host (himself)	Pilot episode
2008–12	The Life & Times of Tim	Various	Voice, 18 episodes
2009	The Closer	Richard Tracy	Episode: "Tapped Out"
2009–12	Eastbound & Down	Principal Terrence Cutler	10 episodes
2010	Greek	Tom Hilgendorf	Episode: "Your Friends and Neighbors"
2010	Players	Rick	Episode: "The Intervention"
2010–12	Delocated	Bryce Grieke	6 episodes
2011	The Paul Reiser Show	Brad	7 episodes
2011	Good Vibes	Lord Clive Goodspeed, MTV Executive	Voice, 2 episodes
2012	Are You There, Chelsea?	Marty Mills	Episode: "Boots"
2012	Regular Show	Various voices	Voice, 3 episodes
2012	Last Man Standing	Mr. Peckem	Episode: "Tree of Strife"
2012–16	Comedy Bang! Bang!	Various	7 episodes
2013	Drunk History	Theodore Roosevelt	Episode: "Wild West"
2013–14	Kroll Show	Luke, Host	2 episodes
2013–14	The League	Ethan Coque	2 episodes
2013–19	Modern Family	Principal Prince Brown	8 episodes
2014	Enlisted	Rodney Spratz	Episode: "Rear D Day"
2014	Playing House	Gary Beecher	Episode: "Totes Kewl"
2014	Bad Teacher	Dale	Episode: "The 6th Grade Lock-In"
2014	Major Crimes	Mr. Baird, Richard Tracy	Episode: "Frozen Assets"
2014	Mr. Pickles	Doctor, Driver	Voice, episode: "Coma"
2014–24	Bob's Burgers	Various voices	Voice, 10 episodes
2014–17	Adventure Time	King of Ooo, Wyatt	Voice, 13 episodes
2014–18	Silicon Valley	Dr. Crawford	8 episodes
2014–17	Review	Forrest MacNeil	22 episodes; also co-creator, executive producer, writer
2015	Aqua Teen Hunger Force	Presbobot, Flesh Train	Voice, 2 episodes
2015	The Spoils Before Dying	Artie Mann	3 episodes
2015	Rick and Morty	Krombopulos Michael	Voice, episode: "Mortynight Run"
2015–22	Black-ish	Dr. Evan Windsor	8 episodes
2015	Wander Over Yonder	Andy the Watchdog	Voice, episode: "The Eye on the Skullship"
2015–16	Grandfathered	Bruce	3 episodes
2016–25	American Dad!	Memphis Stormfront, additional voices	Voice, 32 episodes
2016	Bajillion Dollar Propertie$	Don Dimello	Episode: "Make Partner Part 2"
2016	Lady Dynamite	Dr. Achter	Episode: "A Vaginismus Miracle"
2016	Another Period	Charlton Wimbledon	Episode: "Trial of the Century"
2016–18	Future-Worm!	Mr. Zarlid	Voice, 2 episodes
2016	Mary + Jane	Edward Gregory	Episode: "420"
2016–21	Conan	Various	8 episodes
2017–18	Trial & Error	Thom Hinkle	3 episodes
2017	Brooklyn Nine-Nine	Jeffrey Bouché	Episode: "Cop-Con"
2017	Dice	Richard	2 episodes
2017	You're the Worst	Himself	Episode: "From the Beginning, I Was Screwed"
2017	Teachers	Officer Chuck Dorgan	Episode: "Dire Straights"
2018	The Simpsons	Judge Dowd	Voice, episode: "Fears of a Clown"
2018	The Who Was? Show	Ron	13 episodes
2018–25	Big City Greens	Officer Keys	Voice, 31 episodes
2018	Big Hero 6: The Series	Dr. Trevor Trengrove	Voice, episode: "Small Hiro One"
2018–23	Big Mouth	Dr. Wendy Engle, additional voices	Voice, 7 episodes
2018	The Good Place	Dave Katterttrune	Episode: "A Fractured Inheritance"
2018	The Shivering Truth	Angus Dindin	Voice, episode: "Tow and Shell"
2019	The Big Bang Theory	Nathan	Episode: "The Meteorite Manifestation"
2019	Veep	Keith Quinn	6 episodes
2019	Mao Mao: Heroes of Pure Heart	Teacher	Voice, episode: "Trading Day"
2019	Liza on Demand	Scott	Episode: "Magic Meadows"
2019–present	Harley Quinn	Two-Face, The President, Mister Miracle, Darryl Brown, Mr. Covington, High Owl	Voice, 10 episodes
2020–22	Solar Opposites	Tim Weekly	Voice, 10 episodes
2020–21	Central Park	Mr. Garth, Bar Patron #1	Voice, 2 episodes
2020	The George Lucas Talk Show	Himself	Episode: "THX-113GREAT"
2021–25	The Great North	Uncle Mike, Cheesecake	Voice, 25 episodes
2021	Adventure Time: Distant Lands	Wyatt	Voice, episode: "Together Again"
2021–22	Inside Job	J.R. Scheimpough	Voice; 18 episodes
2021	Stillwater	Mr. Whiskerton	Voice, episode: "Ghost Story"
2021	Creepshow	Clark "Murph" Murphy, Deputy Anton, Old Fella, Local Yokel	Voice, episode: "The Things in Oakwood's Past"
2022	American Auto	Frank	Episode: "Commercial"
2022	Close Enough	Obo	Voice, episode: "Robots with Benefits"
2022	The Boss Baby: Back in the Crib	Sheriff Potty Pardner	Voice, episode: "Potty Mouth"
2022	Birdgirl	Dr. Andy	Voice, episode: "Shoot from the Foop"
2022	StoryBots: Answer Time		Voice, episode: "Lasers"
2023	History of the World, Part II	Norwegian Ambassador	Episode: "VII"
2023	Digman!	#937	Voice, episode: "The Mile High Club"
2023–24	Royal Crackers	Ron Dennison, Young Luther Dennison	Voice, recurring role
2023	American Born Chinese	Dennis Taylor	Episode: "Commercial"
2023	Adventure Time: Fionna and Cake	Kheirosiphon / various	Voice, 2 episodes
2023—26	Kiff	Scarm Scaremly	Voice, 2 episodes
2023	Lessons in Chemistry	Dr. Richard Price	4 episodes
2023	Frasier	Roland	Episode: "The Fix Is In"
2023	Carol & the End of the World		Voice, episode: "The Beetle Broach"
2024	Krapopolis		Voice, episode: "Olive Oil Crisis"
2024	Kite Man: Hell Yeah!	Darryl Brown / various	Voice, 3 episodes
2024	Everybody Still Hates Chris	Stained Glass Jesus	Voice, 2 episodes
2024	Night Court	Fred Norton	Episode: "Feliz NaviDead"
2025	Common Side Effects	Christopher, Mysterious Passenger	Voice, 2 episodes
2025	Mountainhead	Casper	Television film
