= The Benson Interruption =

Stand-up comedy show starring Doug Benson

- Starring: Doug Benson
- Composer: Hard 'n Phirm
- Original language: English
- No. of seasons: 1
- No. of episodes: 6

Production
- Production locations: Music Box Theater (Hollywood, CA)
- Running time: 21 minutes
- Production companies: Generate; Omnipop Talent Group

Original release
- Network: Comedy Central
- Release: November 5 – December 17, 2010

The Benson Interruption is a stand-up comedy show on Comedy Central starring Doug Benson. The show was cancelled after one season. The concept of the show was that three stand-up comedians per episode perform their acts in front of an audience, with Benson sitting on a throne by the side of the stage. When the time to present a humorous punch line approaches, Benson interrupted the comic with a comment with the intent of adding to the humor of the joke.

The first season aired on Fridays at midnight on Comedy Central.

== History ==
The Benson Interruption was based on the live stage show Benson hosted in Los Angeles, California. The version shown on Comedy Central consisted of the same format.

== Episodes ==
Every episode featured at least one "tweet-off", where Benson and the current guest read Twitter posts off of their own Twitter accounts in an effort to outdo each other with funny tweets. The entire series was released on a bonus DVD with the album "Potty Mouth."

Episode	Airdate	Comedians (In order of appearance)
1x1	November 5, 2010	Nick Swardson, Nick Kroll, Chris Hardwick
1x2	November 12, 2010	Eugene Mirman, Rob Huebel, Mary Lynn Rajskub
1x3	November 19, 2010	Todd Barry, The Sklar Brothers, Paul Scheer
1x4	December 3, 2010	Michael Ian Black, Thomas Lennon, Andrew Daly
1x5	December 10, 2010	Brian Posehn, Greg Proops, Tig Notaro
1x6	December 17, 2010	T. J. Miller, Adam Carolla, Graham Elwood

== Podcast episodes ==
Starting January 21, 2011, unedited live shows of The Benson Interruption became available to download as podcasts.

Episode	Release date	Comedians (In order of appearance)
1	January 21, 2011	Moshe Kasher, Chelsea Peretti, Brendon Walsh, Marc Maron
2	February 22, 2011	Nick Swardson, Garfunkel and Oates, Anthony Jeselnik, Al Madrigal, Seán Cullen
3	April 1, 2011	Greg Proops, Eddie Pepitone, Jen Kirkman, Brody Stevens, The Sklar Brothers
4	April 21, 2011	Steve Agee, Chelsea Peretti, Bil Dwyer, Garfunkel and Oates
5	May 23, 2011	Tony Camin, Nikki Glaser, Myq Kaplan, Rob Cantrell, Chris Hardwick
6	June 23, 2011	Adam Burke, Dan Telfer, Amy Schumer, Sean Cullen
7	August 23, 2011	Samm Levine, Jonah Ray, Kumail Nanjiani, Chris Hardwick
8	September 14, 2011	T. J. Miller, Paul Scheer, Morgan Murphy, Pete Holmes, The Sklar Brothers
9	October 26, 2011	Nikki Glaser, Rob Cantrell, Tony Camin, Megan Neuringer, Michael Ian Black
10	November 12, 2011	Marc Maron, Matt Besser, Ali Wong, Rob Delaney, Chris Hardwick
11	January 17, 2012	David Huntsberger, Ngaio Bealum, Graham Elwood
12	February 27, 2012	Anthony Jeselnik, T. J. Miller, Nikki Glaser, Nick Kroll, Moshe Kasher, Chelsea Peretti, Pete Holmes
13	March 27, 2012	Scott Aukerman, Brendon Walsh, Chip Pope, Ari Shaffir, The Sklar Brothers
14	March 30, 2012	Brendon Walsh, Ryan Stout, Louis Katz, Howard Kremer, Jonah Ray
15	May 17, 2012	Jen Kirkman, Greg Proops, Harris Wittels, Brendon Walsh, Kumail Nanjiani
16	June 21, 2012	Jonah Ray, Rob Huebel, Graham Elwood, Matt Mira, Chelsea Peretti, Paul Scheer
17	August 27, 2012	Nikki Glaser, Tony Camin, Amy Schumer, Rob Cantrell, Graham Elwood, Kurt Metzger
18	October 15, 2012	Matt Mira, Ben Schwartz, Ari Shaffir, Daniel Kinno, Brody Stevens, Matt Besser
19	January 7, 2013	Sarah Silverman, Greg Proops, David Huntsberger, Matt Mira, Jonah Ray, Kumail Nanjiani
20	February 26, 2013	Zach Galifianakis, Jonah Ray, John Roy, Rory Scovel, Neal Brennan, Kumail Nanjiani
21	March 25, 2013	Eugene Mirman, John Evans, Jake Fogelnest, Geoff Tate, Eric Krug, Chris Cubas, Charlie Hodge, Hannibal Buress
22	June 24, 2013	Kumail Nanjiani, Jonah Ray, Todd Glass, Matt Mira, Rob Huebel, Bert Kreischer
23	September 18, 2013	Brian Posehn, Bob Odenkirk, Rob Cantrell, Trey Galyon, Nikki Glaser
24	November 4, 2013	Zach Galifianakis, Paul Scheer, Jonah Ray, Natasha Leggero, Geoff Tate, T.J. Miller
