= Professional Humoredian =

Live album by Doug Benson
- Released: July 15, 2008
- Genre: Comedy
- Length: 50:33
- Label: Aspecialthing

Doug Benson chronology
Professional Humoredian (2008)	Unbalanced Load (2009)

Professional Humoredian is the debut album by comedian Doug Benson, released by Aspecialthing Records

== Track listing ==
1. "Hey Everybody" – 3:51
2. "Doggie" – 1:27
3. "Ginormous" – 1:49
4. "Sex" – 3:17
5. "Cookies" – 0:41
6. "Weed" – 4:02
7. "Amazing Memory" – 4:11
8. "Anti-Truth" – 1:45
9. "Melting" – 1:26
10. "I Love Movies" – 4:42
11. "Super High Me" – 7:59
12. "Life Tips" – 5:13
13. "Happy Couples" – 1:30
14. "What Women Want" – 4:20
15. "Observational Comedy" – 4:20
