= Michelle Biloon =

American stand-up comic

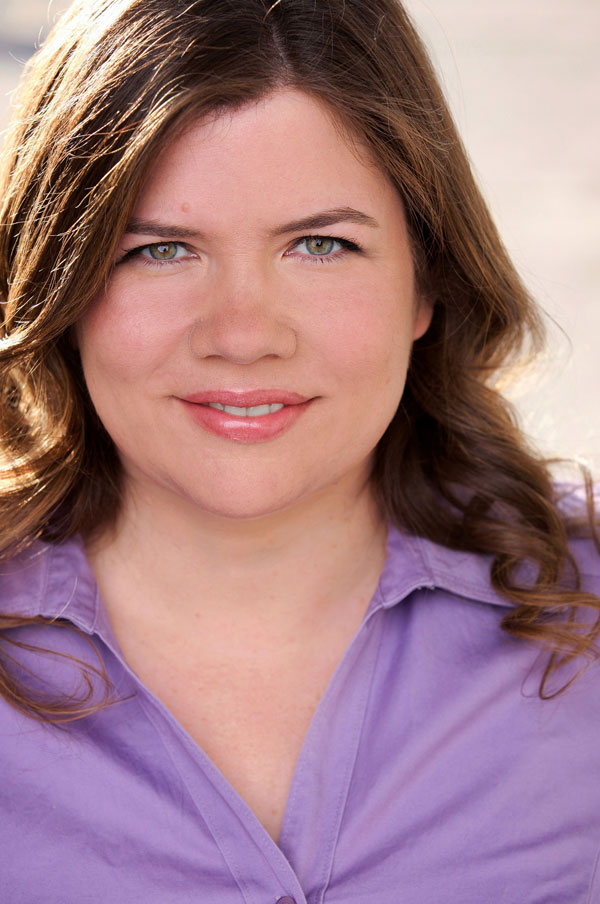
- Biloon in 2014
- Born: October 25, 1976; Fullerton, CA

Michelle Biloon is an American stand-up comic. Biloon started out in Austin, Texas and, after four years, moved to Los Angeles, then on to Philadelphia, where she currently resides and regularly performs. She has been heard on the podcasts 2 Dope Queens, Do You Need A Ride?, Comedy Bang Bang, Never Not Funny, and Doug Loves Movies. She has been featured on the TV shows Chelsea Lately, Comedy Central's Premium Blend, The Late Late Show with Craig Ferguson and The Gong Show with Dave Attell. She produced and starred in the popular podcasts "Walking With Michelle" and “Disagree to Agree With Michelle and Martha.” She also produced and hosted "THEBILOONCAST” and “The Biloon/Forrest Project.”

Michelle has released two stand-up comedy albums with the aspecialthing records label: “You Can Be An Asshole” in 2012 and “Permanent Hat” in 2020.

Born in Fullerton, California, she mostly grew up in northwestern Wisconsin before later moving to Austin, Texas, where she established her career.
