= Never Not Funny =

Comedy podcast

- Never Not Funny logo
- Genre: Comedy
- Language: English

Cast and voices
- Hosted by: Jimmy Pardo; Matt Belknap

Music
- Opening theme: "Mad at the World" (Daver)

Production
- Camera: Eliot Hochberg
- Production: Jimmy Pardo; Matt Belknap
- Length: Approx. 2 Hours

Technical specifications
- Video format: MP4
- Audio format: MP3

Publication
- Original release: April 4, 2006
- Provider: ART19, Misfit Toys Podcast Co-Op
- Updates: Wednesdays (free episodes) and Sundays (Platinum episodes)

Related
- Website: https://www.nevernotfunny.com

Never Not Funny is a podcast hosted by American comedian Jimmy Pardo, since spring 2006, currently releasing two episodes a week. He and producer/co-host Matt Belknap have appeared in every episode. Comedian Mike Schmidt appeared as co-host for season one, except for the final episode of the season, when his departure was announced.

The show moved to a pay format in March 2008, with the first twenty minutes of each show remaining available to non-paying subscribers. It subsequently returned to partial free distribution when it joined the Earwolf network in January 2014, with a premium subscription available for access to video and weekly bonus episodes. In late 2019, the show became fully independent again, hosted by ART19, later under the umbrella of their Misfit Toys Podcast Co-Op curated by Jimmy Pardo and Matt Belknap. The main weekly audio episode remains free, while video, additional weekly episodes, bonus content and full archives going back to 2006 are available to various tiers of Platinum subscribers.

== History ==
Never Not Funny began when Matt Belknap interviewed Pardo on the podcast for his popular alternative comedy forum A Special Thing. The two had previously discussed producing a podcast version of Jimmy's Los Angeles show "Running Your Trap," which he hosted at the Upright Citizens Brigade Theatre, but they hit it off so well on AST Radio that Pardo said "this is the show."

The first episode featured Pardo, Belknap, and guest Mike Schmidt. Pat Francis was scheduled for episode 2, but when he was unavailable, Schmidt (usually referred to by Pardo as "The Former Third Baseman" after the similarly named baseball player) became the permanent co-host. This arrangement continued for the first season. Every fourth episode would feature a guest such as Pat Francis, Scott Aukerman or Graham Elwood. Midway through the first season, the theme song was changed from a brief portion of an unnamed instrumental song by Jimmy's close friend Daver to "Mad At The World" by Daver, with sound bites from previous episodes mixed into the song. This three-man setup lasted for sixty episodes, including a clip show and two live shows recorded at the UCB Theatre. The show went through little change throughout the first season until episode sixty, when Jimmy announced that his relationship with Mike Schmidt had become strained through the years and that they had decided to go their separate ways; Schmidt left the show in an attempt to reconcile their friendship. Mike explained the situation on May 25, 2007, on his website. In March 2008, Mike started his own solo podcast named The 40 Year Old Boy. At the end of season six, Schmidt made his first return to the podcast, this time as a guest, when Pardo decided, "Life's too short.", and has been a frequent guest ever since.

Following Schmidt's departure, the show began its second season. Instead of the former three-man lineup, Pardo and Belknap appeared as the only regulars, along with a rotating guest every episode. Pat Francis was the guest for the first episode of the second season, which began the tradition of Francis being the "third chair" and appearing on every fourth episode. It was in the second season that the show received its first sponsorship, lasting only a few weeks. On episode 39 of the second season, it was announced that the show would move to a pay format beginning with season three. Listeners would have to pay to continue receiving the complete podcast, although the first twenty minutes of each episode would still be available for free. The subscription price was set to $19.99 for 26 episodes. They also hired Pardo's brother-in-law Andrew Koenig to record video of the show. Only 5 minute clips of the show were available on video during season three, which were hosted on Koenig's site Monkey Go Lucky, but beginning with season four, full video of the show became available for $24.99 (full video for season three was released retroactively several years later).

Midway through season six tragedy struck when Andrew Koenig died. An episode was released in remembrance, highlighting some of Koenig's best moments throughout his time on the show. Andrew's close friend Eliot Hochberg, who had been providing the video equipment, assumed his role as videographer. Shortly afterwards they hired an intern, Dan Katz, aka "Tabasco Ears", to look up material on the internet and take notes. Katz left the show at the beginning of season 11 and was replaced by Pop Culture Beast editor Garon Cockrell, aka "The Beast," shortly after.

On episode 1325, it was announced that at the beginning of season 14, Never Not Funny would change to a free show in audio format. Plus, Never Not Funny would also join the Earwolf podcast network, co-owned by Scott Aukerman (who was the guest on the episode and the only guest to appear in every season). Full audio would be available on Earwolf, iTunes and NNF's feed, while video of the episodes were part of the new "Players Club" package for Primo subscribers with 25 episodes per six-month season. Subscribers of the Players Club would also get an additional weekly lettered episode (A to Z), plus bonus material such as live shows.

In late 2019, the show left Earwolf to return to full independent status. Following a special 1000th episode on February 26, 2020, they launched a new Platinum monthly subscription service for the 26th season, continuing the free audio feed for the weekly numbered episode on Wednesday, with all Platinum subscribers getting both audio and video for the numbered episodes, weekly lettered episodes on Sunday and bonus episodes. Additional content was offered for higher subscription tiers, including full audio and video archives going back to the beginning (audio only for the first two seasons), occasional live stream shows and exclusive merchandise.

During the COVID-19 pandemic the show underwent some changes starting in March 2020, with shows being done remotely with video conferencing rather than in studio (with occasional shows done in the studio parking lot to allow for proper social distancing). A third weekly show was also added for subscribers on Friday, labelled the Isolation Files, which features the cast playing games, frequently run by fans of the show. They returned to in-studio shows in June 2021.

In September 2020 Jimmy Pardo and Matt Belknap founded the Misfit Toys Podcast Co-Op through ART19, where they serve as curators for independent comedy podcasts hosted by the company, including Never Not Funny and podcasts hosted by various friends of the show, including Todd Glass, Jen Kirkman, Doug Benson and former NNF co-host Mike Schmidt.

Spin-off shows have included Jimmy′s Records and Tapes, a video-only show featuring Pardo talking about music, and Playing Games With Jimmy Pardo, an audio-only game show with listeners calling in to play a variety of games with Pardo, Belknap and a celebrity guest.

== Show Format ==
The show is of the comedy talk variety, consisting of free-form conversation between Jimmy Pardo, Matt Belknap and a guest, usually from the comedy or music field. The top of the show currently consists of the show regulars (currently including video producer Eliot Hochberg and "intern" Garon Cockrell) and then bringing the guest into the mix after a half-hour. Topics discussed range from music and popular culture to personal lives and amusing or interesting anecdotes.

Pardo will also frequently slip into one of his many characters, including Cajun Jimmy, Plantation Jimmy, Dirty Carson, Actor Auditioning for a Blind Role, Stallone in a Bottle, Mad Dog Russo, Dice's Lady, Larry and Old Man Lizard.

Various recurring bits and games have developed on the show over the years, including "Stupid Question of the Week", "Judge Jimmy", "The Letter Game", "Sevens", "Oliver's Trivia", "Celebrity Sightings", "The Mail Is Here", "Doc Talk (Documentaries)" and "Doc Talk (Doctors)". Most of these are accompanied by theme songs created by friends and fans of the show.

Until the end of the third season, the show was recorded in a single take without any editing. After the 2008 Chino Hills earthquake forced the show to stop briefly (originally so Jimmy, Matt and guest Patton Oswalt could check on family members) the podcast has had one or more small break per episode, during which Matt plugs projects and social media accounts of the hosts and guests.

== Pardcast-A-Thon ==
A mini episode was released at the beginning of season six that announced Never Not Funny would be doing a live, streaming podcast on their website to raise money in benefit of Smile Train. The first annual Pardcast-A-Thon took place on Black Friday 2009. Pardo, Belknap and Pat Francis welcomed guests Maria Bamford, Jon Hamm, Rich Sommer and Oscar Nunez. By the end of the night, they raised over $12,000.

The next year at Pardcast-A-Thon 2010, they changed the venue to the Acme Comedy Theater and went 12 hours instead of 9 to give even more of a telethon vibe (and raise more money). At the end of the night at 6 am, they raised $27,000. Guests included Rob Corddry, Sarah Silverman, Aimee Mann and Andy Richter.

For Pardcast-A-Thon 2011, the set up was the same as the previous year. Guests included Amy Poehler, Lisa Loeb, Walter Koenig and Adam Carolla. By the end of the event, the amount of money raised was almost double the previous year's total with $41,000.

Pardcast-A-Thon 2012 has a goal of $50,000 by the end of the night. The hours were changed to 12 pm to 12 am PST so people on the East Coast could stay up later and donate more. Guests included Bob Saget, Conan O'Brien, Simon Helberg, Kevin Nealon, Colin Hay and Zach Galifianakis. The goal of $50,000 was raised after 13.5 hours and midway through an anonymous donor said they would match the end total, making the grand total over $100,000.

The 5th Annual Pardcast-A-Thon raised over $130,000 (half of that thanks to the anonymous donor again) by the end of the night. Wayne Federman sat in for the whole event playing music on keyboard. Guests included Patton Oswalt, Jack Wagner, Phil Hendrie, Janet Varney, Bob Odenkirk and Matt Walsh.

On the Pardcast-A-Thon 2014 Federman was the house band again and $156,000 was raised. Guests included Weird Al Yankovic, Jack McBrayer, Paul Dooley, Fred Willard, Billy Eichner, Patton Oswalt and Sarah Silverman.

Pardo and Belknap stated in a Season 16 episode that The 7th Annual Pardcast-A-Thon will not take place on Black Friday 2015, due to many scheduling conflicts in the past. The 7th annual Pardcast-A-Thon took place on March 5, 2016. The event raised over $169,000. Guests included Rob Corddry, Timothy Omundson, Mike McShane, Conan O'Brien, Tommy Shaw, Jon Hamm and more with Wayne Federman on piano.

For Pardcast-A-Thon 2017, the venue changed to Flapper's Comedy Club after the podcast had a residency there. It raised $140,000. Guests included Jon Cryer, Rachel Bloom, Randall Park, Richard Kind, Angela Kinsey, Kumail Nanjiani and Mindy Sterling.

Pardcast-A-Thon returned to Flapper's on March 3, 2018. Guests included Kevin Nealon, Rory O'Malley, Cristela Alonzo, and Scott Aukerman. Over $200,000 was raised, and the lifetime total crossed the $1 million mark.

On May 4, 2019, the tenth Pardcast-A-Thon took place at Flappers, with the cast joined by guests including D'Arcy Carden, Ahmed Best and Paula Poundstone.

Due to the COVID-19 pandemic the 2020 Pardcast-A-Thon was delayed from a scheduled May date until October 10, 2020, and was a 6-hour live virtual event rather than a live stage show. Guests include Jason Benetti, Catie Lazarus, Ellis Paul, Rebecca Loebe and Jen Kirkman. Over $160,000 was raised.

In 2024, it was announced that year's edition of Pardcast-A-Thon would be the final edition of the telethon.

Over the course of 11 Pardcast-A-Thons they have raised over $1.3 million for Smile Train.

== Awards ==
- Never Not Funny was the winner a 2008 Rooftop Comedy Award for best Comedy podcast.
- Never Not Funny was nominated for a 2007 Podcast Award in the Comedy category.
- Never Not Funny was nominated for a 2006 Weblog Award.
- Never Not Funny was made one of iTunes' "Best in 2006" and "Best in 2007" podcasts.

== Guests/Episodes ==
Guests pulled from NeverNotFunny.com.

Guest	Episode #
Aaron Bleyaert	14L
Aaron Lee	3833
Ace Frehley	2308
Adam Carolla	507, PCAT 11
Adam Cayton-Holland	2304, 26W
Adam Chester	31R
Adam Conover	38GG
Adam Felber	33O
Adam Ferrara	1108, 1413, 1520, 23V, 2509, 27F, 3015
Adam Pally	1702
Adam Ray	1807, 20K
Adam Scott	808, 1402, PCAT 14
Ahmed Best	PCAT 19
Ahmed Bharoocha	32P
Ahmet Zappa	3405
Aimee Mann	PCAT 10
Aisha Tyler	919
Al Jackson	1318, 14V, 1715, 20F, PCAT 18
Al Madrigal	701, 902, 2016, 2802
Al Romas	27C
Alex Alexander	30E, 32D
Alfred Molina	2322
Alice Hamilton	3208
Alison Leiby	27M
Alison Rosen	1606, PCAT 16, 21U, PCAT 18, 25C, 26I, 28R, 3225, 36K, 3722, NNF 20TH
Allan Havey	806, PCAT 14, 23M, 3716
Allie Mac Kay	2718, 2825
Alonzo Bodden	31G
Alyssa Sabo	3407, PCAT 24
Amanda Lehan-Canto	3415
Amber Rose	1823
Amy Landecker	3810
Amy Poehler	PCAT 11
Anastasia Jacques	3804
Andrea Allan	24R
Andrea Savage	2021, 2405, PCAT 19, 2502, 2604, 26P, 2823, 3116, 3402
Andres Parada	3508
Andrew Orolfo	35H
Andy Daly	302, 421, 624, 805, 1201, 1405, 1602, 1625, PCAT 16, 1910, PCAT 17, PCAT 18, 2214, 2303, 2401, PCAT 19, 2608, 2618, 2921, 3101, 33I, 3517, 36U, 3803, NNF 20TH, 3832
Andy Erikson	31B
Andy Kindler	220, 703, 913, 1125, 26L, 34D
Andy Lassner	2422
Andy Peters	15P
Andy Richter	410, 622, PCAT 10, 821, PCAT 11, PCAT 13, PCAT 17, 3102, PCAT 24
Andy Wood	34L
Andy Woodhull	38II
Angela Kinsey	PCAT 17
Anna Hughes	3512
Annabelle Gurwitch	2009, 27J
Annie Sertich	33F, 3816
Anthony Jeselnik	1619
Anthony Rapp	1621, 1720, PCAT 16, 1913, 20U, 2206
Aparna Nancherla	18S
April Richardson	14M, 15O, 16Y, 18C, PCAT 16, 19J, 20R, 21N, PCAT 18, 22F, 22Q, 2312, 26U, VITELLO’S, 3023, 33M
Ashleigh Hairston	29L, 34J
Auggie Smith	36W
Austin Williams	36C
Autumn Bruewer	35O
Avra Friedman	32G
Baron Vaughn	2620
Ben Cumings	38D
Ben Gleib	1506
Ben Schwartz	1309, 1502, PCAT 14, PCAT 16, 2609
Ben Wexler	32202
Bess Kalb	2812
Beth Appel	38AA
Beth Stelling	3202, 3725
Betsy Brandt	2412
Betsy Sodaro	28K
Betsy Stover	26V, 29F, 31D, 33A, 37O
Bil Dwyer	148, 317, 422, 601, PCAT 11, 1011, 15A, 19L, 27D
Bill Leff	CHICAGO, 22N, 2805
Billy Eichner	1510, PCAT 14
Billy Gardell	3802
Blaine Capatch	2903, 30L, 3522
Blair Socci	3323
Bob Kevoian	22Z
Bob Odenkirk	PCAT 13
Bob Saget	PCAT 12, 1418
Bob Zany	1208
Bobby Moynihan	2504, 3006
Bobby Rice	38JJ
Brad Gage	23G
Brad Morris	2518
Brandie Posey	19N, 20N, 22S, 27K, 32W
Brendan Smith	25Q, 30C, 32V, 35B, 37A
Brendon Walsh	17K
Bret Hart	TORONTO
Brian Huskey	1914
Brian Kiley	27S, 31W, 35A
Brian Noonan	18N, ROSEMONT
Brian Posehn	3117
Brian Regan	2320, 2803
Brian Scolaro	15Y
Bridger Winegar	3221
Brody Stevens	PCAT 09
Brooks Wheelan	15E, 29C
Bryan Cook	3606, 3834
Budd Friedman	PCAT 13
Caissie St. Onge	2315, 24T, 30P, 36O
Caitlin Frain	36F
Caitlin Peluffo	3820
Cameron Buchholtz	ISO FILES 60
Carl Tart	2717, 3004, PCAT 24
Carla Cackowski	17Z
Carole Montgomery	23J
Carolyn Hennesy	PCAT 13
Carrie Clifford	26B, 31I
Cathy Ladman	236, 416, 17A, 20J, 21J, 22O, 25I, 27T, 2923, 32B, NNF 20TH
Catie Lazarus	22I, 22Y, 24H, 26J/2719, PCAT 20
CeCe Pleasants	17B, 1824, PCAT 17, 21O, PCAT 18, 23D, PCAT 19, 25P, 26M, 28T, 3118, 33D, PCAT 24
Cedric Yarbrough	2409, PCAT 19
Chad Daniels	20I, 24J, 2421
Charlie McCrackin	3505
Chelsey Crisp	1813, PCAT 17, 3616
Cheryl Hines	2815
Chick McGee	BLOOMINGTON12, 19Z
Chip Chinery	PCAT 12, 17S, 31O
Chip Pope	17C
Chloe Radcliffe	38E
Chris Elliott	2318
Chris Fairbanks	228, 406, 510, 625, 1007, 1213, 14W, PCAT 14, 18B, 2306, 25G, 2711, 34A
Chris Gethard	28P
Chris Grace	27H, 28W, 31H, 32S, 3421, 35M, 37P, 3836
Chris Hardwick	224, 310, 502, PCAT 09, 1324, PCAT 14
Chris Mancini	14D, 30J
Chris Porter	32J
Chris Regan	22T, 24S, 26D, 29D, 31M, 32U, 3814
Chris Witaske	3306, 36M
Christian Finnegan	BRIDGETOWN, 1225, 22E, 2501, 26G
Christine Blackburn	24W, 26S, 31P
Christopher Titus	3021
Christy Stratton	1713
Cole Stratton	2317
Colin Hanks	2217
Colin Hay	PCAT 12, PCAT 19
Colt Cabana	3206
Colton Dunn	2701
Conan O'Brien	608, 811, PCAT 12, PCAT 14, PCAT 18, PCAT 19
Constance Zimmer	23W, PCAT 19, 25K
Cooper Barnes	32M
Costaki Economopoulos	1122, 24G, 27W
Courtney Revolution	37B
Craig Bierko	802, 1013, 1404, 2220, PCAT 20
Craig Ferguson	2519
Cristela Alonzo	1617, 1725, PCAT 16, 2001, PCAT 18, 2207, 2510, PCAT 20, 2723, 3106, 3401, PCAT 24, 3707, NNF 20TH
Dag Juhlin	ZANIES, 38A
Damien Fahey	910
Dan Cronin	1221
Dan Katz	14H
Dan Kaufman	PCAT 09
Dan O’Connor	34U
Dan Telfer	18T, 34O
Daniel Kibblesmith	3709
Daniel Van Kirk	PCAT 17, 21Q, 25O, 34R
Dana Gould	1006
Dana Schwartz	26Y
Danielle Fishel	PCAT 10
Danielle Koenig	132, 155, 205, 211, 226, 230, 239, 308, 412, 425, 522, PCAT 09, 725, PCAT 10, 912, PCAT 11, 1014, PCAT 12, 1308, PCAT 13, 14F, PODFEST 14, PCAT 14, 16H, 17O, PCAT 16, 19D, PCAT 17, 2113, PCAT 18, PCAT 19, 25R, ISO FILES 7, PCAT 20, 2907, 2911, 3022, 30V, 3204, PCAT 24, 3420, 35D, 3705, NNF 20TH
Danny Bevins	27X
Danny Zuker	2210
D'Arcy Carden	2402, PCAT 19
Dave Anthony	901, 1111
Dave Attell	1415
Dave Foley	SKETCHFEST 10
Dave Hill	16S
Dave Holmes	222, 225, 233, 301, 314, 401, 414, 512, 617, 726, PCAT 10, PCAT 11, 1002, 1113, PCAT 12, 1317, PCAT 13, 14A, 15K, PCAT 14, 15Z, 1618, 1718, PCAT 16, 1814, PCAT 17, 2101, PCAT 18, PCAT 19, 26C, 2909, 3218, PCAT 24, 3418, NNF 20TH, 38EE
Dave Shumka	19C
David Feldman	1903
David Foster	PCAT 24
David Huntsberger	15D
David Koechner	SKETCHFEST 11
David and Leeman	PCAT 14
David Park	16B
David Steinberg	1724
David Wild	1822, 2906
DeAnne Smith	2310, 26Q, 32K, 34K
Deborah Baker Jr.	36V
Debra DiGiovanni	2213
Demi Adejuyigbe	21F, PCAT 18, 2309
Denise Winkelman	36Y
Dennis Christopher	PCAT 24
Diane Franklin	2007
Diedrich Bader	1817
Doug Benson	232, 305, 407, 516, PCAT 10, 1023, PCAT 12, PCAT 13, 1511, PCAT 14, PCAT 16, PCAT 18, 2714, 3125, 3503, 37W
Doug Jones	3207
Drew Lynch	3625
Dusty Slay	2415
Dwayne Perkins	1012
Ed Begley Jr.	3310
Ed Crasnick	917, 28H
Eddie Pepitone	1508, 3712
Eddie Trunk	816
Edi Patterson	3621
Edy Modica	38T
Eli Braden	PCAT 11
Eliza Skinner	1705, 2012, 21Y, 27A
Ellis Paul	810, ATLANTA, 1513, PCAT 14, 1801, 2212, 2414, PCAT 20, 3313
Emily Fleming	2922, 3603
Emily Heller	2408
Eric Andre	2616
Eric Calver	NNF 20TH
Erica Rhodes	23B
Erin Foley	1518, 16N, PCAT 17, 2115, 2721, 3114
Erin Jackson	2804
Erin Maguire	37X
Erinn Hayes	2522
Eva Anderson	31F
Fahim Anwar	2314
Fielding Edlow	2915, 33S
Florence Henderson	SKETCHFEST 12
Fortune Feimster	3520
Francisco Ramos	3824
Frankie Quiñones	3708
Fred Stoller	1219, 14R, 2011
Fred Willard	PCAT 14
Fritz Coleman	3413, 38KK
Garry Meier	CHICAGO
Gary Brightwell	15N
Gary Cannon	21Z
Gary Greenberg	3701
Gary Gulman	1009, 1512, 1918, 2325, 2619, PCAT 20, 3018, 30R, 3320
Gary Lucy	923, 14Q, 20Z
Gene “Bean” Baxter	2716
Geoff Tate	18K, 19Q, 21S, 23Q, 30K
Grace Parra	1818
Graham Elwood	116, 203, 207, 237, 319, 418, 521, 616, PCAT 10, 814, PCAT 11, 1101, 1311, PCAT 14, 1605, 19F
Greg Behrendt	318, 603, PCAT09, 702, BUMBERSHOOT, PCAT 10, 825, PCAT 11, PCAT 12, 1202, PCAT 13, 1409, PCAT 14, 16T, PCAT 16, 2002, PCAT 17, PCAT 19, 30T, 3410
Greg Fitzsimmons	505, 1116, 1806, 25X, 3809
Greg Proops	709, 1315, 3423, 3715, 38O
Greg Warren	15M, 26R, 3214, 3613
Grey DeLisle	2910
Griffin Kelly	3825
Guy Branum	1610
Hal Rudnick	34E
Halle Kiefer	27O
Hallelujah the Hills	23T
Hannah Einbinder	2902
Harland Williams	1001, 1207
Hay Beacon	3828
Heather Brooker	32O
Helen Hong	25W, 30Q
Helen Keaney	28B
Henry Phillips	20C
Hillary Anne Matthews	35F
Holly Brown	3838
Holly Knight	3119
Horatio Sanz	1711
Howard Kremer	1218, 18X
Hugh Fink	1021, PCAT 12, 37V
Isaac Hirsch	3607
J.B. Ball	36G
J. Elvis Weinstein	3821
J. Keith van Straaten	16R, 21R, 2808, 30A, 31Y, 34F, 35V, 3719, 38W
Jack McBrayer	PCAT 13
Jack Wagner	PCAT 13
Jackie Kashian	718, 15G, 18M, 2219, PCAT 19, 27P, 2914, 35W, 3721
Jade Catta-Preta	3109
Jae Suh Park	PCAT 17
Jake Fogelnest	1719
Jake Johannsen	1316
Jameela Jamil	2305
James Pankow	2813
James Urbaniak	1701, 2905
Jamie Alcroft	38N
Jamie Denbo	17J
Jamie Kaler	1904
Jamie Lee	1901, 2120
Janet Varney	419, 506, VANCOUVER, PCAT 09, 708, 824, PCAT 11, 1019, 1314, PCAT 13, 1614, PCAT 16, 19B, 2105, PCAT 18, PCAT 19, 2612, 2821, 3120, 33Z, PCAT 24, 3717
Jann Karam	33E
Jared Logan	33H
Jason Benetti	2224, 2624, PCAT 20, 3019, 32Q
Jason Berlin	3813
Jason Mantzoukas	1517
Jason Nash	14U, 1611
Jason Pardo	16M
Jason Scheff	NNF 20TH
Jason Thompson	1503, PCAT 14
Jay Chandrasekhar	3215
Jay Mohr	2014, 2417
Jean Villepique	3017
Jeff Babko	23I, PCAT 19, 25U, 29I, 3210, PCAT 24, 3515, 3711
Jeff Cesario	18P
Jeff Dye	2123
Jen Kirkman	409, 515, 622, PCAT 10, 807, PCAT 12, 1301, 1603, 1723, 2006, 2204, 2407, PCAT 19, 2514, VITELLO’S, 2615, PCAT 20, 2817
Jen Kober	3501
Jenn Welch	28D
Jennifer Bartels	1818
Jere Burns	1810
Jesse Thorn	503, 607, 707, PCAT 10, 920, PCAT 11, 1217, PCAT 13, 1417, 19W, 25E, 29N, 37K, NNF 20TH
Jessica Chaffin	19X
Jessica McKenna	2507, 27G
Jessica St. Clair	1419
Jill Kushner	17W
Jill Whelan	PCAT 13
Jillian Bell	3111, 36P, 3703
Jim O'Heir	20Q
Jim Wise	38U
Jimmy Dore	144, 220, 316, 423, 605, PCAT 09, 711, 1003, 1319, 15R
Jo McGinley	3523
Jodie Sweetin	3220
Joe DeRosa	1507, 17V
Joe Kwaczala	24I, 25L, 27Y, 30D, 31A, 3304, 36J
Joe Lo Truglio	618, 823, PCAT 11, 1401, 16F, 3124
Joe Mantegna	1919
Joe Wagner	16K
Joe Wengert	3811
Joel Stein	1220, PCAT 13, 2513, 33K
John Butler	16G, 1820, 21I
John DiMaggio	2404
John Heffron	221, 22L
John Henson	3209
John Mulaney	1114
John Quaintance	22H, 3601
John Ross Bowie	916, PCAT 11, 1211, 1403, 14N, PCAT 14, 1524, 1703, 17Z, PCAT 16, 19M, PCAT 17, PCAT 18, 2211, 23Z, PCAT 19, 2722, 3020, 31Q, 33G, PCAT 24, 3622, NNF 20TH
John Roy	32N
Johnny Pemberton	3324, 36T, 3830
Jon Cryer	1812, PCAT 17, PCAT 24
Jon Dore	1205
Jon Gabrus	3024
Jon Hamm	403, SKETCHFEST 09, PCAT 09, 721, 820, PCAT 11, PCAT 12, 1320, PCAT 13, PCAT 14, 1525, 1708, SKETCHFEST 16, PCAT 16, PCAT 17, PCAT 18, PCAT 19, 2611, PCAT 20, 3012, 3305, NNF 20TH
Jon Schabl	22C, 24M, 30G
Jonah Ray	1105, 2720
Jonathan Katz	1123
Jordan Brady	15F, 20J
Jordan Morris	PCAT 09, 613, 16W, 28V, 3801
Jose Arroyo	30B
Joseph Limbaugh	37S
Josh Comers	1307
Josh Day	38G
Josh Gondelman	17F, 1907, 2119, 24K, SKETCHFEST 20, 2810, 3620
Josh Johnson	2703
Judy Gold	1303
Julia Hladkowicz	38L
Julian McCullough	1112, 17L, 20V, 25B
Justin Martindale	36B
Justin Willman	PCAT 16, 1805, 2302, 3618
Justine Marino	3202
Juston McKinney	35T
Kaba Hues	38BB
Kacey Spivey	31C
Kailynn West	20O
Kaitlin Olson	3113
Kara Klenk	33N
Karen Kilgariff	14S, 1716, 18I, 20B, PCAT 18, 2623
Karen Rontowski	19I, 21G
Kari Coleman	30Z
Kat Corbett	37R
Kate Casey	2913
Kate Flannery	1609
Katy Fullan	29G
Kathleen Wilhoite	PCAT 14
Keith and The Girl	1109, 15H
Keith Stubbs	1215, 18W, 19S
Ken Levine	2025
Ken Marino	909
Ken Robinson	PCAT 18, PCAT 19, NNF 20TH
Kevin Bigley	1607, 17X, 24Y, 26N, ISO FILES 14, 29A, 3005, 3314, 3511
Kevin Cronin	2617
Kevin Heffernan	38V
Kevin Meaney	NYC
Kevin Nealon	PCAT 12, PCAT 14, PCAT 18, 2505
Kevin Pereira	1008
Kevin Pollak	716, PCAT 10, PCAT 12, 3507
Kevin Ryder	2916
Kevin Seccia	3827
Kimberly Clark	2725
Kimmy Gatewood	2907
Kira Soltanovich	15I, 15X, 1815, PCAT 17, 21B, 24E, 26O
Kirk Fox	38R
Kirsten Vangsness	2419, 2908
Kliph Nesteroff	3321
Kristen Studard	28I, 3013
Kristine Kimmel	29H, 31E, 3301, 35K, 3614
Kulap Vilaysack	1505, 16E, 1804, 2020, 23R, PCAT 19, PCAT 20, 2712, 3009, 33X
Kumail Nanjiani	1312, 1616, PCAT 17
Kurt Long	19H, 22M, 27Q
Kyle Anderson	1808, 21C, 2423, 27E, 29S
Kyle Secor	3518
Lance Barber	3516
Laraine Newman	PCAT 12, 2809
Larry Miller	1704
Laura House	1118, 14G, 21D, 27L, 3409
Laura Ortiz	36I
Lauren Ash	1410, PCAT 14, 1622, PCAT 16, 1920, PCAT 17, 2313, 2607, 2822, 3217, PCAT 24, 3826
Lauren Lapkus	1615
Laurie Kilmartin	621, 818, 1412, 15C, 17P, 1902, 19R, PCAT 18, 2904, 33W, 3806
Leah Krinsky	2208
Leah Rudick	31X, 3617
Lee Farber	2103, 28J
Lennon Parham	1419, 3316
Lenny Schmidt	17I, 33C
Leslie Liao	34B
Lewis Black	2710
Lily Sullivan	3016
Lisa Joyner	38Z
Lisa Loeb	PCAT 11, 19O
Lizz Winstead	32A, 3412
Londale Theus Jr.	3506
Lyric Lewis	2411
Macey Isaacs	37U
Maddy Kelly	38CC
Marc Cherry	2215
Marc Maron	610, 2606
Marc Summers	2111
Maria Bamford	208, 234, 401, MAXFUN 09, 526, PCAT 09, 907, 1121, 1501, 1819, 25Z, 2702, 3222
Mark Malkoff	3710
Mark Volman	517
Martha Kelly	3025
Mary Gallagher	28N, 34V
Mary Holland	2811
Mary Houlihan	3713
Matt Apodaca	30Y
Matt Besser	622, 1514, 2109
Matt Braunger	513, 719, 1103, 1408, PCAT 14, 2102, 2603
Matt Donaher	19A, 21H, 22D, 22V, 23P, PCAT 19, 2424, 25Y, 28Q, 29T, 3103, 32F, PCAT 24, 34Y, 34Z, 36Z, 38Y
Matt Fulchiron	37Q, 3829
Matt Gourley	15J, 16I, 20A
Matt Iseman	1923
Matt Koff	3807
Matt Knudsen	3325, 36R
Matt Mira	17D
Matt O’Brien	3812
Matt Oswalt	1721
Matt Price	14X, 28A
Matt Walsh	313, 415, 518, 1015, 1216, PCAT 13, 1411, 1608, 1714, PCAT 16, PCAT 18, PCAT 19, 3524
Matt Weinhold	16C, 19V, 30F, 38F
Matthew Patrick Davis	3110
May Darmon	38I
Maz Jobrani	2017
Megan Gailey	32L
Meredith Casey	34H
Micah Sherman	1310
Michael Burger	2316
Michael Carbonaro	2319
Michael Koman	1010
Michael Kosta	17G, 20E
Michael Sheen	PCAT 16
Michaela Watkins	2122
Michelle Biloon	20X, 24V, 25N, 26X, 30U
Mike Birbiglia	2515
Mike Drucker	3611
Mike Henry	15V, 19P, 21L, PCAT 18, PCAT 19, 24O, 31N, PCAT 24, NNF 20TH
Mike McShane	PCAT 16
Mike Rock	30N, 33Y
Mike Schmidt	623, 722, PCAT 10, 925, 1018, PCAT 12, 1222, PCAT 13, 14C, PCAT 14, 16F, 1915, 20H, 21M, PCAT 18, 22W, 24B, 25V, 27V, 3602, NNF 20TH, 3837
Mike Siegel	124, 212, 235, 322, 420, 614, 1005, PCAT 12, 1224, 14K, 16Q, 18A, 1917, 21A, 23A, 24A, PCAT 19, 25F, 27U, 28Y, 31J, 35Q, 3609, NNF 20TH
Mike Sweeney	713, 1110
Mike Toomey	CHICAGO
Milana Vayntrub	2124, PCAT 18, 3411
Mindy Sterling	1911, PCAT 17, 2301, PCAT 19, 2925, 3201, 3308, 37G, 38HH
Missi Pyle	2517
Mitch Silpa	28C, 3014, 34C
Mo Mandel	15S
Monika Smith	30S
Morgan Walsh	38S
Moshe Kasher	921, 1017, 22J
Murray Valeriano	15B, 20S, 28M, 29Q, 3319, 37T
Myq Kaplan	915, 1115, 14P, 2008, 22B, 2610, 3216, 37J
Nate Bargatze	2706
Neil Campbell	PCAT 14
Neil Garguilo	16B
Nell Scovell	2221
Nick Heffelfinger	38M
Nick Kroll	1519
Nick Turner	2503
Nick Vatterott	25S
Nicole Parker	35P
Nicky Urban	28G
Nikki Glaser	1620, 1906, PODFEST 17, 2613, PCAT 20
Nikki Nash	3624
Nug Nahrgang	TORONTO, ISO FILES 32
Oliver Pardo	3219, PCAT 24, 3419, 35N, 3608, 36Q, 37N, NNF 20TH, 3815
Olivia DeLaurentis	29M, 3107, 3504
Olivia Flood-Wylie	3303, 35C
Oscar Nunez	PCAT 09, 1304, 15L, PCAT 18, 2218, 2625, 2920, 3424
Pat Francis	108, 140, 201, 205, 209, 213, 215, 217, 220, 221, 225, 229, 230, 236, 240, 303, 307, 311, 315, 320, 325, 404, 408, 413, 416, 420, 425, 504, 508, 514, 519, 523, 604, PCAT 09, 609, 619, 622, 704, 710, 714, 723, PCAT 10, 804, 817, 906, 922, PCAT 11, 1018, 1026, PCAT 12, 1124, 1214, 1306, PCAT 13, 14E, 14Z, 1515, PCAT 14, 15U, 16F, 16O, 1707, 17R, 17Z, PCAT 16, 1809, 18U, 19T, PCAT 17
Pat McGann	23K, 2622
Patton Oswalt	321, 812, 1313, PCAT 13, PCAT 14, 2209, 3312, PCAT 24
Paul Brittain	16V
Paul Dooley	PCAT 14
Paul F. Tompkins	128, 202, 214, 231, 309, 326, 426, 602, 715, PCAT 10, 926, PCAT 12, 1302, PCAT 13, 1407, PCAT 14, 1521, 1706, PCAT 16, PCAT 17, 2015, 2112, PCAT 18, PCAT 19, 2601, PCAT 20, 2801, 2901, 3211, PCAT 24, 3521, 3723, NNF 20TH
Paul Gilmartin	104, 120, 204, 223, 239, 324, 424, 524, PCAT 09, PCAT 10, 822, PCAT 11, PCAT 12, PCAT 13, 14T, PCAT 14, 17E, PCAT 16, 1909, PCAT 17, 20Y, PCAT 18, 23L, PCAT 19, 25M, 26H, 2806, 29O, 32I, PCAT 24, 37H, NNF 20TH
Paul Goebel	130, PHOENIX
Paul Provenza	1523
Paul Reiser	1119, 1811, 2116, 2511, 3003, 3112, 3416, 3514
Paul Rust	615, PCAT 10, 2106
Paul Scheer	1516, PCAT 16
Paula Poundstone	2311, PCAT 19, 2506, 3002, 3212
Peri Gilpin	PCAT 19
Pete Holmes	803, 1326, 1509
Pete Schwaba	152, 209, 216, 17U, 26K
Phil Hendrie	1107, PCAT 13, PCAT 14
Phil Rosenthal	1709, PCAT 16, 2125, 3404
Preacher Lawson	3404
Priyanka Wali	2917
Quinn Cummings	2010
Rachel Bloom	1922, PCAT 17, 3115
Rachel Dratch	NYC
Rachel Kaplan	22X
Rachel Quaintance	417, 525, PCAT 09, 620, 801, PCAT 10, PCAT 11, 1024, 1210, 1323, 14B, PCAT 14, 16A, 17N, 18R, PCAT 17, 20W, 2202, PCAT 18, 24C, PCAT 19, 26A, 2704, 2924, 3011, 31V, 31Z, 32Y, PCAT 24, 34T, 36A, 38H
Ralph Garman	2201, 37L
Randall Park	PCAT 17
Rashawn Nadine Scott	36E
Rebecca Corry	905, PCAT 11
Rebecca Lee	3008
Rebecca Loebe	18J, 21V, 24P, PCAT 20
Regan Burns	1204, 29R, 31K, 34S, 3706, 3817
Retta Putignano	35I
River Butcher	2420
Rhett and Link	1921, PCAT 17, 2508
Rhett Reese	1813
Rich Sommer	PCAT 09, 612, PCAT 10, 815, PCAT 11, PCAT 12, 1209, PODFEST 13, PCAT 13, 1406, 14O, PCAT 14, 15T, 1601, 16F, 16U, PCAT 16, 1821, 1925, 2108, PCAT 18, 2323, PCAT 19, 2605, ISO FILES 3, 27I, 2912, 3213, PCAT 24, 3519, NNF 20TH
Richard Blade	2406
Richard Kind	1802, PCAT 17, PCAT 20
Richard Lewis	1117
Richard Marx	2524
Richie "LaBamba" Rosenberg	PCAT 10
Riley Silverman	24F
Ritch Shydner	1912
River Butcher	2420
RJ Thieneman	14L
Rob Corddry	312, 402, PCAT 10, 1120, PCAT 12, 1504, PCAT 16
Rob Huebel	2520
Rob Kutner	27B, 32R, 34W
Rob Paravonian	23F
Rob Reiner	2222
Rob Riggle	3311
Romesh Ranganathan	2118
Ron Lynch	20G
Ron Placone	36D, 38K
Rory O'Malley	2104, PCAT 18
Rose Abdoo	3509, NNF 20TH
Ross Kimball	32H
Roz Hernandez	3224
Russ McGarry	903, 17H, 3610
Russell Howard	2013
Ryan Hamilton	3822
Sally Ann Hall	38Q
Sam Richardson	2816
Sam Wiles	35U, 38DD
Samm Levine	520, 1020, PCAT 12
Sandeep Parikh	34Q
Sarah Colonna	1604, 22G, 26F
Sarah Silverman	706, PCAT 10, PCAT 12, PCAT 14, PCAT 16, PCAT 17, PCAT 24
Scott Aukerman	112, 130, 156, 206, 219, 227, 238, 304, 323, 411, 501, PCAT 09, 626, 724, 826, 924, 1022, PCAT 12, 1126, 1226, PCAT 13, 1325, 1414, PCAT 14, 1522, 1623, 1722, PCAT 16, 1825, 1924, PCAT 17, 2024, 21W, PCAT 18, 2225, 23X, 2425, 2525, 2621, PCAT 20, 2724, 2820, 2918, 30W, 3123, 3223, 3322, 3425, 3525, 3623, 3718, NNF 20TH, 3835
Scott Gimple	PCAT 14
Scott Thompson	720, 18G
Sean Cullen	819, 17Q
Sean Jordan	34N
Sean Malin	37E
Sean Ryan	22P, 38P
Sebastian Maniscalco	2622
Seth Morris	1321
Shane Mauss	16L, 19G
Sharon Houston	23S
Shelley Pack	25A
Sierra Katow	34G
Simon Gibson	36X
Simon Helberg	PCAT 12
Sinbad	1421
Siobhan Murphy	2523, 36H
The Sklar Brothers	210, 218, 509, 1425, 2114
Skyler Higley	3818
Sona Movsesian	2709, 3001, 3307, 3704, NNF 20TH
Sophie Buddle	32X, LIMESTONE
Starlee Kine	2814
Stefanie Wilder-Taylor	14J, 33V
Stephen Kearin	30O, 3422, 3513, NNF 20TH
Stephen Merchant	2403
Stephen Tobolowsky	2216
Steve Agee	PCAT 10, 1206
Steve Almond	705
Steve Bluestein	23C
Steve Byrne	2418, 2707
Steve Dahl	1916
Steve Marmel	3406
Steven Weber	1803
Stuart Goldsmith	1908
Sue Kolinsky	28O, 30H
Suli McCullough	2003
Super Dave Osborne	PCAT 13
Susannah Schaefer	16Z
Sydney Heller	29K, 3104, 35G
Tami Sagher	PCAT 10, 1106, 2019
Taylor Goldsmith	2223, PCAT 19, 2715, 3510, 3619
Taylor Williamson	33R, 37I
Terry Carnation	2807
Tess Rafferty	20M, 27N, 29P, 3122, 33P, 3502
Tig Notaro	1004, 1416, PCAT 14, 2117, PCAT 18
Timothy Omundson	PCAT 16
Timothy Simons	1613
T.J. Miller	1612
Todd Barry	1710
Todd Glass	136, 306, 405, 511, 611, 809, 908, 1025, 1322, SKETCHFEST 14, 1420, 16J, PCAT 16, 2121, 2602, 2818, 3121, 33T, PCAT 24, 3702, 38B, NNF 20TH
Todd Levin	606, PCAT 09, 717, PCAT 10, PCAT 11, 1104, PCAT 12, PCAT 13, 1423, PCAT 14, 16D, 1624, PCAT 16, 1905, PCAT 17, 22A, PCAT 18, 23O, PCAT 19, 25J, PCAT 20, 2819, 32C, 38C
Todd Van Allen	TORONTO
Tom Arnold	1016, 2023, 2324
Tom Bergeron	1816, 2018, PCAT 18
Tom Clark	3615
Tom Dreesen	PCAT 10, 2713
Tom Hertz	38X
Tom Papa	2110
Tom Simmons	19Y
Tom Snyder	1123
Tom Thakkar	32Z
Tommy McNamara	33L
Thomas F. Wilson	911
Tommy Johnagin	1102, 1305, 3105
Tommy Shaw	PCAT 16, 2614
Tony Thaxton	PCAT 13, PCAT 14, PCAT 16, 18F, PCAT 17, 20O, PCAT 18, PCAT 19, 24X, 26E, PCAT 20, 28U, 30M, PCAT 24, 35Y, 35Z, 38FF
Trae Crowder	3604
Ty Burrell	712, 914
Vance Gilbert	1422, PCAT 17, 2512, PCAT 20
Vanessa Graddick	2705
Vanessa Ramos	3724
Vince Maranto	25T
Walter Koenig	PCAT 11
Wayne Federman	918, PCAT 11, 1212, PCAT 13, PCAT 14, 15W, 1712, PCAT 16, PCAT 17, 2203, PCAT 18, 23H, PCAT 19, 24N, 28E, 3318, PCAT 24, 37F, NNF 20TH
"Weird Al" Yankovic	1424, PCAT 14
Wendi McLendon-Covey	PCAT 14, 2307
Wendy Liebman	1203, 26T, 3007, 33U, PCAT 24
Wheeler Walker Jr.	2107
Wil Anderson	904
Will Forte	813
Willie Macc	34P
Wink Martindale	PCAT 14
Yakov Smirnoff	2416
Zac Brooks	AUSTIN
Zach Galifianakis	PCAT 12, PCAT 13, PCAT 14, PCAT 18
Zach Kornfeld	2516
Zach Reino	34I
Zainab Johnson	3309
Zoe Friedman	29E, 33B

== The Gang Episodes ==
Episodes without a guest and just feature the core four.

Pulled from NeverNotFunny.com.

Episode #
1223
14I
14Y
15Q
The 500th
16P
16X
16Z
17M
1717
17T
17Y
18D
18E
18H
18L
18O
18Q
18V
18Y
19E
19K
19U
2004
20D
20P
20T
21E
21K
21P
21X
2205
22K
22R
23E
23N
23Y
24D
2410
24Q
25D
25H
2521
The 1000th
27R
27Z
28F
28L
2824
28Z
29B
29J
29S
29U
29V
29W
29X
29Y
29Z
30I
3010
30X
3108
31L
31S
31T
31U
32E
3205
33J
3315
3317
33Q
3408
34M
3417
34X
35J
35L
35R
35S
35X
3605
3612
36L
36N
37C
37D
3714
3720
37Z
3805
38J
3819
3822
3831
38HH
