= Paul F. Tompkins =

American comedian and actor (born 1968)

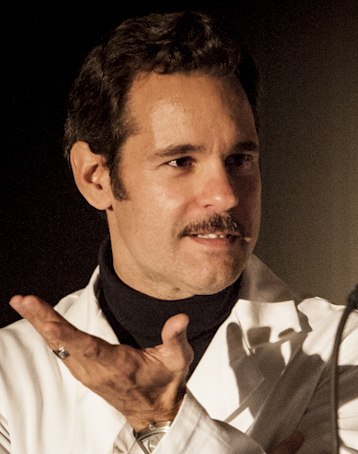
- Tompkins in October 2012
- Born: Paul Francis Tompkins; September 12, 1968 (age 58); Philadelphia, Pennsylvania, U.S.
- Other name: PFT
- Spouse: Janie Haddad (m. 2010)

Comedy career
- Years active: 1986–present
- Medium: Stand-up; film; television
- Genre: Observational comedy

Paul Francis Tompkins (born September 12, 1968) is an American comedian, actor, and writer. He has worked in television on such programs as BoJack Horseman, Mr. Show with Bob and David, Real Time with Bill Maher, and Best Week Ever, later renamed Best Week Ever with Paul F. Tompkins.

He has numerous appearances on podcasts, including his 200-plus appearances on Comedy Bang! Bang! He has been the host of the Fusion Channel talk show No, You Shut Up!, The Dead Authors Podcast, the online Made Man interview series Speakeasy with Paul F. Tompkins, the Earwolf podcast Spontaneanation with Paul F. Tompkins, and The Pod F. Tompkast, which was ranked #1 by Rolling Stone on their list of "The 10 Best Comedy Podcasts of the Moment" in 2011. He is a main cast member of the Superego podcast and was a regular player on Thrilling Adventure Hour podcast, which ended in 2015. He is hosting the podcasts Threedom and The Neighborhood Listen as well as the independent podcast Stay F. Homekins.

Tompkins voiced Mr. Peanutbutter, an anthropomorphic yellow labrador, on the Netflix animated series BoJack Horseman from 2014 to 2020. He has appeared in drama films like There Will Be Blood and The Informant!. In 2021, he had a recurring role on the sitcom Rutherford Falls.

In December 2014, Paste named his Twitter one of "The 75 Best Twitter Accounts of 2014", ranking it at #70.

== Early life and education ==
Tompkins was born on September 12, 1968, in Philadelphia. He is the fifth of six children. He attended Bishop McDevitt High School in Wyncote, Pennsylvania.

== Career ==
=== Early work ===
In 1986, Tompkins first performed comedy at 17 years of age at The Comedy Works in Philadelphia (a club now located in Bristol, Pennsylvania), where he performed as half of a sketch comedy duo with Rick Roman. Tompkins attended Temple University; he dropped out and left for Los Angeles, California, in 1994.

Tompkins met actor Jay Johnston in L.A. through their mutual friend, actor and director Adam McKay. McKay and Tompkins had become friends in Philadelphia, where they had both started to perform stand-up at around the same time. McKay later moved to Chicago and met Johnston; Johnston moved to L.A. at around the same time as Tompkins and McKay introduced the two. Tompkins and Johnston created a live sketch comedy show called "The Skates" that was seen by Bob Odenkirk and David Cross and helped get them hired to work on Mr. Show with Bob and David in 1996.

=== Live comedic performance ===
Tompkins's comedy career has included stand-up, sketch comedy and a variety of other live performances.

Tompkins's stand-up comedy performances are of a storytelling and observationalist style. His shows often consist of extended riffs and long anecdotes. Tompkins deals with topics of the bizarre and the absurd—such as a rant about peanut brittle, a discussion about cake versus pie, and smashed coins—in addition to recounting stories about his own life experiences and family. His comedic style has been described as alternative comedy; Tompkins has stated that he is not bothered by the label and that he likes the term.

Tompkins is known for his style of dress during his live comedic performances, always performing in suit and tie, sometimes in pinstripes and with a bowtie; his look has been described by some in the press as "dapper". Tompkins has described his look as "foppish" and "just this side of Cedric the Entertainer."

Tompkins is based in Los Angeles and performs regularly in the city. Since 2002 he has performed a monthly show called The Paul F. Tompkins Show at Largo, an L.A. nightclub and cabaret. His show has featured such guests as Fiona Apple, Jack Black, Dave Foley, Zach Galifianakis, Ed Helms, Aimee Mann, and Weird Al Yankovic. Since its inception in 2005, Tompkins has taken part in the Thrilling Adventure Hour, a staged production in the style of old-time radio that is also held monthly at Largo. The show began podcasting in January 2011; in October of that same year the show's podcasts moved to the Nerdist Industries podcast network created by Chris Hardwick. Tompkins is a member of the Upright Citizens Brigade Theatre (UCB) Los Angeles. His comedy album Impersonal was recorded live at the UCB Theatre. He also performs monthly at the "Dead Authors" show at UCB Theatre in support of the nonprofit organization 826LA; Tompkins plays the role of H.G. Wells who serves as the host of the show.

Tompkins has toured in the US and Canada and prefers to perform in independent venues, rather than conventional comedy clubs. Starting in 2009 he embarked on his "Tompkins 300" tour. Tompkins had been preparing for his one-hour Comedy Central special You Should Have Told Me at the Laughing Skull Lounge theatre in Atlanta, Georgia—a small theatre that seats about 74 people. In order to fill the seats for the recording of his special, Tompkins required about 280 people in the audience over the course of four nights for the recording of his show. Tompkins decided to announce on Twitter that he needed 300 people to fill the seats each night.

Bob Kerr, a Canadian comedian, saw the Twitter post and asked if Tompkins would like to perform in Toronto. Tompkins advised Kerr that if he was able to get 300 people to state that they would definitely see his show he would come to Toronto. Kerr then started a Facebook group called "I Wanna See Paul F. Tompkins in Toronto" and managed to get 300 people to join. In October of that same year Tompkins performed at The Rivoli night club in Toronto, the same club in which the sketch comedy troupe The Kids in the Hall got their start. Facebook groups were subsequently started in other North American cities and in 2010 he stated that he had stopped promoting his shows on the radio. In 2011 he said that the Facebook 300 groups had become his main method of booking comedy shows.

Tompkins wrote and performed in his one-man show, Driven to Drink, which aired on HBO in 1998. He appeared on 6 episodes of Late Night with Conan O'Brien between 1998 and 2008 as well as two episodes of Conan in 2011 and 2012. He has recorded three comedy albums: Impersonal in 2007, Freak Wharf in 2009, and Laboring Under Delusions in 2012. His stand-up appearances on the Comedy Central network include being featured in episodes of Comedy Central Presents in 2003 and 2007, hosting an episode of Live at Gotham in 2009, performing on John Oliver's New York Stand Up Show in 2010, and recording two original one-hour comedy specials—You Should Have Told Me which aired in 2010 and Paul F. Tompkins: Laboring Under Delusions in 2012. He also appeared in the RiffTrax live broadcast of House on Haunted Hill.

=== Acting and writing ===
Tompkins wrote for and performed on Mr. Show with Bob and David from 1995 to 1998; the show's writers, including Tompkins, were nominated for an Emmy Award in 1998 for "Outstanding Writing for a Variety or Music Program".

Tompkins's work with Mr. Show's creators Bob Odenkirk and David Cross also led to his recurring role on the Tenacious D TV series. Tompkins played the character of a nightclub manager who is duped into reading Tenacious D's ridiculous introductions during their open mic performances. He revived the role in the comedic band's film Tenacious D in The Pick of Destiny released in 2006.

Longtime friend Adam McKay consulted Tompkins regarding the screenplay for Talladega Nights. Tompkins also played the MC of a cat show in McKay's Anchorman: The Legend of Ron Burgundy.

Tompkins has appeared on television programs including NewsRadio, Frasier, Weeds, The Sarah Silverman Program, Pushing Daisies, Community, and Curb Your Enthusiasm. Tompkins played the role of Prescott in Paul Thomas Anderson's film There Will Be Blood (2007); Anderson had previously cast Tompkins in a small role in the 1999 film Magnolia after watching Tompkins perform at Largo. Tompkins also played FBI Agent Anthony D'Angelo in Steven Soderbergh's The Informant! (2009). He has a recurring role in the Canadian TV series The L.A. Complex as a fictionalized version of himself. He also appeared in the music video for Nick Lowe's song "Stoplight Roses" and in the Ted Leo and the Pharmacists song "Bottled In Cork". Tompkins wrote for Real Time with Bill Maher in 2003 and 2009, in addition to being a show correspondent in the show's first season. In 2011 Tompkins was asked to write humorous recaps of American Idol episodes for New York magazine's online blog Vulture.

Tompkins has expressed in interviews that he dislikes writing (particularly writing for others), preferring instead to perform in front of a camera.

=== Voice acting ===
Tompkins has done voice work for many animated television series including Dr. Katz, Professional Therapist, King of the Hill, and Bob's Burgers, in which he voices the recurring character Randy. He lent his voice to a character in an unaired 2007 episode of Aqua Teen Hunger Force titled "Boston" that was supposed to be the premiere episode of the show's fifth season, but it was pulled by Turner Broadcasting System to avoid further controversy surrounding the 2007 Boston bomb scare.

Tompkins later appeared in an episode during the show's 7th season. He was also the voice of one of the thugs in Walt Disney Animation Studios' 2010 animated film Tangled. Tompkins was the voice of Benton Criswell, a character in MTV series Super Adventure Team which featured marionettes in the style of the 1960s British series Thunderbirds; the role was credited under the stage name Francis Mt. Pleasant. He was the voice of a puppet in ads for the Ford Focus.

Tompkins played Mr. Peanutbutter in the 2014 Netflix original animated series BoJack Horseman. Tompkins voices the recurring character Gladstone Gander in the reboot series of DuckTales. In 2020, he voiced Dr. Migleemo, a therapist aboard the USS Cerritos, in the CBS All Access animated series Star Trek: Lower Decks.

=== Political and social commentary ===
Tompkins has appeared on several television programs devoted to discussing politics, popular culture, and current events; however, he says he does not consider himself to be a political comic.

Tompkins was a contributor to the "Us People's Weekly Entertainment" segment of The Daily Show in 1998. In 2003 he was a writer and correspondent for Real Time with Bill Maher in the show's first season and wrote again for the show in 2009. He appeared on Tough Crowd with Colin Quinn in 2004. Also in 2004, he became a pop culture analyst on VH1's Best Week Ever; in 2008, the show was retooled and relaunched as Best Week Ever with Paul F. Tompkins with Tompkins as host. From 2006 to 2008, he was a regular guest on Countdown with Keith Olbermann. In 2008, he appeared on Lewis Black's Root of All Evil and took part in a panel on Larry King Live in an episode titled "Politics & Humor".

Tompkins has appeared in documentaries such as Jamie Kennedy's Heckler (2007) and Doug Benson's Super High Me (2007). He also appeared in The Bitter Buddha (2013), a documentary about the career of actor and comedian Eddie Pepitone.

Tompkins later became the host of a discussion show called No, You Shut Up! by The Jim Henson Company under its Henson Alternative banner.

=== Podcasts, webcasts and radio ===
In 2010, Tompkins launched his podcast called The Pod F. Tompkast. The podcast was a mixture of Tompkins discussing various topics, clips from his live show at Largo, and segments where Tompkins voices a variety of celebrities speaking with one another. Comedian Jen Kirkman was a regular contributor on the show. The podcast ended in 2012.

The Thrilling Adventure Hour comedy show at Largo began podcasting in January 2011; in October of that same year the show's podcasts moved to the Nerdist Industries podcast network created by Chris Hardwick. The show ended in 2015.

Dead Authors, a live show that Tompkins hosts at the UCB Theatre in Los Angeles, also began podcasting in September 2011.

In May 2012, Tompkins started a weekly web series called Speakeasy. Hosted by the Break Media site MadeMan.com, the series features Tompkins interviewing various guests in the entertainment industry, such as Ty Burrell, Nathan Fillion, Zach Galifianakis, Chris Hardwick, Oscar Nunez, Weird Al Yankovic, and Alison Brie. The interviews are conducted as casual conversations between Tompkins and his guests over cocktails at various bars in the L.A. area.

Tompkins has appeared well over 200 times as a guest, and occasionally as a guest host, on Comedy Bang! Bang! (formerly Comedy Death-Ray Radio), a weekly audio podcast hosted by Scott Aukerman, a comedian who also wrote for Mr. Show with Bob and David. The show's format mixes conversation between the host and guests, and usually includes improv games. Some guests play characters or impersonate certain celebrities, usually for the entirety of the episode; Paul F. Tompkins has impersonated celebrities such as rapper Ice-T, composer Andrew Lloyd Webber, and Buddy Valastro from the reality television series Cake Boss (cakeboss.).

In addition to Aukerman's Comedy Bang! Bang!, Tompkins has appeared on the podcasts of other fellow comedians such as WTF with Marc Maron, Jimmy Pardo's Never Not Funny, Jessica Chaffin and Jamie Denbo's Ronna and Beverly podcast, and the Superego podcast with Jeremy Carter, Matt Gourley, and Mark McConville. Tompkins has also been a regular guest on the radio show and podcast The Best Show on WFMU with Tom Scharpling.

In 2015, Tompkins created his own podcast on the Earwolf podcast network called Spontaneanation with Paul F. Tompkins. This podcast is similar to the Pod F. Tompkast; however, Spontaneanation is fully improvised and in-the-moment, as opposed to the Tompkast, which was highly produced. Spontaneanation begins with an improvised monologue, accompanied on piano by Eban Schletter, much like the Pod F. Tompkast. The next segment is an interview with one of Tompkins's famous friends. The final segment is one long improvised story performed by Paul and guest improvisers, based on ideas discussed in the interview segment. The podcast ended in 2019.

Since 2019, Tompkins has co-hosted, with Nicole Parker, The Neighborhood Listen on Stitcher Premium. Along with Tawny Newsome, he also hosts The Pod Directive, the official Star Trek podcast, which launched in September 2020

Since 2018, Paul has co-hosted with Scott Aukerman and Lauren Lapkus the podcast Threedom.

In March 2020, during the COVID-19 pandemic, Tompkins started a weekly podcast with his wife, Janie Haddad Tompkins, called Stay F. Homekins. The first season ran for 41 episodes throughout the rest of 2020, and season two started in January 2021.

== Personal life ==
Tompkins is married to actress Janie Haddad Tompkins, who is best known for voicing the red anthropomorphic cardinal Margaret on Regular Show.

In 2017, Tompkins stated on Twitter that he was once a Catholic, but later went on to become an atheist.

He is a member of the Democratic Socialists of America and helped canvass for Eunisses Hernandez and Hugo Soto-Martinez during the 2022 Los Angeles elections.

== Filmography ==
=== Film ===
Year	Title	Role	Notes
1996	Sham	Sal	Short film
1996	Desert	The Man	Short film
1997	Skins	Little John	Short film
1998	Win a Date	Dylan	Short film
1998	Jack Frost	Audience Member	
1999	Magnolia	Chad, Seduce & Destroy	Voice
2002	Run Ronnie Run!	Safari Guy in TV	
2004	Anchorman: The Legend of Ron Burgundy	Cat Show Competition Host	
2004	Nerd Hunter 3004	The Chief	Short film
2006	Tenacious D in The Pick of Destiny	Open Mic Host	
2006	Tenacious D: Time Fixers	Club Owner	Promotional film
2007	Super High Me	Himself	Documentary
2007	There Will Be Blood	Prescott	
2009	The Informant!	FBI Agent Anthony D'Angelo	
2010	Tangled	Shorty	Voice
2010	Drones	Jafe	Voice
2011	T is for Tantrum	Jerry	Short film
2014	Jason Nash Is Married	Dr. Glen	
2015	The Dramatics: A Comedy	Anton Campbell	
2015	Hell and Back	Annoyed Lost Soul	Voice
2015	Regular Show: The Movie	Gino	Voice
2019	Between Two Ferns: The Movie	Burnt Millipede	
2022	The Bob's Burgers Movie	Short Carnie	Voice
2022	Weird: The Al Yankovic Story	Gallagher	
2024	The Thundermans Return	King Crab	

=== Television ===
Year	Title	Role	Notes
1996–1998	Mr. Show with Bob and David	Various	Featured cast seasons 1–4; also writer
1997	Tenacious D	Paul	5 episodes
1998	The Daily Show	Himself	Contributor
1998	Driven to Drink	Himself	HBO stand-up special
1998	Super Adventure Team	Dr. Benton Criswell (voice)	
1999	NewsRadio	Justice of the Peace	Episode: "Wedding"
1999	Dr. Katz, Professional Therapist	Paul (voice)	Episode: "Vow of Silence"
2000–2001	DAG	Sullivan Pope	Main cast; 16 episodes
2000–2001	Murry Wilson: Rock N Roll Dad	Murry Wilson (voice)	
2003	Comedy Central Presents: Paul F. Tompkins	Himself	
2003	Frasier	Steve	Episode: "The Harassed"
2003	Real Time with Bill Maher	Himself	
2004	Tough Crowd with Colin Quinn	Himself	
2005	King of the Hill	Professor Twilley (voice)	Episode: "A Portrait of the Artist as a Young Clown"
2005	Kelsey Grammer Presents: The Sketch Show	Various	6 episodes
2005	Too Late with Adam Carolla	Himself	
2006–2008	Countdown with Keith Olbermann	Himself	Regular contributor
2007	Comedy Central Presents: Paul F. Tompkins 2	Himself	
2007	The Sarah Silverman Program	Paul / Police Officer No. 1	4 episodes
2007	Weeds	Bob	2 episodes
2008	Best Week Ever	Himself (host)	
2008	Larry King Live	Himself	
2008	Lewis Black's Root of All Evil	Himself	6 episodes
2008	Pushing Daisies	Gunther Pinker	Episode: "Oh Oh Oh... It's Magic"
2010	Aqua Teen Hunger Force	Police Officer / Angel (voice)	2 episodes (1 episode was pulled)
2010	Community	Robert	Episode: "Mixology Certification"
2010	Nick Swardson's Pretend Time	Various	Episode: "I Just Got Voodoo'd"
2010	True Jackson, VP	Royce Bingham	Episode: "True Fear"
2010–2012	Regular Show	Various	5 episodes
2010, 2012	The Life & Times of Tim	Donnie / Kyle Zander (voice)	2 episodes
2011	Curb Your Enthusiasm	Andrew Berg	Episode: "The Divorce"
2011	Raising Hope	Jeff	Episode: "The Cultish Personality"
2011	Last Man Standing	Chester McAllister	Episode: "Last Baby Proof Standing"
2011	Up All Night	Dave	Episode: "Week Off"
2011, 2014	Talking Dead	Himself	2 episodes
2011–2019	Bob's Burgers	Randy / various (voice)	9 episodes
2012	Key & Peele	Congressman	Episode: "Dueling Magical Negroes"
2012	Paul F. Tompkins: Laboring Under Delusions	Himself	Stand-up special
2012	The L.A. Complex	Paul F. Tompkins	6 episodes
2012–2016	Comedy Bang! Bang!	Various	14 episodes
2012–2013	Adventure Time	Various voices	2 episodes
2013	Ghost Ghirls	Antonio	Episode: "Something Borrowed, Something Boo"
2013–2016	No, You Shut Up!	Himself (host)	58 episodes
2013–2017	@midnight	Himself	Recurring contestant; 15 episodes; Tournament of Champions winner
2014–2020	BoJack Horseman	Mr. Peanutbutter / various (voice)	Main cast; 71 episodes
2015	WordGirl	The Royal Dandy / Dr. Clocktormocktor (voice)	Episode: "Royally Framed" / "WordGirl vs. Tobey vs. the Dentist"
2015	The Thundermans	King Crab	Episode: "A Hero Is Born"
2015	Kroll Show	Andy Downpour	Episode: "The Commonwealth Games"
2015	Rick and Morty	Lawyer (voice)	Episode: "A Rickle in Time"
2015	Paul F. Tompkins: Crying and Driving	Himself	Stand-up special
2015	W/ Bob & David	Various	4 episodes; also writer
2015	Drunk History	Himself	Episode: "Las Vegas"
2015	Moonbeam City	Kitch Legstrong (voice)	Episode: "Stuntstravaganza"
2016	Brooklyn Nine-Nine	Captain Orleans	Episode: "The Cruise"
2016	The Late Show with Stephen Colbert	Himself	2 episodes
2016	Great Minds with Dan Harmon	Edgar Allan Poe	Episode: "Edgar Allan Poe"
2016	HarmonQuest	Teflonto	Episode: "The Quest Begins"
2016–2018	The Venture Bros.	Blue Morpho / various (voice)	4 episodes
2016–2018	Take My Wife	Paul	3 episodes
2016–2019	Bajillion Dollar Propertie$	Dean Rosedragon	34 episodes
2017	Adam Ruins Everything	Jenkins	Episode: "Emily Ruins Adam Ruins Everything"
2017	Get Krack!n	Richard Templeman	Episode #1.8
2017	Blindspot	Booky Bentley	Episode: "Adoring Suspect"
2017	Black-ish	Dr. Reagan	Episode: "Sugar Daddy"
2017	Life in Pieces	Richard York	Episode: "Thirty-Five Teacher Escape Lottery"
2017–2018	Speechless	Dane Richmond	2 episodes
2017–2020	Tangled: The Series	Shorty (voice)	42 episodes
2017–2021	DuckTales	Gladstone Gander (voice)	6 episodes
2018	Another Period	Cole Bottoms	Episode: "Shady Acres"
2018–2019	Big City Greens	Justin / various (voice)	2 episodes
2019	You're the Worst	Himself	3 episodes
2019	Nature Cat	Chandler (voice)	Episode: "Magical Mushroom Mystery Tour; A Midsummer Day's Dream"
2019	Talking Tom & Friends	Reece (voice)	Episode: "Supermodel Tom"
2019	Lodge 49	Farrell Higgins	Episode: "Le Reve Impossible"
2019	Star Wars Resistance	Flanx (voice)	Episode: "From Beneath"
2019	Room 104	Louis	Episode: "Crossroads"
2019–2021	American Dad!	Various voices	3 episodes
2019, 2022	Tuca & Bertie	(voice)	2 episodes
2020, 2024–present	Criminal Minds	Brian Garrity	Recurring role
2020	Brockmire	Harold K. Finnegan	Episode: "Union Negotiations"
2020	The Twilight Zone	Jimmy O'Malley	Episode: "Ovation"
2020	Corporate	Agent Roman	Episode: "Good Job"
2020	Aunty Donna's Big Ol' House of Fun	Jukebox	Episode: "Dinner Party"
2020, 2022	Dicktown	Loafer Toeknuckle (voice)	2 episodes
2020–2024	Star Trek: Lower Decks	Dr. Migleemo / various (voice)	14 episodes
2021	Close Enough	The Amazing Sardini (voice)	Episode: "Handy/Birthdaze"
2021	Central Park	(voice)	Episode: "Sir Bricks-a-Lot"
2021	Centaurworld	Tail (voice)	5 episodes
2021	Ada Twist, Scientist	Iggy's Dad (voice)	Episode: "Cake Twist/Garden Party"
2021–2025	Jellystone!	Magilla Gorilla / Fleegle / Jonathan Wellington "Mudsy" Muddlemore (voices)	Main role
2021–2022	Rutherford Falls	Professor Tobias James Kaufman	3 episodes
2021–2023	HouseBroken	Various voices	12 episodes
2021, 2023	Miracle Workers	Snake Oil Salesman / Percy	2 episodes
2021–2024	The Great North	Mr. Golovkin / various (voice)	16 episodes
2022	The Simpsons	Colby Redfield (voice)	Episode: "Meat Is Murder"
2022	Birdgirl	Maître d' (voice)	Episode: "Fli on Your Own Supply"
2022	Lego Star Wars: Summer Vacation	Rad (voice)	Television special
2022	Out of Office	Mr. Donahue	Television film
2022	Storybots: Answer Time	Water Molecule (voice)	Episode: "Ice"
2022	Sherman's Showcase	Senator	Episode: "Murder at the Shrind"
2023	Pantheon	Pilot / Wynn (voice)	Episode: "Crack Integrity"
2023	The Ghost and Molly McGee	Ernie (voice)	Episode: "Welcome to Necrocomic-Con/Fit to Print"
2023	Invincible	Narrator (voice)	Episode: "This Missive, This Machination!"
2024	Clone High	Professor Hirsute (voice)	Episode: "Blinded with Pseudoscience: Magnetic Distractions"
2024	Dirty Laundry	Himself	Episode: "Who Has an Active Warrant Out For Their Arrest?"
2024	Smartypants	Himself	Recurring guest
2024	Monster High	Trick (voice)	Episode: "The Monster Fest, Parts 3 & 4"
2024–2025	After Midnight	Himself	Recurring contestant; 6 episodes
2024, 2026	Make Some Noise	Himself	2 episodes
2025	Your Friendly Neighborhood Spider-Man	Bentley Wittman (voice)	5 episodes
2025	Very Important People	David Hoyle Jr.	Episode: "David Hoyle Jr."
2025	Game Changer	Santa Claus	Episode: "Earnest-est"
2025	Haunted Hotel	Additional voices	Episode: "Welcome to the Undervale"
2025	Crowd Control	Himself	Episode: "Tiny Celebrity"
2025	Gastronauts	Himself	Episode: "I'll Know It When I Taste It"

== Discography ==
- 2007 – Impersonal (CD; released on Aspecialthing Records)
- 2007 – Comedy Death-Ray (Compilation released on Comedy Central Records)
- 2009 – Freak Wharf (CD) (Released on Aspecialthing Records)
- 2010 – Sir, You Have Fooled Me Twice (EP; released on Aspecialthing Records)
- 2010 – You Should Have Told Me (DVD; released on Aspecialthing Records)
- 2012 – Laboring Under Delusions (DVD; released on Comedy Central Records)
- 2012 – Laboring Under Delusions: Live in Brooklyn (CD; released on Aspecialthing Records)
- 2021 – Crying and Driving (DVD and CD; released on Aspecialthing Records)

== Podcast and radio appearances ==
Tompkins is known for his many podcast appearances, as well as hosting a few of his own. He is often referred to as the mayor of podcasts.

Year	Title	Episode(s)	Notes
2006–2007	The Sound of Young America		
2006–2017	Never Not Funny		
2006, 2011–2012	Guys With Feelings	Various	
2007–2011	The Best Show on WFMU with Tom Scharpling		
2008–2009, 2011	Comedy and Everything Else	#14, #37, #68, #85, #86, #127, #128	
2009–2025	Comedy Bang! Bang!	250+ episodes	Guest, guest host
2009, 2011	WTF with Marc Maron	#150	
2009	Kevin Pollak's Chat Show	#41	
2009	Jordan, Jesse Go!		
2009	The TVA Podcast	#163	
2009	KUCI: Naked Comedy		
2009–2012	Am I Right?		
2009–2013	A Bit of a Chat		
2009–2018	Stop Podcasting Yourself	#82, #140, #171, #194, #205, #257, #325, #349, #429, #571, #626, #653, #686	Guest
2010	Host and Guest	#44	
2010	Dave Hill's Podcasting Incident	#13	
2010	Hold Your Applause		
2010–2013	The Pod F. Tompkast	All	Host
2010, 2012	Comedy Film Nerds	#16, #120	
2010–2012, 2014	The David Feldman Show		
2010–2014	Doug Loves Movies		
2010–2014	Sklarbro Country	#17, #195.5	
2010–2020	Superego	Guest: Season 2, episodes 11–12, 14, 16–17; Season 3, episodes 1–2, 4–6, 8–17; Official cast member: Seasons 4–6, all episodes	Guest (2010–2013) / Official cast member (2014–2020)
2010, 2012	The Nerdist Podcast		Guest (2010) / Guest co-host (2012)
2011	The Anytime Show with Dominic Dierkes		
2011	Citizen Radio	#232	
2011	The Moth		
2011	The Apple Sisters	#1	Guest
2011	Professor Blastoff	#28	Guest
2011	Earwolf Challenge	#3.2, #3.3	Judge
2011	The Mental Illness Happy Hour	#34	
2011	Gather Around Me	#65	
2011	Saturn Scene	#2, #3	
2011–2015	The Dead Authors Podcast	All	Host (as H.G. Wells); guest (as Mark Twain)
2011–2015	The Wolf Den	#14, #94	
2011–2015	The Thrilling Adventure Hour		WorkJuice Player
2011–2017	Ronna and Beverly	#2, #42, #95, #116, #158	Guest
2011–2018	How Did This Get Made?	#16, #64, #106, #107, #201	Guest
2011–2019	Who Charted?	#22, #38, #63, #78, #100, #151, #181, #226, #276, #294, #306, #340, #366, #378, #457	Guest
2011, 2014	Totally Laime	#76, #252	Guest
2012	Quit It		
2012	The Adam Carolla Show		
2012	The Fogelnest Files	#2, #53 (best-of)	Guest
2012	Team Coco	#60	Guest
2012	The Long Shot Podcast	#418	
2012	Shortwave with Grant-Lee Phillips	#8	Guest host
2012	You Made It Weird with Pete Holmes		
2012	Paul and Storm Talk About Some Stuff For Five To Ten Minutes (On Average)		
2012, 2018	Yo, Is This Racist?	#16, #976, #986.5, #990	
2012, 2015	International Waters	#8, #52	
2012, 2015	Alison Rosen Is Your New Best Friend		
2012–2013	Pop My Culture		
2012–2013	Dining with Doug and Karen		
2012–2014	The Todd Glass Show		
2012–2014	Wits		
2013–2014	Analyze Phish	#5, #6, #9	Sometime co-host (with Howard Kremer)
2013	Nerdist Writers Panel		
2013	The K Ohle		
2013	Pappy's Flatshare Slamdown	S04E03	Recorded at the Soho Theatre
2013	The Reality Show Show	#18	Guest
2013–2022	Hollywood Handbook	#5, #66, #107, #182, #223, #267, #325, #361, #385, #456	Guest
2013–2017	James Bonding		Guest
2013, 2015	Judge John Hodgman	#103 #228	
2013–2014	Go Bayside!		
2014	U Talkin' U2 To Me?	#9, #16	Guest
2014	The JV Club		Guest
2014	This Week in Marvel		
2014	Slumber Party with Alie & Georgia		
2014	Feliz Navipod		
2014	Baby Geniuses		
2014–2018	The Andy Daly Podcast Pilot Project	#001, #004, #008, #009, #012, #014, #016	Guest
2014–2016	I Was There Too	#1, #33, #50	
2014–2019	improv4humans	#147, #181, #229, #328, #341, #401, #413	
2014–2019	With Special Guest Lauren Lapkus	#1, #33, #58, #104, #138, #152, #164	Guest host
2015–2019	SPONTANEANATION with Paul F. Tompkins	All	Host
2015, 2018	Pistol Shrimps Radio	6/9/15, 5/1/18	Guest Commentator
2015–2023	The Worst Idea of All Time	2.30, 2.31	Guest
2015	A Beautiful Podcast	#24	
2015	WOMP It Up!	#7	As "Mike the Janitor"
2015	The Indoor Kids		
2015	Superego: Forgotten Classics	All	Cast member
2015	Gilmore Guys	5.07 – "You Jump, I Jump, Jack"	Guest
2015	The Dinner Party Download	#323: Olivia Wilde, Elvis Costello, Paul F. Tompkins	Guest
2016	Think Again	#34: A Tiny, Cosmic Threat	Guest
2016	Earwolf Presents	#41	Guest host (as Andrew Lloyd Webber)
2016	Next Level with Chris Tallman	#1	Guest
2016	Hoot Gibson: Vegas Cowboy	#3	Guest
2016–2018	Hard Nation	#3, #54, #104	Guest
2016–2019	Big Grande's Teacher's Lounge	#1, #10, #14, #28, #S9E1, #S9E38	Guest
2017–2019	Throwing Shade	#297, #335, #400, #404, #408, #419	Guest
2017–2022	Off Book: The Improvised Musical	#1, #23, #52, #64, #75, #94, #100, #116, #125, #126.5, #127, #128, #129, #180, #187, #233, #280	Guest
2017-2025	Hello from the Magic Tavern	#2.28, #2.60, #3.31, #3.97, #4.19, #5.47	Guest (as various characters)
2017	How To Be Less Old	#131	Guest
2017	Strictly Business with Derek Contrera	#5	Guest
2017	The Complete Wedding	#5	Guest
2017	Likely Mad as Hell	#4	Guest
2017	Questions For Lennon	#26	Guest
2017	Mission to Zyxx	116: X-Marse in Chimnacia	Guest (as Rip Seeso)
2017–2022	Doughboys	#119, #242, #309, #366	Guest
2018	Three Swings With River Butcher	#10	Guest
2018	Punch Up The Jam	#38	Guest
2018–present	Threedom	All	Co-host
2019	Blank Check with Griffin & David	#203	Guest
2019	Scam Goddess	#1	Guest
2019–present	The Neighborhood Listen	All	Co-host
2020, 2026	Off Menu with Ed Gamble and James Acaster	#51, #359	
2020–2021	Mascots	#1, #26	Guest
2020–present	Stay F. Homekins	All	Co-host
2020–present	Star Trek: The Pod Directive	All	Co-host
2021	Behind the Bastards	"The Rush Limbaugh Episodes", "Synanon: The Drug Rehab Program That Built Its Own Army", "The Nazi Pedophile Cult Leader Who Murdered Santa"	Guest
2021	bigsofttitty.png	#144	Guest
2022	Conan O'Brien Needs a Friend	#178	Guest
2022-2025	Too Scary; Didn't Watch	"JAWS with Paul F. Tompkins", "ABIGAIL with Paul F. Tompkins", "THE RITUAL with Paul F. Tompkins", "CHRISTMAS AT THE CATNIP CAFE (LIVE!) with Paul F. Tompkins", “ONSLAUGHT (LIVE!) with Paul F. Tompkins	Guest
2026	Artists on Artists on Artists on Artists	Eurovision Superstars (with Paul F. Tompkins)	Guest
