= Super High Me =

- Original film poster
- Directed by: Michael Blieden
- Produced by: Alex Campbell
- Starring: Doug Benson
- Cinematography: Brandon Hickman
- Edited by: Alexis Hanawalt
- Distributed by: Red Envelope Entertainment
- Release dates: October 13, 2007 (Woodstock Film Festival); April 20, 2008
- Running time: 94 minutes
- Country: United States
- Language: English

Super High Me is a 2007 documentary film about the effects of smoking cannabis for 30 days. Directed by Michael Blieden, the documentary stars comedian Doug Benson. The documentary's name and its poster are plays on the 2004 documentary Super Size Me.

== Synopsis ==
Super High Me documents Benson avoiding cannabis for a cleansing period and then smoking and otherwise consuming cannabis every day for 30 days in a row. Benson says that Super High Me is "Super Size Me with cannabis instead of McDonald's". The film also includes interviews with marijuana activists, dispensary owners, politicians and patients who are part of the medical cannabis movement. The DVD was released on April 20, 2008.

Benson underwent various tests to gauge his physical and mental health, first during a 30-day period in which he abstained from cannabis use, then during another 30-day period in which he smoked and ingested cannabis every day. Benson's physician concluded that the effects on Benson's health from his use of cannabis were generally inconsequential. The greatest undesirable changes noted were a weight gain of eight pounds during his "high" month and a significant decrease in his ability to do mental mathematics. His sperm count increased, contrary to what might be expected based on medical studies. His overall score on the SAT increased, mainly due to an increased verbal score.

Summary of test results
	Sober Period	High Period
Psychic ESP Test	1/25	7/25
The SAT	980/1600	1030/1600
Mini-Mental Status Review (Normal = 22+)	27/29	24/29
Lung Capacity	92%	89%
Sperm Count (20 million/mL is normal)	21 million/mL	32 million/mL
Weight Change	−2 lbs.	+8 lbs.

At the end of the experiment, Benson expressed surprise that he did not acquire any aversion to the drug after such continual use, something which he had predicted at the beginning.

The end credits contain a dedication to Michelle Benjamin, a friend of the filmmakers who was killed in a traffic accident involving a drunk driver.

== Cast ==
- Alex Campbell
- Brian Unger
- Gary Cohan
- Robert Gore
- Sean Tabibian
- Paul F. Tompkins
- Bob Odenkirk
- Graham Elwood
- Jimmy Dore
- Greg Proops
- Rob Huebel
- Rob Riggle
- Brian Posehn
- Patton Oswalt
- Sarah Silverman
- Arj Barker
- Zach Galifianakis
- Jeff Ross

== Production ==
The star of the film, comedian Doug Benson, said that the conception of the film originated with a joke in his stand-up act, asking, "If there's a movie called Super Size Me about a guy who ate McDonald's every day, why couldn't there be this movie called Super High Me, where I smoke pot every day?" He shared the joke with friend and filmmaker Michael Blieden, who saw potential in producing a film. Producer Alex Campbell wanted to make a film about the burgeoning medical marijuana scene in Los Angeles and ran into Blieden who casually mentioned the Doug Benson project and Campbell seized on it. Six months later the film was in production. Michael Blieden said about the making of the film, "Without Alex the movie would have languished indefinitely." Campbell commented on the film's inception, "I heard the joke and immediately knew it could be a film if Doug was willing to go through with the experiment." When they made the film, Benson ensured that his "antics" were legally tolerated in the state of California. The comedian said of the experience, "It would be difficult for anyone who has obligations to do, so I wouldn't break the law. I didn't operate a motor vehicle for the 30 days of filming. The crew drove me everywhere." The documentary also featured notable cannabis advocates, including Marc Emery, the Canadian "Prince of Pot"; and Dennis Peron, founder of the Cannabis Buyers Club and coauthor of California Proposition 215. The film was reportedly marketed for the same budget as the cost of a two-inch advertisement in The New York Times.

== Reception ==
Super High Me had a regional premiere at the South by Southwest film festival in March 2008, where it screened alongside two other marijuana-focused films, Harold & Kumar Escape from Guantanamo Bay and Humboldt County. The documentary premiered to the public in the widest documentary opening ever, screening at over 1,000 venues on April 20, 2008. The release date was 4/20 in American vernacular, intended to reflect the number 420 in cannabis culture. The film was distributed by Red Envelope Entertainment (a distribution arm of Netflix), B-side, and Screen Media Films in a partnership. The companies arranged for grassroots screening events, where people could sign up on a website to receive a free DVD and have a public screening with a group of any size. The aim of the distribution strategy was to encourage later DVD sales.

Frank Scheck of The Hollywood Reporter thought that the documentary consisted of Benson merely "expanding a bit from his stand-up act to strained results". Scheck wrote, "Super High Me mainly is an excuse for a series of comic riffs from its undeniably amusing subject who apparently is a favorite among the stoner crowd." The critic thought that the examination of the issues of medical cannabis and the conflict between the drug policy of California and the drug policy of the United States was "superficial". Mark Rahner of The Seattle Times wrote, "Benson's [stunt] isn't as much of a revelation [as the one in Super Size Me], and it's more amiable than funny." While Rahner applauded the on-screen graphics as "professional caliber", he found the video footage to be "distractingly poor". Rahner concluded, "In the end, this is a weak advocacy film without much to interest anyone else."

== Legal dispute over sequel ==
In 2014, the film's other producers planned to release a sequel, Super High Me Redux, which would have shown additional footage taken for the film. Benson sued them to stop the film from getting made.
