= Hypocritical Oaf =

Live album by Doug Benson
- Released: August 31, 2010
- Recorded: Acme Comedy Club, Minneapolis, April 20, 2010
- Genre: Comedy
- Length: 49:45
- Label: Comedy Central Records
- Producer: Jack Vaughn Jr.

Doug Benson chronology
Unbalanced Load (2009)	Hypocritical Oaf (2010)

Hypocritical Oaf is the third album by comedian Doug Benson, released by Comedy Central Records as a CD/DVD.

== Track listing ==
=== CD ===
1. "Deets" – 4:36
2. "Peanut Lady" – 2:44
3. "The Track with the Stupid Fart Joke" – 5:22
4. "Breakfast Window" – 3:30
5. "Time to Go Fred Travalena On Your Asses" – 2:51
6. "Weak Back Problems" – 4:04
7. "Pot the Vote" – 2:55
8. "Sitting There In Your Own Filth" – 3:52
9. "Booty / Weedy Text" – 5:15
10. "Follow Me" – 2:56
11. "Too Trunk to Dweet" – 1:58
12. "Big Finish" – 9:42

=== DVD ===
1. "Comedy Central Presents" (2004)
2. "Comedy Central Presents" (2009)

== Reception ==
Professional ratings
Review scores
Source	Rating
Allmusic	3.5/5 stars

Hypocritical Oaf received positive reviews, mostly praised by fans. Allmusic wrote, "the comedian is highly skilled and can work a lot of sex talk and fart jokes into these topics, as if he was a rambling, baked comedy ninja being cheered on by an equally baked audience.

== Charts ==
Chart (2010)	Peak position
U.S. Billboard Comedy Albums	1
