= International Waters (podcast) =

- International Waters logo
- Genre: Comedy, Panel game.
- Language: English

Creative team
- Written by: Sarah Morgan and Riley Silverman

Cast and voices
- Hosted by: Dave Holmes

Production
- Production: Jennifer Marmor, Laura Swisher, Christian Duenas
- Length: About an hour

Publication
- No. of episodes: 95 as of April 6, 2017
- Original release: March 18, 2012
- Provider: Maximum Fun
- Updates: Bimonthly

Related
- Website: https://maximumfun.org/podcasts/troubled-waters/

International Waters was a comedy podcast hosted by Dave Holmes since renamed as Troubled Waters and distributed by the Maximum Fun network. The show pits teams of comedians from the United States and the United Kingdom against each other in a panel game format.

== History ==
The first episode of International Waters was released on March 18, 2012. The show was hosted by public radio producer and Maximum Fun founder Jesse Thorn until September 2013, with guest hosts Jordan Morris and Dave Holmes occasionally filling in. After a break in the show in late 2013, Holmes took over as full-time host on January 15, 2014, with episode 18. In February 2019, the show underwent a format and title change, and became "Troubled Waters," in which two teams, each taking one side of a common disagreement, compete in a trivia contest over "the right to be right."

== Format ==
The podcast features two competing teams of comedians who must answer questions about pop culture to earn points. One team consists of two comedians from the US, and the other team consists of two comedians from the UK (with Canada occasionally used as an alternative competing nation). The opening round consists of questions based on current affairs, followed by a second round in which the American contestants answer questions about a topic from British pop-culture, and vice versa. The host awards points for correct answers and for answers that are "wrong, but funny." The final round, usually worth a game-winning '1 million points', typically asks contestants to construct an argument about or pitch an idea for a chosen topic, with Holmes adjudicating on the funniest or most creative answer.

The show is written by Riley Silverman and John-Luke Roberts and is produced by Jennifer Marmor, Laura Swisher and Christian Duenas.

== Guests ==
International Waters has featured several notable guests, including Fergus Craig, Starlee Kine, Josie Long, Susan Orlean, Paul F. Tompkins, and Janet Varney

== Reception ==
The Daily Dot listed International Waters at #6 on its roundup of the ten best podcasts of 2012. It said of the show, "You may not learn much, but you’ll laugh... a lot." Pete Naughton of The Daily Telegraph put the show on his list of best podcasts in October 2014, saying it "makes for some good (and often strongly worded) transatlantic banter."
