= Unbalanced Load =

Live album by Doug Benson
- Released: August 4, 2009
- Recorded: Punch Line, San Francisco, April 20, 2009
- Genre: Comedy
- Length: 55:13
- Label: Comedy Central Records
- Producer: Jack Vaughn Jr.

Doug Benson chronology
Professional Humoredian (2008)	Unbalanced Load (2009)	Hypocritical Oaf (2010)

Unbalanced Load is the second album by comedian Doug Benson, and his first released by Comedy Central Records

== Track listing ==
1. "My Name Is..." – 2:30
2. "Super High Me" – 4:20
3. "Three Legged Cat" – 2:52
4. "Segues" – 3:08
5. "The Hoover Dam Bit" – 3:05
6. "New Orgasm Noise" – 1:15
7. "I Love Movies" – 6:40
8. "Boo and Hiss" – 3:29
9. "Drinking" – 2:04
10. "Public Restrooms" – 4:50
11. "Mystery" – 4:00
12. "Questions or Comments" – 3:12
13. "How to Deal With a Heckler" – 2:59
14. "Twitter" – 2:15
15. "Best Story Ever" – 8:34

== Reception ==
Professional ratings
Review scores
Source	Rating
Allmusic	3.5/5 stars

David Jeffries of Allmusic wrote, "Much of the material has been in Benson's set for ages, but returning fans will appreciate having these bits documented on a widely available release. No harshed mellows here, just a fine accompaniment for nights filled with snack chips and couch lock. Punchline Magazine placed it in its "The 10 Best Comedy Albums of 2009" at No. 5.

== Charts ==
Chart (2009)	Peak position
U.S. Billboard Comedy Albums	6
