= Doug Benson =

American comedian and TV host (born 1962)

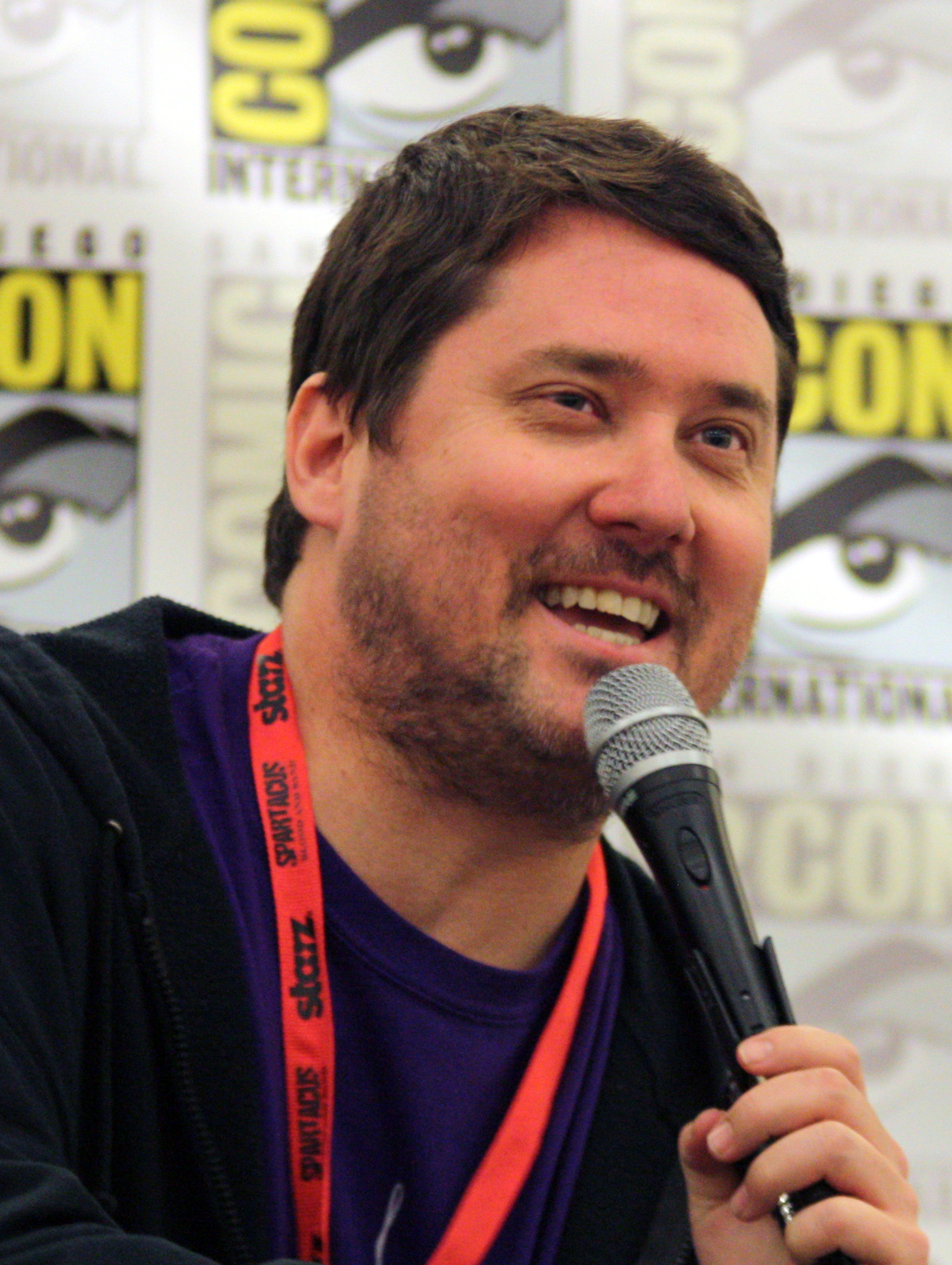
- Benson at the 2009 San Diego Comic-Con
- Born: Douglas Steven Benson; July 2, 1962 (age 64); San Diego, California, U.S.
- Notable work: Best Week Ever; Last Comic Standing; Super High Me; The Benson Interruption; Doug Loves Movies; The High Court with Doug Benson

Comedy career
- Years active: 1986–present
- Medium: Stand-up, television, podcast
- Genres: Satire, observational comedy, alternative comedy, sarcasm
- Subjects: American culture, pop culture, everyday life, self-deprecation, recreational drug use

Douglas Steven Benson (born July 2, 1962) is an American comedian, marijuana rights advocate, television and podcast host, and actor, best known for hosting the podcasts and TV series Doug Loves Movies (2006–present), The Benson Interruption (2010–2013), Getting Doug with High (2013–2019) and The High Court with Doug Benson (2017). As a comedian, he has released 10 comedy albums, starting with Professional Humoredian in 2008, and has regularly appeared on TV shows including Comedy Central Presents, Best Week Ever and @midnight. In 2007, Benson was a contestant on the 5th season of the reality competition show Last Comic Standing.

In 2007, Benson starred in the film Super High Me, a documentary about marijuana usage. He has also acted in small roles in numerous TV shows, including Trailer Park Boys and You're the Worst, as well as several films, including serving as the voice of Bane in The Lego Batman Movie.

== Early life ==
Benson was born and raised in San Diego, California, to parents Wendy (Young), a pharmacy clerk, and Robert Matthew Benson, a former English teacher turned salesman. Doug attended Grossmont High School and was active in the drama department. He also collaborated with a friend on several 8 mm action/thriller short movies during his junior and senior years. After attending Grossmont College, a community college in El Cajon, he moved to Los Angeles to pursue an acting career. Benson was raised Methodist. As a child, Benson struggled with vertigo and poor depth perception as a result of his close-set eyes.

== Career ==
=== Early career ===
While working as a stand-in on numerous movies in the 1980s, he had roles as an extra in films such as Blade Runner, Fast Times at Ridgemont High, About Last Night and a backup dancer in the Disney theme park attraction Captain EO.

While in Los Angeles, Benson began doing stand-up after he and two other friends dared each other to. One of them did not show up, and the other one signed up too late. Benson claimed that "I went in anyway and did my three minutes of whatever I could come with and people actually laughed." At the age of 22, Benson began performing regularly as a stand-up comedian. However, it wasn't until 28 that he became a stoner, after a week's worth of gigs smoking pot afterwards alongside Brian Posehn and Greg Proops.

He made his earliest television appearances as a stand-up in the late 1980s and early 1990s on programs such as Comedy Central's The A-List and Two Drink Minimum and was one of the featured comedians in the cast of Joel Hodgson's sketch-comedy pilot The TV Wheel which aired on Comedy Central in 1995. One of Benson's earliest jobs in television was writing for the MTV game-show Trashed in 1994.

Along with comedian friends Arj Barker and Tony Camin, Benson co-created and performed in the comedy stage-show The Marijuana-Logues. He also hosted High Times ' 6th annual Stony Awards with rapper Redman.

=== Comedy albums ===
Benson appeared on the comedy compilation album Comedy Death-Ray.

On August 4, 2009, Benson's second album, Unbalanced Load, was released by Comedy Central Records. His third album, Hypocritical Oaf was released on August 31, 2010. Benson aims to record a new album every April 20 (with a subsequent summer release date) for as many consecutive years as possible. Benson's fourth album, Potty Mouth, was released on August 29, 2011. The pattern continued with the release of his fifth album, Smug Life, which was released on July 3, 2012, and Gateway Doug, his sixth album, released on July 9, 2013. On July 8, 2014, Doug released a sequel to Gateway Doug entitled Gateway Doug 2: Forced Fun. His latest album release is Promotional Tool which came out on June 9, 2015.

=== Doug Loves Movies podcast ===
In 2006, Benson began hosting a weekly comedy podcast, titled Doug Loves Movies (formerly I Love Movies with Doug Benson), which is recorded in front of a live audience at the Upright Citizens Brigade Theatre in Los Angeles. The show typically tapes weekly, and is later archived on iTunes for fans to listen to for free. Benson and guests talk about movies and comedy both.

A regular feature of the podcast is the Leonard Maltin Game, which has been described as Name That Tune with movies instead of songs. The game consists of Benson reading excerpts from a Leonard Maltin review and guests wagering how many names, read from the bottom of the cast list up, it would take for them to identify the movie.

Other regular features of the podcast include the segments Tweet Relief: Tweets About Movies, Watch This/Not That, Not for Emetophobes and From the Corrections Department, as well as the games Build a Title, Name a Movie, A-B-C-Deez Nuts, How Much Did This Shit Make?, Lincoln or Bane?, Love, Like, Hate, Hate-Like, Doing Lines with Mark Wahlberg, Last Man Stanton, Whose Tagline Is It Anyway, Now Buscemi Now You Don't, Tell The Truth!, Live Die Repeat, Alex and Jason and Deb's IMDB game and F Marry Kill: Movies.

At the conclusion of many of the early podcasts, Doug would state "As always, Willem Dafoe is a Shithead," which resulted in so many people wondering about why, that Google searches began to automatically complete the phrase as a suggested match. The Willem Dafoe comment started as a joke based on the fact that it would seemingly be the only bad words ever uttered about Dafoe, but many people didn't catch on and, after explaining it a few times, Benson decided to let Dafoe rest. Until 2019, the runners up in the Leonard Maltin game are allowed to name one shithead as a consolation prize. Starting in early 2019, Benson now closes the show with "Positive Energy" in honor of his late friend, Brody Stevens

In 2010, Benson started an annual, two-hour Twelve Guests of Christmas special every holiday season. This episode features 12 guests (occasionally more) rather than the usual 3 guests and they play an elimination style Leonard Maltin Game. Scott Aukerman won the first year, while Graham Elwood dominated the next two years in a row. The 2013 champion was podcast fan and Pardcast-A-Thon auction winner, Sean Sakimae. Sakimae also qualified for the next Tournament of Champions for naming the film Titanic in negative names and winning the game. Riki Lindhome beat Jimmy Pardo in the finals of the 2014 edition when Pardo couldn't get the name Lori Singer when going negative three on Footloose. Scott Aukerman bested Sarah Silverman for his second win in 2015.

In addition to Doug Loves Movies, Benson has begun recording The Benson Interruption and releasing it as a monthly podcast for $1.99 and has appeared on numerous other podcasts, including Comedy Bang! Bang!, The Joe Rogan Experience, WTF with Marc Maron, The Adam Carolla Show, Nerdist with Chris Hardwick, Mohr Stories, You Made It Weird with Pete Holmes, Never Not Funny, and Who Charted with Howard Kremer and Kulap Vilaysack.

=== Super High Me ===
In 2008, Benson was the protagonist of the film Super High Me (a play on the name and concept of the film Super Size Me), released on DVD on June 10, 2008. In the movie, Benson compares the results of not smoking any marijuana at all for 30 days versus the effects of smoking as much marijuana as possible for the same amount of time. The film was produced by Red Envelope Entertainment. The results of the experiment were that it had little or no negative effects on Doug's health. In 2014, the film's other producers planned to release a sequel, Super High Me Redux, which would have shown additional footage taken for the film; Doug sued them to stop the film from getting made.

=== The Benson Interruption ===
In 2010, Comedy Central aired The Benson Interruption, hosted by Benson, which ran for one season. The show was based on the live stand-up comedy showcase of the same name that he had hosted in Los Angeles for many years.

The show spun off into a monthly audio-only podcast in 2011, which took the TV show's format and altered it slightly by allowing the performances and conversations to play out in longer unedited episodes.

=== Getting Doug with High ===
From 2013 to 2019, Benson hosted a weekly talk show on YouTube titled Getting Doug with High, which generally aired live every Wednesday at 4:15 PM PST. Benson invited featured guests to recreationally smoke marijuana with him at 4:20. He asked them questions and discussed topics (usually related to marijuana), and at the end of the show, he made them watch a magic trick. Occasionally, the show was done in front of a live audience in Los Angeles, where the performers took turns inhaling from bags of vaporized cannabis.

=== The High Court with Doug Benson ===
Benson starred as the judge on The High Court with Doug Benson, a comedic court show on Comedy Central. During each episode Benson was under the influence of cannabis. All of the cases featured were real and all of his rulings were real and legally binding. The series premiered on February 28, 2017. After hearing the case with his guest bailiff, Judge Doug and the bailiff retired to his chambers where they smoked marijuana while deciding the case. The series was produced by JASH and Propagate Content.

=== Other television work ===
In the mid to late 1990s, Benson had small roles on HBO's Mr. Show with Bob and David, which was co-created by his friend David Cross. He also had small roles on Curb Your Enthusiasm, How I Met Your Mother, The Sarah Silverman Program, Yes, Dear, and Friends.

In 2007, Benson was a contestant on fifth season of the NBC reality show Last Comic Standing. He was voted off the program during the ninth episode, earning him 6th place overall.

In the 2000s, the comedian regularly appeared on the VH1 show Best Week Ever and taped several episodes of Comedy Central Presents.

On December 29, 2009, Benson had a documentary special called The High Road with Doug Benson air on the G4 network. The special followed Benson and comedian Graham Elwood on one of their stand-up comedy tours.

Benson regularly appeared as a panelist/contestant on the Comedy Central game show @midnight, which ran from 2013 to 2017. During the week of January 4–7, 2016, he was featured during a weeklong special titled the "Benson Bowl," featuring many marijuana-related games. Benson ranks first in number of appearances on the show, as well as victories.

== Red Eye incident ==
On March 17, 2009, the host of the Fox News comedy program Red Eye w/ Greg Gutfeld along with Benson as a panelist, joked about Canadian Lieutenant General Andrew Leslie's statement that the Canadian Armed Forces may require a one-year "synchronized break" once Canada's mission in Afghanistan ends in 2011. "Meaning, the Canadian military wants to take a breather to do some yoga, paint landscapes, run on the beach in gorgeous white Capri pants," Gutfeld said. "I didn't even know they were in the war", added Benson, then continued, "I thought that's where you go if you don't want to fight. Go chill in Canada." Gutfeld also said: "Isn't this the perfect time to invade this ridiculous country? They have no army!"

The segment drew wide attention and outrage in Canada after being posted on YouTube following the reported deaths of four Canadian soldiers in Afghanistan three days earlier. Canada, at the time, had been in command of the NATO mission in the Kandahar Province, the birthplace and former Taliban capital, for the past three years. Along with the Helmand Province, the two provinces were "home to some of the fiercest opposition to coalition forces" and reported to "have the highest casualty rates per province."

Canadian Defence Minister Peter MacKay called on Fox to apologize for the satirical comments, describing the remarks as "despicable, hurtful and ignorant." Benson was scheduled to appear in Canada at Edmonton's The Comic Strip April 3–5, 2009, but the shows were canceled after the owner received threats of "bodily injury" toward the American comic. "Some were saying he wouldn't make it from the airport to the club. For everyone's safety, we decided it was best to avoid the scenario altogether," said manager Rick Bronson. Benson offered an apology following the incident on CTV News Power Play with Tom Clark. The comedian stated that he was "ignorant about the situation in Afghanistan" and that the timing of the jokes were "completely out of line". "I honestly said things, in retrospect, I completely regret" said Benson and he has vowed to "never appear on the show again".

== Discography ==
=== Compilation ===
- Comedy Death-Ray (2008)

=== Albums ===
- Professional Humoredian (2008) Aspecialthing Records
- Unbalanced Load (2009) Comedy Central Records
- Hypocritical Oaf (2010) Comedy Central Records
- Potty Mouth (2011) Comedy Central Records
- Smug Life (2012) Comedy Central Records
- Gateway Doug (2013) Aspecialthing Records
- Gateway Doug 2: Forced Fun (2014) Aspecialthing Records
- Promotional Tool (2015) Aspecialthing Records
- Doug Dynasty (2015) Aspecialthing Records
- Lexington, KY 5/7/17 (2017) Aspecialthing Records

== Filmography ==
=== Short films ===
- Captain EO (1986)
- Batman is Just Not That Into You (2017)
- Movie Sound Effects: How Do They Do That? (2017)

=== Films ===
- Return of the Living Dead Part II (1988)
- Run Ronnie Run (2002)
- The Greatest Movie Ever Rolled (2012)
- The Lego Batman Movie (2017)
- Mr. Roosevelt (2017)
- Blood Relatives (2022)
- The Second Coming of John Cooper (2026)

=== Television ===
- Mr. Show with Bob and David (1995–1997)
- Friends (1998)
- Curb Your Enthusiasm (2001)
- The Sarah Silverman Program (2007–2010)
- How I Met Your Mother (2008)
- Bob's Burgers (2013–2017)
- Trailer Park Boys (2016)
- The Jim Gaffigan Show (2016)
- TripTank (2016)
- You're the Worst (2016–2019)
- Crashing (2018)
- Another Period (2018)
- Summer Camp Island (2020)

==== As himself ====
- Cheap Seats (2006)
- Last Comic Standing (2007)
- The High Road with Doug Benson (2009)
- The Benson Interruption (2010)
- Comedy Bang! Bang! (2013)
- The Jeselnik Offensive (2013)
- Star Wars Minute (episodes 81–85) (2013)
- @midnight (2013–2017)
- The High Court with Doug Benson (2017)
- After Midnight (2024)

=== Documentaries ===
- Super High Me (2007)
- Heckler (2007)
- ChronicCon Episode 420 A New Dope (2015)
- The Last Blockbuster (2020)

=== Web series ===
- Yacht Rock (2005)

=== Comedy specials ===
- Doug Dynasty (2014)
