= ID10T with Chris Hardwick =

American interview podcast

I Think You're Overthinking It (formerly ID10T with Chris Hardwick; formerly The Nerdist Podcast)
- Genre: Comedy, entertainment, talk
- Language: English

Cast and voices
- Hosted by: Chris Hardwick

Music
- Opening theme: "Hero of Time" by Fartbarf

Production
- Production: Katie Levine (2010-22)

Publication
- No. of episodes: 1147 (as of June 17, 2025)
- Original release: February 8, 2010; 16 years ago
- Provider: Cadence13 (formerly: Nerdist)

Related
- Website: ID10T Podcast

I Think You're Overthinking It (formerly The Nerdist Podcast, and ID10T with Chris Hardwick) is a weekly podcast "about what it really means to be a nerd" hosted by Chris Hardwick. From its launch in 2010 until 2018, Jonah Ray and Matt Mira were usual co-hosts. As of June 2, 2025, Hardwick is the sole host. After a pause in 2022, the podcast was relaunched in June 2025.

== Format ==
The audio podcasts were typically an hour in length and include conversations with notable comedians or entertainers, sometimes at their own home. Guests typically relate to either stand-up comedy, geek and nerd culture, or both. Occasional "hostful" episodes featured solely Hardwick, Ray and Mira.

== History ==
The show launched February 8, 2010. It served as the flagship podcast for Nerdist Industries, which was founded in 2012 after the success of The Nerdist Podcast. The show's theme song was "Hero of Time" by the analog synthesizer band Fartbarf. Prior to the February 2018 name change, the theme song was "Jetpack Blues, Sunset Hues" by Anamanaguchi.

In 2012 Hardwick sold the Nerdist brand to the Legendary Entertainment, but remained as chief director of Nerdist. Hardwick's contract with Legendary Network ended at the end of 2017, and the podcast separated from Legendary-owned Nerdist Industries; in February 2018, the podcast was re-branded as ID10T with Chris Hardwick and moved to Cadence13. Hardwick changed the name after he moved it to become a part of his own ID10T merchandise and festival company. The podcast itself continued to operate under the same premise, with Hardwick, Mira, and Ray serving as hosts and Katie Levine serving as producer, although by this point other professional commitments had already meant Mira and Ray appeared increasingly infrequently on the show. The phrase ID10T is technical error code for a computer malfunction caused by the human user.

The podcast went on a hiatus in June 2018 after Hardwick was accused of sexual assault and controlling behaviour by ex-partner Chloe Dykstra; Hardwick denied the allegations. Following its return in November 2018, Mira and Ray did not appear on the podcast.

Hardwick published "Hello? Hello? Is this thing on?" the first episode in three years on 3 June 2025, where Chris outlined the reasons for the pod's absence over the past few years. The episode announced a return of the show in June 2025 and a new direction for it. He will be focusing on the concepts of starting new endeavors, hobbies, and other activities in middle age. Parenthood, picking up an instrument, getting out of one's own way, etc. The first episode will be with Ben Schwartz "Improv Master", talking about over-thinking things and how not to do so. The podcast will be renamed "I Think You're Overthinking It". He said several episodes have already been produced and that the episodes will drop every other week.

== Live recordings ==
The first live recording of the show was on April 5, 2010, at the Largo in Los Angeles, with guest Adam Savage of MythBusters, and has since been recorded live a number of other times.

In July 2011 the show was recorded live, at midnight, at the Montreal comedy festival Just for Laughs.

== TV show ==
In 2011 the pilot and a Christmas Eve special aired, with Hardwick, Ray and Mira hosting. BBC America aired six more 'specials' throughout 2012. Beginning with episode 4 the show moved from a half-hour format to an hour.

Season 1
Ep#	Theme	Airdate	Guests
1	Pilot	September 24, 2011	Matt Smith, Craig Ferguson
2	Year In Review	December 24, 2011	Wil Wheaton, Nathan Fillion, David Tennant, "Weird Al" Yankovic, Kumail Nanjiani, Simon Pegg
3	January Special	January 14, 2012	Lily Loveless, Thomas Dolby, Kunal Nayyar, Alison Brie
4	Comic-Con	July 28, 2012	Damon Lindelof, John Barrowman
5	Toys and Games	July 28, 2012	Brooke Leigh Lawson, Gregory Crafts
6	Science	August 4, 2012	Danica McKellar, Cara Santa Maria
7	Nerd Girls	August 11, 2012	Randa Viets, Garfunkel and Oates, Felicia Day, Faith Harrison, Emily V. Gordon, Kumail Nanjiani
8	Time Travel	August 18, 2012	Damon Lindelof, Tom Weston-Jones, Kumail Nanjiani

A 10-episode second season aired in 2013.

Season 2
Ep#	Theme	Airdate	Guests
1	The BBC Extravaganza	March 31, 2013	Matt Smith, Tatiana Maslany, Dominic Monaghan and Matt Kirshen
2	Zombies!	April 6, 2013	Robert Kirkman, Michael Rooker, Karen Gillan and Kyle Kinane
3	Breaking Mad	April 13, 2013	Jon Hamm, Betsy Brandt, and Rory Scovel
4	Fantasy Nerdist	April 20, 2013	Elijah Wood, Ben Schwartz, Kumail Nanjiani, and Katie Crown
5	Wonder Dungeon	April 27, 2013	Joseph Gordon-Levitt, Gillian Jacobs, Paul Scheer and Rob Huebel
6	Tribute To Television	May 4, 2013	Jack McBrayer, Eliza Dushku, and Joe Keckler
7	NASA Nerds	May 11, 2013	Buzz Aldrin, Bobak Ferdowsi, and Maria Bamford
8	Beautiful People	May 18, 2013	Joe Manganiello, Morena Baccarin, and Paul F. Tompkins
9	Tribute to Sci-Fi	May 25, 2013	Guillermo del Toro, Katee Sackhoff, and Ron Funches
10	Superstar Comedian Week	June 1, 2013	Seth Rogen, Evan Goldberg, Zach Galifianakis, and Natasha Leggero

== Reception ==
The podcast was ranked #3 in Rolling Stone's "The 10 Best Comedy Podcasts of the Moment", published April 6, 2011 and #7 in Rolling Stone's "The 10 Best Comedy Podcasts of the Moment", published May 8, 2014.
