= Jonah Ray =

American actor

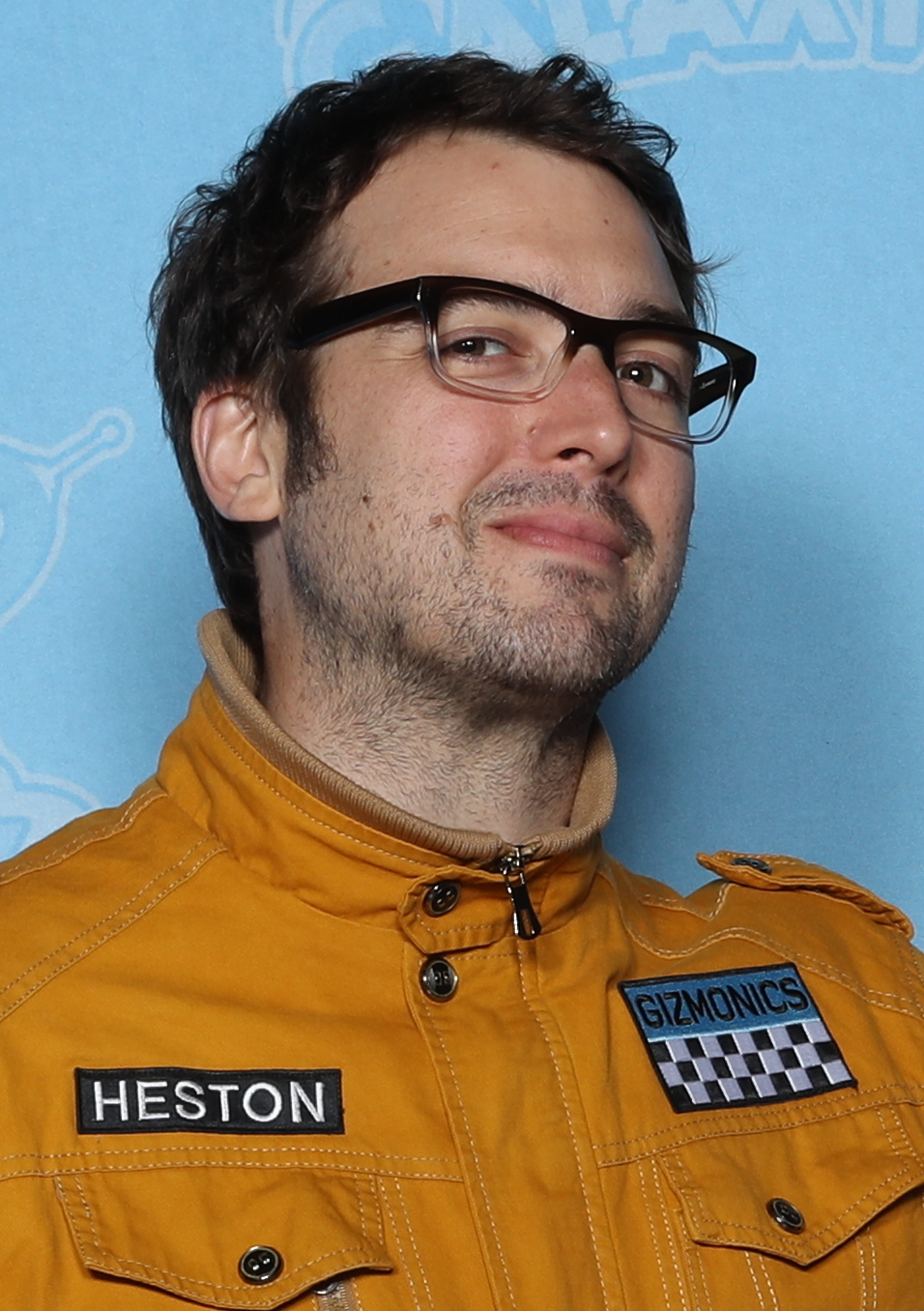
- Ray at GalaxyCon Raleigh in 2019
- Born: Jonah Ray Rodrigues; August 3, 1982 (age 43); Kailua, Hawaii, U.S.
- Occupations: Actor, comedian, writer
- Years active: 2004–present
- Spouse: Deanna Rooney (m. 2013)

Jonah Ray Rodrigues (born August 3, 1982) is an American actor, comedian and writer from Los Angeles. He stars as Jonah Heston, one of the primary hosts of Mystery Science Theater 3000. He is a former host of The Nerdist Podcast and was the co-host of Comedy Central's The Meltdown with Jonah and Kumail.

== Early life ==
Originally from Kailua, Hawaii on the island of Oahu, Ray played in local Hawaii rock/punk bands and later moved to Los Angeles. Once there he first pursued opportunities in punk rock, but later started to focus on writing and performing comedy.

== Career ==
=== Beginnings ===
Ray started his TV career as a writer's assistant for The Andy Milonakis Show, as well as working as a writer and performer on Showtime's sketch comedy pilot The Offensive Show. He is also a frequent sketch and stand-up performer at the Upright Citizens Brigade Theater in Los Angeles and has made appearances on programs such as Saul of the Molemen, Crossballs, The Sarah Silverman Program, and Jimmy Kimmel Live! He also hosted "Joe Genius", an online program about humor and homegrown science, on Revision3. Previously, he worked as a writer and occasional voice actor on Current TV's program SuperNews!. He previously wrote for Web Soup on the G4 network, and then The Soup on E!. He left The Soup in 2012.

=== The Meltdown and Nerdist ===
Ray co-hosted a weekly comedy show called The Meltdown with Kumail Nanjiani, produced by Nanjiani's wife, Emily V. Gordon, at Meltdown Comics in Los Angeles. In late June 2013 Comedy Central announced a television production of the show titled The Meltdown with Jonah and Kumail, which debuted in July 2014. The show ended after three seasons in 2016.

Ray was one of Chris Hardwick's co-hosts of The Nerdist Podcast and television show. In February 2011, Ray revealed on an episode of the podcast that Jonah's Arcade, a video gaming-comedy pilot he created and stars in, was not picked up by Comedy Central. The pilot was later released on YouTube, produced by the same producers of Web Soup.

=== Jonah Raydio: The Podcast ===
In October 2012, Ray began hosting his own podcast Jonah Raydio featuring guests from various independent music scenes. Regular contributors and guests on the show include Man Man, AJJ, Pup, and Har Mar Superstar.

On a 2014 episode of his podcast, Ray announced the launch of his own record label through ATS, Literally Figurative Records, a comedy/music label aimed to feature "a comic on one side and band they are friends with on the other."

Due to the death of co-host Neil Mahoney on August 8, 2021, the show has been on hiatus since with no word on whether it will return.

=== Mystery Science Theater 3000 ===
On November 16, 2015, Mystery Science Theater 3000 creator Joel Hodgson announced plans for Ray to host the series' upcoming continuation. The series was funded through a successful Kickstarter campaign and was released internationally by Netflix on April 14, 2017. Ray plays the character Jonah Heston for seasons 11 and 12. In April and May 2021, Joel Hodgson ran a second successful Kickstarter to produce season 13, in which Ray returned as Jonah Heston.

== Releases ==
Ray recorded a seven-inch record of his stand-up comedy for Aspecialthing Records entitled This Is Crazy Mixed-up Plumbing, released in 2006. He followed this up with his second release entitled Hello, Mr. Magic Plane Person, Hello on May 15, 2012, which received mixed reviews.

Ray had several videos from South by Southwest on comedy website Super Deluxe as well as his own web-series called The Freeloaders Guide to Easy Living with Jonah Ray.

== Appearances ==
- The Sarah Silverman Program
- Saul of the Molemen
- Warner Independent's Mama's Boy
- Comedy Central's Live at Gotham
- Human Giant
- Super Deluxe
- Attack of the Show
- InfoMania
- The Rotten Tomatoes Show
- SuperNews!
- The Andy Milonakis Show
- Master of the Internet
- Walking the Room Episode 62, August 1, 2011
- Conan
- Mystery Science Theater 3000 (Host, Seasons 11 - 13)
- The Nerdist
- The Jeselnik Offensive
- Triptank
- The League
- Drunk History
- Garfunkel and Oates
- Maron
- Hidden America with Jonah Ray
- Talking Dead
- @midnight
- Take My Wife
- Victor Crowley
- I'll Be Around
- Bayside (band) - (Music Video for 'It Don't Exist')
- The Stand Up Sketch Show
- Christmas Bloody Christmas
- Satanic Hispanics

== Personal life ==
Ray married his wife, Deanna Rooney, on April 27, 2013.
