= Between Two Ferns: The Movie =

American comedy film

- Film release poster
- Directed by: Scott Aukerman
- Screenplay by: Scott Aukerman
- Story by: Zach Galifianakis; Scott Aukerman
- Based on: Between Two Ferns with Zach Galifianakis by: Scott Aukerman; B. J. Porter
- Produced by: Caitlin Daley; Mike Farah; Scott Aukerman; Zach Galifianakis
- Starring: Zach Galifianakis; Lauren Lapkus; Ryan Gaul; Jiavani Linayao
- Cinematography: Benjamin Kasulke
- Edited by: Brendan Walsh; Hank Friedmann
- Music by: Alex Wurman
- Production companies: Funny or Die; Billios Productions
- Distributed by: Netflix
- Release date: September 20, 2019
- Running time: 83 minutes
- Country: United States
- Language: English

Between Two Ferns: The Movie is a 2019 American comedy film directed by Scott Aukerman and starring Zach Galifianakis that acts as a spin-off of and conclusion to the web series of the same name. The film was released on September 20, 2019, on Netflix.

== Plot ==
Zach Galifianakis is the host of his public access TV show Between Two Ferns. After Will Ferrell discovered the show and uploaded it to Funny or Die, Zach has become a viral laughing stock, attracting millions of views every day due to his poor direction. During an interview with Matthew McConaughey, Zach accidentally sets off a sprinkler system and causes a water leak which floods the room, drowning Matthew, although he is later resuscitated.

The incident attracts more views than ever, resulting in Will offering Zach to turn ten episodes in two weeks and become president of Funny or Die; Zach, dreaming of having his own talk show, accepts and starts a road trip. Zach bonds with his crew and even though the interviews with guests David Letterman, Paul Rudd, Chrissy Teigen (with whom he has an affair after trying to interview her because Jake Gyllenhaal missed his flight as he misspelled his name on his ticket), John Legend (who sprays him with mace because of the affair), Jon Hamm, Hailee Steinfeld, Awkwafina, Tiffany Haddish, Benedict Cumberbatch, and Tessa Thompson are successful, Zach becomes short of money due to expensive activities. This causes Zach's manager, Carol (Lauren Lapkus) to steal Fabergé eggs from Peter Dinklage during his interview to sell them and buy their return to Los Angeles.

On their way back, Zach gets into a car crash by reading emails while driving, destroying his two beloved ferns. Despite antagonizing his crew, they reconcile and go back to Los Angeles and win the deal. Learning he will get four new ferns, Zach celebrates and starts his new show, Ferns with Zach Galifianakis, and within a month becomes a national success. However, his crew criticizes its lack of charm and personality causing Zach to cancel his talk show and leave with his crew, not before two of his new ferns get destroyed by a car.

== Cast ==
- Zach Galifianakis as himself
- Lauren Lapkus as Carol Hunch
- Ryan Gaul as Cameron "Cam" Campbell
- Jiavani Linayao as "Boom Boom" De Laurentis
- Edi Patterson as Shirl Clarts
- Rekha Shankar as Gaya
- Mary Scheer as Frannie Scheindlin
- Mary Holland as Gerri Plop
- Matt Besser as Mike Burcho
- Phil Hendrie as Bill Yum
- Paul Rust as Eugene Tennyson
- A. D. Miles as Michael
- Blake Clark as Earl Canderton
- Paul F. Tompkins as Burnt Millipede
- Demi Adejuyigbe as DJ Fwap
- Mandell Maughan as Nic Jeffries

=== As themselves ===
- Awkwafina
- Matt Berninger
- Phoebe Bridgers
- Michael Cera
- Chance the Rapper
- John Cho
- Benedict Cumberbatch
- Peter Dinklage
- Will Ferrell
- Gal Gadot
- Tiffany Haddish
- Jon Hamm
- Rashida Jones
- Brie Larson
- John Legend
- David Letterman
- Walter Martin
- Matthew McConaughey
- Keanu Reeves
- Paul Rudd
- Jason Schwartzman
- Adam Scott
- Hailee Steinfeld
- Chrissy Teigen
- Tessa Thompson
- Bruce Willis (archive footage)

== Production ==
On May 23, 2019, Funny or Die announced that it would make a film version of Between Two Ferns with Zach Galifianakis for Netflix. The film was directed by Scott Aukerman, the co-creator of the original series, and produced by Aukerman, Galifianakis, Caitlin Daley and Mike Farah. On June 17, 2019, it was reported that Ryan Gaul, Lauren Lapkus, and Jiavani Linayao were part of the cast alongside Galifianakis.

Several ideas for Between Two Ferns: The Movie that Galifianakis came up with and subsequently discarded early in development were used on his show Baskets.

Aukerman cited several other mockumentary films as inspiration, including This Is Spinal Tap, Borat, and Popstar: Never Stop Never Stopping.

== Release ==
On September 3, 2019, the first trailer for the movie was released.

The film was released on September 20, 2019, on Netflix.

== Reception ==
On Rotten Tomatoes, the film holds an approval rating of 75% based on 60 reviews, with an average rating of 6.6/10. The website's critical consensus reads, "Between Two Ferns: The Movie shows the strain of stretching a series of web shorts to feature length, but should still satisfy fans of the source material." On Metacritic, the film has a weighted average score of 59 out of 100, based on 13 critics, indicating "mixed or average" reviews.

Nick Allen of RogerEbert.com gave the film 3 1/2 out of 4 stars, saying that it "takes what's made the series so extremely funny and lovingly expands it into a feature film, in a way that would make all those ‘90s Saturday Night Live movies envious." Writing for The A.V. Club, William Hughes gave the film a B, praising its humor but with the slightly muted criticism that "some of the original, exciting venom of the show’s appeal ends up a bit diluted along the way".

== Accolades ==
Scott Aukerman, Zach Galifianakis, Mike Farah, Caitlin Daley and Corinne Eckart were nominated for a 2020 Primetime Emmy Award in the category Outstanding Short Form Variety Series for Between Two Ferns with Zach Galifianakis: The Movie, Sorta Uncut Interviews, consisting of uncut interviews from the film featuring David Letterman, Paul Rudd, Awkwafina, Benedict Cumberbatch, Brie Larson, Keanu Reeves, Hailee Steinfeld, and Adam Scott released on the Netflix Is A Joke YouTube channel and FunnyOrDie.com.
