= Primetime Emmy Award for Outstanding Short Form Comedy, Drama or Variety Series =

American TV award

- Awarded for: Outstanding Short Form Comedy, Drama or Variety Series
- Country: United States
- Presented by: Academy of Television Arts & Sciences
- First award: 2011
- Currently held by: Colbert Before Air (2026)
- Website: emmys.com

The Primetime Emmy Award for Outstanding Short Form Comedy, Drama or Variety Series was first awarded at the 63rd Primetime Creative Arts Emmy Awards in 2011 as Outstanding Short-Format Live-Action Entertainment Program. The award was divided in 2016 to recognize Outstanding Short Form Comedy or Drama Series and Outstanding Short Form Variety Series. Starting in 2021, the categories were combined again and renamed Outstanding Short Form Comedy, Drama or Variety Series.

== Winners and nominations ==
indicates the winner

=== 2010s ===
Year	Program	Producers	Network
2011 (63rd)
2011 (63rd)	The Daily Show: Correspondents Explain	Steve Grimes, executive producer; Rachel Maceiras, senior producer; Nick Poppy and Judi Stroh, producers	thedailyshow.com
2011 (63rd)	30 Rock: The Webisodes	Eric Gurian, Bill Sell and Clint Koltveit, producers	NBC.com
2012 (64th)
2012 (64th)	Childrens Hospital	Rob Corddry, Jonathan Stern, David Wain, Keith Crofford and Nick Weidenfeld, executive producers; Rich Rosenthal, co-executive producer	Cartoon Network
2012 (64th)	The Daily Show: Correspondents Explain	Steve Grimes, executive producer; Rachel Maceiras, senior producer; Nick Poppy and Judi Stroh, producers	thedailyshow.com
2012 (64th)	Parks and Recreation: April and Andy's Road Trip	Morgan Sackett, Michael Schur and Dean Holland, producers	NBC.com
2012 (64th)	30 Rock: The Webisodes	Eric Gurian, Bill Sell and Clint Koltveit, producers	NBC.com
2012 (64th)	Web Therapy	Dan Bucatinsky, Lisa Kudrow, Diane Charles and Ron Qurashi, executive producers; Jodi Binstock and David Codron, co-executive producers	lstudio.com
2013 (65th)
2013 (65th)	Childrens Hospital	Rob Corddry, Jonathan Stern, David Wain, Keith Crofford and Nick Weidenfeld, executive producers; Rich Rosenthal, co-executive producer	Cartoon Network
2013 (65th)	Between Two Ferns with Zach Galifianakis	Mike Farah, Scott Aukerman, Zach Galifianakis and B. J. Porter, executive producers; Anna Wenger and Betsy Koch, producers	FunnyOrDie.com
2013 (65th)	Burning Love	Ben Stiller, Stuart Cornfeld, Mike Rosenstein, Ken Marino, Erica Oyama and Jonathan Stern, executive producers	Yahoo.com
2013 (65th)	The Daily Show: Correspondents Explain	Steve Grimes, executive producer; Rachel Maceiras, senior producer; Courtney Powell, producer	thedailyshow.com
2013 (65th)	Super Bowl XLVII Halftime Show Starring Beyoncé	Ricky Kirshner and Steve Bornstein, executive producers; Mark Quenzel, supervising producer; Lawrence Randall, producer; Beyoncé, performer	CBS
2013 (65th)	30 Rock: The Webisodes	Eric Gurian, Tina Fey, Bill Sell, Clint Koltveit and Nick Bernardone, producers	NBC.com
2014 (66th)
2014 (66th)	Between Two Ferns with Zach Galifianakis: President Barack Obama	Mike Farah, Scott Aukerman, Zach Galifianakis and B. J. Porter, executive producers; Sean Boyle and Rachel Goldenberg, producers	FunnyOrDie.com
2014 (66th)	Childrens Hospital	Rob Corddry, Jonathan Stern, David Wain, Keith Crofford and Mike Lazzo, executive producers; Ken Marino, co-executive producer	Adult Swim
2014 (66th)	Parks and Rec in Europe	Morgan Sackett, Michael Schur, Dean Holland and David Hyman, producers	NBC.com
2014 (66th)	The Soup: True Detective	Edward Boyd and K.P. Anderson, executive producers; Joel McHale and Dominic DeLeo, co-executive producers; Hathaway Loftus, supervising producer; Dan Riesser, producer	E!
2014 (66th)	Super Bowl XLVIII Halftime Show Starring Bruno Mars	Ricky Kirshner and Steve Bornstein, executive producers; Rob Paine, supervising producer; Bruno Mars, performer	Fox
2015 (67th)
2015 (67th)	Between Two Ferns with Zach Galifianakis: Brad Pitt	Mike Farah, Scott Aukerman, Zach Galifianakis and B. J. Porter, executive producers; Sean Boyle and Michelle Fox, producers	FunnyOrDie.com
2015 (67th)	Billy on the Street with First Lady Michelle Obama	Billy Eichner, Mike Farah and Anna Wenger, executive producers; Doug Brady, co-executive producer; Elizabeth Baquet, producer	FunnyOrDie.com
2015 (67th)	Childrens Hospital	Rob Corddry, Jonathan Stern, David Wain, Keith Crofford and Mike Lazzo, executive producers; Ken Marino, co-executive producer	Adult Swim
2015 (67th)	Key & Peele Presents Van and Mike: The Ascension	Keegan-Michael Key, Jordan Peele, Peter Atencio, Ian Roberts and Jay Martel, executive producers; Matt Enlow, producer	ComedyCentral.com
2015 (67th)	Super Bowl XLIX Halftime Show Starring Katy Perry	Ricky Kirshner, executive producer; Rob Paine, supervising producer; Katy Perry, performer	NBC

=== 2020s ===
Year	Program	Producers	Network
2021 (73rd)
2021 (73rd)	Carpool Karaoke: The Series	Ben Winston, James Corden and Eric Pankowski, executive producers; David Young, co-executive producer; Sheila Rogers, supervising producer; Diana Miller, producer	Apple TV
2021 (73rd)	Late Night with Seth Meyers: Corrections	Seth Meyers, host; Mike Shoemaker, produced by	YouTube
2021 (73rd)	The Randy Rainbow Show	Randy Rainbow, executive producer/performer; John Retsios, Jeff Romley and Victoria Varela, producers	YouTube
2021 (73rd)	Reno 911! (Season 7: Part 2)	Thomas Lennon, Robert Ben Garant, Kerri Kenney-Silver, John Landgraf and Peter Principato, executive producers; David Lincoln, producer	Quibi
2021 (73rd)	Stephen Colbert Presents Tooning Out the News (Season 2: Part 1)	Stephen T. Colbert, Chris Licht, R.J. Fried and Tim Luecke, executive producers; Zach Smilovitz and Mike Leech, co-executive producers	Paramount+
2022 (74th)
2022 (74th)	Carpool Karaoke: The Series	Ben Winston, James Corden and Eric Pankowski, executive producers; David Young, co-executive producer; Blake Webster, producer	Apple TV+
2022 (74th)	I Think You Should Leave with Tim Robinson (Season 2)	Zach Kanin, Tim Robinson, Akiva Schaffer, Ali Bell, Alex Bach and Alice Mathias, executive producers	Netflix
2022 (74th)	Late Night with Seth Meyers: Corrections	Seth Meyers, executive producer/host; Mike Shoemaker, executive producer	YouTube
2022 (74th)	The Randy Rainbow Show	Randy Rainbow, executive producer; Victoria Varela, Michael J. Moritz Jr. and Jesse Kissel, producers	YouTube
2022 (74th)	Stephen Colbert Presents Tooning Out the News' (Season 2: Part 2)	R.J. Fried, Tim Luecke, Chris Licht and Stephen T. Colbert, executive producers; Zach Smilovitz and Mike Leech, co-executive producers	Paramount+
2023 (75th)
2023 (75th)	I Think You Should Leave with Tim Robinson (Season 3)	Tim Robinson, Zach Kanin, Akiva Schaffer, Ali Bell, Alex Bach and Alice Mathias, executive producers	Netflix
2023 (75th)	Awkwafina is Hangin' with Grandma	Nora Lum, Teresa Hsiao, Sean Fogel, Emily Moffatt and Harika Manne, executive producers; Minnie Bennett, supervising producer	Comedy Central
2023 (75th)	Better Call Saul: Filmmaker Training	Dan Appel, Melissa Bernstein, Peter Gould and Ariel Levine, executive producers; Dan Marcus, producer	AMC
2023 (75th)	Carpool Karaoke: The Series	Ben Winston, James Corden and Eric Pankowski, executive producers; David Young, co-executive producer; Blake Webster, producer	Apple TV+
2023 (75th)	Only Murders in the Building: One Killer Question (Season 2)	Dave Roth, Janice C. Molinari, Zuriht Serna, Trisha Choate, Jillian Novak and Xavier Salas, executive producers	Hulu
2024 (76th)
2024 (76th)	Only Murders in the Building: One Killer Question (Season 3)	Janice C. Molinari, Dave Roth, Zuriht Serna, Trisha Choate, Jillian Novak and Xavier Salas, executive producers	Hulu
2024 (76th)	Carpool Karaoke: The Series	Ben Winston, James Corden and Eric Pankowski, executive producers; David Young, co-executive producer; Blake Webster, producer	Apple TV+
2024 (76th)	The Eric Andre Show (Season 6)	Eric André, Kitao Sakurai, Dan Curry, Dave Kneebone, Mike Rosenstein and Walter Newman, executive producers	Adult Swim
2024 (76th)	Late Night with Seth Meyers: Corrections	Seth Meyers and Mike Shoemaker, executive producers	NBC
2024 (76th)	Real Time with Bill Maher: Overtime	Bill Maher, Sheila Griffiths, Marc Gurvitz, Billy Martin and Dean E. Johnsen, executive producers; Matt Wood, producer	HBO
2025 (77th)
2025 (77th)	The Daily Show: Desi Lydic Foxsplains	Desi Lydic, executive producer/host; Jen Flanz, executive producer; Ramin Hedayati, co-executive producer; Jocelyn Conn, producer; Matt Negrin and Jason Gilbert, produced by	YouTube
2025 (77th)	Late Night with Seth Meyers: Corrections	Seth Meyers, executive producer/host; Mike Shoemaker, executive producer	NBC
2025 (77th)	The Rabbit Hole with Jimmy Kimmel	Jimmy Kimmel, executive producer/host; Danny Ricker, co-executive producer; Jesse Joyce, Jonathan Kimmel, Sarah Robe and Jason Bielski, producers	YouTube
2025 (77th)	The Tonight Show: During Commercial Break	Nick Dyer and Sarah Connell, supervising producers; Jimmy Fallon, producer/host; Chris Miller, producer; Joseph Ferraro and Erin Clewell, produced by	YouTube
2026 (78th)
2026 (78th)	Colbert Before Air	Stephen T. Colbert, executive producer; Alisha Zafar, Willa Yeh, Maite Elias-Nava, Ashley Ioveno and Claire Tadokoro, produced by	YouTube
2026 (78th)	Bad Thoughts	Tom Segura, Ryan P. Hall, Jeremy Konner, Rami Hachache, Molly Mandel and Jason Korstad, executive producers	Netflix
2026 (78th)	The Daily Show: Desi Lydic Foxsplains	Desi Lydic and Jen Flanz, executive producers; Ramin Hedayati, co-executive producer; Jocelyn Conn, producer; Jason Gilbert and Matt Negrin, produced by	YouTube
2026 (78th)	The Randy Rainbow Show	Randy Rainbow, executive producer; Michael J. Moritz Jr. and Victoria Varela, producers	YouTube
2026 (78th)	SubwayTakes with Kareem Rahma	Kareem Rahma, executive producer/host; Andrew Kuo, executive producer	YouTube

== Programs with multiple awards ==
5 wins

- Carpool Karaoke: The Series (Apple Music/Apple TV+)

3 wins

- Childrens Hospital (Adult Swim)

2 wins

- Between Two Ferns (FunnyOrDie)

== Programs with multiple nominations ==
7 nominations

- Carpool Karaoke: The Series

5 nominations

- Childrens Hospital

4 nominations

- Honest Trailers
- Late Night with Seth Meyers: Corrections

3 nominations

- 30 Rock: The Webisodes
- Between Two Ferns
- The Daily Show: Correspondents Explain
- Gay of Thrones
- Hack Into Broad City
- Park Bench with Steve Buscemi
- The Randy Rainbow Show

2 nominations

- An Emmy for Megan
- Billy on the Street
- The Daily Show: Between the Scenes
- The Daily Show: Desi Lydic Foxsplains
- Epic Rap Battles of History
- I Think You Should Leave with Tim Robinson
- Only Murders in the Building: One Killer Question
- Reno 911!
- Stephen Colbert Presents Tooning Out the News
