= List of awards and nominations received by Bob Odenkirk =

Bob Odenkirk awards and nominations
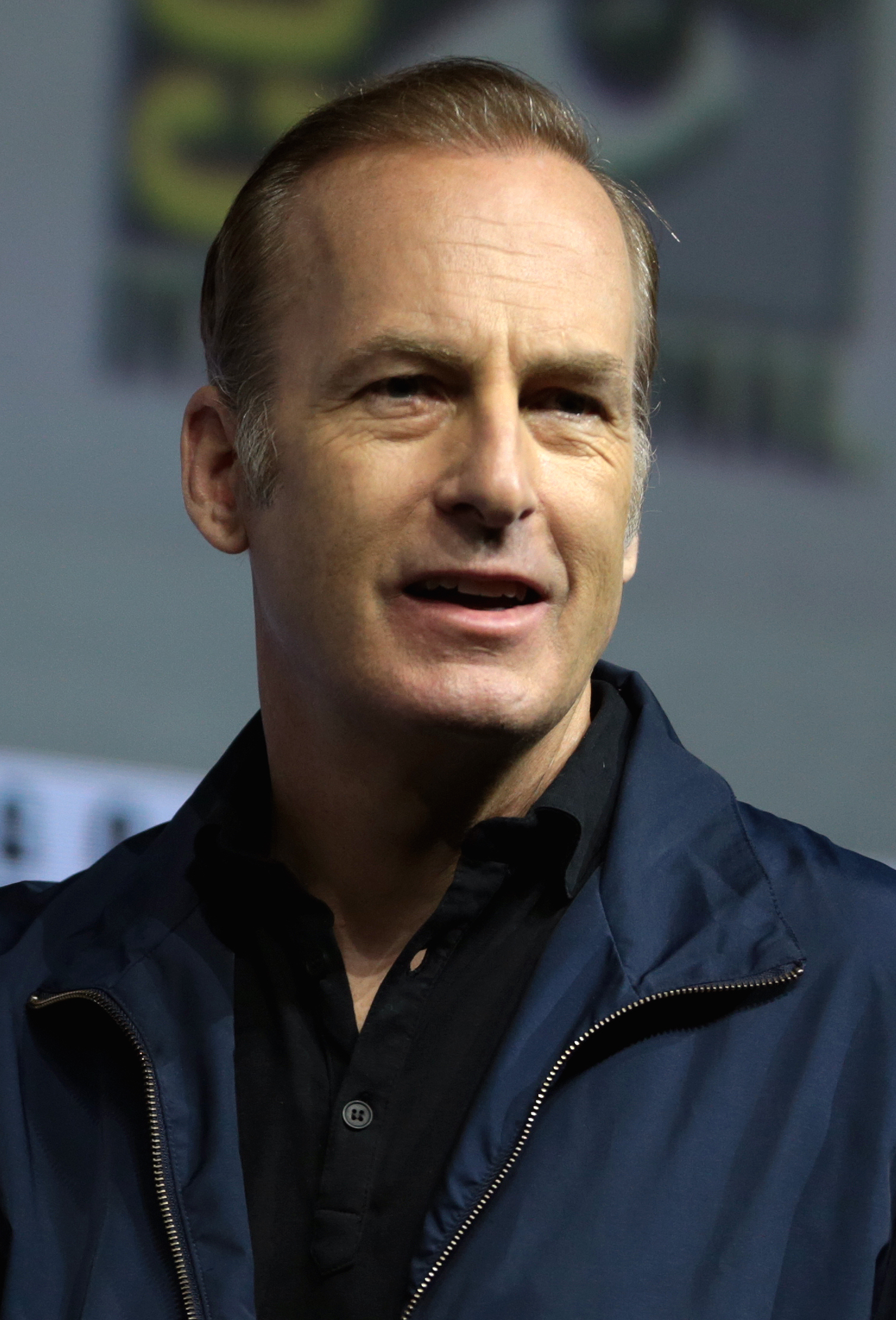
- Odenkirk at the 2018 San Diego Comic Con
Awards and nominations
Award	Wins	Nominations
Critics' Choice	3	8
DVDX Awards	1	3
Emmy Awards	2	21
Golden Globes	0	5
Golden Raspberry Awards	2	3
PGA Awards	0	5
Phoenix Film Festival	2	2
SAG Awards	1	11
Satellite Awards	3	6
Saturn Awards	1	2
TCA Awards	0	3
Other	7	10

Totals (Note: Certain award groups do not simply award one winner. They acknowledge several different recipients, have runners-up, and have third place. Since this is a specific recognition and is different from losing an award, runner-up mentions are considered wins in this award tally. For simplification and to avoid errors, each award in this list has been presumed to have had a prior nomination.)
- Wins: 22
- Nominations: 79

The following is a list of awards and nominations received by Bob Odenkirk.

Bob Odenkirk is an American actor and comedian. Odenkirk started a career in comedy before transitioning to more dramatic work on stage and screen. Over his career he has won two Primetime Emmy Awards, a Screen Actors Guild Award, and three Critics' Choice Television Awards as well as nominations for five Golden Globe Awards, five Producers Guild of America Awards, and a Tony Award.

Odenkirk started his professional career as a writer for various sketch comedy series, starting with the NBC series Saturday Night Live (1987–1991) followed by the MTV series The Ben Stiller Show (1992) and the HBO series Mr. Show with Bob and David (1995–1998). For work on these shows he was nominated for six Primetime Emmy Awards for Outstanding Writing for a Variety Series, winning twice in 1989 and 1993. He made his directorial film debut with Melvin Goes to Dinner (2003) for which he won several prizes from the Avignon Film Festival, Independent Film Festival Boston, the Phoenix Film Festival, the Sidewalk Film Festival, the Slamdance Film Festival, and the South by Southwest Film Festival.

As an actor, he took a recurring supporting role playing a charismatic but sketchy lawyer Saul Goodman in the AMC drama series Breaking Bad (2009–2013) for which he won the Screen Actors Guild Award for Outstanding Ensemble in a Drama Series in 2013. He reprised his role this time as the lead of the AMC prequel spinoff series Better Call Saul (2015–2022) for which he received widespread acclaim as well as three Critics' Choice Television Awards for Best Actor in a Drama Series as well as six nominations for the Primetime Emmy Awards, five nominations for the Golden Globe Awards, and five nominations for the Screen Actors Guild Award for Outstanding Lead Actor in a Drama Series.

As an actor on film, he took a supporting role as Ross Grant in the Alexander Payne road dramedy Nebraska (2013) earning a Critics' Choice Movie Awards nomination, and a leading role as Hutch Mansell, a former government assassin in the action film Nobody (2021), which he also served as a producer, earning a Critics' Choice Super Awards nomination. On television, he took a recurring guest role as Uncle Lee Lane in the FX on Hulu dramedy series The Bear (2023–) for which he was nominated for the Primetime Emmy Award for Outstanding Guest Actor in a Comedy Series. On stage, made his Broadway debut playing Shelley Levene, a weathered, once-successful real estate salesman in the 2024 revival of the David Mamet play Glengarry Glen Ross for which he was nominated for the Tony Award for Best Featured Actor in a Play.

== Major associations ==
=== Critics' Choice Awards ===
Year	Category	Nominated work	Result	Ref.
Critics' Choice Awards
2013	Best Acting Ensemble	Nebraska	Nominated	
Critics' Choice Super Awards
2021	Best Actor in an Action Movie	Nobody	Nominated	
2026	Best Actor in an Action Movie	Nobody 2	Nominated	
Critics' Choice Television Awards
2015	Best Actor in a Drama Series	Better Call Saul (season one)	Won	
2016	Best Actor in a Drama Series	Better Call Saul (season two)	Won	
2017	Best Actor in a Drama Series	Better Call Saul (season three)	Nominated	
2018	Best Actor in a Drama Series	Better Call Saul (season four)	Nominated	
2020	Best Actor in a Drama Series	Better Call Saul (season five)	Nominated	
2023	Best Actor in a Drama Series	Better Call Saul (season six)	Won	

=== Emmy Awards ===
Primetime Emmy Awards
Year	Category	Nominated work	Result	Ref.
1989	Outstanding Writing for a Variety or Music Program	Saturday Night Live (season 14)	Won	
1990	Outstanding Writing for a Variety or Music Program	Saturday Night Live (season 15)	Nominated	
1991	Outstanding Writing for a Variety or Music Program	Saturday Night Live (season 16)	Nominated	
1993	Outstanding Writing for a Variety or Music Program	The Ben Stiller Show	Won	
1998	Outstanding Writing for a Variety or Music Program	Mr. Show with Bob and David (season 3)	Nominated	
1998	Outstanding Music and Lyrics	Mr. Show with Bob and David ("How High the Mountain")	Nominated	
1999	Outstanding Writing for a Variety or Music Program	Mr. Show with Bob and David (season 4)	Nominated	
2015	Outstanding Drama Series	Better Call Saul (season 1)	Nominated	
2015	Outstanding Lead Actor in a Drama Series	Better Call Saul (episode: "Pimento")	Nominated	
2016	Outstanding Drama Series	Better Call Saul (season 2)	Nominated	
2016	Outstanding Lead Actor in a Drama Series	Better Call Saul (episode: "Klick")	Nominated	
2017	Outstanding Drama Series	Better Call Saul (season 3)	Nominated	
2017	Outstanding Lead Actor in a Drama Series	Better Call Saul (episode: "Expenses")	Nominated	
2019	Outstanding Drama Series	Better Call Saul (season 4)	Nominated	
2019	Outstanding Lead Actor in a Drama Series	Better Call Saul (episode: "Winner")	Nominated	
2020	Outstanding Drama Series	Better Call Saul (season 5)	Nominated	
2022	Outstanding Drama Series	Better Call Saul (season 6 part 1)	Nominated	
2022	Outstanding Lead Actor in a Drama Series	Better Call Saul (episode: "Plan and Execution")	Nominated	
2023	Outstanding Drama Series	Better Call Saul (season 6 part 2)	Nominated	
2023	Outstanding Lead Actor in a Drama Series	Better Call Saul (episode: "Saul Gone")	Nominated	
2024	Outstanding Guest Actor in a Comedy Series	The Bear (episode: "Fishes")	Nominated	

=== Golden Globe Awards ===
Year	Category	Nominated work	Result	Ref.
2016	Best Actor in a Television Series – Drama	Better Call Saul (season one)	Nominated	
2017	Best Actor in a Television Series – Drama	Better Call Saul (season two)	Nominated	
2018	Best Actor in a Television Series – Drama	Better Call Saul (season three)	Nominated	
2021	Best Actor in a Television Series – Drama	Better Call Saul (season four)	Nominated	
2023	Best Actor in a Television Series – Drama	Better Call Saul (season five)	Nominated	

=== Screen Actors Guild Awards ===
Year	Category	Nominated work	Result	Ref.
2011	Outstanding Ensemble in a Drama Series	Breaking Bad (season four)	Nominated	
2012	Outstanding Ensemble in a Drama Series	Breaking Bad (season five part 1)	Nominated	
2013	Outstanding Ensemble in a Drama Series	Breaking Bad (season five part 2)	Won	
2015	Outstanding Male Actor in a Drama Series	Better Call Saul (season one)	Nominated	
2017	Outstanding Male Actor in a Drama Series	Better Call Saul (season three)	Nominated	
2018	Outstanding Male Actor in a Drama Series	Better Call Saul (season four)	Nominated	
2018	Outstanding Ensemble in a Drama Series	Better Call Saul (season four)	Nominated	
2020	Outstanding Ensemble in a Drama Series	Better Call Saul (season five)	Nominated	
2020	Outstanding Male Actor in a Drama Series	Better Call Saul (season five)	Nominated	
2022	Outstanding Male Actor in a Drama Series	Better Call Saul (season six)	Nominated	
2022	Outstanding Ensemble in a Drama Series	Better Call Saul (season six)	Nominated	

=== Tony Awards ===
Year	Category	Nominated work	Result	Ref.
2025	Best Featured Actor in a Play	Glengarry Glen Ross	Nominated	

== Other awards and nominations ==
Organizations	Year	Category	Work	Result	Ref.
Avignon Film Festival	2003	Best Feature	Melvin Goes to Dinner	Won	
Boston Society of Film Critics	2013	Best Ensemble Cast	Nebraska	Won	
CableACE Awards	1997	Best Original Song	Mr. Show with Bob and David	Won	
DVDX Awards	2003	Best Director	Melvin Goes to Dinner	Nominated	
DVDX Awards	2003	Best Original Song	Run Ronnie Run!	Nominated	
DVDX Awards	2003	Best Original Song	Run Ronnie Run!	Won	(Note: Two different songs were nominated.)
Golden Raspberry Awards	2014	Worst Director (Shared)	Movie 43	Won	
Golden Raspberry Awards	2014	Worst Screenplay (Shared)	Movie 43	Won	
Golden Raspberry Awards	2014	Worst Screen Combo (Shared)	Movie 43	Nominated	
Independent Film Festival Boston	2003	Audience Award	Melvin Goes to Dinner	Won	
Peabody Awards	2023	Best Drama	Better Call Saul	Won	
Phoenix Film Festival	2003	Best Picture	Melvin Goes to Dinner	Won	
Phoenix Film Festival	2003	Best Ensemble	Melvin Goes to Dinner	Won	
Producers Guild of America	2016	Outstanding Producer of Episodic Television – Drama	Better Call Saul	Nominated	
Producers Guild of America	2017	Outstanding Producer of Episodic Television – Drama	Better Call Saul	Nominated	
Producers Guild of America	2019	Outstanding Producer of Episodic Television – Drama	Better Call Saul	Nominated	
Producers Guild of America	2021	Outstanding Producer of Episodic Television – Drama	Better Call Saul	Nominated	
Producers Guild of America	2023	Outstanding Producer of Episodic Television – Drama	Better Call Saul	Nominated	
Satellite Awards	2014	Best Ensemble – Motion Picture	Nebraska	Won	
Satellite Awards	2016	Best Actor in a Television Series – Drama	Better Call Saul	Nominated	
Satellite Awards	2017	Best Actor in a Television Series – Drama	Better Call Saul	Nominated	
Satellite Awards	2019	Best Actor in a Television Series – Drama	Better Call Saul	Nominated	
Satellite Awards	2021	Best Actor in a Television Series – Drama	Better Call Saul	Won	
Satellite Awards	2023	Best Actor in a Television Series – Drama	Better Call Saul	Won	
Saturn Awards	2021	Best Actor on Television	Better Call Saul	Nominated	
Saturn Awards	2022	Best Actor in a Network or Cable Television Series	Better Call Saul	Won	
Seattle Film Critics Awards	2014	Best Ensemble Cast	Nebraska	Nominated	
Sidewalk Moving Picture Festival	2003	Best Feature Film	Melvin Goes to Dinner	Won	
Slamdance Film Festival	2003	Grand Jury Prize	Melvin Goes to Dinner	Nominated	
South by Southwest Film Festival	2003	Narrative First Film Award	Melvin Goes to Dinner	Won	
TCA Awards	2015	Individual Achievement in Drama	Better Call Saul	Nominated	
TCA Awards	2016	Individual Achievement in Drama	Better Call Saul	Nominated	
TCA Awards	2022	Individual Achievement in Drama	Better Call Saul	Nominated	
