= Scott Aukerman =

American actor and comedian

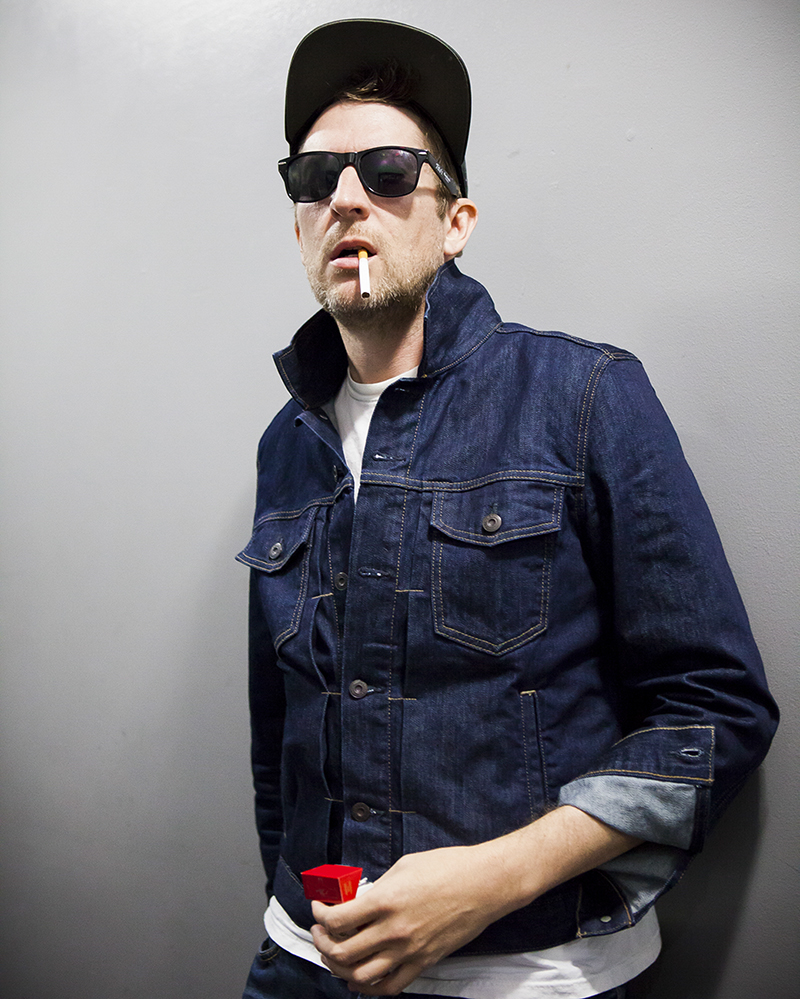
- Aukerman in 2014
- Born: Scott David Aukerman; July 2, 1970 (age 56); Savannah, Georgia, U.S.
- Occupations: Actor; writer; director; comedian
- Years active: 1996–present
- Spouse: Kulap Vilaysack (m. 2008)
- Children: 1
- Website: scottaukerman.tumblr.com

Scott David Aukerman (born July 2, 1970) is an American writer, actor, comedian, television personality, director, producer, and podcast host. He was a writer and performer in the later seasons of the sketch series Mr. Show from 1996 to 1998. Aukerman is currently the host of the weekly comedy podcast Comedy Bang! Bang! and formerly the IFC original television series of the same name. Aukerman is the co-creator of Between Two Ferns with Zach Galifianakis and co-founder of the Earwolf podcast network.

== Early life ==
Aukerman was born on July 2, 1970, in Savannah, Georgia to Burt and Linda Aukerman. His father was a pilot for the U.S. National Guard who fought in the Vietnam War and was stationed in Savannah. Shortly after he was born, his family moved to Orange County, California. He attended Cypress High School and the Orange County School of the Arts, studying acting and musical theater and writing plays in his spare time. Aukerman was raised in a religiously observant household, attending a Baptist church three times a week until college. He hosted a public-access television show called Centurion Highlights, based on the school's mascot. In a 2015 interview, Aukerman said "I'm still doing that same show, just with celebrities instead of my high school cafeteria." He started a short-lived band, The Naked Postmen, with Adrian Young, who went on to be the drummer for No Doubt.

While attending Orange Coast College in Costa Mesa, he and fellow student B. J. Porter began writing together when they were both scripting and performing in a radio show called Lutz Radio.

== Career ==
After a brief period studying at the Pacific Conservatory of the Performing Arts and touring the country as a musical theater actor, in 1995, at the request of his friends, Aukerman and Porter started performing at The Comedy Store in Los Angeles under the moniker "The Fun Bunch", a name meant to parody improvisation groups at the time.

Mr. Show co-creator Bob Odenkirk was in the audience for the second performance, and soon tapped the duo to write for and occasionally perform on the show in its fourth season. This led to an Emmy nomination in 1999 for Aukerman and the rest of the staff. Aukerman appeared sporadically on the show, most notably as the model Theo Brixton in the Taint Magazine sketch.

After the show's cancellation, Aukerman and Porter segued into writing film and television scripts, most notably Run Ronnie Run! and the first draft of the film Tenacious D in The Pick of Destiny. In 2004, he and Porter received an "Additional Dialogue" credit on the animated feature film Shark Tale. They went on to write an unproduced script for the sequel, as well as an unproduced Shrek spin-off film based on the character Puss in Boots. In 2007, a feature film script he wrote with Porter and Odenkirk, titled Kanan Rhodes: Unkillable Servant of Justice, was purchased by MTV Films with the intent of starring Rainn Wilson, although it currently remains unproduced. Also in 2007, Aukerman released a self-described "joke record", Scott Aukerman's Koo Koo Roo's Greatest Hits, which featured Aukerman and Sarah Silverman Program writer Jon Schroeder shouting over current soft-rock hits. This was put out in limited release on AST Records.

In 2009, Aukerman and Porter wrote a pilot script for NBC, titled Privates. The network ultimately passed on the show. That year, Aukerman took on the role as head writer for the 2009 MTV Movie Awards and executive produced and co-wrote a pilot for Comedy Central, The New Andy Dick Show. The network ultimately passed on ordering it to series.

In 2010, Aukerman wrote a feature film script for friend Zach Galifianakis for Fox, and he and Patton Oswalt co-wrote a television pilot for Fox, which the network ultimately passed on. Later that year, Aukerman joined a "writers lab", writing film scripts for Imagine Entertainment.

=== Comedy Death-Ray/Comedy Bang! Bang! ===
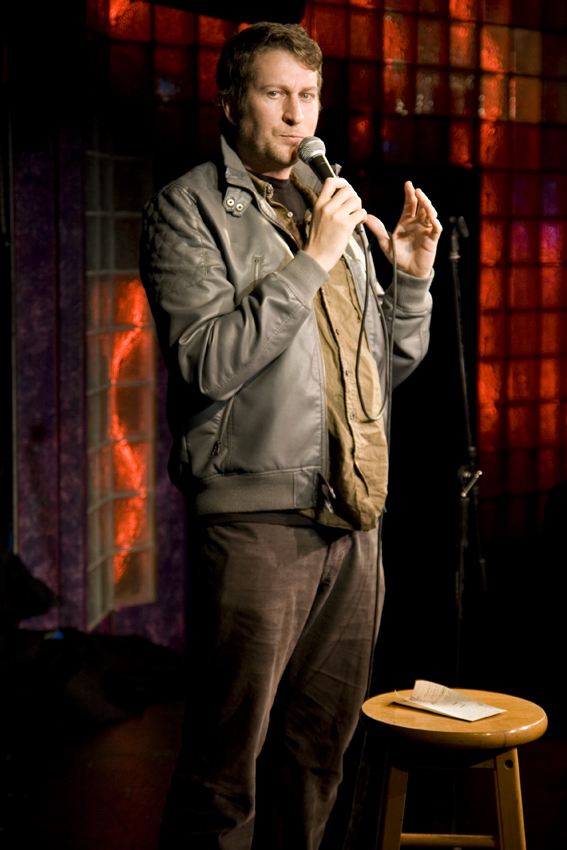
Aukerman in 2010

In 2002, Aukerman and Porter started the successful alternative comedy showcase Comedy Death-Ray, which ran Tuesday night at the M Bar in Los Angeles. Porter had friends in common with M Bar owner Joe Reynolds, and visited the bar shortly after its opening. Upon seeing how empty M Bar was, Porter convinced Reynolds to let him start a comedy show to help business. The show eventually moved to the Upright Citizens Brigade Theatre in 2005 to gain more creative freedom. A Comedy Death-Ray CD taped partially in San Francisco at the SF Sketchfest and partially at their fourth-anniversary, all-night show in LA was released on Comedy Central Records on September 11, 2007. The CD featured Aukerman, comedians David Cross, Patton Oswalt, Paul F. Tompkins, and other CDR regulars.

In 2007, Aukerman and Porter produced several internet shorts with Comedy Death-Ray comedians for the internet site Super Deluxe. These included three episodes of The Brody Stevens Interview Challenge, and two episodes of Lake Charles Lake, in which he also co-starred. They made more shorts in 2008, but the site was shut down and folded into Adult Swim before they could air.

In 2007, Aukerman and B. J. Porter created and produced a sketch pilot, titled The Right Now! Show, based on their show for Fox. However, the network passed on ordering it to series in late 2007. Cast member Casey Wilson was immediately hired as a featured cast member of Saturday Night Live after the news. A short film made for the show, Between Two Ferns with Zach Galifianakis, eventually moved to internet site Funny Or Die, becoming one of its most successful series.

Starting January 3, 2011, Aukerman became the host of a series of interview interstitials, titled Comedy Death-Ray, airing three nights a week on the IFC network, where he interviews stars and creators of shows that the network runs, including The Ben Stiller Show, The Larry Sanders Show, Mr. Show, Freaks and Geeks, Undeclared, and Arrested Development.

In 2011, Aukerman and Porter parted ways, and the Comedy Death-Ray live show was renamed Comedy Bang! Bang! The Comedy Bang! Bang! live show ended in December 2012 after ten years.

=== Comedy Bang! Bang!: The Podcast ===
Being a frequent guest on and admirer of the award-winning podcast Never Not Funny with Jimmy Pardo led Aukerman to the decision that he should start his own comedy podcast. On May 1, 2009, Aukerman started to host Comedy Death-Ray Radio, a comedy-themed broadcast based upon the live show, on Los Angeles radio station Indie 103.1. The show continued to air on Fridays at 12 noon Pacific but moved to being distributed by the Earwolf podcasting network in 2010. The podcast of each show is available weekly on iTunes and the Earwolf website and has been downloaded several million times.

Aukerman hosts, with frequent guest collaborators Paul F. Tompkins, Lauren Lapkus, Neil Campbell, Jason Mantzoukas, Mike Hanford, James Adomian, Nick Kroll, Andy Daly, and the late Harris Wittels among others, serving as guests and characters. Entertainment Weekly called the show "often strange, consistently hilarious, always unpredictable," and The A.V. Club named it one of 2010's "Best Podcasts." In May 2011, Aukerman renamed the show Comedy Bang! Bang! On December 4, 2013, The A.V. Club named Comedy Bang! Bang! the best podcast of 2013. In 2018, Time Magazine named Comedy Bang! Bang! one of The 50 Best Podcasts to Listen to Right Now.

On June 8, 2012 IFC premiered the television series Comedy Bang! Bang!, hosted by Aukerman. On December 2, 2016, the series ended after five seasons and 110 episodes.

In 2021, Aukerman launched Comedy Bang Bang World, a subscription service independent from Earwolf that includes ad-free access to the podcast's full archives, the live shows, archives to other programs like Threedom and Womp It Up!, and exclusive podcasts like CBB Presents and Scott Hasn't Seen. Earwolf still distributes the free ad-supported versions of Comedy Bang! Bang! and Threedom, both of which he hosts.

=== Between Two Ferns with Zach Galifianakis ===
One sketch from Aukerman and Porter's sketch show The Right Now! Show, Between Two Ferns with Zach Galifianakis, was put up on internet site Funny Or Die and received several hundreds of thousands of hits in just a few days.

This was followed by Ferns interviews with talk-show host Jimmy Kimmel, Mad Men star Jon Hamm, Natalie Portman, Bradley Cooper, Charlize Theron, Conan O'Brien, Ben Stiller, Steve Carell, Sean Penn, Bruce Willis, Jennifer Aniston, Will Ferrell, "Oscar Buzz Edition" (featuring Jennifer Lawrence, Christoph Waltz, Naomi Watts, Amy Adams, Anne Hathaway, Jessica Chastain, Sally Field and Bradley Cooper), a collaboration video with The Lonely Island and James Franco, and a "Happy Holidays Edition" featuring Samuel L. Jackson, Tobey Maguire and Arcade Fire. Aukerman directed the Theron, O'Brien, Penn, Willis, Ferrell, "Oscar Buzz," Bieber, Franco & "Happy Holidays Edition" episodes.

In March 2014, an episode was released with President Barack Obama. It was designed to bring attention to the Affordable Care Act. Galifianakis engaged in his regular insult comedy style of interviewing, which the President reciprocated throughout the interview. Within 24 hours, the video of this interview had amassed upwards of 14 million views. Aukerman directed and produced this episode, which won the 2014 Emmy Award for Outstanding Short-Format Live-Action Entertainment Program.

Each episode has been viewed millions of times. Funny Or Die's most popular videos ever were the episodes about President Barack Obama, Hillary Clinton, Justin Bieber, Brad Pitt, and Natalie Portman.

In 2015, Aukerman won the Primetime Emmy Award for Outstanding Short-Format Live-Action Entertainment Program again, this time for the Brad Pitt episode.

=== Earwolf ===
In 2010, based upon the success of his podcast, Aukerman, along with Jeff Ullrich, started the Earwolf network, eventually producing and releasing several podcasts. In 2011, they announced a partnership with Funny Or Die. In 2014, they launched a sister network Wolfpop, under the curation of comedian Paul Scheer. On March 7, 2016, the majority of Wolfpop's programs were folded over into Earwolf.

=== Podcasts with Adam Scott ===
Aukerman has a long-standing friendship with American actor Adam Scott, who first appeared on Comedy Bang Bang! in 2010 and also appeared in multiple episodes of the TV adaptation. Though having appeared on over a dozen episodes as a guest, Scott is best known on the podcast for his episodes alongside Parks and Recreation writers Chelsea Peretti and Harris Wittels, which were dubbed Farts and Procreation. Four Farts episodes were recorded, with the final being posthumously released in 2015 following Wittels' death. Aukerman and Scott bonded over their love of both comedy and music, and have since launched multiple music-based comedy podcasts about various bands and artists.

The pair's first podcast was called U Talkin' U2 To Me? Launched in 2014, it was ostensibly devoted to the career and discography of the band U2. Most episodes combined discussion of the band with running gags and comedy bits only marginally related to the band. The podcast ultimately led to Aukerman and Scott interviewing the band themselves, as well as being invited to see them live. Following a review of Songs of Experience in 2017, the podcast became more infrequent. Three episodes were released in 2018: A "Slowin' It Down" with Phoebe Robinson and Andy Daly, and a two-part recap of the Experience + Innocence Tour. The podcast returned in 2023 for two episodes, where Aukerman and Scott reviewed the compilation Songs of Surrender as well as the band's Las Vegas live show U2:UV Achtung Baby Live at Sphere.

In 2018, Aukerman and Scott started a new podcast called R U Talkin' R.E.M. RE: ME?, focused on the band R.E.M. This podcast also led to Aukerman and Scott interviewing members of the band, such as Michael Stipe and Mike Mills, as well as a guest appearance from Peter Buck at a live episode for Clusterfest.

Aukerman and Scott began a new podcast in July 2020, R U Talkin' RHCP RE: Me? The podcast's intention was to cover the music of the Red Hot Chili Peppers, focusing on the band's self-titled debut and Freaky Styley in the first episode. This format, however, was abandoned in the show's second episode. Instead, the duo chose to focus on Talking Heads, changing the podcast name to U Talkin' Talking Heads 2 My Talking Head and going through the band's discography for the remainder of 2020. They eventually reprised the R U Talkin' RHCP format for two episodes in 2022, covering Unlimited Love and Return of the Dream Canteen.

In September 2023, Aukerman and Scott returned with their first new format in three years: U Springin' Springsteen On My Bean? The podcast is dedicated to the music of Bruce Springsteen. The first episode of the show, released on September 12, covered Springsteen's 1973 debut album Greetings from Asbury Park, N.J.

Aukerman and Scott have also occasionally produced one-off editions of the podcast. During early episodes of U Talkin' U2 To Me?, Aukerman and Scott began a running joke of singing the Staind song "It's Been Awhile" whenever they said the titular phrase – often pairing it with the opening line of Barenaked Ladies' "One Week". A fan on Twitter suggested the pair create a one-off format entitled Staind Glass, in which they discuss the music of Staind with comedian Todd Glass. This came to fruition in May 2014, with Glass joining the pair in the studio to listen to the band's 2001 album Break the Cycle. In June 2018, Glass returned to the show for a sequel episode. That same year, Vulture dubbed the original Staind Glass as the best episode of U Talkin' U2 To Me? – noting that "no episode better exemplifies, while slightly subverting, the bit-heavy, irony-drenched humor" of the show. In 2020, the pair created a one-off version of the format entitled Youey Talkin' Huey 2ey Me?, with special guests Huey Lewis and Jimmy Kimmel. The episode was dedicated to the music of Huey Lewis and the News, to promote the band's album Weather.

== Artistry ==
Aukerman's work has been described as "gloriously silly," and "masterful comedy and improvisation." Although Tom Lennon's first reaction to the initial episode of Comedy Bang! Bang! was "no one's going to listen to this," Aukerman has since been lauded as the ringleader of a podcast that is, according to Vulture, "a consistent circus of experimentation by some of comedy's most creative minds." His influence on contemporary comedy, by way of highlighting emerging talent, has earned him the title of "the alternative Lorne Michaels."

== Personal life ==
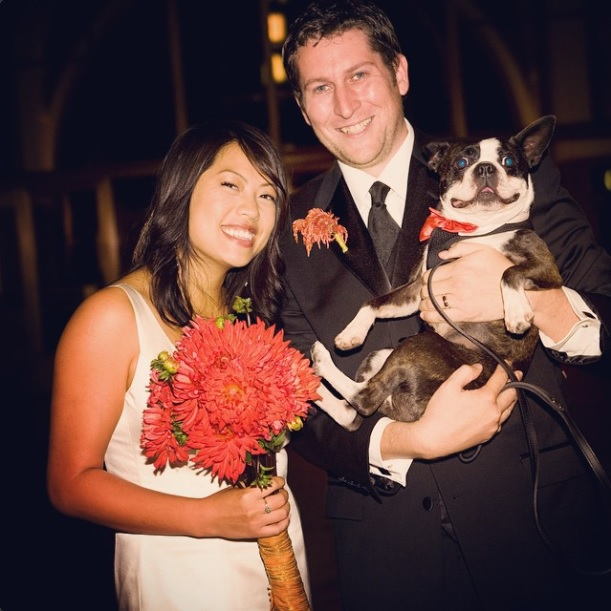
Aukerman with his wife Kulap Vilaysack

Since 2008, Aukerman has been married to Kulap Vilaysack. In 2022, Aukerman and Vilaysack had a daughter.

Aukerman is a fan of comic books and has authored and co-authored several titles, including Astonishing Spider-Man, X-Men and Secret Wars issues. He has collected DVDs and Blu-rays, and is an avid filmgoer and fan of cinema venues.

== Work ==
=== Film ===
Year	Title	Role	Notes
2001	That Darn Punk	Mr. Hollywood Pants	Video
2002	Run Ronnie Run!	Starving Kidnapper	Also writer
2002	Austin Powers in Goldmember	Young Nigel	
2003	Melvin Goes to Dinner	Policeman #1	
2004	Shark Tale	—N/a	Additional dialogue
2005	Cake Boy	Mickey	
2019	Between Two Ferns: The Movie	—N/a	Writer, director, and producer
2022	Weird: The Al Yankovic Story	Police Officer	
2022	The People's Joker	Mr. Freeze (voice)	

=== Television ===
Year	Title	Role	Notes
1996–1998	Mr. Show with Bob and David	Various	9 episodes; also writer
1999	Just Shoot Me!	Greenberg	Episode: "Maya's Nude Photos"
2001	The Huntress	Phil Hegel	Episode: "Now You See Him"
2001	Next!	—N/a	Television film; writer, director, and co-executive producer
2002	The Offensive Show	—N/a	Television film; writer and executive producer
2006	Cheap Seats: Without Ron Parker	Andrew Merchant	Episode: "Amazing Games: International Toughmen"
2007–2010	The Sarah Silverman Program	Agent Falconer / Banana Cop	2 episodes
2007	The Right Now! Show	Various	Pilot; creator, director, and executive producer
2007	Moral Orel	—N/a	Writer
2008	David's Situation	To Catch A Predator Producer	Pilot
2008–2018	Between Two Ferns with Zach Galifianakis	—N/a	Creator, director, and executive producer
2009	Lewis Black's Root of All Evil	Karate Kid Victim	Episode: "Gen-X vs Boomers"
2009	2009 MTV Movie Awards	—N/a	Head writer
2011	Comedy Death-Ray	Himself (host)	Interstitials for IFC
2011	Childrens Hospital	Desperate Dad	Episode: "Stryker Bites the Dust"
2011	Curb Your Enthusiasm	Police Officer	Episode: "Palestinian Chicken"
2012	Between Two Ferns: A Fairytale of New York	—N/a	Television special; director and executive producer
2012–2016	Comedy Bang! Bang!	Himself (host)	110 episodes; also creator, writer, and executive producer
2013–2017	@midnight	Himself	10 episodes
2014	The Birthday Boys	Parker Van Dell	Episode: "Freshy's"
2014–2015	TripTank	Various voices	3 episodes
2015	67th Primetime Emmy Awards	—N/a	Television special; writer
2015	W/ Bob & David	Various	Episode #1.3; also writer
2016	Animals.	Drug Dealer (voice)	Episode: "Pigeons"
2016	88th Academy Awards	—N/a	Television special; writer
2016–2019	Bajillion Dollar Propertie$	Tobin	Episode: "Brtox"; also executive producer
2016–2018	Take My Wife	—N/a	Executive producer and director
2017	Michael Bolton's Big, Sexy Valentine's Day Special	Security Guard #1	Television special; also writer, director, and executive producer
2017	Brooklyn Nine-Nine	Glandis	Episode: "Crime and Punishment"
2017–2018	Sick Note	—N/a	Consulting producer
2018–2024	Big City Greens	Radio DJ (voice)	3 episodes
2019	I'm Sorry	Rob	3 episodes
2020	Aunty Donna's Big Ol' House of Fun	Police Officer	2 episodes; also executive producer
2020–2025	The George Lucas Talk Show	Himself	2 episodes
2025	Gastronauts	Himself	Episode: "I'll Know It When I Taste It"
2026	Invincible	Captain Pikell (voice)	2 episodes

=== Podcasts ===
- Comedy Bang! Bang! (2009–present), host
- Analyze Phish (2011–2014), co-host
- U Talkin' U2 To Me? (2014–present), co-host
  - R U Talkin' R.E.M. RE: Me?, co-host
  - U Talkin' Talking Heads 2 My Talking Head, co-host
  - U Springin' Springsteen On My Bean?, co-host
- Threedom (2018–present), co-host
- We Have to Stop Talking TMNT on CBB (2020), co-host
- Scott Hasn't Seen (2021–present), co-host
- CBB-FM (2021–present), host

=== Internet ===
- Lake Charles Lake (2007), on Super Deluxe
- The Fun Bunch (2008), on Super Deluxe
- The Four Flop-Tops (2009), Funny Or Die video
- Lost with Paul Scheer (2009), internet ARG for the TV show Lost
- Sizzle Alert: LOST with Sarah Silverman (2010), Funny Or Die video

== Discography ==
=== Albums ===
Studio

- 2007: Scott Aukerman's Koo Koo Roo's Greatest Hits
- 2008: Never Not Christmas – A Holiday E.P. (with Jimmy Pardo)

Compilation

- 2007: Comedy Death-Ray
- 2009: Comedy By The Numbers
- 2009: Comedy Death-Ray Xmas CD 2009 (also executive producer)
- 2010: Comedy Death-Ray Xmas CD 2010 (also executive producer)

Other

- 2006: Brian Posehn – Live In: Nerd Rage (performs sketch with Brian Posehn and Bob Odenkirk)
- 2007: Eban Schletter's Witching Hour (sings the song "I've Created A Monster")
- 2008: R.O. Magic: The Best of R.O. Manse (as S.E. Duction)

Background vocals

- "That's My Girl" by The Vandals; appears on Look What I Almost Stepped In...
- "Dirty White Boy" by The Vandals; unreleased
- "Heigh Ho" by The Vandals; appears on Mosh Pit On Disney, Japanese compilation album

== Bibliography ==
=== Books ===
- Aukerman, Scott (editor). Comedy Bang! Bang! The Podcast: The Book. Abrams Books, 2023. ISBN 978-1419754814

=== Comic books ===
- Deadpool (2012) #45 (5-page backup story)
- Secret Wars Journal #3 (10-page story)
- Spider-Man/Deadpool #6
- X-Men: Black – Mojo #1
- Astonishing Spider-Man (2024–2025)

== Awards and nominations ==
Year	Association	Category	Nominated work	Result
1999	Primetime Emmy Award	Outstanding Writing in a Variety or Music Program	Mr. Show with Bob and David	Nominated
2013	Primetime Emmy Award	Outstanding Short-Format Live-Action Entertainment Program	Between Two Ferns with Zach Galifianakis	Nominated
2014	Primetime Emmy Award	Outstanding Short-Format Live-Action Entertainment Program	Between Two Ferns with Zach Galifianakis	Won
2015	Primetime Emmy Award	Outstanding Short-Format Live-Action Entertainment Program	Between Two Ferns with Zach Galifianakis	Won
2017	Writers Guild of America Award	Comedy/Variety (Music, Awards, Tributes) – Specials	88th Academy Awards	Nominated
2018	Writers Guild of America Award	Comedy/Variety (Music, Awards, Tributes) – Specials	Michael Bolton's Big, Sexy Valentine's Day Special	Nominated
2020	Primetime Emmy Award	Outstanding Short Form Variety Series	Between Two Ferns with Zach Galifianakis: The Movie, Sorta Uncut Interviews	Nominated
