= Comedy Death-Ray (album) =

Compilation album by Various artists
- Released: September 11, 2007
- Genre: Stand-up comedy
- Length: 75:30 (disc one) 77:34 (disc two) 153:04 (total)
- Label: Comedy Central

Professional ratings
Review scores
Source	Rating
AllMusic	3.5/5 stars

Comedy Death-Ray is a two disc CD collection of highlights from the weekly comedy showcase Comedy Death-Ray (curated by Executive Producers Scott Aukerman and B. J. Porter), released on September 11, 2007, on Comedy Central Records. Disc one was recorded January 15, 2007, at Cobb's Comedy Club in San Francisco. Disc two was recorded at Comedy Death-Ray's twelve-hour fourth anniversary show September 30, 2006, at the Upright Citizens Brigade Theatre.

The two discs feature many of the "alternative" comedians who frequent the Los Angeles show, including Mr. Show veterans David Cross, Paul F. Tompkins, Brian Posehn and Scott Aukerman, Comedians of Comedy's Patton Oswalt and Maria Bamford, Never Not Funny host Jimmy Pardo, The Office star and writer Mindy Kaling, and a special performance by Thomas Lennon and Ben Garant of Comedy Central's Reno 911!, in character, singing a song about why one should not do drugs.

In addition to the listed tracks, there are two "hidden" tracks at the end of each disc. On Disc One, there is a track of Jimmy Pardo and Paul F. Tompkins engaging in witty repartee in front of the audience. Disc Two features a song by Hard 'n Phirm, performed at 7:30 in the morning, complimenting the audience on their ability to "Stay Awake" during the entire show.

== Track listing ==
Disc one

1. Paul F. Tompkins – 16:30
2. David Cross – 7:56
3. Doug Benson – 11:32
4. Maria Bamford – 16:01
5. Todd Glass – 14:33
6. Hard 'n Phirm – 8:58

Disc two

1. Patton Oswalt – 6:18
2. Jimmy Pardo – 11:01
3. Neil Hamburger – 11:25
4. Ian Edwards – 7:46
5. Brian Posehn – 4:10
6. Nick Thune – 6:25
7. Scott Aukerman – 5:36
8. Chris Hardwick – 5:42
9. Mindy Kaling – 4:19
10. Dan Mintz – 4:05
11. Andy Daly – 3:58
12. Reno 911! – 5:49
