= Melvin Goes to Dinner =

2003 American independent comedy film

- Film poster
- Directed by: Bob Odenkirk
- Written by: Michael Blieden
- Based on: Phyro-Giants! by Michael Blieden
- Produced by: Naomi Odenkirk; DJ Paul; Jeff Sussman
- Starring: Michael Blieden; Stephanie Courtney; Annabelle Gurwitch; Matt Price; David Cross; Maura Tierney
- Music by: Michael Penn
- Distributed by: Arrival Pictures
- Release date: January 2003 (Slamdance)
- Running time: 83 minutes
- Country: United States
- Language: English
- Box office: $4,168

Melvin Goes to Dinner is a 2003 American film adaptation of Michael Blieden's stage play Phyro-Giants!, directed by Bob Odenkirk in his directorial debut. Blieden wrote the screenplay from his stage play, and he also stars in the film (as he did in the Los Angeles stage production), along with Stephanie Courtney, Matt Price and Annabelle Gurwitch. The film premiered at the 2003 Slamdance Film Festival.

== Plot ==
Former medical student Melvin has dropped out and now works in a planning office of an unnamed city. The office supervisor is his older sister, who "mothers" him instead of pushing him to work harder. Melvin accidentally makes telephone contact with an old friend, and they decide to meet for dinner that evening. The friend arrives early for drinks with a female friend; by the appointed time, four people are involved, each connected somehow to at least one of the others. The evening passes in a leisurely dinner with much conversation, with the connections among the parties revealed throughout the evening.

== Cast ==
- Michael Blieden as Melvin
- Stephanie Courtney as Alex
- Annabelle Gurwitch as Sarah
- Matt Price as Joey
- David Cross as Seminar Leader
- Maura Tierney as Leslie
- Kathleen Roll as Waitress
- Jacqueline Heinze as Rita
- Laura Kightlinger as Laura
- Fred Armisen as Vesa
- Jerry Minor as Solly
- James Gunn as Scott

In addition to the director Bob Odenkirk acting in the role of Keith, a number of notable people appeared in minor roles in the film, including Jenna Fischer, B. J. Porter, Tucker Smallwood, Wendy Rae Fowler, Jason Nash, Scott Aukerman, Scott Adsit, Nathan Odenkirk (son of Bob and Naomi Odenkirk), Allan Havey, as well as the uncredited Jack Black and Melora Walters. Additionally Daisy Gardner, Marc Evan Jackson, Ron Lynch, Annie Mumolo, Joe Nunez, Bill Odenkirk, the Sklar Brothers, Derek Waters, Suzanne Whang, and Kristen Wiig appear as extras.

== Production ==
Michael Penn wrote the music for the film. The film won the Audience Award at the 2003 South by Southwest Film Festival and the Best Picture and Best Ensemble Awards at the Phoenix Film Festival.

The movie uses many actors who are mainliners in other television productions, such as Odenkirk's former Mr. Show co-star David Cross as a self-help seminar leader. However, the main characters are all played by the stage actors who performed in the Los Angeles stage production on which the screenplay is based.

Odenkirk also directed a short film that was included on the Melvin Goes to Dinner DVD release, The Frank International Film Festival. It portrayed the screening of Melvin Goes to Dinner at a (fictional) film festival organized by a cinephile named Frank (Fred Armisen) who hosts the festival at the home he shares with his mother.

== Reception ==
On Rotten Tomatoes, Melvin Goes to Dinner has an approval rating of 100% based on 12 reviews.

Marjorie Baumgarten of The Austin Chronicle wrote Odenkirk "shows real skill with the gradual manner in which he allows this story to evolve", and that the "movie should inspire viewers to call up old friends, order a bottle of wine, and talk the night away."
