= Between Two Ferns with Zach Galifianakis =

American comedy talk show

- Genre: Comedy, talk show, satire
- Created by: Scott Aukerman; B. J. Porter
- Directed by: Ruben Fleischer; Daniel Strange; Scott Aukerman; B. J. Porter
- Presented by: Zach Galifianakis
- Theme music composer: Bernard Hermann
- Opening theme: "Theme from Taxi Driver (Reprise)"
- Country of origin: United States
- Original language: English
- No. of episodes: 21 (and 1 special)

Production
- Executive producers: Mike Farah; Scott Aukerman; B. J. Porter
- Producers: B. J. Porter; Scott Aukerman; Christin Trogan; Zach Galifianakis; Anna Wenger; Corinne Eckhart
- Production locations: Los Angeles, U.S.
- Cinematography: Brian Murray; Matt Sweeney; Matt Krueger
- Editors: Daniel Strange; Caleb Emerson; Mordecai Druitt; Hank Friedmann
- Camera setup: Multi-camera
- Running time: 3–6 minutes
- Production company: Comedy Bang! Bang!

Original release
- Network: Funny or Die
- Release: January 4, 2008 – June 14, 2018

Between Two Ferns with Zach Galifianakis is a satirical American talk show web series hosted by comedian Zach Galifianakis which features celebrity guests. Episodes last several minutes, in which the interviewer (Galifianakis) and guests trade barbs and insults. In addition to the online series, there is a Comedy Central television special, and a Netflix original movie Between Two Ferns: The Movie.

== Format ==
Host Zach Galifianakis interviews celebrities while sitting between two potted ferns. The set intentionally resembles a low-budget amateur production for public-access television, with on-screen graphics containing deliberate comedic errors. For example, in a 2014 episode, Brad Pitt's name is spelled "Bart Pit" and his film 12 Years a Slave—the winner of the 2013 Academy Award for Best Picture—entitled "12 Years a Salve".

Galifianakis maintains a very awkward and often antagonistic demeanor with his guests, asking them bizarre, inappropriate or insulting questions mixed with offhand non-sequiturs. The guests' responses are mostly improvised. Episodes often include a segment in which Galifianakis awkwardly interrupts his guests to promote a sponsor's product. Examples include bananas, the video game Need for Speed: Shift, and (most frequently) Speed Stick deodorant. Some advertisements, like the graphics, are based around aspects of or events related to the interviewee. For example, the episode featuring Hillary Clinton included one of Donald Trump's campaign commercials.

== History and reception ==
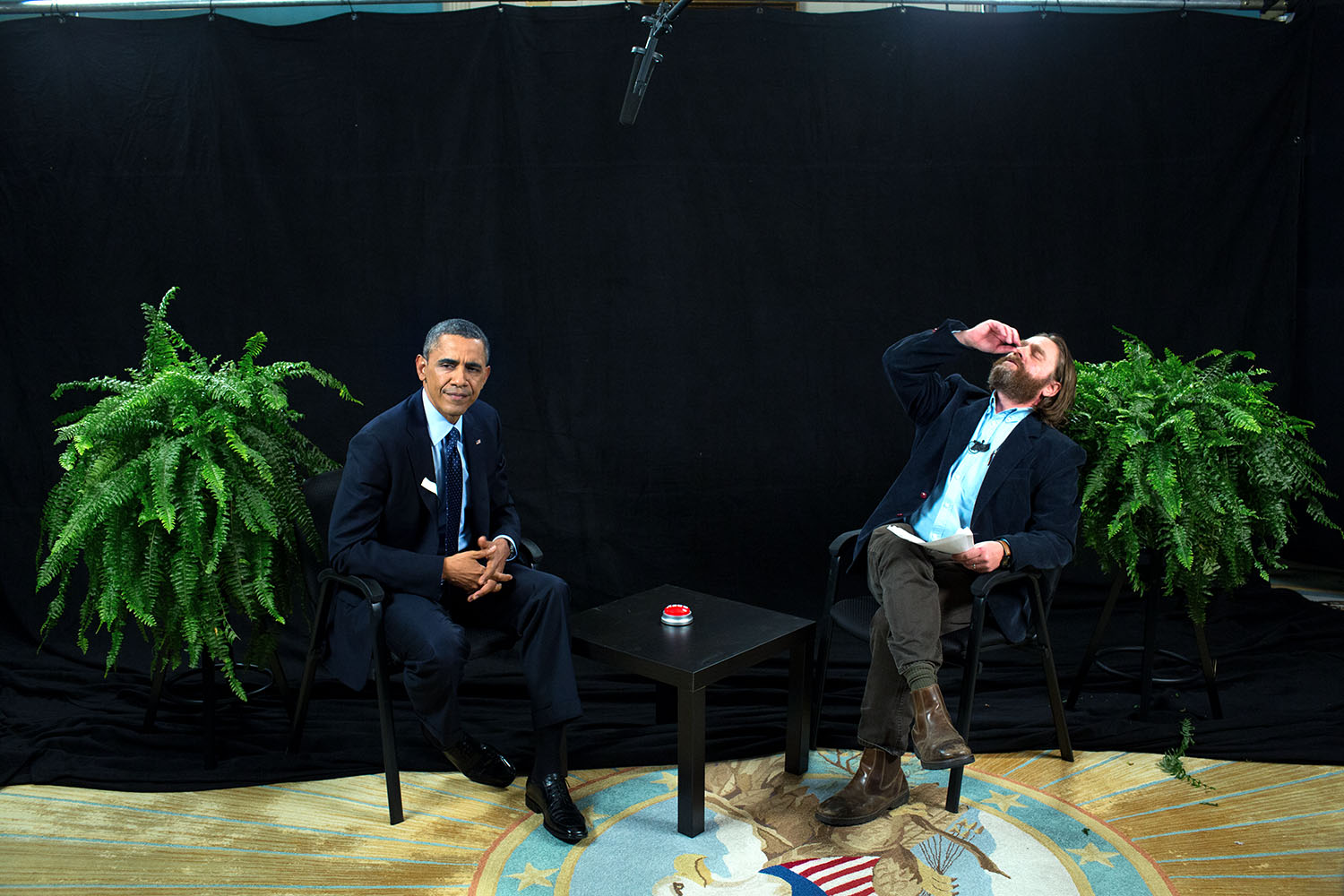
Barack Obama interviewed on Between Two Ferns with Zach Galifianakis, 2014

The show originated as a short film on Scott Aukerman and B. J. Porter's Fox sketch pilot The Right Now! Show, a spin-off of their Comedy Death-Ray live show. After the network declined to pick up the show, the duo put the short up on the website Funny Or Die, where it made a successful transition to an internet series.

Discussing the show on ABC News Now, Galifianakis said, "The sycophantic way that Hollywood machine runs – it's fun to make fun of it. That's how Between Two Ferns started." Guests are not told what will happen in advance, according to Galifianakis, "They agree to come. There is no discussion beforehand...It just happens, no real prep, no organization whatsoever." He continues, "Inappropriateness is really fun to me...That is kind of the take on Between Two Ferns – inappropriate humor."

The Chicago Tribune described it as "surreal improv...a talk show that's more of a charming critique of the faked intimacy of celebrity interviews than a talk show."

A 30-minute television special, Between Two Ferns: A Fairytale of New York, aired on Comedy Central on May 6, 2012. The show featured interviews with Tina Fey, Jon Stewart, and Richard Branson.

The episode featuring President Barack Obama was timed to encourage Americans to sign up for health insurance at Healthcare.gov. Funnyordie.com became the top referrer to the government site during this time. The September 2013 episode featuring Justin Bieber also received significant media attention. The show opened with Galifianakis telling him, "It's really exciting to talk to you. Especially right in the middle of your public meltdown."

In the 2014 episode featuring Brad Pitt, the actor was referred to as both "Bradley Pitts" and "Bart Pit", and Galifianakis referred to Pitt's latest film, Fury as "Furry", and asked Pitt, "Is it hard for you to maintain a suntan...because you live in your wife's shadow?" Galifianakis also asked Pitt if his relationship with wife, Angelina Jolie, was anything like "Ross and Rachel" from Friends, the show that made a star of Pitt's ex-wife, Jennifer Aniston.

In a January 2016 interview with the Los Angeles Times, while promoting Baskets, Galifianakis discussed the status of Between Two Ferns, stating: "I don't know what else to do ... [Between Two Ferns has] kind of run its course a bit." Galifianakis also expressed his desire to interview the Pope on the show. Between Two Ferns' first new episode in almost two years aired in September 2016. It featured then-presidential candidate Hillary Clinton and received over 30 million views in its first 24 hours, the highest viewership in FunnyorDie.com's history.

Between Two Ferns: The Movie, a film adaptation of the show directed by Aukerman and written by Galifianakis and Aukerman, premiered on Netflix on September 20, 2019. Uncut interviews from the film featuring David Letterman, Paul Rudd, Awkwafina, Benedict Cumberbatch, Brie Larson, Keanu Reeves, Hailee Steinfeld, and Adam Scott were released on the Netflix Is A Joke YouTube channel and FunnyOrDie.com under the title Between Two Ferns with Zach Galifianakis: The Movie, Sorta Uncut Interviews, which was nominated for the 2020 Primetime Emmy Award for Outstanding Short Form Variety Series.

== Episodes ==
| No. | Title | Guest(s) | Directed by | Original release date |
|---|---|---|---|---|
| 1 | "Michael Cera" | Michael Cera | Ruben Fleischer | January 4, 2008 |
| 2 | "Jimmy Kimmel" | Jimmy Kimmel | Ruben Fleischer | April 17, 2008 |
| 3 | "Jon Hamm" | Jon Hamm | Daniel Strange | December 12, 2008 |
| 4 | "Natalie Portman" | Natalie Portman | Daniel Strange | May 6, 2009 |
| 5 | "Bradley Cooper" | Bradley Cooper and Carrot Top | Daniel Strange | May 25, 2009 |
| 6 | "Charlize Theron" | Charlize Theron | Scott Aukerman | September 7, 2009 |
| 7 | "Conan O'Brien and Andy Richter" | Conan O'Brien, Andy Richter and Andy Dick | Scott Aukerman | November 16, 2009 |
| 8 | "Ben Stiller" | Ben Stiller | Daniel Strange | March 16, 2010 |
| 9 | "Steve Carell" | Steve Carell | B.J. Porter | July 27, 2010 |
| 10 | "Sean Penn" | Sean Penn | Scott Aukerman | August 31, 2010 |
| 11 | "Bruce Willis" | Bruce Willis | Scott Aukerman | October 12, 2010 |
| 12 | "Jennifer Aniston and Tila Tequila" | Tila Tequila and Jennifer Aniston | B.J. Porter | February 8, 2011 |
| 13 | "Will Ferrell and Jon Hamm" | Will Ferrell and Jon Hamm | Scott Aukerman | May 22, 2011 |
| 14 | "Oscar Buzz Edition Part 1" | Jennifer Lawrence, Naomi Watts, Christoph Waltz, Anne Hathaway and Amy Adams | Ruben Fleischer | February 11, 2013 |
| 15 | "Oscar Buzz Edition Part 2" | Jessica Chastain, Sally Field, Emmanuel Lewis, and Bradley Cooper | Scott Aukerman | February 12, 2013 |
| 16 | "James Franco" | James Franco, Edward Norton, and The Lonely Island | Scott Aukerman | May 7, 2013 |
| 17 | "Justin Bieber" | Justin Bieber | Scott Aukerman | September 26, 2013 |
| N–A | "Happy Holidays Edition" | Tobey Maguire, Samuel L. Jackson, and Arcade Fire | Scott Aukerman | December 18, 2013 |
| 18 | "President Barack Obama" | President Barack Obama | Scott Aukerman | March 11, 2014 |
| 19 | "Brad Pitt" | Brad Pitt and Louis C.K. | Scott Aukerman | October 22, 2014 |
| 20 | "Hillary Clinton" | Hillary Clinton | Scott Aukerman | September 22, 2016 |
| 21 | "Jerry Seinfeld & Cardi B" | Jerry Seinfeld, Wayne Knight and Cardi B | Scott Aukerman | June 14, 2018 |

=== Special (2012) ===
A special episode aired on television on Comedy Central on May 6, 2012.

| Title | Guests | Directed by | Original release date |
|---|---|---|---|
| "Between Two Ferns: A Fairytale of New York" | Tina Fey, Jon Stewart, and Richard Branson | Scott Aukerman | May 6, 2012 |

== Awards ==
| Awards | Category | Nominees | Result |
|---|---|---|---|
| 2013 Creative Arts Emmy Award | Outstanding Short-Format Live-Action Entertainment Program | Mike Farah, Scott Aukerman, Zach Galifianakis, B. J. Porter, Anna Wenger, Betsy Koch | Nominated |
| 2014 Creative Arts Emmy Award | Outstanding Short-Format Live-Action Entertainment Program | Scott Aukerman, Zach Galifianakis, B. J. Porter, Mike Farah, Sean Boyle, Rachel Goldenberg | Won |
| 2015 Creative Arts Emmy Award | Outstanding Short-Format Live-Action Entertainment Program | Mike Farah, Scott Aukerman, Zach Galifianakis, B. J. Porter, Sean Boyle, Michelle Fox | Won |
