= Bob Odenkirk =

American actor and screenwriter (born 1962)

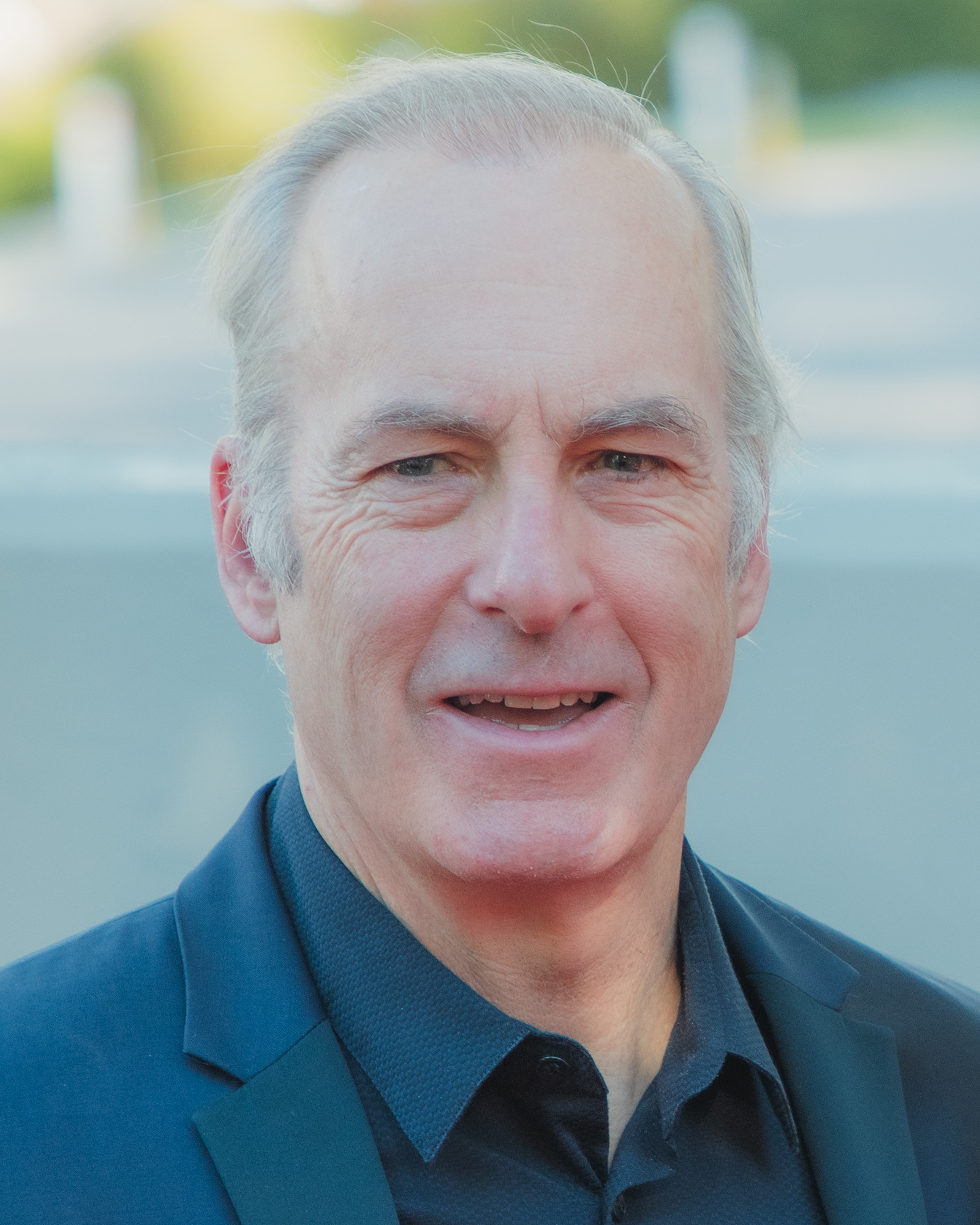
- Odenkirk in 2026
- Born: Robert John Odenkirk; October 22, 1962 (age 64); Berwyn, Illinois, U.S.
- Education: Southern Illinois University Carbondale (BA)
- Occupations: Actor; screenwriter; comedian; producer
- Years active: 1987–present
- Works: Full list
- Spouse: Naomi Yomtov (m. 1997)
- Children: 2
- Relatives: Bill Odenkirk (brother)
- Awards: Full list
- Website: bobodenkirk.com

Robert John Odenkirk (/ˈoʊdənkɜːrk/; born October 22, 1962) is an American actor, screenwriter, comedian, and producer. His accolades include two Primetime Emmy Awards (out of 18 nominations) and three Critics' Choice Television Awards, in addition to nominations for five Golden Globe Awards and a Tony Award.

Odenkirk started his career writing for Saturday Night Live (1987–1991), going on to write and act in The Ben Stiller Show (1992), winning an Emmy Award for Outstanding Writing for a Variety Series in 1989 and 1993. He also wrote for Late Night with Conan O'Brien (1993–1994) and acted in a recurring role as Agent Stevie Grant in the HBO comedy series The Larry Sanders Show (1993–1998). He created and starred in the seminal HBO sketch comedy series Mr. Show with Bob and David (1995–1998) with David Cross. Odenkirk and Cross reteamed for the Netflix sketch series W/ Bob & David (2015).

As a dramatic actor, Odenkirk gained recognition and acclaim for playing Saul Goodman/Jimmy McGill on Breaking Bad (2009–2013) and its spin-off Better Call Saul (2015–2022). For the latter, he received six nominations for the Primetime Emmy Award for Outstanding Lead Actor in a Drama Series. He also starred as Bill Oswalt in the first season of the FX anthology series Fargo (2014) and earned a nomination for the Primetime Emmy Award for Outstanding Guest Actor in a Comedy Series for his role in The Bear (2024).

Odenkirk made his directorial feature debut with Melvin Goes to Dinner (2003) followed by Let's Go to Prison (2006), and The Brothers Solomon (2007), and also wrote Run Ronnie Run! (2002), and Girlfriend's Day (2017). He took supporting roles in films such as Nebraska (2013), The Post (2017), Incredibles 2 (2018), and Little Women (2019). He starred in the action films Nobody (2021) and its sequel, Nobody 2 (2025), both of which he also produced. On stage, he received a nomination for the Tony Award for Best Featured Actor in a Play with his Broadway debut in Glengarry Glen Ross (2025).

== Early life and education ==
Robert John Odenkirk was born in Berwyn, Illinois, then raised in Naperville. He is the second oldest of seven siblings born to Walter Henry Odenkirk (1930–1986), who was employed in the printing business, and Barbara Mary (née Baier) Odenkirk (1936–2021), Catholics of German and Irish descent. His parents divorced in part due to Walter's alcoholism, which influenced Bob's decision to avoid alcohol as much as possible. He describes his father as "remote, fucked-up, and not around". Odenkirk later said that he grew up "hating" Naperville as a 15-year-old because "it felt like a dead end, like Nowheresville. I couldn't wait to move into a city and be around people who were doing exciting things." Walter Odenkirk died of bone cancer in 1986. Odenkirk's younger brother Bill Odenkirk is also a comedy writer, and helped Bob's early career.

Odenkirk attended Naperville North High School and graduated at 16; he was "tired of high school", and because he had enough credits, he was able to leave high school when he was still a junior. Because he was so young and thought he would be awkward at any college, he decided to attend the local College of DuPage in Glen Ellyn, Illinois. After a year, he went to Marquette University in Milwaukee, Wisconsin, then transferred to Southern Illinois University in Carbondale, Illinois, "honing his sketch-writing and performance skills with live shows on both colleges' radio stations". He began his foray into comedy writing as a radio DJ for WIDB, the local non-broadcast college station at SIU. At WIDB he created a late-night (midnight to 4 am) radio comedy show called The Prime Time Special. After three years of college, Odenkirk was three credits short of graduating when he decided to try writing and improv in Chicago. He completed the credits at Columbia College Chicago and received his bachelor's degree in communications from SIU in 1984. First studying with Del Close, Odenkirk attended the Players Workshop where he met Robert Smigel, and they began a collaboration that would last for years and take Odenkirk to Saturday Night Live. He also performed at the Improv Olympic alongside future Saturday Night Live cast members Chris Farley and Tim Meadows.

Odenkirk sharpened his stand-up and improv skills at Elmhurst's now defunct Who's on First comedy club, then part of The Steve and Leo Show.

Odenkirk visited Chicago's Second City Theater at the age of fourteen. He said his strongest comedic influence was Monty Python's Flying Circus, primarily due to its combination of cerebral humor and silliness, which Odenkirk characterized as "laugh-out-loud" humor. Other influences included radio personality Steve Dahl, SCTV, Steve Martin's Let's Get Small, Woody Allen, The Credibility Gap, and Bob and Ray.

== Career ==
=== 1987–1999: Saturday Night Live and Mr. Show ===
Odenkirk was hired as a writer at Saturday Night Live in 1987 and worked there through 1991. Working alongside Robert Smigel and Conan O'Brien, he contributed to many sketches they created but felt uncertain of the efficacy of his writing at the show. When SNL took its 1988 summer break, Odenkirk returned to Chicago to perform a stage show with Smigel and O'Brien, titled Happy Happy Good Show. The following summer he did a one-man show, Show-Acting Guy, directed by Tom Gianas. During his final summer hiatus, he wrote and acted in the Second City Mainstage show, Flag Burning Permitted in Lobby Only. In that particular show, he wrote the character "Matt Foley, Motivational Speaker" for Chris Farley, which would later be reprised on SNL.

He acted in several small roles on the show, most visibly during a 1990 parody commercial for Bad Idea Jeans. During his final year at SNL, he worked alongside Adam Sandler, David Spade, Chris Rock and Chris Farley, but eventually he decided to leave the show in order to pursue performing. He has credited SNL with teaching him many lessons about sketch writing, from senior writers like Jim Downey and Al Franken, as well as his friends Smigel and O'Brien. In 1991, Odenkirk relocated to Los Angeles and was hired to write for the TV show Get a Life, which starred Late Night with David Letterman alumnus Chris Elliott. He wrote for The Dennis Miller Show.

Odenkirk's friendship with Ben Stiller, with whom he briefly shared an office at SNL, would lead to his being hired for the cast of The Ben Stiller Show in 1992. Working as both a writer and actor on the show, he created and starred in the memorable sketch "Manson Lassie", and helped the show win an Emmy Award for writing. However, the show had already been canceled by the time it won the award. Odenkirk served as a writer on Late Night with Conan O'Brien for the show's 1993 and 1994 seasons. Odenkirk met David Cross at Ben Stiller; shortly afterward, the pair began performing live sketch shows, which eventually evolved into Mr. Show with Bob and David. In 1993, Odenkirk began a recurring role on The Larry Sanders Show as Larry Sanders' agent, Stevie Grant. He would continue the character through 1998. Also in 1993, he had brief acting roles on Roseanne and Tom Arnold's The Jackie Thomas Show. Odenkirk's first movie roles were very minor parts in films such as Wayne's World 2, The Cable Guy, Can't Stop Dancing and Monkeybone. Odenkirk briefly attempted a stand-up career in the mid-1990s, but abandoned it soon after, admitting he "hated telling the same joke twice."

Created by Odenkirk and David Cross, Mr. Show ran on HBO for four seasons. The series featured a number of comedians in the early stages of their careers, including Sarah Silverman, Paul F. Tompkins, Jack Black, Tom Kenny, Mary Lynn Rajskub, Brian Posehn and Scott Aukerman. While nominated for multiple Emmy awards in writing and generally well-liked by critics, it never broke out of a "cult" audience into larger mainstream acceptance due to being a premium cable show. After Mr. Show, Bob and David and the writers from the staff wrote the movie Run, Ronnie, Run. The film was an extension of a sketch from the show's first season. However, the studio took production control away from Cross and Odenkirk during the editing stages, and the pair disowned the final product.

=== 2000–2008: After Mr. Show ===
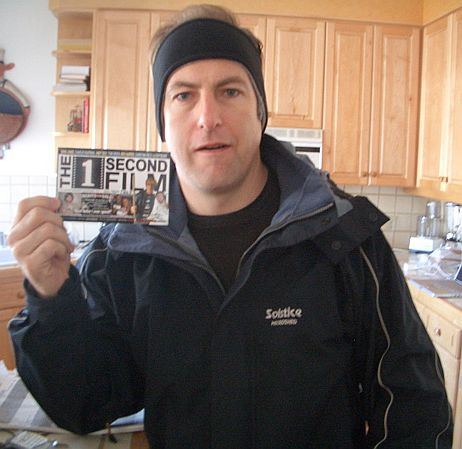
Odenkirk in January 2005

Odenkirk starred in numerous television shows and some films. He has written and produced many TV pilots, including The Big Wide World of Carl Laemke and David's Situation, but most didn't make it to air and none were picked up as a series. In 2003, Odenkirk directed Melvin Goes to Dinner and played the role of Keith. The film received positive reviews from critics and won the Audience Award at the SXSW Film and Music Festival.

In 2004, Odenkirk received an unsolicited package including the work of Tim Heidecker and Eric Wareheim. Inspired by their unique voice, he connected with them and helped them develop a semi-animated show for Adult Swim called Tom Goes to the Mayor. He assisted Tim and Eric with the development of their second series, Tim and Eric Awesome Show, Great Job. He had several small featuring roles on TV shows, including Everybody Loves Raymond, Dr. Katz, Professional Therapist, NewsRadio, Just Shoot Me!, Joey, Curb Your Enthusiasm (Season 1, Episode 3), Arrested Development, Entourage, Weeds, and How I Met Your Mother.

Odenkirk was considered for the role of Michael Scott in the pilot of The Office, a role that ultimately went to Steve Carell. Odenkirk finally guested in the final season of The Office as a Philadelphia manager strongly reminiscent of Michael Scott. In 2006, Odenkirk directed Let's Go to Prison, which was written by Thomas Lennon and Robert Ben Garant, and starred Will Arnett, Dax Shepard and Chi McBride. The film received a 12% "All Critics" score from the website Rotten Tomatoes and had a total box office gross of a little more than US$4.6 million. The following year Odenkirk directed The Brothers Solomon, written by Will Forte and starring Forte, Will Arnett and Kristen Wiig. The film received a 15% "All Critics" score from Rotten Tomatoes and had a total box office gross of approximately $1 million.

=== 2009–2013: Breaking Bad ===
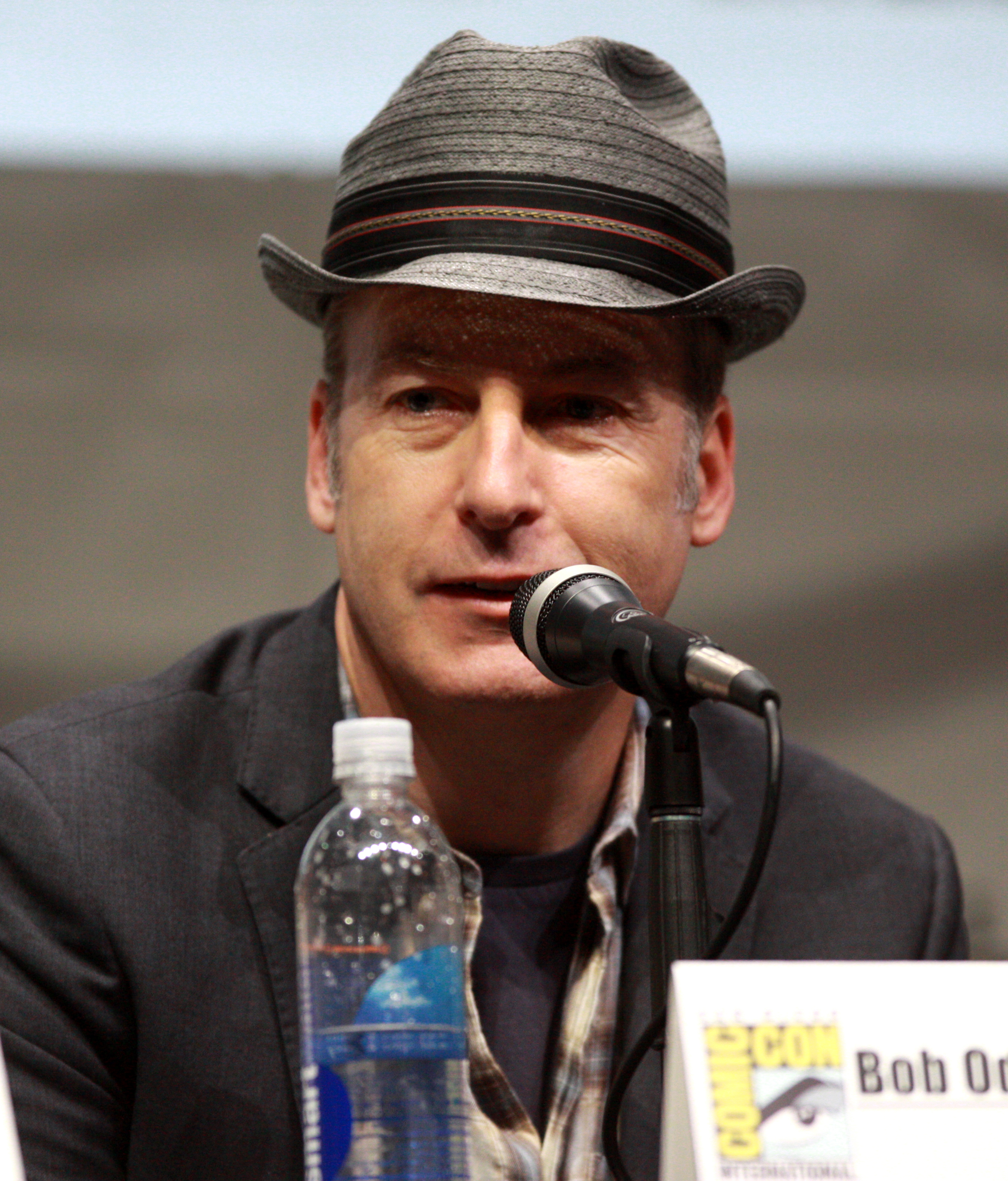
Odenkirk at the 2013 San Diego Comic-Con

In 2009, Odenkirk joined the cast of AMC's Breaking Bad as corrupt lawyer Saul Goodman. Writer Peter Gould, as well as several others, had been quickly drawn to Odenkirk for this role based on his Mr. Show performances. The Goodman role was intended to be only a three-episode guest spot in the second season, but Odenkirk's performance led Gould and Vince Gilligan to extend the character as an ongoing role. Odenkirk became a series regular as Goodman for the show's third through fifth and final season.

In 2011, Odenkirk wrote and developed Let's Do This! for Adult Swim, starring Cal Mackenzie-Goldberg a "two-bit movie mogul and head of Cal-Gold Pictures as he leads a collection of crazy, fame-hungry strivers chasing Hollywood dreams". The pilot can be seen on Adult Swim's website. Odenkirk executive produced the sketch comedy show The Birthday Boys, which starred the comedy group of the same name. Odenkirk also appeared in and directed a number of the sketches on the show. It premiered on IFC on October 18, 2013. In 2014, Odenkirk played Police Chief Bill Oswalt in FX's miniseries Fargo. In fall of 2014, Odenkirk played Dr. Stork, a podiatrist who specializes in cutting off people's toes, in Adult Swim's anthology series Tim & Eric's Bedtime Stories.

After starring in Breaking Bad, Odenkirk began to have more prominent roles in critically successful films, such as Incredibles 2, Little Women, The Post, The Disaster Artist, The Spectacular Now, which received the Special Jury Award for Acting at the 2013 Sundance Film Festival, and the Alexander Payne-directed Nebraska, which was nominated for a Palme d'Or at the 2013 Cannes Film Festival.

=== 2015–2022: Better Call Saul and Nobody ===
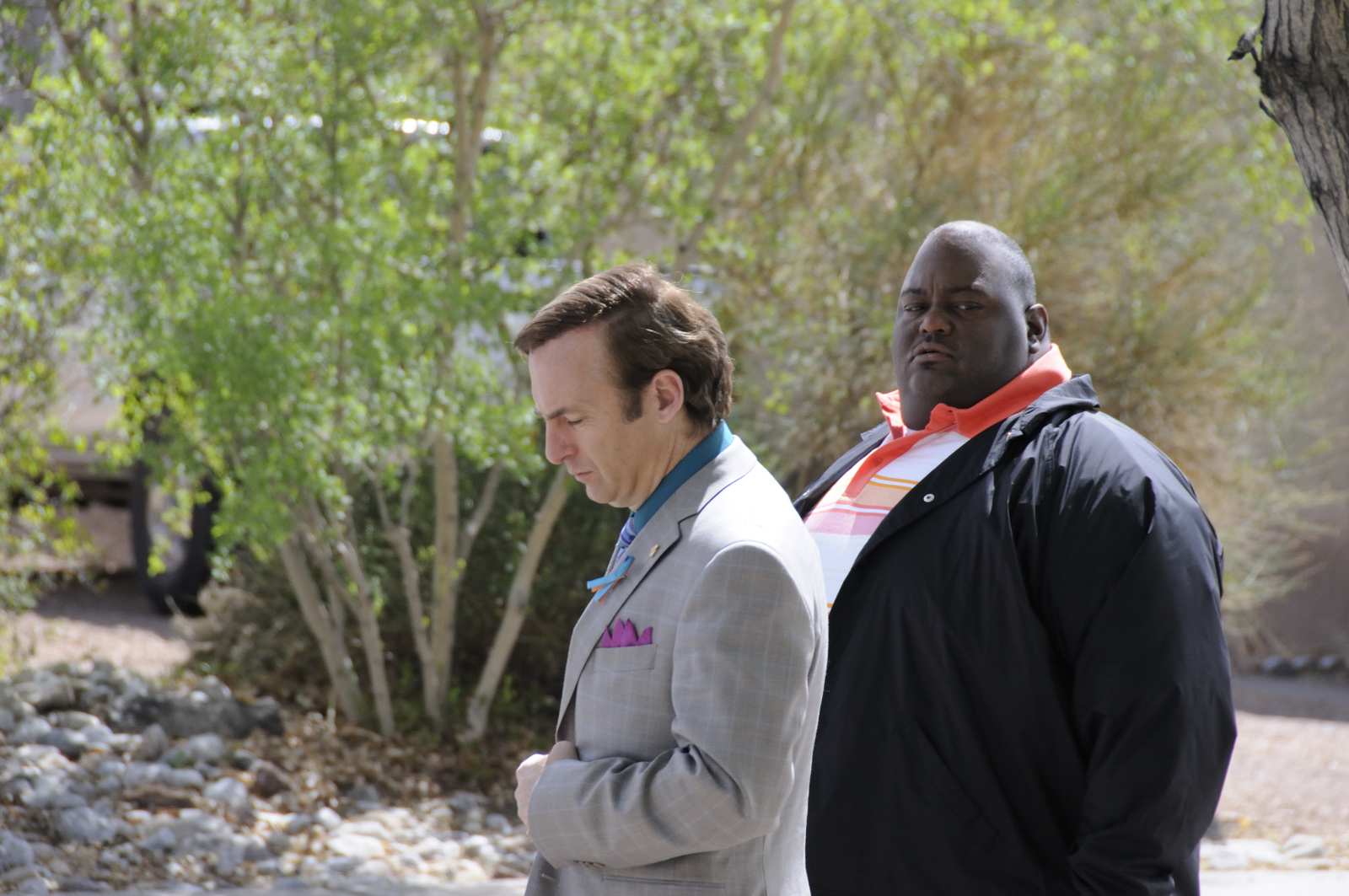
Odenkirk (left) and Lavell Crawford as Saul Goodman and Huell Babineaux during the filming of the fourth season of Breaking Bad

It was reported in April 2015 that Odenkirk was teaming with former co-star David Cross to produce a new sketch comedy series based on their previous production, Mr. Show, called W/ Bob and David. The series was commissioned by Netflix with the first season having been released in November 2015, featuring four 30-minute-long episodes, along with an hour-long behind-the-scenes special. Odenkirk and Cross both write, star in, and produce the show. Odenkirk has expressed interest in doing more seasons.

Odenkirk starred in the title role of Better Call Saul, a Breaking Bad spinoff. Primarily set in the early 2000s, years before the character's debut in Breaking Bad, the series follows lawyer Saul Goodman's journey from court-appointed defense attorney origins to his eventual status as a successful, though unscrupulous, criminal defense lawyer. He is also credited as a producer for the series.

The first season consists of ten 47-minute-long episodes, with a second and third season of ten episodes apiece following in early 2016 and 2017, respectively. The fourth season was available on Netflix as of August 6, 2018, and the fifth season premiered on AMC on February 23, 2020. The show's final sixth season, which started production in February 2020 but was delayed due to COVID-19, started airing on April 18, 2022.

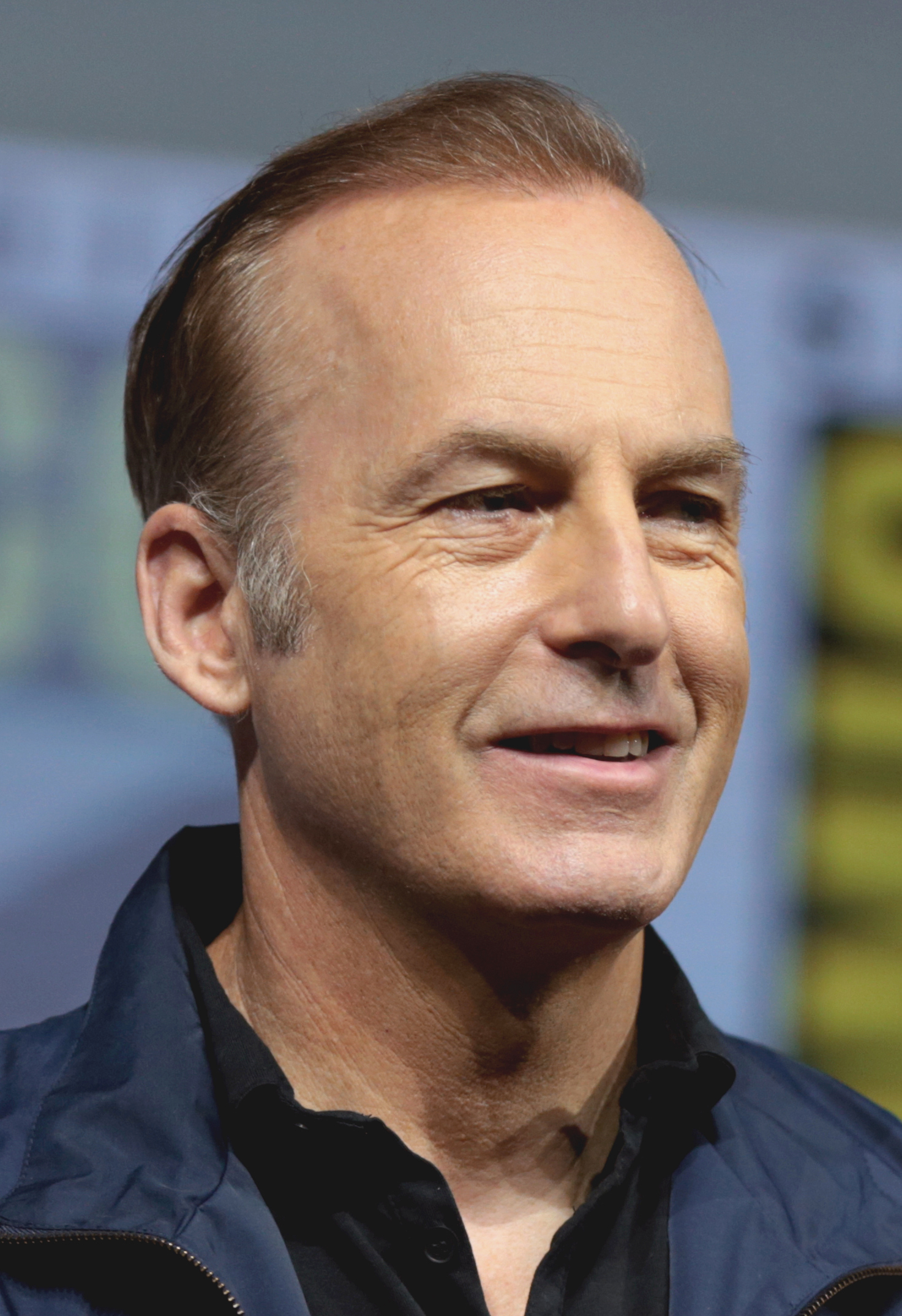
Odenkirk in 2018

In 2017, Odenkirk published his first book, A Load of Hooey, a collection of comedic sketches and essays. Odenkirk co-wrote, produced, and starred in Girlfriend's Day, a Netflix original film. This film-noir comedy about a greeting card writer was directed by Michael Stephenson and influenced by Chinatown. It was a movie Odenkirk had wanted to make for 16 years, after Mr. Show writer Eric Hoffman sent him the original script and they began developing it. In April 2020, with the end of Better Call Saul in sight, Odenkirk established his own production company Cal-Gold Pictures, with former Comedy Central vice president Ian Friedman as head of television, and signed a first-look deal with Sony Pictures Television.

In March 2021, Odenkirk starred as Hutch Mansell in the action-thriller film Nobody, which opened at number one at the US box office, with $6.7 million in ticket sales. To prepare for his role in Nobody, Odenkirk underwent an intensive two-year physical training program focused on developing functional strength, mobility, and combat conditioning. His regimen began with regular cardio warm-ups, such as cycling for 10–15 minutes, followed by high-volume circuit training consisting of box jumps, push-ups, squats, and abdominal exercises. He also incorporated pull-ups and boxing drills, performing multiple three-minute rounds of pad work to improve striking skill and endurance. Odenkirk's trainer and stunt team, including Daniel Bernhardt of John Wick fame, designed the sessions to prioritise movement efficiency and coordination over heavy lifting, reflecting a focus on practical combat readiness rather than traditional bodybuilding strength, so he could, as Bernhardt put it, perform "99 percent of his own stunts."

Odenkirk received his star on the Hollywood Walk of Fame on April 18, 2022, the date of the premiere of the final season of Better Call Saul. Odenkirk's star is located next to the star of his Breaking Bad co-star Bryan Cranston. In 2022, a new series starring Odenkirk was announced for AMC, entitled Lucky Hank, based on the novel Straight Man by Richard Russo. It premiered on March 19, 2023. In 2022, Odenkirk published his memoir, Comedy Comedy Comedy Drama. This was followed by a collection of children's poetry in 2023, Zilot & Other Important Rhymes, written with his daughter, Erin.

=== 2023–present ===
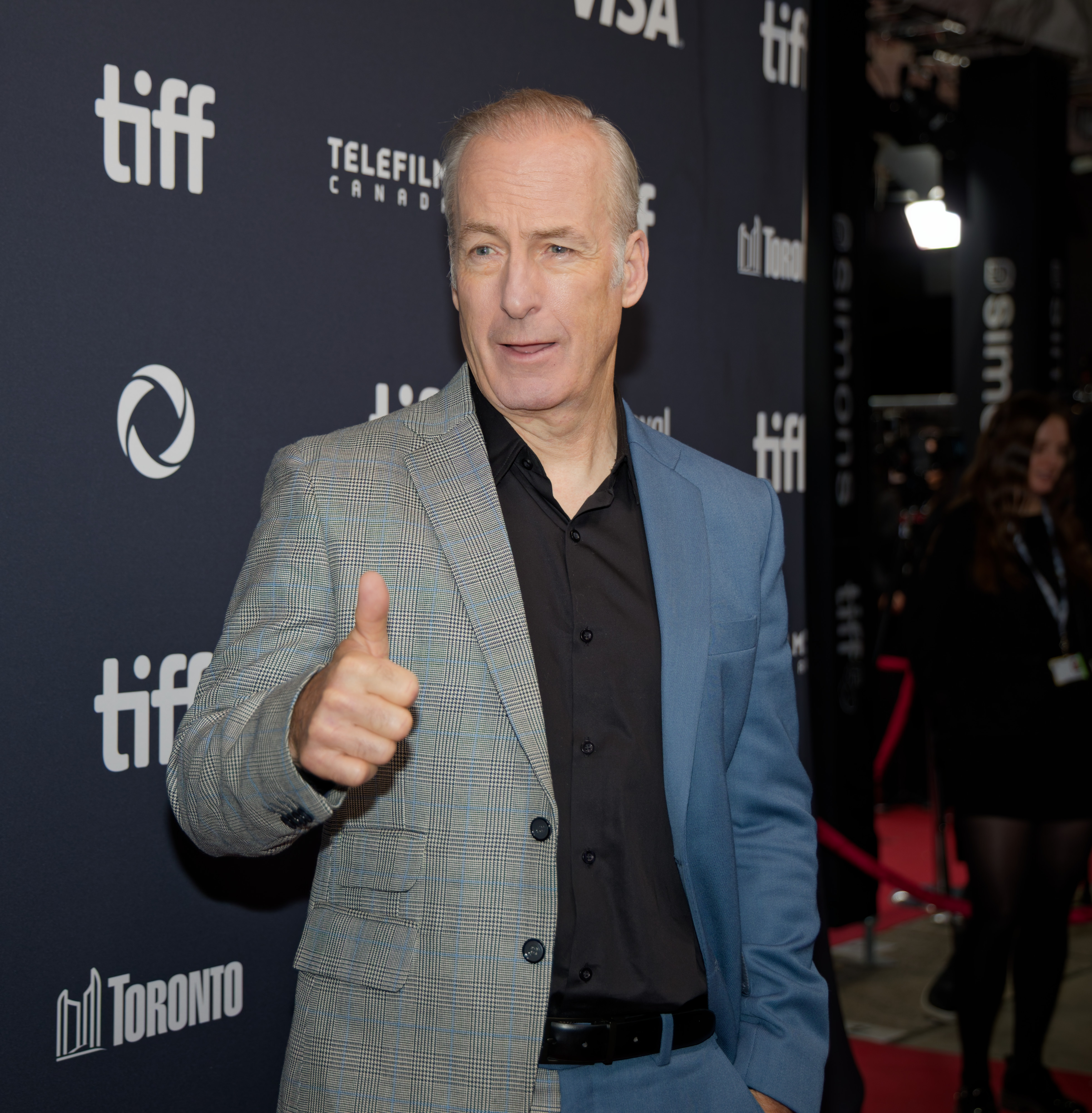
Odenkirk at the 2025 Toronto International Film Festival for Normal

In 2023, Odenkirk acted in the FX series The Bear playing Uncle Lee in the episode "Fishes". The performance earned him a nomination for the Primetime Emmy Award for Outstanding Guest Actor in a Comedy Series. In 2025, Odenkirk made his Broadway debut as Shelly Levene in a revival of the David Mamet play Glengarry Glen Ross, headlining opposite Kieran Culkin and Bill Burr. Odenkirk's performance was critically acclaimed and earned a nomination for the Tony Award for Best Featured Actor in a Play, marking the polarizing revival's sole nomination.

In Normal (2025), he plays Ulysses, a substitute sheriff uncovering dangerous secrets in a sleepy town that has a crooked mayor. The screenplay is by Derek Kolstad and runs in the same vein as the Nobody films.

Odenkirk appeared as the lead character of Johnny in The Room Returns!, a remake of the infamously bad 2003 film The Room, in 2025.

At the 2025 NFL Honors, Odenkirk heckled actor and host Jon Hamm as a part of a bit where he played the "Chicago Pope", a reference to Pope Leo XIV.

== Personal life ==
In the early 1990s, Odenkirk was linked romantically to fellow comedian, actress and writer Janeane Garofalo, who introduced him to Mr. Show with Bob and David co-creator David Cross.

In 1997, Odenkirk married Naomi Yomtov, who was later the executive producer of W/ Bob and David. They have two children, a son and a daughter.

During the first season of Better Call Saul, Odenkirk would live in an Albuquerque condominium previously owned by Breaking Bad co-star Bryan Cranston. Odenkirk and his wife would eventually buy a house in Albuquerque, where Odenkirk would live with cast members Rhea Seehorn and Patrick Fabian during principal photography. Odenkirk stated that this was for the actors to keep each other company after filming had finished for the day, as he had lived by himself during the first season and felt a sense of loneliness when he was home. All of the actors and their spouses knew of and were friends with one another, so all parties were content with the living arrangement. Other recurring character actors such as Josh Fadem would stay at that house when it came time to film their scenes in Albuquerque.

When discussing costume choices on Better Call Saul, Odenkirk stated he has partial color blindness and that he leaves costume selection for his roles to the costume department.

On December 15, 2019, Odenkirk's alma mater SIU announced it had awarded him the honorary degree of Doctor of Performing Arts.

On July 27, 2021, Odenkirk was hospitalized in Albuquerque after having what he described as a "small heart attack" on the set of the sixth season of Better Call Saul. Three days later, on July 30, Odenkirk reported that he would "be back soon", and on September 8 he reported he had returned to work. In 2022, Odenkirk revealed that he had two stents placed in his coronary arteries shortly after the widow-maker heart attack due to arterial plaque build-up, which he had been diagnosed with in 2018. He also said that his condition was more severe than had initially been understood, disclosing that his heart stopped and he required cardiopulmonary resuscitation and defibrillation to recover a pulse. Better Call Saul showrunner Peter Gould later stated that had Odenkirk not recovered, he and the producers would not have continued on and likely would have dropped the show.

On the PBS show Finding Your Roots, Odenkirk learned that he is descended from an illegitimate son of Frederick Charles, Duke of Schleswig-Holstein-Sonderburg-Plön, making him an eleventh cousin to King Charles III. He also learned one of his ancestors, Jean Jacques Fricker, was a French soldier during the Napoleonic Wars who fought at the Battle of Aspern-Essling.

== Acting credits and accolades ==
As an actor, he is known for his role as Saul Goodman/Jimmy McGill on Breaking Bad (2009–2013) and its spin-off Better Call Saul (2015–2022). For the latter, he received six nominations for the Primetime Emmy Award for Outstanding Lead Actor in a Drama Series, which ties the record for most nominations in the category without a win. For the role, he also received five nominations for the Golden Globe Award for Best Actor – Television Series Drama, five nominations for the Actor Award for Outstanding Performance by a Male Actor in a Drama Series, and six nominations for the Critics' Choice Television Award for Best Actor in a Drama Series, winning the award three times, along with three nominations for the Television Critics Association Award for Individual Achievement in Drama. As a producer on Better Call Saul since its premiere, he has also received seven nominations for the Primetime Emmy Award for Outstanding Drama Series.

== Bibliography ==
Year	Title
2013	Hollywood Said No!: Orphaned Film Scripts, Bastard Scenes, and Abandoned Darlings from the Creators of Mr. Show
2014	A Load of Hooey
2022	Comedy Comedy Comedy Drama: A Memoir
2023	Zilot & Other Important Rhymes
