= Kulap Vilaysack =

American actress

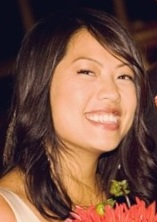
- Vilaysack in 2015
- Born: Kulap Tukta Vilaysack; Washington, D.C., U.S.
- Education: Fashion Institute of Design & Merchandising
- Occupations: Actress; comedian; writer; podcast host
- Years active: 2002–present
- Spouse: Scott Aukerman (m. 2008)
- Children: 1
- Website: kulapvilaysack.com

Kulap Tukta Vilaysack (/ˈkuːlɑːp vɪˈlaɪsɑːk/ KOO-lahp vil-EYE-sahk) is an American actress, comedian, writer, director, and showrunner. She co-hosts the Add To Cart podcast with SuChin Pak on Lemonada Media. She was the co-host of the Who Charted? podcast on the Earwolf network from 2010 until 2018.

== Early life ==
Vilaysack was born in Washington, D.C. after her Laotian parents arrived from a refugee camp in Thailand. Her family soon moved to the Twin Cities, settling in the suburb of Eagan, Minnesota. She has two younger sisters, Anita and Alyssa.

After graduating from high school, Vilaysack moved to Los Angeles where she attended the Fashion Institute of Design & Merchandising and received an associate's degree. She later took classes and performed at the Upright Citizens Brigade Theatre in Los Angeles. She was also a producer of the Los Angeles/Silverlake-based alternative comedy variety show, "Garage Comedy".

== Career ==
Vilaysack's acting work includes a recurring role as "Nurse Kulap" on the Adult Swim series Childrens Hospital. Other television guest appearances include Bob's Burgers, The Office, The Sarah Silverman Program, The Hotwives of Orlando, Parks and Recreation, Happy Endings, Reno 911! and Whitney. In 2007, she briefly worked as an associate producer on America's Got Talent.

With comedian Howard Kremer, she co-hosted the podcast Who Charted? on the Earwolf network from 2010 to 2018.

Vilaysack is the creator and showrunner of the reality show spoof Bajillion Dollar Propertie$, her first time working in this capacity. The show premiered in early 2016 as part of the launch of NBC's streaming platform Seeso. Other executive producers on the project include Scott Aukerman, Robert Ben Garant, and Thomas Lennon.

In October 2020, it was announced that Vilaysack would be joining Lemonada Media's podcast slate as the co-host of the new show Add to Cart alongside former MTV News correspondent SuChin Pak. The podcast launched on November 17, 2020 and is "a subversive and fun way about talking about consumerism, and how we all participate in it."

== Personal life ==
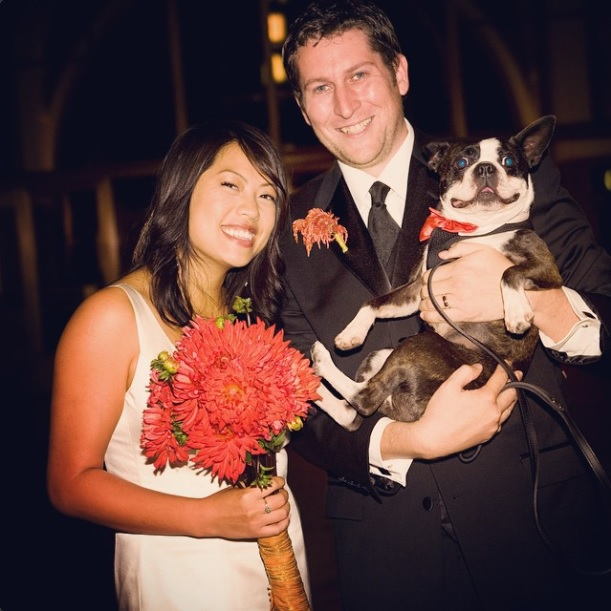
Vilaysack with husband Scott Aukerman (center) and dog (right)

Vilaysack married comedian Scott Aukerman in 2008. In 2022 Vilaysack and Aukerman had a daughter, Emerald.

She directed a documentary about her family tree entitled Origin Story which premiered on Amazon on May 10, 2019. The film incorporates the character Katharsis of The Movement, a superhero based on Vilaysack created by author Gail Simone.

== Filmography ==
Film
Year	Title	Role	Notes
2002	Run Ronnie Run	Gay Female Military Type #2	Uncredited
2009	Spooner	Asian Corporate	
2009	I Love You, Man	Zooey's Friend	
2009	The Goods: Live Hard, Sell Hard	Blowout Customer #2	Uncredited
2010	Peep World	Lily	
2014	Welcome to Me	Grace Dao	
2018	Origin Story	Herself	Documentary; also director and producer

Television
Year	Title	Role	Notes
2004–2005	Asia Street Comedy	Various characters	3 episodes
2006	Fire Guys	Hot Pi	Episode #1.3
2006	The Office	Nikki	Episode: "A Benihana Christmas"
2007	The Very Funny Show	Various / Ian's Date	2 episodes
2007	The Right Now! Show	Various	TV movie
2008–2012	Childrens Hospital	Nurse Kulap / Nurse Sandy / Kulap	8 episodes
2008	The McCaingels	Tze Lan O'Reilly	Series regular
2008	Downer's Grove	Jane	Episode: "Independent Brett"
2008	Brothers & Sisters	Gail	2 episodes
2009	American Contestant with Bob Odenkirk		TV series short
2009	Single Dads	Molly	Episode: "Brian Gets a Girlfriend"
2009	The New Adventures of Old Christine	Nurse	Episode: "The Mole"
2009	Secret Girlfriend	Ling	Episode: "You Get a New Girlfriend"
2009–2020	Reno 911!	Various	5 episodes
2010	The Sarah Silverman Program	Carly	Episode: "A Fairly Attractive Mind"
2010	The Wanda Sykes Show	Staffer #2	Episode #1.18
2010	$#*! My Dad Says	Woman	Episode: "Make a Wish"
2011	Traffic Light	Bartender	2 episodes
2011	Whitney	Waitress	Episode: "Two Broke-Up Guys"
2012	Happy Endings	Nicole	Episode: "To Serb with Love"
2012	Parks and Recreation	Ulani	Episode: "Ben's Parents"
2012–2022	Bob's Burgers	Rupa / various (voice)	4 episodes
2013–2016	Comedy Bang! Bang!	Various	6 episodes
2013	Tiny Commando	Translator Aide	2 episodes
2013	Married Single Divorced Show	Herself	Episode: "Sacking Up with Kulap Vilaysack"
2014	The Hotwives of Orlando	Carmelotta	2 episodes
2014	Rubberhead	Girl 3 (segment "Lisa")	TV movie
2014	BoJack Horseman	Film Crew Assistant (voice)	Episode: "One Trick Pony"
2014	Garfunkel and Oates	Laura	Episode: "Road Warriors"
2016–2017	Love	Rebecca	3 episodes
2016–2019	Bajillion Dollar Propertie$	Cassandra	2 episodes Also creator, executive producer, writer, director
2016–2018	Take My Wife	Danielle	4 episodes
2017	Brooklyn Nine-Nine	Nightmare	Episode: "Crime and Punishment"
2017	Ghosted	Julia	Episode: "Pilot"
2017–2019	I'm Sorry	Corinne	2 episodes
2023–2024	Velma	Lola (voice)	11 episodes
