= Todd Glass =

American comedian (born 1964)

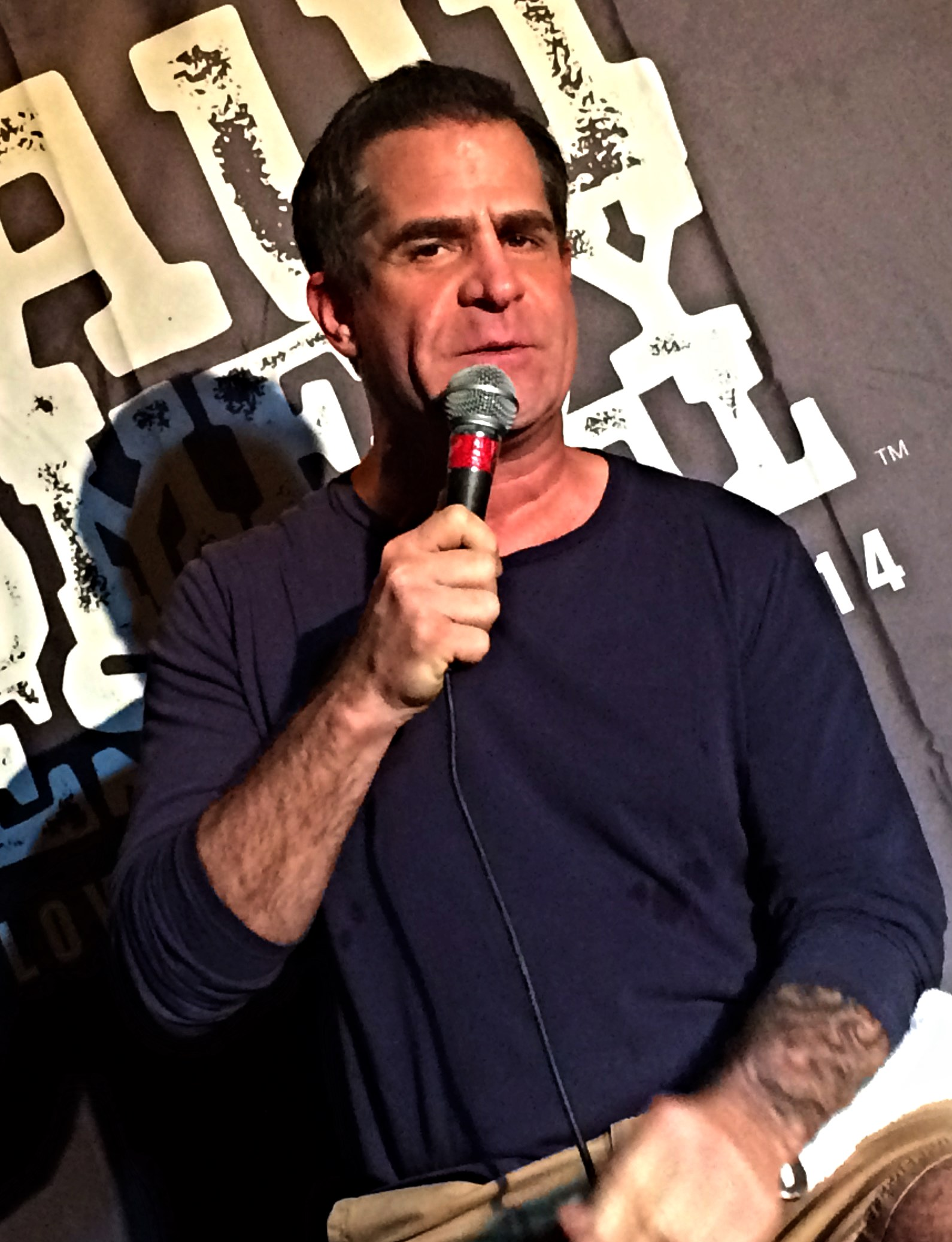
- Glass in 2014
- Born: December 16, 1964 (age 61); Philadelphia, Pennsylvania, U.S.

Comedy career
- Years active: 1982–present
- Medium: Stand-up, television, podcast
- Genres: Observational comedy, surreal humor, alternative comedy, absurd
- Subjects: American culture, pop culture, everyday life, human behavior, impersonations, self-deprecation
- Website: toddglass.com

Todd Steven Glass (born December 16, 1964) is an American stand-up comedian.

== Life and career ==
Glass was born and raised in the suburbs of Philadelphia, Pennsylvania. He first began performing stand-up comedy in Philadelphia in 1982 while attending Conestoga High School. He made his earliest television appearances in the late 1980s on A&E's An Evening at the Improv and in the early 1990s on several Comedy Central stand-up programs.

He is Jewish and dyslexic.

Glass is perhaps best known for his appearances as a contestant on the second and third seasons of NBC's Last Comic Standing and has appeared regularly on programs such as Jimmy Kimmel Live!, Late Night with Conan O'Brien, Tough Crowd with Colin Quinn, The Dennis Miller Show, Politically Incorrect, Louie, Tosh.0, Mr. Show with Bob and David, Preston and Steve and had his own Comedy Central Presents special in 2001. He co-hosted the podcast Comedy And Everything Else with fellow comics Jimmy Dore and Stefané Zamorano. Glass left the podcast in September 2009, and his departure was officially announced on the episode dated November 28, 2009. Since leaving, Glass has returned as a guest on several episodes.

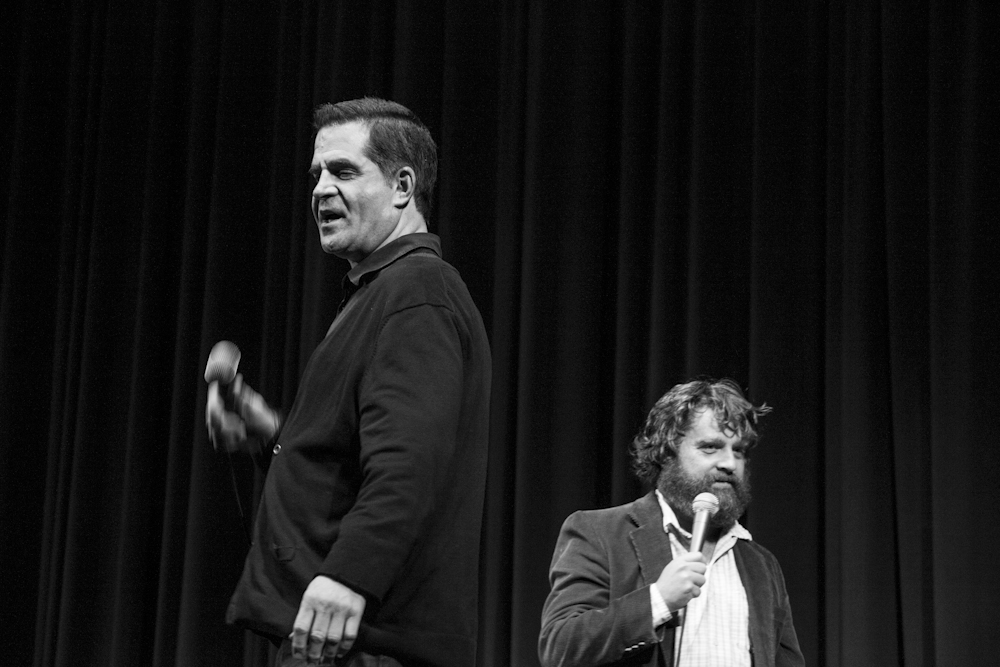
Glass with Zach Galifianakis in 2012

In 2001, Glass released his debut stand-up album called Vintage Todd Glass and Other Crap and was also featured on the two–CD set of the Comedy Death-Ray, a compilation album of various stand-up comics performing at the popular Comedy Death-Ray comedy showcase at the Upright Citizens Brigade Theater in Los Angeles. His album Thin Pig, was released on July 7, 2009, on Comedy Central Records.

In August 2011, his podcast The Todd Glass Show debuted on The Nerdist podcasting network. He hosts the show along with a regular lineup of guests and crew, including comedians Rory Scovel (and his wife Jordan) and Blake Wexler, audio engineers Katie Levine, Aristotle "Jet Ski" Acevedo, and musicians Lynn Shore and Joe MacKenzie, who write and perform many of the show's various "jingles" and audio cues. Glass also tours regularly

In January 2018, his comedy special Todd Glass: Act Happy debuted on Netflix.

Glass is the voice of the principal in the HBO Max adult animated series Ten Year Old Tom.

== Personal life ==
On April 16, 2010, Glass collapsed backstage at a Los Angeles comedy club Largo after suffering a heart attack. Glass appeared on The Bonnie Hunt Show only nine days later, talking about his recent "brush with death". Glass said he found out he had 100% blockage in his arteries and following an angioplasty, declared that he was doing fine. Glass blamed these health problems on bad genetics. Both parents had a history of heart problems; Todd's father had his first heart attack at age 30 and died of a subsequent heart attack at age 46. On December 20, 2012, Glass talked about his heart attack on the Adam Carolla Show, and said that he had lost 30 pounds since the incident. He had also stopped smoking (he previously maintained a "pack-a-month" habit), and that he had started taking the drug Lipitor to prevent further heart attacks.

Glass came out publicly as gay on January 16, 2012, during an episode of WTF with Marc Maron. The information had previously been known to friends and family, and Glass explained that he was worried about coming out publicly, but the recent string of suicide among LGBT youth motivated him to do so.

== Discography ==
=== Albums ===
- Vintage Todd Glass and Other Crap (2001)
- Thin Pig (2009) Comedy Central Records—Digital Album
- Todd Glass Talks About Stuff (2013)
- Todd Glass: Act Happy (2018)

=== Compilation appearances ===
- Comedy Death-Ray (2007) Comedy Central Records

== Books ==
- The Todd Glass Situation: A Bunch of Lies about My Personal Life and a Bunch of True Stories about My 30-Year Career in Stand-Up Comedy. Simon & Schuster, 2014. ISBN 978-1-4767-1441-7.
