= B. J. Porter =

American actor

B. J. Porter (born May 12, 1970, in Dallas, Texas) is an American actor, writer and comedian. Porter began his career writing and performing on the HBO sketch comedy program, Mr. Show. Porter, along with the rest of the Mr. Show writing staff, was nominated for an Emmy Award in 1999. Porter won an Emmy in 2014 and 2015 for the Funny or Die series Between Two Ferns with Zach Galifianakis, which he co-created. Between Two Ferns was also nominated for an Emmy in 2013.

Porter has served as a co-executive producer and writer on FX's It's Always Sunny In Philadelphia, Married and the Fox animated series Bordertown. Prior to that, he was a co-executive producer and writer on the HBO series The Life & Times of Tim, a writer for NTSF:SD:SUV on Adult Swim, and the head writer for the 2010 MTV Movie Awards show, hosted by Aziz Ansari. Porter has created pilots for Showtime, USA, Fox, NBC, Amazon Studios, Comedy Central, Warner Bros. Television and FX.

Porter performed as the comedy duo "The Fun Bunch" with frequent comedy partner Scott Aukerman. Porter and Aukerman also created the long-running live, weekly alternative comedy show Comedy Death-Ray, hosted at the Upright Citizens Brigade Theater in Los Angeles. In 2007, Porter and Aukerman created and produced a sketch show pilot for Fox titled The Right Now! Show. One of the sketches from this pilot, Between Two Ferns with Zach Galifianakis, was put up on the website Funny Or Die.

Porter, Aukerman and Zach Galifianakis co-created and executive produce the Funny or Die series Between Two Ferns with Zach Galifianakis for which they were nominated for an Emmy Award in 2013 and won the award in 2014 and 2015. It remains one of the most successful webseries and Porter has directed some of the most popular episodes including the Steve Carell and Jennifer Aniston episodes. In March 2014, an episode was released with President Barack Obama. It was designed to bring attention to the Affordable Care Act.

In addition to writing for film and television, Porter has made guest appearances on programs such as Just Shoot Me!, Malcolm in the Middle, Angel, and The Sarah Silverman Program.

== Filmography ==
=== Voice acting ===
- Bordertown – Bob Mothers
- Angel – Dennis Pearson
