= List of Adam Ruins Everything episodes =

Adam Ruins Everything is an American educational comedy television series starring Adam Conover that debuted on September 29, 2015, with a 12-episode season on TruTV. On January 7, 2016, it was announced that the show had been picked up for 14 additional episodes to air starting on August 23, 2016. The series aims to debunk misconceptions that pervade U.S. society. As of October 1, 2019, 64 episodes of Adam Ruins Everything have aired. The show also ran one live one-hour special in 2016.

== Series overview ==
Season	Episodes		Originally released	
Season	Episodes		First released	Last released
1	26	12	September 29, 2015	December 22, 2015
1	26	14	August 23, 2016	December 27, 2016
2	26	16	July 11, 2017	November 7, 2017
2	26	6	March 20, 2018	April 24, 2018
2	26	4	November 27, 2018	December 18, 2018
3	12	4	January 8, 2019	January 29, 2019
3	12	8	August 13, 2019	October 1, 2019

== Episodes ==
=== Season 1 (2015–16) ===
No. overall	No. in season	Title	Original release date	Prod. code	US viewers (millions)
1	1	"Adam Ruins Giving"	September 29, 2015	100	0.523
Emily intends to participate in her school's annual Give-A-Thon, only to be introduced to Adam Conover as he explains his show's premise. Adam then explains, to Emily's dismay, the monopoly De Beers has over diamond engagement rings; that "Toms Shoes" advertisements exploit empathy, and how food drives could be problematic. Though Adam provides an expert to explain that the best way to help needy people is by donating money, he gets kicked out by the participants with Emily the only one to enjoy her educational journey. Guest star: D'Arcy Carden as future wife. Experts: Edward Jay Epstein and Sophal Ear
2	2	"Adam Ruins Security"	October 6, 2015	101	0.439
Adam reveals how the Transportation Security Administration does not prevent terrorist attacks, the dangers of Tylenol overdoses, that all credit card numbers are publicly available, the "security" behind tamper-resistant packaging and credit card signatures, and that trust is the best form of security. Experts: Sidney M. Wolfe, Bruce Schneier, and Kevin Poulsen.
3	3	"Adam Ruins Cars"	October 13, 2015	102	0.488
Adam reveals that car dealerships have an unstoppable monopoly over new car sales, how much time is really spent in traffic, that the automotive industry introduced jaywalking to kick people off of streets, how automobiles' false sense of security leads to more accidents than drunk driving, and why cars are a financial burden on the working poor. Expert: Donald Shoup
4	4	"Adam Ruins Forensic Science"	October 20, 2015	104	0.526
Adam is a murder suspect as he examines truths in polygraph tests, eye witness testimonies, fingerprint analysis, and a number of other crime technique-related ideas. Guest stars: Carlos Alazraqui as Jack Nash, Alison Becker as Liz Cormack, Raphael Bob-Waksberg as Cleve Backster, and Larry Hankin as Larry. Expert: Elizabeth F. Loftus
5	5	"Adam Ruins Restaurants"	October 27, 2015	103	0.422
Emily and friends have their night ruined by Adam at a restaurant, talking about how wines are very similar regardless of labels, how seafood is not very healthy in restaurants and how tipping is a regressive custom. This episode also highlights how mislabeling fish is rampant in the restaurant industry. This episode featured the first appearance of Haley as Emily's friend. Guest star: John Michael Higgins as sommelier. Expert: David O. Conover
6	6	"Adam Ruins Hygiene"	November 3, 2015	105	0.599
Adam invades Haley's bathroom as she prepares to go on a date. It elucidates that halitosis was a scare tactic, the irony of flushable wipes, and why running water is one of the greatest achievements of modern times. Expert: Jack Sim
7	7	"Adam Ruins Voting"	November 10, 2015	106	0.569
Adam elucidates why the Electoral College is undemocratic, that the founding fathers did not want most Americans to vote, and how candidates can use gerrymandering to rig elections in their favor. Guest star: Betsy Randle as Donna Rehm
8	8	"Adam Ruins Work"	November 17, 2015	110	0.438
This episode explains why the 40-hour work week hinders productivity, why unpaid internships are exploitative, why freelancing is illegal, and why open disclosure of salaries is beneficial. Guest stars: Oscar Nunez as Benny and Naomi Ekperigin as Shaina. Experts: Robert Reich and Ryan Carson
9	9	"Adam Ruins Summer Fun"	December 1, 2015	107	0.505
Adam reveals that summer vacation inhibits learning, how a rodent destroyed creativity, and the unfair biased nature of video games for women. Conover later appeared in a debate on The Rebel Media's YouTube channel when one of its hosts, Lauren Southern, disputed this episode's gender equality claims. Expert: Kellee Santiago
10	10	"Adam Ruins Sex"	December 8, 2015	108	0.531
Adam elucidates that circumcision is common in the United States due to fear of masturbation, that Herpes is not as scary as the media makes it seem, and how most people do not truly understand the hymen. It also argues that the worst problem with sex is people feeling ashamed of it. Guest star: Kelly Marie Tran as Sharon
11	11	"Adam Ruins Nutrition"	December 15, 2015	109	0.508
Adam shows why vitamin supplements are not healthful, that sugar outweighs the "balanced breakfast" scale, and that most nutritional science quoted by the media is unscientific. Guest star: Sam Page as Dr. Todd Bodd Expert: John Bohannon
12	12	"Adam Ruins Death"	December 22, 2015	111	0.614
Adam goes on a date with Haley, but Emily is hit by a truck in a freak accident. Adam discusses several failed attempts at terrestrial immortality, and reveals the American funeral industry's exploitative tactics, such as embalming and the price of caskets. The episode also stresses the importance of having a plan for last rites, as many do not notify their loved ones about their preferences for a funeral or long-term life support which burden their families. After Haley dies in a freak accident, Emily consoles Adam as he concedes that grappling with death's uncertainty can be just as healthy as clear-cut answers. Expert: Caitlin Doughty
13	13	"Adam Ruins Hollywood"	August 23, 2016	114	0.472
Adam reveals that everything celebrities wear is an advertisement, that movie awards are won not by talent but by bribery, the inconsistencies of MPAA ratings, and how "reality" shows are fake. Guest Stars: Rachel Bloom as herself, Ariana Madix as herself, and Ray Wise as Netflix Executive.
14	14	"Adam Ruins Football"	August 30, 2016	TBA	0.506
Adam reveals the truth about the NFL Playoffs, the supposed dangers and exaggerated fear of dehydration, and concussions. At the end of the episode, Adam's sister Rhea makes her debut. Guest Stars: River Butcher as Rhea Conover, Mo Gaffney as Patty (Murph's mom), Robert R. Shafer as Ray (Murph's dad), Erik Griffin as Ozzy. Expert: Ann McKee
15	15	"Adam Ruins Weddings"	September 6, 2016	TBA	0.442
Adam attends Emily's wedding to Murph, causing the groom grief by elucidating the capitalist traditions behind modern ceremonies, how the feelings of newlyweds are susceptible to change, and claims that divorce can be empowering. Guest stars: Mo Gaffney as Patty, Robert R. Shafer as Ray Expert: Stephanie Coontz
16	16	"Adam Ruins Malls"	September 13, 2016	TBA	0.396
Adam and Emily make a trip to the mall where Adam elucidates the origins of the modern enclosed shopping mall, the real difference between "outlet" and normal clothing stores, and the largely-unregulated supplement market. Emily in turn elucidates Luxottica's near-stranglehold on the entire vision care industry. Adam's sister appears at the beginning and end of the episode. Guest Stars: River Butcher as Rhea Conover, Robert R. Shafer as Ray
17	17	"Adam Ruins Animals"	September 20, 2016	TBA	0.419
Adam explains how purebred dogs are genetically abnormal, how stray cats are dangerous, and how monetizing the demand for trophy hunting can help animals. Guest stars: Jeris Poindexter as homeless man, Sonya Eddy as the pet store owner
18	18	"Adam Ruins Immigration"	September 27, 2016	TBA	0.464
Adam elucidates to a Mexican-American student and her grandmother over how increasing national border security does not deter illegal immigration, how the immigration courts are severely broken, and explores America's history with mass deportation. Guest stars: Esai Morales as Alfonso, Mimi Davila as Gabriela Expert: Doug Massey
19	19	"Adam Ruins Housing"	October 4, 2016	TBA	0.503
Adam discusses how buying a house is worse than renting one, how Airbnb enables crooks to run unsafe or unlicensed uncertified hotels. Building houses for homeless people saves money by significantly reducing their use of police, medical and social services. Before the segments on Airbnb and homelessness, Adam hosts two segments called "Ever Wonder Why". The former is about tax breaks and the latter is about the Hollywood Sign. Guest Stars: River Butcher as Rhea Conover, Maribeth Monroe as Kheather, Jeris Poindexter as homeless man, Betsy Sodaro as Terry aka the squatter.
20	20	"Adam Ruins Drugs"	November 15, 2016	119	0.545
In this episode, Adam exposes why cannabis incarcerates thousands of innocent minorities, how D.A.R.E actually increased drug use, and how legal drugs are just as dangerous as illegal ones leading to opioid epidemic. Emily is arrested at the end of the episode due to the many drugs she confiscated from her students. This episode's "Ever Wonder Why" segments are about Fish Oil and Q-Tips
21	21	"Adam Ruins Prison"	November 22, 2016	TBA	0.521
Adam visits Emily in prison. In this episode, Adam reveals that private prisons and the Corrections Corporation of America monetize inmates, why Solitary confinement should be banned, and why prison keeps setting people up to fail. Emily is cleared of all charges, and promises to help her cellmate Kendra out. This episode's "Ever Wonder Why?" segments are on cheese and treadmills. Guest Stars: River Butcher as Rhea Conover
22	22	"Adam Ruins the Wild West"	November 29, 2016	TBA	0.382
In this episode, Adam talks about how the modern image of the cowboy is wrong, how women shaped the wild west, and how the west's true hero was not even a person. This episode's "Ever Wonder Why?" segments are about Johnny Appleseed and the Statue of Liberty. Guest star: Peri Gilpin as Miss Pearl
23	23	"Adam Ruins the Internet"	December 6, 2016	121	0.392
In this episode, Adam discusses how the Internet has been underrated for nearly all of history, why cable companies are to blame for slow Internet, and how "free" websites that claim to protect privacy, like Facebook and Google, are total hypocrites. This episode's "Ever Wonder Why?" segments are on the word "literally" and the standard paper size. Guest stars: DC Pierson as Mitchell, River Butcher as Rhea Conover
24	24	"Adam Ruins Justice"	December 13, 2016	123	0.386
Rhea, who works as a public defender, brings Kendra to court to clear her charges. In this episode, Adam talks about the McDonald's hot coffee lawsuit's false interpretation and why trial by jury is rigged with bias. Then, Rhea talks about how public defenders are in a difficult line of work. This episode's "Ever Wonder Why?" segments are on photographic memories and the Secret Service. Guest Stars: River Butcher as Rhea Conover, Kurt Braunohler as Judge Kurt
25	25	"Adam Ruins Christmas"	December 20, 2016	124	0.527
Rhea and Adam attempt to prepare for the Conover parents to visit. In this episode, Adam claims that Christians hijacked a Pagan holiday to create Christmas, why gift giving makes no economic sense, and Santa Claus' true history. This episode's "Ever Wonder Why?" segments are about It's a Wonderful Life and snowflakes. Guest Stars: River Butcher as Rhea Conover, Betsy Randle as Donna Rehm, Denny Siegel as Weird Hippie Aunt, and Adam Savage as the narrator. Expert: Joel Waldfogel
26	26	"Adam Ruins Going Green"	December 27, 2016	125	0.490
In this episode, Adam talks about how big companies shifted the blame of littering onto people, how electric cars can actually hurt the environment, and what to do now that climate change is happening. This episode's "Ever Wonder Why?" segments are on "going paperless" and bananas.

=== Season 2 (2017–18) ===
On December 7, 2016, TruTV announced that Adam Ruins Everything would return for another season with sixteen episodes. The season premiered on July 11, 2017. An additional six episodes, animated and dubbed Reanimated History, premiered on March 20, 2018.

No. overall	No. in season	Title	Original release date	Prod. code	US viewers (millions)
27	1	"Adam Ruins Having a Baby"	July 11, 2017	TBA	0.430
In this episode, Adam talks to Emily about the myth of being pregnant after 35, if breastfeeding is better or worse than formula, and postpartum depression. Instead of last season's "Ever Wonder Why?" segments, there are new "Tell Me More" segments, where Adam interviews the experts seen on the show. This time Adam interviews author of "Lactivism" Courtney Jung and researcher Jean Twenge.
28	2	"Adam Ruins Weight Loss"	July 18, 2017	TBA	0.523
In this episode, Adam discusses the irony of low-fat diets, why counting calories is a waste of time and why extreme weight loss shows are totally fraudulent. This episode's "Tell Me More" segment is an interview with Dr. Kevin D. Hall, a senior investigator at the National Institutes of Health who conducted a six-year study on contestants of The Biggest Loser.
29	3	"Adam Ruins the Hospital"	July 25, 2017	TBA	0.423
In this episode, Adam diagnoses a hypochondriac over how arbitrarily inflated hospital costs created an entirely unaffordable and unfair system, reveals how misuse of antibiotics could ruin modern medicine, and elucidates why mammograms might not be as helpful as commonly thought. This episode's "Tell Me More" segment is an interview with Dr. Joann Elmore, a professor of medicine and epidemiology at the University of Washington.
30	4	"Adam Ruins Dating"	August 1, 2017	TBA	0.386
Adam participates in a date and swipes right on knowledge to expose the flaws in dating sites, reveal why alpha males do not really exist and explain how personality tests are a total failure. This episode's "Tell Me More" segment is an interview with Dr. David Pittenger, a professor in psychology at Marshall University.
31	5	"Adam Ruins Art"	August 8, 2017	TBA	0.309
In this episode, Adam asks an art student on what makes art great by illustrating why certain pieces are considered classics (regardless of merit), exposing that nothing is "original" and revealing how today's fine art market is primarily a tax dodge for the wealthy. This episode's "Tell Me More" segments are interviews with Dr. James E. Cutting, a professor of Psychology at Cornell University and Megan Fenton, one of the show's production designers.
32	6	"Adam Ruins What We Learned in School"	August 15, 2017	TBA	0.392
In his first fully animated episode, Adam teaches a cartoon teacher and her class that Christopher Columbus was a genocidal imbecile, King Tut was insignificant, and grammar rules are very flexible. This episode's "Tell Me More" segment is an interview with Dr. Anne Curzan, a professor of English at University of Michigan. Guest Stars: Carlos Alazraqui as Christopher Columbus.
33	7	"Adam Ruins College"	August 22, 2017	TBA	0.392
Class is in session as Adam elucidates the unfavorable chances of becoming a dropout billionaire, why "top college" lists are rigged with bias and why the once groundbreaking student loan system has created trillions of dollars in debt and ruined the lives of billions of graduates. This episode's "Tell Me More" segment is an interview with Cynthia Kao, one of the show staff writers, Peter Miller, a story producer for the show, and Heather Jarvis, an attorney who specializes in student loan law.
34	8	"Emily Ruins Adam"	August 29, 2017	TBA	0.357
Adam's world gets turned on its head when Emily takes over to "ruin" him, pointing out where a few of his facts fall short. She debunks the idea that IQ tests measure intelligence and reveals their racist history, then does a rapid-fire battle against information that Adam has gotten wrong in previous episodes. Plus, she explains the "backfire effect," and why proving someone wrong, even with hard evidence, will not necessarily convince them to change their mind. Adam promises to be better with his facts in the future, and ends up meeting Melinda. This episode's "Tell Me More" segment is an interview with Dr. Stephan Lewandowsky, professor of Cognitive Science at University of Bristol.
35	9	"Adam Ruins His Vacation"	September 19, 2017	TBA	0.422
When he and Melinda decide to go on vacation, Adam shows to be bad at relaxing as he reveals the surprising history behind Mount Rushmore, explain how Las Vegas slot machines are deliberately engineered addictions and uncovers the strange story of Hawaiian statehood. The New Day cameo in the Mount Rushmore segment. This episode's "Tell Me More" segment is an interview with Williamson B.C Chang, a law professor at University of Hawaii at Manoa.
36	10	"Adam Ruins the Suburbs"	September 26, 2017	TBA	0.353
Adam elucidates to a family man how the idealized green-grass lawn is an unnatural monstrosity, that the design of the cul-de-sac suburbs slowly kills people and how redlining led to today's institutionalized segregation in schools. This episode's "Tell Me More" segment is an interview with Nikole Hannah-Jones, a staff writer for The New York Times.
37	11	"Adam Ruins the Economy"	October 3, 2017	TBA	0.320
Adam exposes why filing taxes is hard, why the economic numbers that people focus on do not provide the whole story, and the possibility of a return of American manufacturing is now unachievable. This episode's "Tell Me More" segment is an interview with Jessica Huseman, a staff reporter from ProPublica.
38	12	"Adam Ruins Conspiracy Theories"	October 10, 2017	TBA	0.373
Adam debunks Melinda's notions of the fake Moon landing theory, her insistence to believe causing him to discuss the Satanic Panic of the 1980s and how to spot a false theory. This episode's "Tell Me More" segment is an interview with Dr. Daniel Jolley, lecturer in Psychology, at Staffordshire University.
39	13	"Adam Ruins Spa Day"	October 17, 2017	TBA	0.417
Adam exposes to a spa-goer (Dreama Walker) why pricey detox treatments are a rip-off, MSG's scary undeserved reputation, and the placebo effect is way more powerful than people think. This episode's "Tell Me More" segment is an interview with Dr. Gerard Mullin, gastroenterologist, at Johns Hopkins Hospital.
40	14	"Adam Ruins Halloween"	October 24, 2017	TBA	0.299
Adam explains to a child that strangers with poisoned candy are nonexistent, the panic over Orson Welles' War of the Worlds broadcast never occurred and mediums are total frauds. This episode's "Tell Me More" segment is an interview with Mark Edward, author of Psychic Blues: Confessions of a Conflicted Medium.
41	15	"Adam Ruins Science"	October 31, 2017	TBA	0.347
Adam shares the truth behind testing mice, scarce funding and reproducing results to a scientist fair participant. This episode's "Tell Me More" segment is an interview with Brian Nosek, executive director of Center for Open Science.
42	16	"Adam Ruins the Future"	November 7, 2017	TBA	0.348
Adam, nervous over his relationship to Melinda, attempts to change the subject by exposing the truth on unregulated food expiration dates, 401(k) and retirement, and the unpredictable future. This episode's "Tell Me More" segment is an interview with Teresa Ghilarducci, professor of Economics at The New School for Social Research.
43	17	"Give Me Liberty or Give Me Truth"	March 20, 2018	TBA	0.312
Adam appears on Animated History mini-series to present startling facts about George Washington and the Revolutionary Army, Paul Revere's overrated ride, and how a slave contributed to America's Revolutionary War victory. Instead of the season's previous "Tell Me More" segments, there are new "Same Time, Different Place" segments, hosted by Emily Axford. This time, Emily talks about Toussaint Louverture and the Haitian Revolution. This is the first of six fully-animated "Reanimated History" episodes.
44	18	"The First Factsgiving"	March 27, 2018	TBA	0.317
Adam explains the true story behind Thanksgiving as the result of pilgrims occupying a dead village and helping the Wampanoag slaughter their enemies, the true story of Pocahontas, and how cities in the New World rivaled London in scale before most of the indigenous tribes were wiped out by disease before their discovery. In this episode's "Same Time, Different Place" segment, Emily talks about Zheng He, the famed Chinese mariner, explorer, diplomat, fleet admiral, and court eunuch during China's early Ming dynasty. This is the second of six fully-animated "Reanimated History" episodes.
45	19	"Mutually Assured Ruination"	April 3, 2018	TBA	0.244
Adam reveals that the United States kicked off the Cuban Missile Crisis, how a lone female politician stood up to Joseph McCarthy, and how a bureaucratic mistake brought down the Berlin Wall. In this episode's "Same Time, Different Place" segment, Emily talks about Nelson Mandela and his efforts to end the Apartheid legislation in South Africa. This is the third of six fully-animated "Reanimated History" episodes.
46	20	"An Ancient History of Violence"	April 10, 2018	TBA	0.419
Adam shares that it was prohibited for gladiators to kill opponents, how Boudicca and the Celts brought the Roman Empire to its knees, and that the brave 300 Spartans tallied closer to 7,000. In this episode's "Same Time, Different Place" segment, Emily talks about Cai Lun and the invention of paper in China. This is the fourth of six fully-animated "Reanimated History" episodes.
47	21	"The Copernican Ruin-aissance"	April 17, 2018	TBA	0.254
Adam sheds some light on Copernicus and the reason his teachings were outlawed by the Catholic Church long after his death; how a rogue dwarf named Andreas Vesalius revolutionized anatomy; and tulip mania. In this episode's "Same Time, Different Place" segment, Emily talks about Akbar the Great and how he brought religious tolerance to 16th century India. This is the fifth of six fully-animated "Reanimated History" episodes.
48	22	"100 Years Ago Today"	April 24, 2018	TBA	0.299
Adam digs into the Panama Canal by revealing Theodore Roosevelt orchestrated Panama's founding to build it and the conditions of the workers who did the building; how Harvey Washington Wiley fought to keep food from killing people; and that the Spanish flu killed more Americans than all 20th-century wars combined. This is the final fully-animated "Reanimated History" episode.
49	23	"Adam Ruins Guns"	November 27, 2018	223	0.444
Adam gets a shot at both sides of the gun debate by enlightening a family on the scientific evidence on gun regulation's effectiveness which includes an assault weapons ban would be ineffective, showing the evolution of the National Rifle Association of America and how it altered the interpretation of the Second Amendment, and that both sides of the gun debate ignore how guns and gun regulation affect minorities.
50	24	"Adam Ruins Sleep"	December 4, 2018	224	0.346
Adam states to a businesswoman that the mattress industry was always a huge scam, that cheap school systems created sleep-deprived teenagers, how artificial light altered people's sleep schedules, and how "safe" sleep medications may actually be harmful.
51	25	"Adam Ruins Tech"	December 11, 2018	225	0.304
Adam explores how tech monopolies like Amazon's over online shopping harm consumers; how consumers do not fully own their technology devices because of corporate abuse of copyright law; and that tech companies not only routinely evade taxes, but also outright eradicate competition and harm society by abusing their monopoly power.
52	26	"Adam Ruins Flying"	December 18, 2018	TBA	0.366
Adam takes to the skies to elucidate how airline miles and other credit card rewards are huge ripoffs, the extremely sexist "golden age of flying," and how lack of government regulation allowed the four major airlines (American, United, Delta, and Southwest) to rule the skies with an iron fist.

=== Season 3 (2019) ===
No. overall	No. in season	Title	Original release date	Prod. code	US viewers (millions)
53	1	"Adam Ruins a Plate of Nachos"	January 8, 2019	301	0.313
Adam is invited to Murph's "Bros' Night" and takes a bite at foods with the worst truths by stating that Mexican drug cartels import most avocados, that the meat industry lies about health risks and manipulates opposers to side with them, and how corn subsidies changed the crop into the most overused and unhealthy food in American history. Experts: Rodrigo Canales, Professor, Yale School of Management
54	2	"Adam Ruins a Sitcom"	January 15, 2019	302	0.296
Adam appears on a sitcom and tackles classic television stereotypes, such as the racist history behind public pools, the antisemitic history behind basketball, why Asian-Americans are commonly perceived to be smarter, and how on-screen toxic masculinity masks the problems young men face today. Experts: Ellen Wu, Professor, Indiana University Bloomington; Wade Davis
55	3	"Adam Ruins Games"	January 22, 2019	303	0.220
Adam misunderstands a shopkeeper into revealing that video games do not correlate to violent behavior, how Monopoly was originally conceived to explain how capitalism damages society, and discusses how the Olympic Games economically harm almost everyone involved except the International Olympic Committee. Guest star: "Weird" Al Yankovic (Devil) Experts: Adam Nelson
56	4	"Adam Ruins Nature"	January 29, 2019	304	0.250
Adam elucidates to a nature-loving hiker how Mt. Everest became a common tourist trap, how many recent natural disasters were actually caused by human error, and how humans have a greater impact on nature than they realize. Guest star: Zach Cregger
57	5	"Adam Ruins America"	August 13, 2019	305	0.285
Adam visits Uncle Sam and reveals why American poverty is inescapable, why adhering to the Constitution hinders passing new amendments, and how the Reconstruction era was actually destructive. Between the segments about the Constitution and Reconstruction, Adam discusses the show's usage of the term "America," its usage outside the United States, and how the term's usage in "Adam Ruins What We Learned in School" caused confusion for international audiences.
58	6	"Adam Ruins A Night Out"	August 20, 2019	306	0.308
With Adam accompanying her on a night out with her college friend, Emily reveals why women are expected to shave, why most women's clothing lacks pockets, how alcohol consumption has no health benefits but many health risks, and some startling facts about friendships. Between the segments about clothing pockets and alcohol, Emily discusses the noise levels of restaurants and later hang-overs.
59	7	"Adam Ruins Doing Good"	August 27, 2019	307	0.257
Adam reveals to a dying philanthropist how Teach for America is killing the American school system, how large corporations' exploitation of recycling is polluting the planet, and that most billionaires only create charities to boost their credibility as well as avoid taxes. Between the segments about recycling and charities, Emily discusses the role of pandas in politics; and, at the end of the episode, she discusses the dark side of microlending.
60	8	"Adam Ruins A Murder"	September 3, 2019	308	0.265
Adam ends up in a murder scheme while revealing why drivers are rarely held accountable for vehicular collisions, how the Border Patrol legally violates the Fourth Amendment, and why preserving corpses can benefit medical research. Between the segments about vehicular collisions and the Border Patrol, Emily discusses the dangers of deer; and, at the end of the episode, she discusses why lying is as healthy as telling the truth.
61	9	"Adam Ruins Music"	September 10, 2019	309	0.255
Adam reveals to a music-lover why white artists' covers in the early days of rock-and-roll were more popular than the originals, that Ticketmaster and Live Nation Entertainment have an unstoppable monopoly over concerts, why many of today's musicians are forced to sell out, and how record labels extort their artists due to the advent of streaming services. Between the segments about rock-and-roll and concerts, Emily discusses earworms; and, between the segments about concerts and today's artists, she discusses the legal status of Happy Birthday to You.
62	10	"Adam Ruins Little Bugs"	September 17, 2019	310	0.242
Adam reveals to a woman getting ready for a party how spiders actually benefit humanity, how bug parts are hidden inside everyday foods and a whole insect can be more nutritious than part of conventional livestock, and some bugs actually help the human body function properly. Between the segments about food and the human body, Emily discusses what actually happens when a caterpillar becomes a butterfly; and, at the end of the episode, she discusses the eradication of mosquitoes.
63	11	"Adam Ruins Cops"	September 24, 2019	311	0.203
Adam reveals the serious issues behind SWAT teams, how student resource officers send children into a life of crime, and that the issue of mass-incarceration was due to cops cherry-picking whom they arrest. Guest star: Tom Kenny
64	12	"Adam Ruins Himself"	October 1, 2019	312	0.177
As Adam wraps up the show's third season, his self-doubt gets the best of him to reveal the show's biases, the inconsistencies and mistakes in previous episodes, the sinister agenda of advertising, and how advertisers shift the focus of the show. Between the correction and advertising segments, Adam discusses the truth about dopamine.

=== Specials ===
Title	Original release date	US viewers (millions)
"The Adam Ruins Everything Election Special"	October 25, 2016	0.440
Filmed in front of a live audience, in this hour-long special, Adam discusses how the 2016 election is just a big rerun, the history of women in politics, why outsiders are worse than politicians, the impact of money on politics, and the one thing that makes this election unique from the others.
