= Pardue =

Pardue is a surname. Notable people with the surname include:

- Austin Pardue (1899–1981), American cleric
- Homer C. Pardue (1910–1979), American thoroughbred trainer and owner
- Jimmy Pardue (1930–1964), American race car driver
- Kip Pardue (born 1975), American model and actor
- Mary-Lou Pardue, American geneticist
- Deva Pardue, Irish American graphic designer and activist
