= Not Safe with Nikki Glaser =

- Genre: Talk show Sex comedy
- Created by: Nikki Glaser; Chris Convy
- Written by: Bob Castrone (head writer)
- Directed by: Brian McAloon; Jay Karas; Lenn Goodside
- Starring: Nikki Glaser
- Theme music composer: The Penthouse Productions
- Country of origin: United States
- Original language: English
- No. of seasons: 1
- No. of episodes: 20

Production
- Executive producers: Nikki Glaser; Chris McGuire; Chris Convy; Alex Murray; Brad Petrigala; Neal Kendall
- Producer: Tommy Caprio
- Editors: Seth Clark; Gerrad A. Holtz; Asaf Eisenberg
- Running time: 21 minutes
- Production companies: Convy Entertainment; Brillstein Entertainment Partners; Guinea Pig Productions

Original release
- Network: Comedy Central
- Release: February 9 – August 9, 2016

Related
- Nikki & Sara Live

Not Safe with Nikki Glaser is an American television sex comedy talk show series hosted by Nikki Glaser. It premiered February 9, 2016 at 10:30 p.m. in the United States on Comedy Central, in Canada on MUCH, and in the United Kingdom on 4Music. The show features Glaser and a panel of comedians as they talk about topics about sex.

On March 29, 2016, Comedy Central extended the episode order of the first season by 10 episodes. The second half of the season premiered on June 7, 2016. On November 11, 2016, the show was cancelled.

== Recurring guests ==
- Rachel Feinstein (1 and 19)
- Ron Funches (2 and 16)
- Chris D'Elia (3 and 12)
- Jim Jefferies (4 and 15)
- Bridget Everett (4 and 20)
- Moshe Kasher (7 and 18)
- Kristen Schaal (8 and 12)

== Recurring segments ==
Tinder Tapout (episode 1, 5, 10, 11, 16, 20)

Nikki goes on Tinder under her "Party Bitch Kayla" persona and says progressively strange things to try and alienate the man she's in contact with. Her guests guess after each statement whether or not he tapped out (ended the conversation) or responded.

Comedians Do Porn (episode 3, 8, 12, 18)

Nikki and a guest each tells porn actors what to say during an improv skit with simulated sex.

Pay Your Tab Cab (episode 2, 12, 19)

Nikki and a stripper co-host drive around in a cab and pick up men who have just left a strip club. She asks them some questions about women to give them a chance to win some money back.

Sext Symbols (episode 4 and 12)

Nikki asks a guest to type out a story purely in emojis. She then guesses what they intended by the symbols. Then the guest explains what they intended the emojis to mean.

What's Your Number? (episode 8 and 13)

A video is shown of an interviewed person stating a number in response to a question. Nikki provides 3 possible questions the number is an answer to. Her guests must guess which question was the one which was asked.

The Sex Talk (episode 10 and 17)

Nikki and her guests give "the talk" but use different animals as stand-ins for children to avoid the advice causing mental harm. This segment was also on Nikki's previous show, Nikki and Sara Live.

(Lie Detector, this segment does not have a title) (episode 1 and 4)

On the pilot, Nikki hooks her friends up to a lie detector and asks them, "Do you want to have sex with me?" The tests are done by John, an expert polygraph examiner. In the episode "Already Wet", she does the tests with her parents and asks them about their sex life.

== Episodes ==
No.	Title	Guests	Original release date	Prod. code	US viewers (millions)
1	"Carpe Do 'Em"	Rory Scovel & Rachel Feinstein	February 9, 2016	101	0.495
Nikki and her guests, Rory and Rachel, talk about the topic of "friend zone", and she hooks her best friends up to a lie detector and asks them, "Do you want to have sex with me?" In "Tinder Tapout", they see how much a guy will put up with just to have a hookup. Then Nikki attends a foot fetish party.
2	"Dick Moves"	Doug Benson & Ron Funches	February 16, 2016	102	0.524
Nikki sets up a professional photo shoot to help men improve taking and sending their dick pics, picks up guys at strip clubs to test their knowledge of women in "Pay Your Tab Cab", and reveals new scientific discovery on sex in Studies Show with special guests Ron and Doug.
3	"I'm The Boat"	Esther Povitsky & Chris D'Elia	February 23, 2016	103	0.536
Nikki and Kyle Kinane feed lines to pornographic actors Luna Star and Jake Jace during a taping. She and her guests Chris and Esther discuss insecurities from watching others' photos and videos in "Insta-Curities" where she also reveals she's been stalking her boyfriend's ex-girlfriend's Instagram account. Then they talk about friends who have been left behind when they start dating someone new.
4	"Already Wet"	Bridget Everett & Jim Jefferies	March 1, 2016	104	0.511
Nikki sits on a vibrator, talks about squirting with Sara Schaefer, gets to the bottom of her parents' sex lives, and chats with Jim and Bridget.
5	"Don't Touch That Remote"	Jen Kirkman & Chris Hardwick	March 8, 2016	105	0.487
Nikki hears horror stories from maids who clean up after hotel guests have sex, plays a game of "Tinder Tapout", talks to people about their fingering styles, and chats with Chris and Jen.
6	"Find My Boyfriend A Girlfriend"	T.J. Miller & Pete Holmes	March 15, 2016	106	0.533
Nikki weighs the pros and cons of sexting with Pete and T.J., considers entering into an open relationship and tries out a marijuana-infused lubricant.
7	"Your Wedding Sucks"	Grace Helbig & Moshe Kasher	March 22, 2016	107	0.462
Nikki welcomes special guests Grace and Moshe, and she confronts engaged couples about how their weddings are inconveniencing their friends.
8	"Get Her a Glass of Water"	Kristen Schaal & Kyle Kinane	March 29, 2016	108	0.469
Nikki explores the topic of one-night stands, feeds lines to porn actors Dani Daniels and Lexington Steele during a shoot, and welcomes special guests Kristen and Kyle.
9	"Panty Sniffers"	Todd Glass & Nick Thune	April 5, 2016	109	0.480
Sex columnist Dan Savage gives advice to Nikki's younger self, then Nikki interviews some "panty sniffers" and chats with guests Nick and Todd.
10	"I Broke My Dick"	Natasha Leggero & Patton Oswalt	April 12, 2016	110	0.591
Nikki explores the world of pegging and plays a round of "Tinder Tapout" with special guests Patton and Natasha.
11	"Is That Your Belt?"	Mary Lynn Rajskub & Adam Pally	June 7, 2016	111	0.523
Nikki takes a look at the world of professional cuddlers and plays a round of "Tinder Tapout" with special guests Mary and Adam. She also comments on the sexiness of Shabani and a horse.
12	"I Miss David Bowie"	Kate Walsh & Chris D’Elia	June 14, 2016	112	0.404
Nikki uses the magic of porn to discuss women in the workplace with Kristen Schaal, then chats with guests Chris and Kate.
13	"Really Real R&B"	Riki Lindhome & Anthony Jeselnik	June 21, 2016	113	0.400
During the cold opening Niki rants about Aaron Persky's ruling on the People v. Turner case. Nikki enlists musician Omarion to create a new R&B hit based on real-life sex stories and then plays another round of "What's Your Number?" with Anthony and Riki.
14	"Make America Horny Again"	Maria Bamford & Marc Maron	June 28, 2016	114	0.419
Nikki travels to a Donald Trump rally in San Diego to see what his supporters think about sex, then explores what constitutes cheating with guests Marc and Maria.
15	"Mysteries of the Female Orgasm"	Liza Treyger & Jim Jefferies	July 5, 2016	115	0.439
Nikki teams up with a group of women to conduct groundbreaking research on the female orgasm and learns about flirting via GIFs with guests Jim and Liza.
16	"Blind Date Champion"	Katie Nolan & Ron Funches	July 12, 2016	116	0.434
Nikki explores hilariously bad dates with Dave Waite, and plays "Tinder Tapout" with Katie and Ron. Nikki and Katie do a serious segment addressing rape on college campuses.
17	"Rock-Hard Weekend"	Nicole Byer & David Spade	July 19, 2016	117	0.509
Nikki looks into the alarming popularity of over-the-counter male enhancement pills with Dr. Drew Pinsky, and guests David and Nicole explain complex social issues to kittens.
18	"Is This Forever?"	Moshe Kasher & Eric André	July 26, 2016	118	0.339
Nikki gives advice to couples considering a prenup, presents another installment of "Comedians Do Porn", and welcomes guests Eric and Moshe.
19	"Museum of Broken Relationships"	Margaret Cho & Kurt Braunohler	August 2, 2016	119	0.466
Nikki and Rachel Feinstein tour a new museum dedicated to relationships gone bad, Riley Silverman discusses the daily costs of being a woman, and guests Kurt and Margaret debunk common sexual stereotypes.
20	"24 Hours in a Strip Club"	Bridget Everett & Jim Norton	August 9, 2016	120	0.412
Nikki visits Sapphire Las Vegas to spend a full day in a strip club to beat Lamar Odom's record. She then plays "Tinder Tapout" with Jim and Bridget. Announcing this was the season finale, she tells people it is important to talk about sex because Donald Trump is doing that. She then asks people to sexually harass Trump, after accusing Trump of telling women to quit their jobs. She also accuses Mike Pence of abusing turtles for pleasure by flipping them onto their backs. Auld Lang Syne plays with balloons and confetti dropping.

== Not Safe Podcast ==
Not Safe Podcast was an internet podcast series co-hosted by Nikki Glaser and Dan St. Germain. St. Germain is one of the writers of Not Safe with Nikki Glaser. The series was hosted on SoundCloud. It was airing since its first episode on Jan 7, 2016, which was roughly one month earlier than the broadcast of the television show. On the series Glaser and St. Germain talked about sex news and personal relationship stories.
