= Riley Silverman =

American comedian and podcaster

- Occupations: Comedian; Model; Writer; Podcaster
- Years active: 2010s–present

Riley "Rye" Silverman is an American stand-up comedian, model, writer, and podcaster. She has appeared on television networks including Comedy Central and MTV. She is known for her work as a show writer on the Maximum Fun podcast network. She is also a model for the fashion brand ModCloth.

== Personal life ==
Riley Silverman grew up in Ohio. Silverman identifies as transgender. She has spoken openly about her experiences with transitioning while pursuing a career in stand-up comedy. She has described beginning her transition during the early part of her career. In interviews, she has also spoken about instances in which she was initially perceived as cisgender before she publicly revealed her gender identity. Silverman has advocated for greater transgender representation in the entertainment industry.

== Career ==
Silverman moved to Los Angeles in 2010 and began performing stand-up comedy. In 2015, She released her debut stand-up comedy album, Intimate Apparel, which was recorded at the Tao Comedy Studio in Los Angeles. The album reached number one on Amazon's Best Sellers (Comedy) chart following its release. It was re-released under the label A Special Thing in 2017. She became a writer for the panel shows International Waters and Troubled Waters on the Maximum Fun podcast network.

Silverman's comedy has been featured on MTV. She featured in the comedy talk show Not Safe with Nikki Glaser in Comedy Central and the sitcom Take My Wife. She has made multiple appearances at the All Jane Comedy Festival in Portland, Oregon. She took part in the first annual Queer Comedy Festival held in Portland in 2017.

Silverman has also contributed articles to the entertainment website Pajiba.com and has appeared as a guest on several comedy podcasts. She is a model for the fashion brand ModCloth. She was named as #FashionTruth girl for April 2015 by ModCloth. She was listed as one of "10 Women Comedians Who Smash the Patriarchy" by The Culture Trip and was named as one of "100 Queer Women We Love" by the GO magazine.

== Discography ==
- Intimate Apparel (2015)

== Filmography ==
Year	Title	Role	Notes
2016	Not Safe with Nikki Glaser	Herself	Television series
2016	Take My Wife	Guest role	Television series
