= Take My Wife (2016 TV series) =

Television series

- Genre: Comedy
- Created by: Cameron Esposito; River Butcher
- Starring: Cameron Esposito; River Butcher
- Country of origin: United States
- Original language: English
- No. of series: 2
- No. of episodes: 14

Production
- Executive producers: Cameron Esposito; River Butcher; Scott Aukerman; David Jargowsky
- Running time: 30 minutes
- Production companies: Young & Sharp Productions; Comedy Bang! Bang! Productions

Original release
- Network: Seeso
- Release: August 11, 2016 – March 5, 2018

Take My Wife is an American sitcom on the Seeso comedy subscription streaming service. The show follows former real-life couple Cameron Esposito and River Butcher as they share their lives as stand-up comics who are balancing work, relationships, and the breaking down of gender barriers. On December 19, 2016, Seeso renewed the series for a second season. On August 9, 2017, Seeso announced the shutdown of its service by the end of the year, leaving Take My Wife without a home. On March 5, 2018, it was announced that season 1 and the previously unaired season 2 were now available on iTunes (US) and would be available on the Starz app starting May 1, 2018. Take My Wife is also now available on iTunes in the UK (as of April 30, 2018).

For its second season, the show's creators and producers featured large numbers of women, people of color, and LGBTQ individuals in front of and behind the camera. Esposito has acknowledged this was a conscious effort on their part: "As a small budget show, we prioritized hiring queer folks, POC, and female standups."

== Cast ==
=== Main ===
- Cameron Esposito as self
- River Butcher as self
- Zeke Nicholson as Dave
- Laura Kightlinger as Frances

=== Guest stars ===
- Eliza Skinner as Eliza
- Jonah Ray as Podcast Host
- Alice Wetterlund as Alice
- Gabe Dunn as Brie
- Janet Varney as Melina Marquez
- Matt Braunger as Bob Herzog
- Maria Bamford as herself
- Kulap Vilaysack as Danielle
- Joe DeRosa as Kent
- Sam Jay as Sam Jay
- Tawny Newsome as Pam
- Chris Farah as Pam
- James Adomian as Tony
- Mary Grill as Firefighter
- Kurt Braunohler as Daniel
- Mary Lynn Rajskub as herself
- Tess Paras as Miranda
- Marcella Arguello as Waitress
- Ahmed Bharoocha as Jimmy the delivery guy
- Paul F. Tompkins as himself
- Daniel Lee as Dean Smith's receptionist
- Ele Woods as Tatiana
- Seth Morris as Guitar owner
- Ron Funches as Himself
- Brittani Nichols as Bethani
- Irene Tu as Jamie
- Riley Silverman as Regan
- Clea DuVall as an audience member
- Tegan and Sara as wedding guests

== 2017 campaign to save Take My Wife ==
On August 9, 2017, it was announced that NBC would be shutting down Seeso. A web campaign to "#SaveTakeMyWife" quickly formed to encourage another network or streaming service to pick up the show for future seasons. On March 5, 2018, it was announced that the distribution rights to the first two seasons had been picked up for the Starz app and that both seasons were now available on iTunes.

== Episodes ==
=== Season 1 (2016) ===
No. overall	No. in season	Title	Directed by	Written by	Original release date
1	1	"Set-up"	Sam Zvibleman	Cameron Esposito	August 11, 2016
2	2	"Punchline"	Sam Zvibleman	Shauna McGarry	August 11, 2016
3	3	"Applause Break"	Sam Zvibleman	Gretchen Enders and Caitlin Gill	August 11, 2016
4	4	"Opener"	Sam Zvibleman	Shauna McGarry and Cooper Johnson	August 11, 2016
5	5	"Feature"	Sam Zvibleman	Gretchen Enders	August 11, 2016
6	6	"Headliner"	Sam Zvibleman	River Butcher	August 11, 2016

=== Season 2 (2018) ===
No. overall	No. in season	Title	Directed by	Written by	Original release date
7	1	"Episode 201"	Ingrid Jungermann, Cat Solen, and Scott Aukerman	Cameron Esposito	March 5, 2018
8	2	"Episode 202"	Ingrid Jungermann and Cat Solen	Jess Lacher	March 5, 2018
9	3	"Episode 203"	Ingrid Jungermann, Cat Solen, and Scott Aukerman	Claire Mulaney	March 5, 2018
10	4	"Episode 204"	Ingrid Jungermann	Brittani Nichols	March 5, 2018
11	5	"Episode 205"	River Butcher	River Butcher	March 5, 2018
12	6	"Episode 206"	Ingrid Jungermann	Jessica Gao	March 5, 2018
13	7	"Episode 207"	Ingrid Jungermann and Cat Solen	Jess Lacher	March 5, 2018
14	8	"Episode 208"	Ingrid Jungermann	Jessica Gao	March 5, 2018
