= Sapphire Gentlemen's Club =

American chain of strip clubs

Sapphire Gentlemen's Club is a chain of strip clubs.

== Las Vegas ==
The Las Vegas club is located in Winchester, Nevada, United States, a part of the Las Vegas Valley. The 71,000 sq ft (6,600 m^{2}) enterprise includes 10 VIP sky boxes and three lounges, and is billed as the world's largest nightclub. It was sold in 2006 for US$80 million in an auction to one of the two former part-owners.

In 2013 Sapphire Las Vegas opened the Sapphire Pool & Dayclub located at the south end of the club. The Sapphire Pool and Dayclub has 10 cabanas and 5 bungalows. The 10 cabanas are located on the main deck and has 2 pools. 1 of the 2 pools is available as a "private pool" package on the website. The 5 bungalows are located on the upper VIP area and includes a private pool area.

Sapphire used to host Men of Sapphire, the only male-choreographed revue show with a private show room for women only with lush VIP seating and premium alcohol as well as the Sapphire Comedy Hour featuring national headliners like comedian Jade Esteban Estrada.

This establishment was featured in the season 2 finale of Not Safe with Nikki Glaser where Nikki Glaser purportedly spent 24 hours there.

== New York City ==
The New York City club is at East 60th Street, the site of the former Scores gentlemen's club. On March 26, 2009 it was reported that the club had invited Australian Prime Minister Kevin Rudd and his wife, Thérèse Rein, to attend a private dinner whilst on his visit to the US. The Prime Minister's office declined to comment on the invitation. This followed the report that he had visited Scores in September 2003 with New York Post editor Col Allan and Labor back bencher Warren Snowdon. At the time, Rudd was the Opposition Foreign Affairs spokesman and did not have a "completely clear recollection" of the visit, stating he had "drunk a fair bit". The revelation did not have an adverse effect on his standing in the opinion polls but he distanced himself from the event none-the-less.

== See also ==
- List of strip clubs
