= Adam Ruins Everything =

American comedy television series (2015–2019)

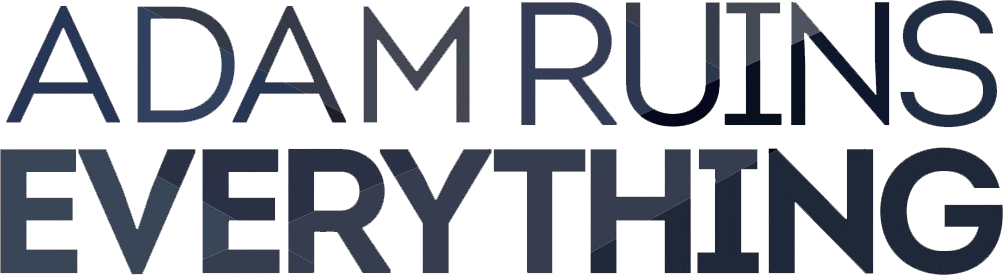
- Genre: Comedy; Educational television
- Created by: Adam Conover
- Developed by: CollegeHumor
- Directed by: Paul Briganti; Tim Wilkime; Laura Murphy; Matthew Pollock
- Starring: Adam Conover
- Theme music composer: Jesse Novak
- No. of seasons: 3
- No. of episodes: 65 (list of episodes)

Production
- Executive producers: Jon Cohen; Adam Conover; Spencer Griffin; Sam Reich; Jon Wolf
- Producers: Jeremy Reitz; Dave Oberg
- Cinematography: Matt Garrett
- Editors: James Fitzpatrick; Kent Kincannon
- Camera setup: Single camera
- Production companies: Big Breakfast; Fair Point; CollegeHumor

Original release
- Network: TruTV
- Release: September 29, 2015 – October 1, 2019

Adam Ruins Everything is an American educational comedy television series starring Adam Conover that ran from 2015 through 2019 on TruTV. The series endeavors to debunk common misconceptions held by the public on a variety of topics.

== Premise ==
Adam Ruins Everything is based on a CollegeHumor web series of the same name, and stars comedian Adam Conover; Conover himself said that he was inspired to produce the webseries based on interesting feedback from a stand-up bit based on "Have You Ever Tried to Sell a Diamond?", Edward Jay Epstein's article on the February 1982 issue of The Atlantic highlighting De Beers' aggressive campaign promoting diamonds as an important cultural item. Each episode begins with an ordinary person going about their daily lives before stating a common misconception regarding a certain topic. Usually, the person in question is recurring cast member comedian Emily Axford. Adam appears seemingly out of nowhere, introduces himself, and informs the other character and the audience about the misconceptions related to the character's statement. This dialogue serves as a springboard to a more in-depth discussion of commonly held beliefs and falsehoods related to that topic, in which Adam provides historical background to explain how the ideas in question became popularized, introducing real-life experts who explain these details, and citing peer-reviewed science studies and other empirical sources from which the information is derived. When he does this, the citations briefly appear onscreen.

Information is presented via the use of sketch characters, time travel, and animated segments, sometimes to the annoyance of the other character. At the end of the show's third act, the other characters' frustration will reach a critical point, prompting them to feel demoralized and disempowered. In the fourth act, however, Adam responds with a "positive takeaway", explaining how the new knowledge that has been provided can provide a solution to the situation, and explaining how the characters and viewers can do their part to improve society and their lives.

The first season featured interstitial segments titled "Ever Wonder Why?", which briefly explored subjects unrelated to the episode's main topic. The second season replaced these segments with extended, out-of-character interviews with the show's experts. In season three, these were replaced with new segments in which Emily talks about other subjects related to the main topic.

In 2016, TruTV aired "The Adam Ruins Everything Election Special", which took a historical look at the American presidency and election system and was filmed before a live audience in Los Angeles, California.

== Cast ==
- Adam Conover as himself, the series protagonist who serves as the guide for the audience and the secondary character of the episode. The reason he ruins popular ideas for people is because he believes that knowing the truth is always better. His social skills are somewhat limited by his need to bring up uncomfortable facts, and he constantly annoys Emily and other people with his "ruins", but Emily nonetheless becomes his friend and confidant. For instance, in "Adam Ruins the Future", she counsels him on his relationship with Melinda, and he improves his judgment as to when not to ruin an idea expressed by a complete stranger.
- Emily Axford as herself, a teacher who is Adam's friend despite being a frequent target of his debunking and is more on Adam's level: she will occasionally preempt Adam in debunking a false idea, such as in "Adam Ruins Sex" and "Adam Ruins Malls". In "Emily Ruins Adam", she hosts the episode that corrects past episodes' Adam's mistakes. She also has her own personal segments.
- Amos Vernon as Uncle Sam, a reoccurring character in Adam's explanations who resides in Americatown when not needed. He once ends up on the receiving end of Adam's debunking over his views on American greatness in "Adam Ruins America".
- Brian K. Murphy as Murph, a high school PE/health teacher who eventually marries Emily and is a friend to Adam. His personal life events provides fodder for Adam's "ruins".
- Hayley Marie Norman as Hayley, Emily's friend who dates Adam before she is killed off in "Adam Ruins Death".
- Veronica Osorio as Veronica, one of Emily's friends and an animal lover.
- River Butcher (Note: Known as Rhea Butcher during the production and airing of the show. Butcher came out as a trans man in 2021.) as Rhea Conover, a public defender and Adam's younger sister, with whom Adam temporarily lives after he loses his home. The character debuted in "Adam Ruins Football".
- Nicole Roberts as Kendra Perkins, a former prisoner and a friend of both Emily and Adam. She acted as Adam's co-host in her debut episode "Adam Ruins Prison".
- Punam Patel as Melinda, Adam's girlfriend, beginning in the episode "Emily Ruins Adam". She and Adam met online while editing the same Wikipedia page. In "Adam Ruins Conspiracy Theories", she expresses credence in Moon landing conspiracy theories, which Adam then "ruins". She and Adam end their relationship in "Adam Ruins the Future".
- RuPaul as Gil, Melinda's boss at a luxurious water fountain company. He is introduced in "Adam Ruins His Vacation" and reappears in "Adam Ruins the Future".
- Chris Parnell as the narrator of the six-part animated Reanimated History episodes.

=== Other ===
These actors appear in featured roles, often as historical figures that help illustrate the origins of the ideas that Adam scrutinizes.

- Adam Lustick
- Eliza Skinner
- Mike Trapp
- Dan Hewitt Owens
- John Ennis

== Production ==
On January 7, 2016, it was announced that the show had been picked up for 14 additional episodes to air starting on August 23, 2016. An hour-long election special was later produced. On December 7, 2016, truTV announced the renewal of Adam Ruins Everything for a 16-episode season, which premiered on July 11, 2017. An additional miniseries of six animated episodes premiered on March 20, 2018, subtitled Reanimated History. On May 9, 2018, TruTV announced that the show had been renewed for 10 more episodes and would return in late 2018. On July 8, 2019, it was announced that eight additional Season 3 episodes would air, beginning on August 13, 2019.

On December 1, 2020, Conover confirmed the show's conclusion on his website while announcing the development of a new original series for Netflix called The G Word. On January 18, 2022, Conover revealed that the show was canceled in late 2019 following job cuts and other cost-cutting measures that affected TruTV in the aftermath of AT&T's 2018 acquisition of Time Warner.

== Reception ==
Adam Ruins Everything has received positive reviews from critics. Reviewing the series premiere, The New York Times reviewer Neil Genzlinger wrote, "Adam Conover's new television series isn't the first dedicated to the fine art of debunking, but it's one of the most entertaining." Reviewing the second season, The Wall Street Journal critic John Anderson wrote, "In short, he's irritating. But he owns it. Which makes his quasi-educational comedy series so goofily endearing." Writing in Fast Company, Christine Champagne described Conover as "the lovechild of Debbie Downer and the coolest, most contrarian college professor you ever had."

TruTV president Chris Linn stated in a 2018 interview that the show is "a breakout hit" for the network, and that TruTV's research has found that viewer "sentiment is overwhelmingly positive, even for people who don't agree with [Conover]. They appreciate his approach."

Reviews have praised Adam Ruins Everything's ability to encourage critical thinking and change its minds using comedy and facts, even when viewers have strongly-held beliefs to the contrary. Writing in the Pacific Standard, Andy Dehnart said:

While one show may not singlehandedly slow society's metastasizing ignorance or save critical thinking, it does offer a highly effective model for overcoming the roadblocks between our brains and reality... There is so much resistance to having our ideological and filter bubbles popped that we protect them and fight off any perceived threats. But instead of coming at our bubbles with sharp swords of facts and judgment, Adam Conover sidles up in his own bubble, tells us a story, mocks himself, and lays out some facts. He's humble, informed, and human. With that combination, he's demonstrating a formula we might all use to attract, not repel, each other.

Adam Ruins Everything has found use by educators in the classroom. In a paper entitled "Adam Ruins Everything, Except Economics", Pennsylvania State University teaching professors Jadrian Wooten and James Tierney wrote that "Adam Ruins Everything touches on many economics topics that are relevant to introductory-level courses" and went on to describe how segments from the show could be used to teach concepts in economics.

=== Criticism ===
Writing in The Verge, Sean O'Kane criticized the episode "Adam Ruins Going Green"'s representation of a report on electric cars by Slate magazine. He wrote:

When Conover makes this crucial argument in the video, he cites a piece written by Slate's senior technology writer Will Oremus in 2013–a piece that's more about the difficulty of parsing all this information than it is about how electric cars might be dirty. What's more, Oremus spends a large chunk of his article explaining that how 'clean' your electric car is will vary depending on where you live, because different parts of the country use different percentages of these fuel sources to generate electricity.

A similar argument against the episode was leveled by Fred Lambert of the pro-EV publication Electrek. Adam Conover and researcher Peter Miller released a response to O'Kane's op-ed, in which they stated:

Unfortunately, while the rise of EVs is an encouraging trend, the evidence shows that in many cases replacing an efficient working car with an EV like a Tesla will actually increase your carbon footprint. O'Kane's piece presents no evidence that refutes this. In fact, behind the strong words, O'Kane affirms nearly every major point from our segment, and he argues against points we do not actually make.

The episode "Emily Ruins Adam Ruins Everything" functioned as a "corrections" episode, in which Conover and Axford revealed and discussed factual errors the show made over the preceding season. In this episode, Conover stood by the facts presented in the "Going Green" episode but argued that the presentation could have been clearer, stating, "If that many people misread our argument, we should have done a better job explaining it."

Mai Thi Nguyen-Kim, a chemist and science journalist working for Germany's public broadcasting, criticized a portion of the episode "Adam Ruins Science" about animal testing for making what she called misleading claims about scientists and misquoting sources.

== Episodes ==
Season	Episodes		Originally released	
Season	Episodes		First released	Last released
1	26	12	September 29, 2015	December 22, 2015
1	26	14	August 23, 2016	December 27, 2016
2	26	16	July 11, 2017	November 7, 2017
2	26	6	March 20, 2018	April 24, 2018
2	26	4	November 27, 2018	December 18, 2018
3	12	4	January 8, 2019	January 29, 2019
3	12	8	August 13, 2019	October 1, 2019

== International broadcast ==
In Canada, the series premiered on January 12, 2017, on Much. The series is broadcast on SBS Viceland in Australia. The series premiered on Netflix for the United States on September 30, 2018.
