= Higashiyama Sky Tower =

Coordinates: 35°9′24.624″N 136°58′42.744″E

- 東山スカイタワー (Higashiyama sukaitawā)
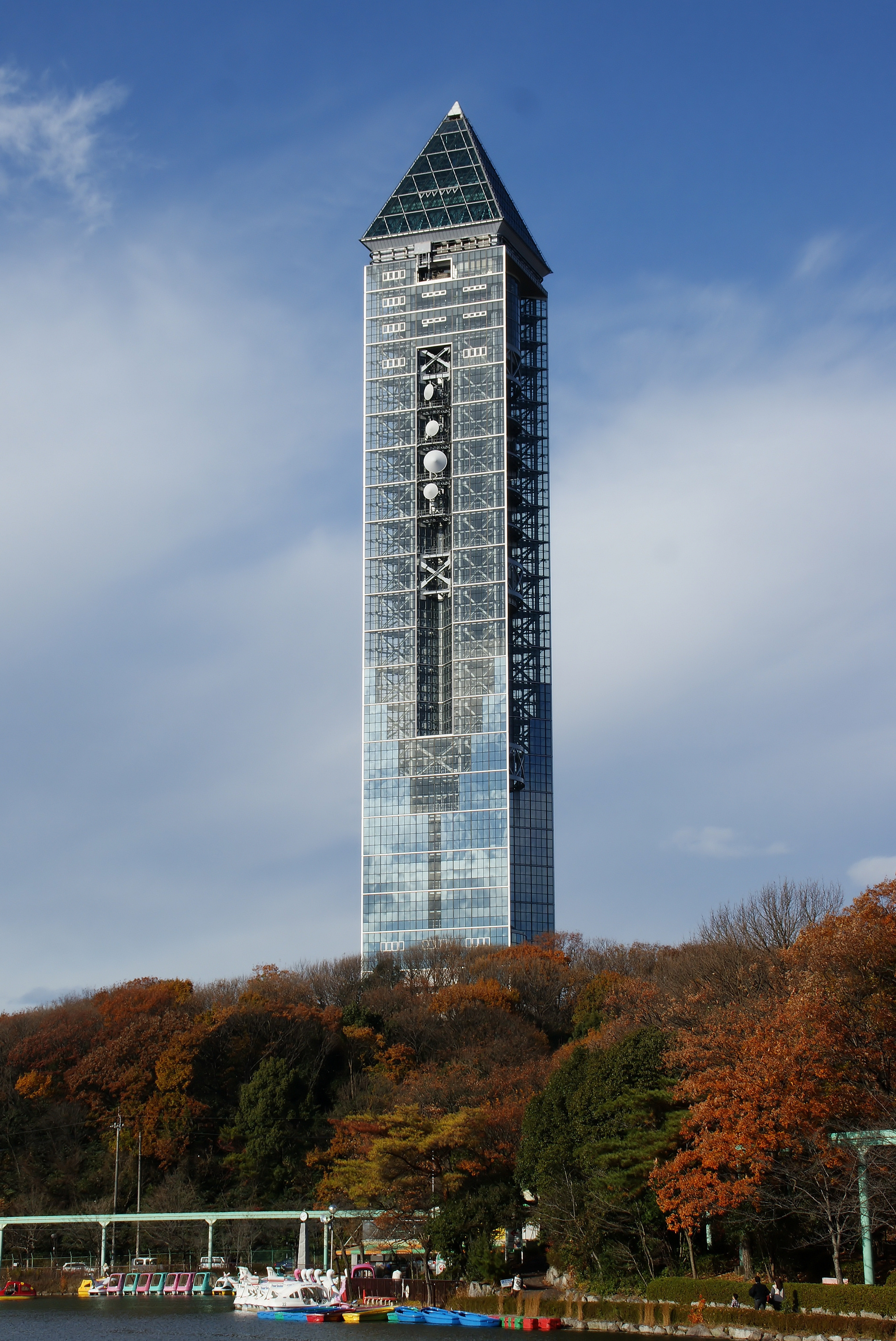
- Higashiyama Sky Tower

General information
- Type: Observation tower
- Location: Kameiri-1-8 Tashirocho, Chikusa-ku, Nagoya, Aichi Prefecture
- Completed: 11 July 1989
- Owner: Sanei Co., Ltd.

Height
- Architectural: 134 m (440 ft)

Technical details
- Floor count: 7 above ground

The Higashiyama Sky Tower is a pencil-shaped building located in the Higashiyama Zoo and Botanical Gardens in the city of Nagoya, central Japan. It contains observation decks and a restaurant 100 metres above ground.

== History ==
The Higashiyama Sky Tower was built on 11 July 1989 to commemorate the 100th anniversary of Nagoya.

In addition to its tourist use as an observatory, it also plays an important role in disaster prevention, as it is equipped with equipment such as 14 parabolic antennas and emergency radios, as well as high-altitude surveillance cameras.
