= Shabani (gorilla) =

Gorilla residing in Japan (born 1996)

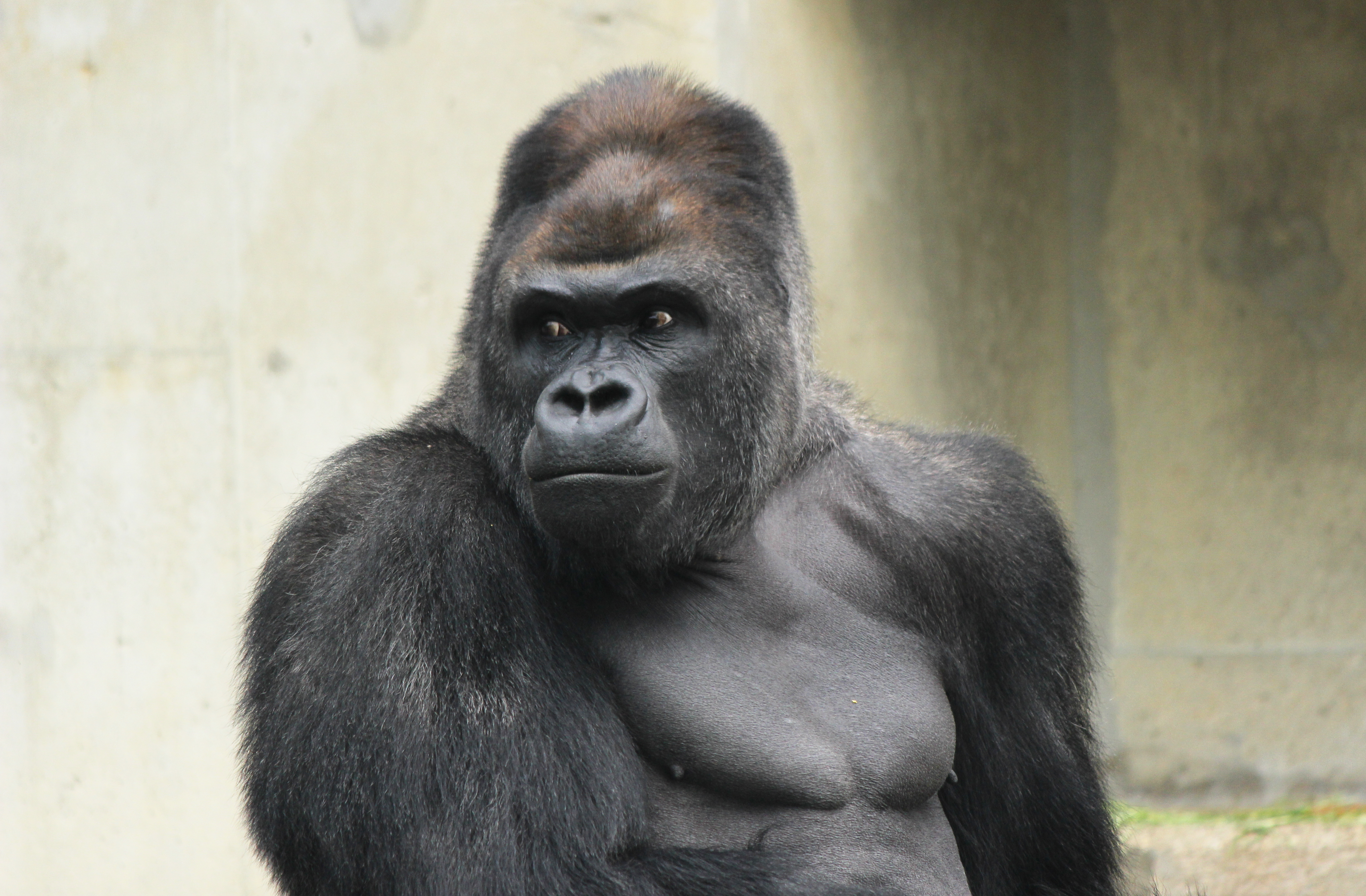
- Sex: Male
- Born: October 20, 1996 (age 30); Apenheul Primate Park, Apeldoorn, Netherlands
- Known for: "Ikemen Gorilla"; The most handsome gorilla Tightrope walking
- Residence: Higashiyama Zoo and Botanical Gardens, Nagoya, Japan
- Parents: Kibabu (father); Mouila (mother)
- Mates: Nene; Ai
- Offspring: Kiyomasa (male); Annie (female)
- Weight: 190 kg (418 lb)
- Height: 180 cm (71 in)

Shabani (born 20 October 1996) is a male western lowland gorilla, born at the Apenheul Primate Park in the Netherlands, raised in Australia and currently residing at the Higashiyama Zoo in Nagoya, Japan. He gained publicity in 2007 at Higashiyama Zoo when he was 10 years old by tightrope walking.

Shabani was the subject of further media attention in 2015, described as "handsome", "sexy", "photogenic", and "metrosexual". This led to significant news coverage, and an appearance on the season 2 premiere of the TV series Not Safe with Nikki Glaser.

The coverage caused an increase in younger female visitors to his zoo. Shabani was also the subject of a DVD film, and became the mascot for a brand of candy. He was also used in a worker recruitment campaign by the city of Nagoya in January 2016.

== Biography ==
=== Birth and early life ===
Shabani is a male western lowland gorilla (gorilla gorilla gorilla) born on 20 October 1996 at Apenheul Primate Park in the Netherlands. His mother is Mouila, and his father is Kibabu. Mouila was born in Cameroon to wild parents. Her birth year is recorded as 1972; although her capture date is unknown she arrived at Apenheul on November 22, 1974. Kibabu was born at Howletts Wild Animal Park on 25 May 1977. Kibabu's parents were Baby Doll and Kisoro. Kibabu was transferred from Howletts to Apenheul on 5 August 1987. Shabani was transferred to Taronga Zoo in Sydney, Australia along with the rest of his family on 6 December 1996, when he was almost seven weeks old. Shabani has four other full siblings.

- Bauwi, male, born on 10 July 1990. He was given euthanasia due to rapidly deteriorating health on 13 May 2023 at Burgers' Zoo and Safaripark, Arnhem, Netherlands.
- Haoko, male, born on 21 August 1993, currently living at Ueno Zoological Gardens in Tokyo, Japan.
- M'Beli, female, born on 5 February 2003, currently living at Taronga Zoo in Sydney, Australia.
- Mahali, male, born on 18 August 2008. He died on 14 May 2021 at Orana Wildlife Park in Christchurch, New Zealand.

Kibabu fathered 18 children.

=== Transfer to Higashiyama Zoo & Botanical Gardens ===
On 27 June 2007, Shabani and his brother Haoko were transferred to Japan as part of a coordinated breeding programme to ensure genetic diversity. While Shabani was transferred to Higashiyama Zoo in Nagoya, Haoko was sent to Ueno Zoological Gardens in Tokyo. Shabani was almost 11 years old and was still considered a "blackback". Blackbacks are aged between 8 and 12 years and lack silver back hair.

=== Shabani's troop ===
Higashiyama Zoo had three adult female gorillas with no male gorilla. The previous silverback, Rikki, had died in 2003. The female gorillas at Higashiyama Zoo were:

- Oki (born c. 1956 in the wild, died on 30 December 2010): Oki was around 53 years old when Shabani arrived and died 3 years later. They did not have offspring.
- Nene (born c. 1972 in Cameroon): Nene had one child, Ai, by Rikki.
- Ai (born 27 February 2003)

The first female to get pregnant by Shabani was Ai, who was nine years old at the time. She gave birth on 15 March 2012, but the baby died soon after.

On 1 November 2012, Nene gave birth to a healthy male. Following a request for suggestions for a name from the public, he was named Kiyomasa, after Katō Kiyomasa, a Japanese feudal lord of the late 16th century.

Ai became pregnant for a second time, and gave birth to a female infant on 2 June 2013. She was named Annie by combining the names "Ai" and "Shabani". Ai failed to properly take care of Annie and she was taken from the troop to be raised by the zoo staff.

On 31 March 2014, Annie was moved from the nursery to a room next to the gorilla house, where she could see, smell and hear the other gorillas. There were bars between the rooms that allowed for close contact; Shabani and Kiyomasa spent the most time interacting with Annie.

Zoo staff next opened a small door so that only Kiyomasa could enter Annie's room to play with her. Shabani spent hours at the little door looking into Annie's room. On 2 May 2014, Ai and Annie were reunited in a room by themselves, which had a small door for Annie to pass through to and from her private room. Ai and Annie were allowed to bond alone until 20 October 2014, when Shabani was moved in. The whole troop was finally reunited on 10 November 2014.

== Attributes ==
=== Personality ===
Shabani is thought to be particularly sensitive. When he first arrived in Nagoya the stress of the move and the experience of being among unfamiliar gorillas led him to acquire the nickname "tyrant" among the zoo staff. However, after Kiyomasa and Annie were born he was renamed "ruler of virtue".

When Shabani started attracting larger crowds of female fans he withdrew from the outside and started spending more time indoors. The zoo then put up signs asking visitors to refrain from yelling "Shabani", which was making him uncomfortable.

Shabani's favorite food is eggplant.

=== Behavior ===
According to zoo spokesperson Takayuki Ishikawa, Shabani's paternal behaviour is among the characteristics that make him attractive to women: "He's a father and he always protects and looks over his children. Zoo-goers think his kindness is attractive too".

Shabani exhibited protective behaviour towards Annie from her birth, even though Annie was raised by human caretakers. Yasushi Shibuya, a spokesperson for Higashiyama Zoo, said that when Annie began living together with the rest of the troop, there was a period where Nene would attack Annie. Shibuya speculated that this Nene perceived Annie as a threat to her son Kiyomasa, who was seven months older. In response, Shabani rushed into the room quickly to protect Annie as soon as he heard her screaming.

=== Skills ===
In 2007, when Shabani was 10 years old, he received initial media attention for tightrope walking. According to Hiroshi Kobayashi, head of Higashiyama Zoo, the ropes were installed for the gorillas to hang from them. However, Shabani started using them for balancing and walking.

On 15 August 2010, one of Shabani's keepers placed a couple of banana pieces high on the wall of the outdoor enclosure to see how high Shabani would jump to get it. Shabani was 13 years old at the time and weighed 418 lb (190 kg). Photos of the jump were taken and the height measured afterwards. The jump on this day was measured at 2 ft 7.5 in (80 cm). On 27 September 2015, a video was posted on YouTube showing Shabani making another high jump to reach leaves on the wall.

== Popularity ==
=== Media coverage ===
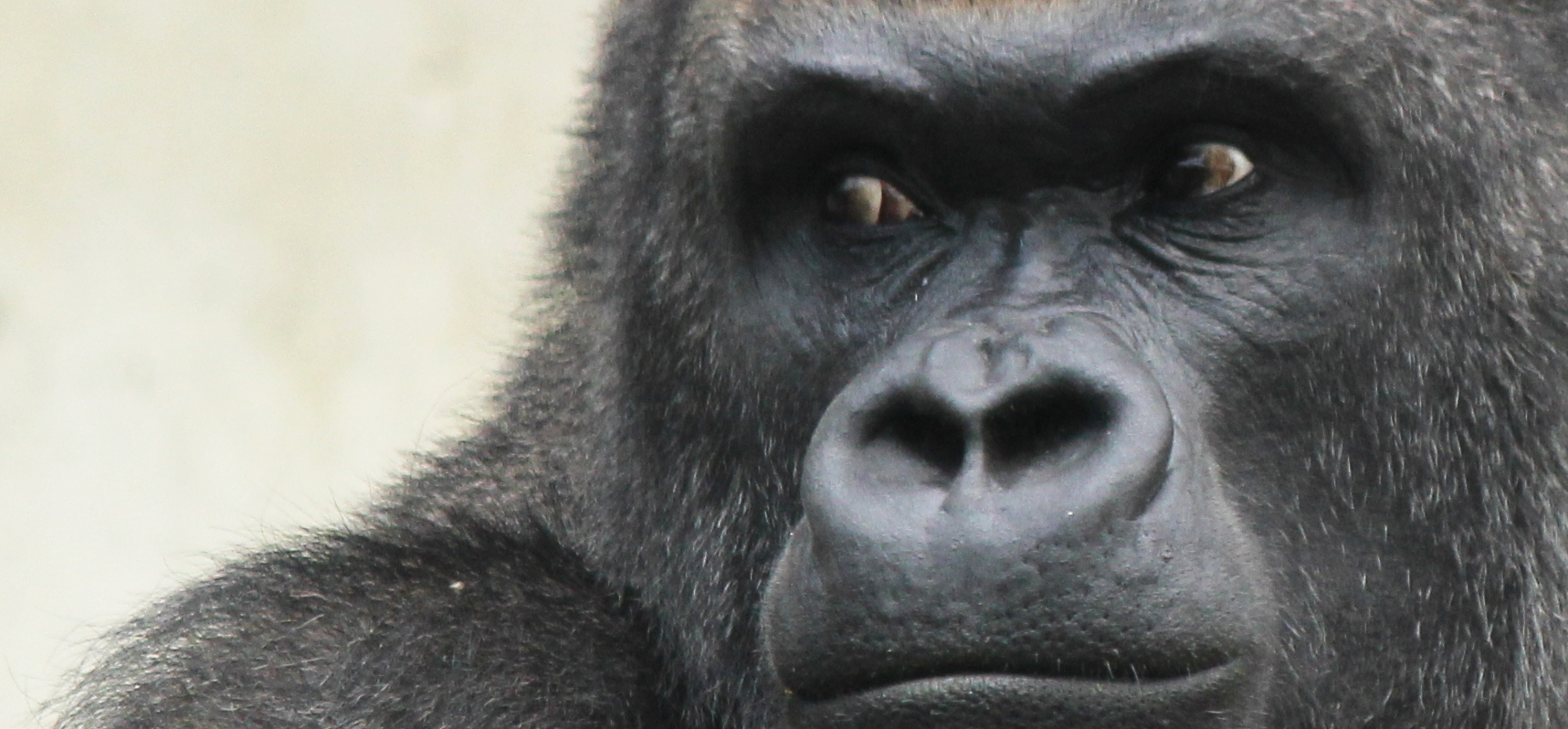
While not unique, the whites of Shabani's eyes are unusual, giving him a more human quality than other gorillas.

After Shabani started trending on Twitter, news reports about the "handsome gorilla" appeared in the international media, including CNN, BBC, The Daily Telegraph, News.com.au, and ET Online, among others. As a result of his popularity, the City of Nagoya, owner of the Higashiyama Zoo, registered the terms "Shabagni" and "Shabani" as trademarks on 23 September 2016. As of October 2016, 150 items of merchandise related to Shabani and authorized goods such as towels, sweets and stationery have been produced. The sales of these goods account for 4-50% of Higashiyama Zoo and Botanical Gardens' total product sales.

=== Advertising ===
- Shabani was included in a special edition movie poster of the movie Tarzan Reborn released only in Japan.
- Adobe Systems Inc. released a font modeled after Shabani. The font includes capital alphabet and Arabic numerals. Five photos of Shabani were also released.
- Adobe signed a talent contract for Shabani with Higashiyama Zoo & Botanical Gardens for him to be the model of their image editing software in Japan as part of a Year of the Monkey campaign in 2016.
- On 4 January 2016, Nagoya City announced that it would use Shabani in a city employment recruitment campaign. The campaign included a four-minute video and posters.
- Meito Sangyo Co., Ltd. exhibited a large chocolate art piece from 19 January to 14 February 2017 at the Tokyu Hands Shibuya store's Valentine event, held to announce the release of the "Alphabet Chocolate Shabani Package".

=== Shabani Art ===
- Illustrator Yuki Tokuda was asked to make an illustration of Shabani with an Orenzu metal grip type. This illustration was released on 24 February 2016. A video was also released by the entertainment news magazine Fieldcaster.net with the artist explaining the process of drawing this illustration, which took 20 hours to complete. Each hair was individually drawn.
- In April 2017, Legoland Japan made a sculpture of Shabani built entirely of Legos. The sculpture is built out of 40,000 Lego pieces, is 1.2 metres high, and weighs 100 kg (220 lbs.). The Lego sculpture was displayed for a time at the Crystal Square of the underground Sakae Mall in Nagoya City until being donated to the Higashiyama Zoo and Botanical Gardens.
- The Japanese painter Chisato Abe, known for her gorilla paintings, made a painting of Shabani which was displayed at the zoo in May 2016.
- Artist James J. Choi modeled a ceramic sculpture after Shabani which was published on his website on 6 May 2018.
- DesignCrowd created a contest in which designers would alter pictures of Shabani using Photoshop for unofficial endorsements of global brands. The contest ended on 5 July 2015. The winning entry was a mock ad for Calvin Klein underwear.
- Artist Dominic Hurley sculpted a Shabani monument in Kilkenny black marble from a 5 tonne block, which was published on the website of London Fine Ltd in October 2019.

=== Books ===
- The Higashiyama Zoo and Botanical Gardens published an official Shabani Photo Album on 3 October 2015. Sales on Amazon exceeded 15,000 copies within one month, and ranked No. 1 best seller in three categories: Photography, Zoology, and Pet General.
- On 21 March 2016, Shabani was included in a photo collection called "Higashiyama Extinct Zoo" which was part of "The Extinct Zoo Project" at Higashiyama Zoo.
- On 21 September 2017, Higashiyama Zoo released a children's picture book entitled, "Shabani Daisuki".
- On the 80th anniversary of Higashiyama Zoo on 4 March 2017, a 144-page guidebook was published featuring a photo of Shabani and one of his children on the cover. Four pages inside the guide book were dedicated to the gorillas.

=== DVD ===
- The Higashiyama Zoo and Botanical Gardens released a DVD titled Ikemen Sugiru Gorilla, Shabani ("Shabani, the Gorilla Who's Just Too Hot"), on 22 December 2016. The video is narrated by Katayama, Kosuke.

=== Games ===
- In collaboration with Fuji Television Co., the zoo included Shabani as a special character in the games Thermae Romae Gacha and Mangrove and Mysterious Bears.

== See also ==
- List of individual apes
