= Cameron Esposito =

American actress and comedian (born 1981)

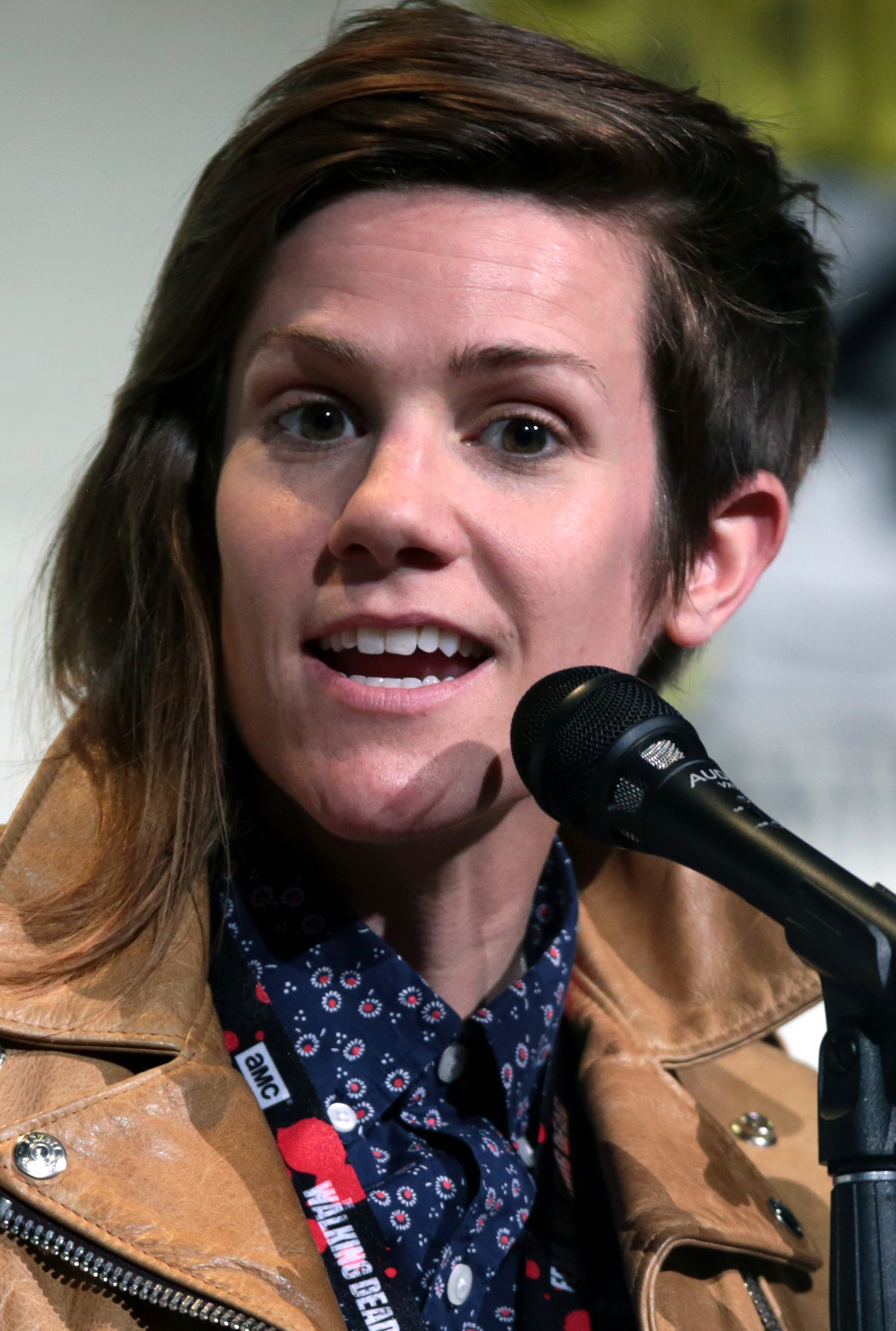
- Esposito at the 2016 San Diego Comic-Con
- Born: Cameron Anne Young Anastasia Esposito; October 17, 1981 (age 45); Western Springs, Illinois, U.S.
- Education: Boston College
- Occupations: Actress; comedian; podcaster
- Years active: 2007–present
- Spouses: River Butcher (m. 2015; div. 2018) Katy Nishimoto (m. 2021)
- Children: 1

Comedy career
- Medium: Stand-up; television; radio; internet
- Website: cameronesposito.com

Cameron Anne Young Anastasia Esposito (born October 17, 1981) is an American actress, comedian, and podcaster known for her (Note: Esposito uses both she/her and they/them pronouns and switches between them; this article uses she/her for consistency.) show Take My Wife, as well as her stand-up comedy and her podcast, Queery. Esposito substantially focuses on topics surrounding the LGBTQ+ community, feminism, social justice, and the challenges faced by members of marginalized communities.

== Early life ==
Born to Italian-American parents Brenda and Nick, Cameron Esposito was raised in Western Springs, Illinois. She is the middle of three children, having an older sister and a younger sister. In high school, Esposito swam breaststroke on the swim team, was a member of a community service group called The Marians Society, and was a semifinalist for the National Merit Scholarship Program. She graduated from Benet Academy in 2000.

Esposito studied theology and English literature at Boston College, intending to become a social worker in Chicago. While in Boston, she played rugby and performed in the school's improv troupe, My Mother's Fleabag. Esposito graduated from Boston College in 2004.

After returning to Illinois, Esposito began a Master of Social Work at the University of Chicago for one semester, before dropping out and deciding to pursue a different career.

== Career ==
=== Early stand-up career ===
Esposito began her stand-up career in Chicago, performing in various local venues, including as a regular at The Lincoln Lodge from 2007 to 2011. She has appeared at comedy festivals including SXSW, the Moontower, Bridgetown Comedy Festival, and SF Sketchfest. To supplement her income, she worked in special education, as a law clerk, and as a nanny.

=== 2013–present ===
In 2013, Esposito made her television debut on The Late, Late Show with Craig Ferguson. Fellow guest Jay Leno expressed admiration for Esposito, calling her "the future of comedy". She has appeared on Conan and on Last Call with Carson Daly. She voiced "Carroll the Cloud Person" on an episode of Cartoon Network's animated show Adventure Time. Entertainment website Consequence of Sound named Esposito its comedian of the year for 2014.

In the fall of 2014, Esposito created a series of videos with BuzzFeed Motion Pictures titled "Ask a Lesbian", in which she answers a variety of questions sent in to BuzzFeed staff about lesbianism. The videos also featured then-partner River Butcher. In addition to touring regularly, Esposito was a regular panelist on Chelsea Lately with Chelsea Handler and used to write a regular blog on The A.V. Club.

Esposito's comedy album Same Sex Symbol was released in December 2014 by Kill Rock Stars. She appeared on Comedy Central's Drunk History as a storyteller on October 20, 2015. Esposito co-hosted the stand-up comedy podcast Put Your Hands Together with River Butcher, which was recorded weekly in front of a live audience at the Upright Citizens Brigade Theater in Los Angeles from 2013 until July 2019.

Esposito is known for her lesbian content creation, especially hers and Butcher's television show Take My Wife, which streamed on Seeso until the service was discontinued in November 2017. In March 2018, Take My Wife was picked up by iTunes. The show was acquired by Starz in April 2018.

Esposito's podcast Queery is an interview-style podcast focusing on contemporary queer luminaries and their life experiences. Queery guests have included River Butcher, Lena Waithe, Tegan Quin, Sara Quin, Evan Rachel Wood, Joey Soloway, Mary Lambert, Andrea Gibson, Margaret Cho, Alia Shawkat, Roxane Gay, Trixie Mattel, and Lea DeLaria.

On June 11, 2018, Esposito released Rape Jokes, an hour-long standup special about sexual assault from her perspective. The special was free to stream on Esposito's website, but viewers could pay to download a copy and proceeds would benefit RAINN, the United States' largest anti-sexual violence organization. By September 2018, the special had raised $65,000 in donations.

On March 24, 2020, Esposito released her memoir Save Yourself. In 2025, Esposito was announced as a guest performer on the second season of the panel show Smartypants, on Dropout. Additionally, on March 21, 2025, Dropout announced a standup special featuring Esposito, titled Four Pills, as an exclusive release on April 11. In Four Pills, Esposito explored being diagnosed with bipolar disorder at the age of 40 years old. Four Pills is Esposito's directorial debut.

On May 1, 2025, it was revealed that Esposito would be a guest judge on the upcoming drag king competition show, King of Drag.

== Personal life ==
Esposito is openly lesbian and was married to fellow stand-up comedian River Butcher from 2015 to 2018. Butcher and Esposito collaborated on multiple projects, including the Put Your Hands Together stand-up show, the podcast Wham! Bam! Pow!, and the TV show Take My Wife.

In April 2021, Esposito came out on Twitter and Instagram as genderfluid, stating that she uses both she and they pronouns. In June 2021, Esposito announced via Twitter that she had married Katy Nishimoto, an editor for Dial Press. In August 2025, Esposito revealed via Instagram that they were expecting their first child. They documented their pregnancy in a collaboration with The Try Guys in a series of videos called "Call Them Mother".

== Filmography ==
=== Film ===
Year	Title	Role	Notes
2016	Sleight	Luna	
2016	First Girl I Loved	Jasmine	
2016	Operator	Chloe Johnston	
2016	Mother's Day	Max	
2017	The Hero	Herself	
2020	We Bare Bears: The Movie	Ranger Tabes (voice)	
2020	The Dark Divide	Monty	
2022	Moonshot	Tabby	

=== Television ===
Year	Title	Role	Notes
2013	The Late, Late Show with Craig Ferguson	Guest	1 episode
2014–2016	Last Call With Carson Daly	Guest	2 episodes
2014	Conan	Guest	1 episode
2014	Ask a Lesbian	Host	Web series
2014–2016	Maron	Zoe	5 episodes
2014–2017	Adventure Time	Carroll the Cloud Person (voice)	2 episodes
2015	Comedy Bang! Bang!	Server	Episode: "Maya Rudolph Wears a Black Skirt & Strappy Sandals"
2015	Drunk History	Herself	Episode: "Journalism"
2016	Bajillion Dollar Propertie$	Liz	Episode: "Roger Me Rightly"
2016–2018	Take My Wife	Cameron	14 episodes; also creator, writer, executive producer
2016–2019	We Bare Bears	Ranger Tabes (voice)	17 episodes
2017	Danger & Eggs	Rad (voice)	Episode: "Chill Twins/Nightmare"
2018	Big City Greens	Additional voices	Episode: "Parade Day/DIY Guys"
2019	Brooklyn Nine-Nine	Jocelyn Pryce	2 episodes
2020	The George Lucas Talk Show	Herself	Episode: "The Search for Watto"
2022–2023	A Million Little Things	Greta Strobe	Recurring
2022	Hell's Kitchen	Herself	guest diner; Episode "Breakfast 911"
2023	With Love	Chauncey	Episode: "Lily's Double Quinceañera"
2025	Dropout Presents	Herself	Episode: "Cameron Esposito: Four Pills"
2025	King of Drag	Herself; Guest judge	1 episode
2026	Crowd Control	Herself	Episode: “Lesbian Applause Break”

=== Albums ===
Year	Title	Label
2010	Grab Them Aghast	Rooftop Comedy Records
2015	Same Sex Symbol	Kill Rock Stars
2016	Marriage Material	Comedy Dynamics
2017	Back to Back	aspecialthing records
2018	Rape Jokes	aspecialthing records

=== Podcasts ===
Year	Title	Role
2013–2019	Put Your Hands Together	Host
2013–2015	Wham Bam Pow	Host
2013–present	Comedy Bang! Bang!	Guest
2014	My Brother, My Brother and Me	Guest
2014	You Made It Weird	Guest
2014–2016	How Did This Get Made?	Guest
2015	With Special Guest Lauren Lapkus	Guest
2015	The Nerdist Podcast	Guest
2016	Bad with Money	Guest
2017	Homophilia	Guest
2017–2018	Nancy	Guest
2017–2024	Queery	Host
2021	Morbid	Guest
2023	Survive or Die Trying	Host
2025	Alphabet Club	Guest

=== Online ===
Year	Title	Role	Notes
2018	Good Mythical Morning	Guest	
2026	The Try Guys	Guest	

=== Books ===
Year	Title	Publisher	ISBN	Notes
2020	Save Yourself	Grand Central Publishing	ISBN 978-1-4555-9144-2	Memoir
2021	Hungry Hearts: Essays on Courage, Desire, and Belonging (contributor)	The Dial Press	ISBN 978-0-593-22962-0	Essays
