= Sara Schaefer =

American stand-up comedian

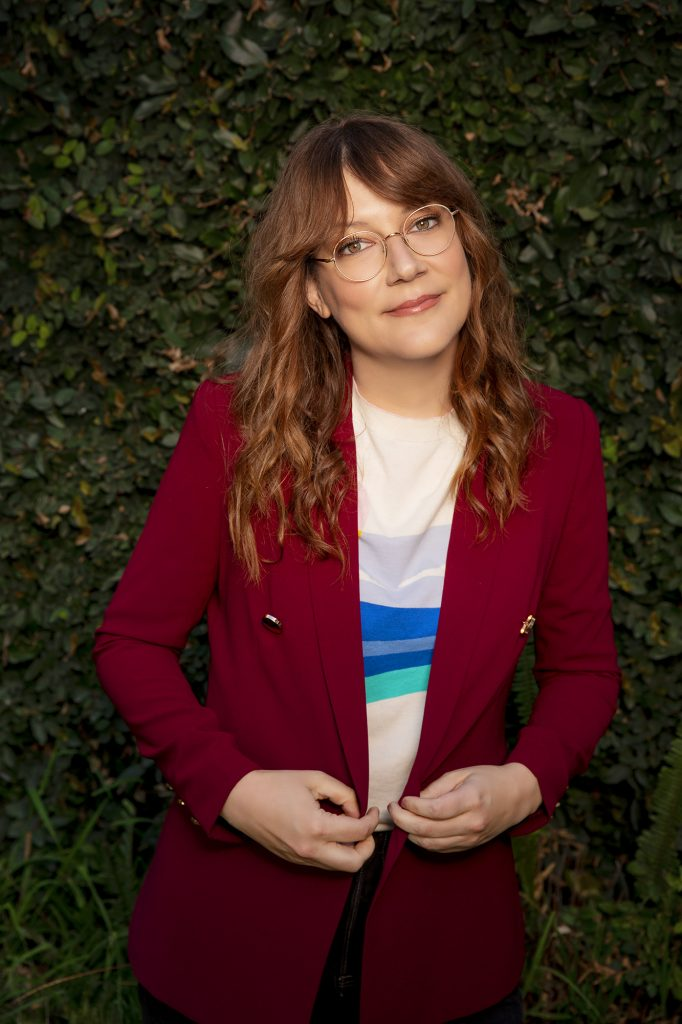
- Born: July 10, 1978 (age 48)
- Education: William & Mary
- Notable work: Nikki & Sara Live, Grand

Comedy career
- Medium: Stand-up, Podcasting, Television
- Website: http://saraschaefer.com/

Sara Schaefer (born July 10, 1978) is an American stand-up comedian, writer, and author.

== Personal life ==
Schaefer was raised in Midlothian, Virginia, the daughter of Billie and William "Bill" Schaefer. Her mother started the charity Pennies for Heaven, Inc. She attended Maggie Walker Governor's School, and went to college at William & Mary.

== Career ==
Following college, in 2000, Schaefer moved to New Orleans and participated in the theater scene. In 2001 Schaefer moved to New York City and began writing, producing and performing comedy. During that time she also worked as a damages analyst at a New York City law firm. In 2006 and 2007, she hosted an on-line comedy/music show for AOL called The DL, for which she made around 350 videos or segments with a varied assortment of noted and upcoming artists, musicians and performers, from Hulk Hogan and Aretha Franklin to Jimmy Fallon and Jamie Kennedy. In 2007, she was a featured performer at the HBO Comedy Arts Festival in Aspen, Colorado. In 2008, she was an editor for VH1's Best Week Ever blog. She has appeared on E!, VH-1, Fuse and Late Night with Jimmy Fallon. In 2009 New York Magazine named Schaefer one of the "Ten new comedians that funny people find funny."

She was the Head Blogger for Late Night with Jimmy Fallon from 2009 to 2011, for which she won the Emmy Award for Creative Achievement in Interactive Media (non-fiction) in both 2009 and 2010. In 2011 she wrote for the game show Who Wants to Be a Millionaire and was named one of the Huffington Post's "53 Favorite Female Comedians".

Sara's accolades include USA Today's "100 People of the Year in Pop Culture," Backstage Magazine Comics to Watch 2011, New York Post "Best Jests 2010," ECNY Award Nominee: Best Female Stand Up 2010, Comedy Central's Comics to Watch Showcase 2010, and New York Magazine's "10 Comedians to Watch" 2010.

From early 2011 to 2014, Schaefer hosted a podcast with comedian Nikki Glaser called You Had To Be There.

Nikki & Sara Live, a weekly talk show television series hosted by Schaefer and Glaser, premiered on January 29, 2013, on MTV. MTV cancelled the show after two seasons.

In 2013, Schaefer made her stand-up comedy television debut on John Oliver's New York Stand-Up Show. She has gone on to write for numerous television shows including Problematic with Moshe Kasher, The Fake News with Ted Nelms starring Ed Helms, The Mark Twain Prize for American Humor, and The History of Swear Words. In 2017, she created, produced and hosted the digital series Woman Online for Seriously.TV. Schaeffer's stand up show Little White Box debuted to a sold-out run at the 2017 Edinburgh Fringe Festival. Her scripted web series Day Job was named one of 100 Best Web Series by TimeOut New York. Her Comedy Central Stand-Up Presents half hour special aired in November 2019.

Schaefer's memoir Grand was published by Simon & Schuster imprint Gallery Books in August 2020.

== Filmography ==
Year	Title	Role	Notes
2005	Best Week Ever	Herself	
2006-07	The DL	Host	AOL Music web series
2006	Rise of the Geeks	Herself	TV documentary
2009	It's On with Alexa Chung	Herself	Episode #2.28
2012	A Different Spin with Mark Hoppus	Herself	
2012-13	Money From Strangers	Herself	Guest
2012-13	Big Morning Buzz Live	Panelist	Two episodes
2013	Nikki & Sara Live	Host	Co-hosted/creator with Nikki Glaser
2013	Totally Biased with W. Kamau Bell	Guest	
2013	Last Call with Carson Daly	Guest	
2013	Inside Amy Schumer	Friend #2	Episode 1: Bad Decisions
2013	John Oliver's New York Stand Up Show	Herself	Episode 4
2014-16	@midnight	Guest	Episodes #71, #100, #195 & #296
2016	Not Safe with Nikki Glaser	Herself	Episode 4
2017	Woman Online	Host	
2017	The Fake News With Ted Nelms	Mischa Horowtz	
2018	Comedy Knockout	Herself	
2018	The Fix	Herself	Episode 9
2019	Comedy Central Stand-Up Presents	Herself	Episode 12

== Work ==
Year	Title	Occupation
2008	www.bestweekever.tv	Associate Editor
2009-2011	Late Night with Jimmy Fallon	Head Blogger/Researcher
2011	Who Wants to Be a Millionaire	Writer
2012	2012 Primetime Creative Arts Emmy Awards	Writer
2012-2013	Money From Strangers	Prank consultant, guest
2013	Nikki & Sara Live	Writer, Host, Executive Producer
2016	Not Safe With Nikki Glaser	Writer
2017	Woman Online	Creator, Host, Executive Producer
2017	Problematic With Moshe Kasher	Writer
2017	The Fake News with Ted Nelms	Writer
2018	Mark Twain Prize for American Humor (Julia Louis-Dreyfus)	Writer
2019	Still Laugh-In: The Stars Celebrate	Writer
2020	Mark Twain Prize for American Humor (Dave Chappelle)	Writer
2020	Graduate Together: America Honors the High School Class of 2020	Writer
2020	Feeding America Comedy Festival	Producer
2020	Top Secret Videos	Producer
2021	History of Swear Words	Writer
