= Higashiyama Zoo and Botanical Gardens =

Coordinates: 35°9′30″N 136°58′40″E

Higashiyama Zoo and Botanical Gardens (東山動植物園, Higashiyama Dōshokubutsuen)
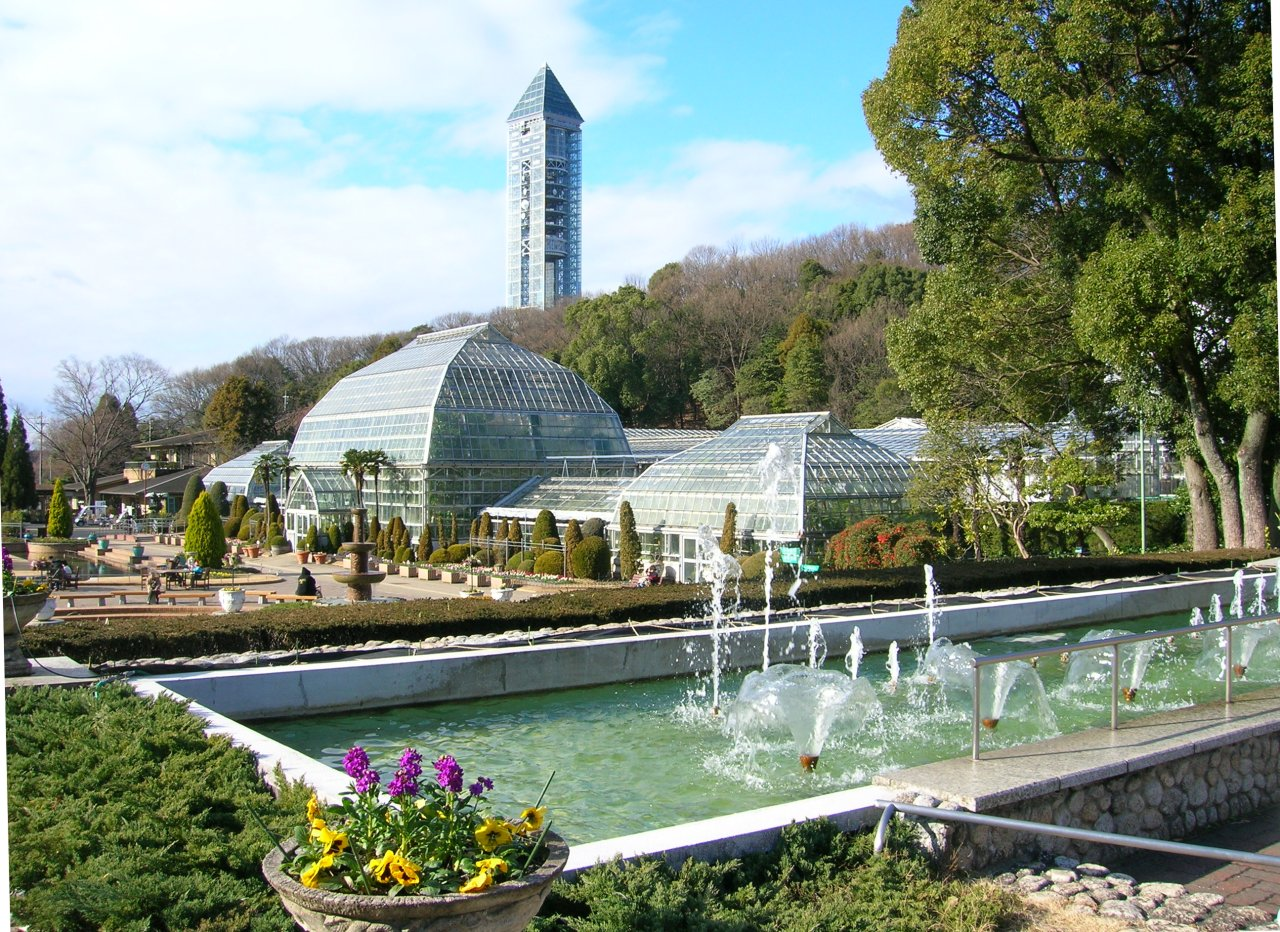
- Higashiyama Zoo and Botanical Gardens
- Interactive map of Higashiyama Zoo and Botanical Gardens (東山動植物園, Higashiyama Dōshokubutsuen)
- Date opened: 1937
- Location: Chikusa-ku, Nagoya, Japan
- No. of species: 450+
- Website: https://www.higashiyama.city.nagoya.jp/

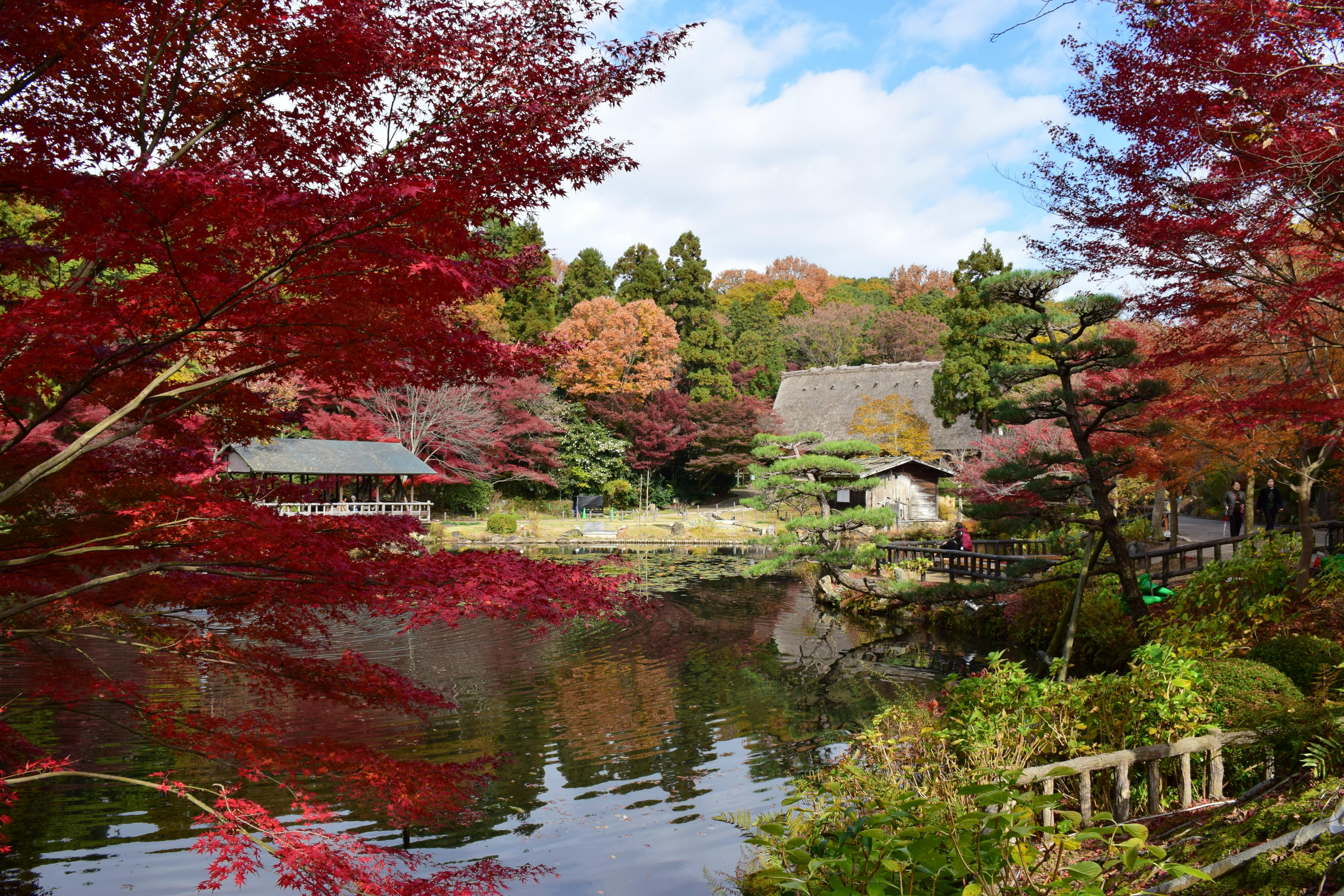
Botanical Gardens

The Higashiyama Zoo and Botanical Gardens (東山動植物園, Higashiyama Dōshokubutsuen) is a joint zoo and botanical garden located at Chikusa-ku, Nagoya, Japan. It is open every day except Monday, and charges a modest admission fee.

Established in 1937, the Higashiyama Zoo is one of Asia's largest attractions, featuring a botanical garden and an amusement park. The logo for the koala exhibit was designed by manga artist Akira Toriyama in 1984. It keeps more than 450 species, which is the largest number in Japan.

The botanical gardens feature wild flora, as well as a greenhouse, insect hall, and a Japanese garden. The Higashiyama Sky Tower allows visitors a view of Nagoya from its observation decks, and also features a restaurant 100 metres above ground.

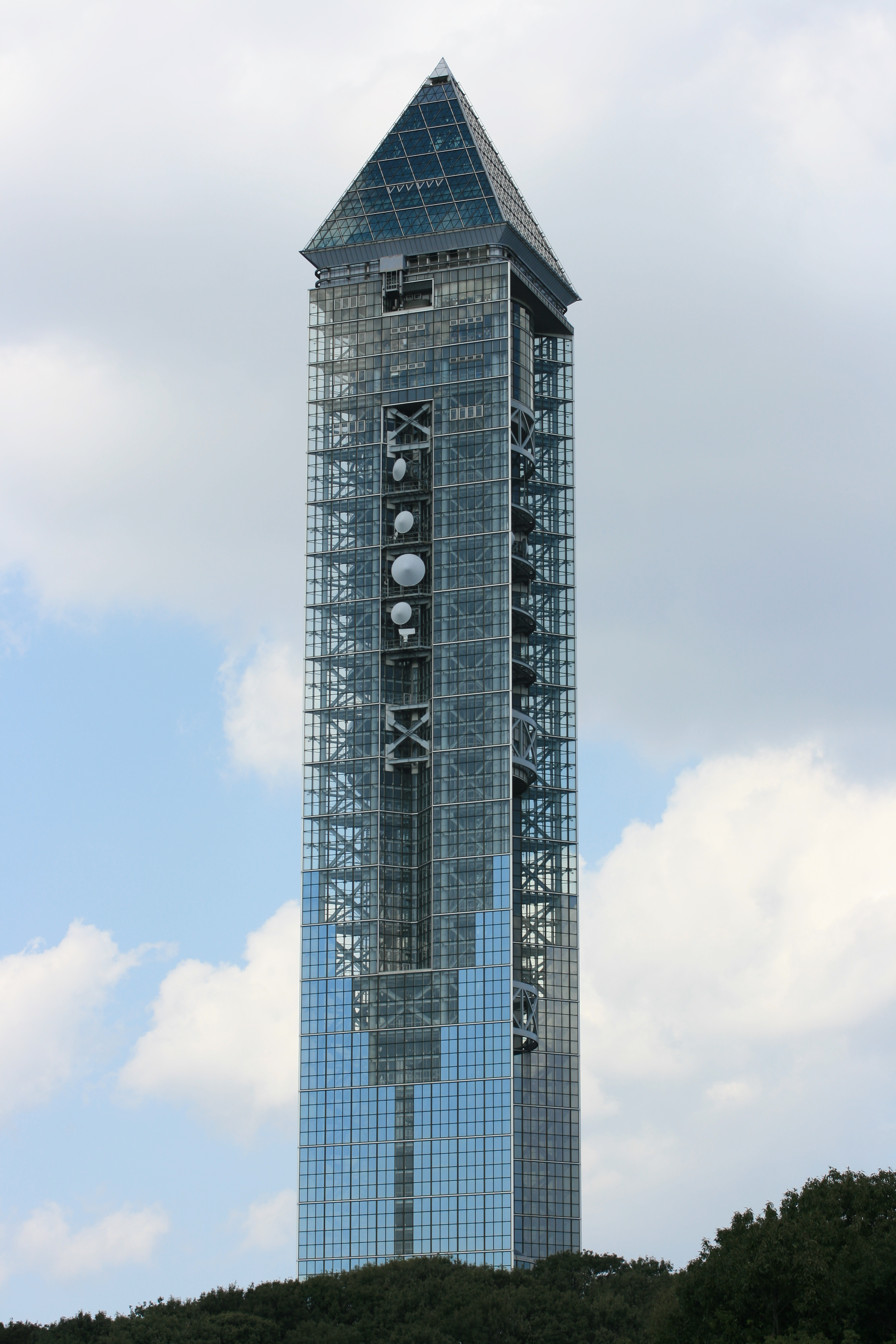
Higashiyama Sky Tower.

As of 2010, Higashiyama Zoo had the 2nd most annual park visits of any zoo in Japan, behind only the Ueno Zoo in Tokyo.

== Animals ==
The zoo's collection consists of 469 species.

- Zo-dium – One of the largest Asian elephant habitats in Japan.
- Bear House – A series of enclosures house four species of bears; Japanese black bears, Ussuri brown bears, sun bears and spectacled bears.
- Penguin House – The zoo has Humboldt penguins and southern rockhopper penguins in its collection.
- African Forest – This complex contains enclosures for chimpanzees and western lowland gorillas, including Shabani the gorilla.
- Koala House – The zoo has housed and successfully bred koalas due to its sister city relationship with Sydney.

Koalas at Higashiyama Zoo.

- Bird Hall – A walk-through aviary. Outside the building is an enclosure for ostriches.
- Fureai Hiroba – Visitors can interact with farm animals such as goats and sheep and small domestic animals such as rabbits and guinea pigs.
- Small Bird and Squirrel Forest – A small walk-through habitat with free-ranging Japanese squirrels and birds such as mandarin ducks and warbling white-eyes.
- Vivarium and Nocturnal House – Nocturnal animals are housed in the building's first floor while the zoo's amphibian and reptile collection are kept on the second floor. On the promenade connecting both floors is a habitat for Nile crocodiles.
- American Zone – This section houses North American animals such as bald eagles, American bison and timber wolves.
- Medaka World – An exhibition facility keeping native freshwater fish such as medaka.
- Other animals housed in the zoo include Indian rhinoceroses, Malayan tapirs, axis deer, red kangaroos, Chapman's zebras, American flamingos, Chilean flamingos, great white pelicans, lions, Sumatran tigers, Japanese serows, reticulated giraffes, polar bears, California sea lions, Japanese raccoon dogs, Japanese macaques, Tsushima leopard cats, Sumatran orangutans, African bush elephants, hippos, black rhinos, pygmy hippos, giant anteaters and capybaras.

=== Shabani ===
One of the zoo's silverback gorillas, Shabani received significant social media coverage in 2015, being termed as "handsome" and "metrosexual" by news media, leading to an increase in young female visitors to the zoo.

== See also ==
- List of botanical gardens in Japan
