= River Butcher =

American comedian, actor, writer, producer, and podcast host

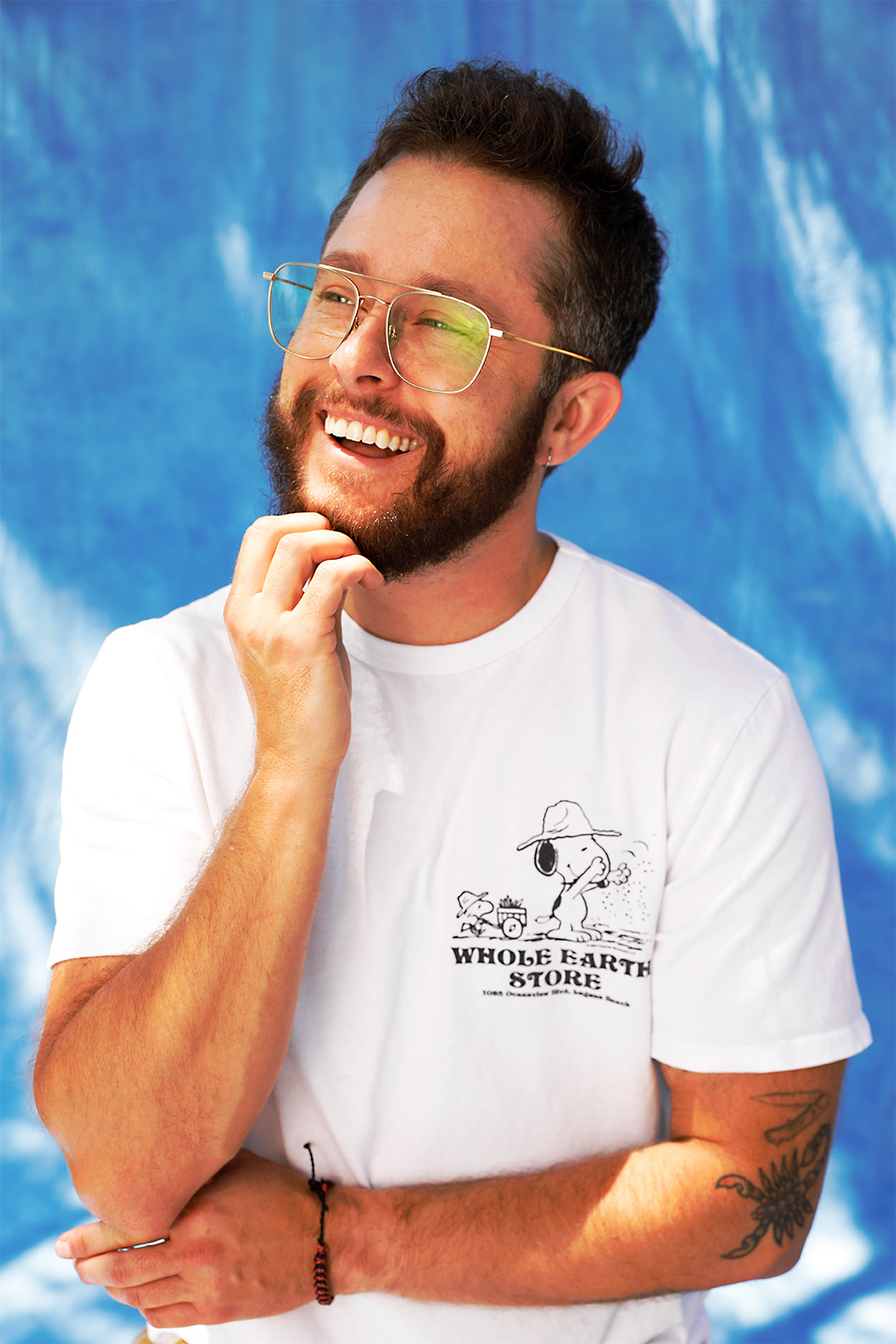
- River Butcher
- Born: August 12, 1982 (age 44); Akron, Ohio, U.S.
- Education: University of Akron
- Notable work: Take My Wife
- Spouse: Cameron Esposito (m. 2015; div. 2019)

Comedy career
- Years active: 2009–present
- Medium: Stand-up, television, podcast internet
- Website: riverbutcher.com

River Butcher (formerly Rhea Harriett Butcher; born August 12, 1982) is an American stand-up comedian, actor, writer, producer, and podcast host. He (Note: Butcher uses both he and they pronouns; this article uses he for consistency.) is best known for personal, observational comedy focused on his vegetarianism, feminism, love of baseball, and experiences as a queer person.

== Early life ==
Butcher was raised in the Kenmore neighborhood of Akron, Ohio, an only child whose parents divorced when Butcher was one month old. He attended Our Lady of the Elms High School and graduated from Archbishop Hoban High School in 2001.

While attending the University of Akron, Butcher worked at a skateboard shop named Summer Squall and an indoor skating facility called Joe's Skate Park, and helped design a skatepark that opened in Akron in 2001. He graduated from the University of Akron with a degree in printmaking in 2005. Butcher attended graduate school at University of Notre Dame.

In 2006, Butcher had an exhibit at a printmaker's show called "Prints at an Exposition". This exhibit, which was a series of prints on muslin showing the body's organs, was inspired by his own appendectomy.

== Comedy career ==
=== Early years ===
Butcher began his comedy career performing improv in Chicago at The Second City and has since performed stand-up at clubs including Zanies, the Jukebox, and Flappers, as well as Chicago Underground Comedy, The Hideout, The Lincoln Lodge, UCB, Cole's, and Meltdown. He made his late-night debut on Conan in June 2016.

=== 2014–present ===
In the fall of 2014, Butcher appeared alongside Cameron Esposito in a series of videos for BuzzFeed Motion Pictures titled "Ask a Lesbian". Butcher and Esposito also co-hosted the web series "She Said" for Amy Poehler's Smart Girls Network. The two wrote and starred together again in Take My Wife, on the comedy streaming service Seeso. Butcher also co-hosted the stand-up comedy podcast Put Your Hands Together with Cameron Esposito, which was recorded weekly in front of a live audience at the Upright Citizens Brigade Theater in Los Angeles until it ended in July 2019.

His first comedy album Butcher was released in August 2016 by the independent record label Kill Rock Stars. The set was performed at Mississippi Studios in Portland, Oregon. It debuted at number one on iTunes.

In 2016, he appeared in eight episodes of the first season of Adam Ruins Everything, returning in 2017 for one additional appearance. In 2018, he started hosting a baseball-focused podcast called Three Swings. In 2021, he appeared on Comedy Central Stand Up Presenting... A Different Kind of Dude. In 2023, he released his stand-up special, Someone's Boyfriend, on YouTube.

As stated in an interview, Butcher said his strongest comedy influences are Rosie O'Donnell, Ellen DeGeneres, Brett Butler, Elayne Boosler, Maria Bamford, and Paul F. Tompkins.

==== Voice acting ====
Butcher provided the voice for Asher, a fictional nonbinary character, for the animated series Kipo and the Age of Wonderbeasts, released in 2020.

== Personal life ==
Butcher met fellow comedian Cameron Esposito at an open mic hosted by Esposito. The two soon started collaborating and began to date. On December 12, 2015, Butcher and Esposito married onstage at The Hideout in Esposito's hometown of Chicago, Illinois. In August 2018, Butcher and Esposito announced their separation to "live individual lives". Their split was covered in a Vanity Fair article. In September 2019, Esposito wrote an article for the New York Times discussing the couple's pending divorce.

Butcher is a trans man and uses he and they pronouns. In November 2021, Butcher announced that he had changed his name to River.

Butcher endorsed Kenneth Mejia and Eunisses Hernandez during the 2022 Los Angeles elections.

== Notable appearances ==
Title	Medium	Role	Year
Put Your Hands Together	Podcast	Host	2013–2019
Wham Bam Pow	Podcast	Host	2013–2015
She Said	Web Video Series	Host	2015
Bajillion Dollar Propertie$	Television	Jamie	2016
Conan	Television	Guest	2016
Take My Wife	Television	Self	2016–2018
Adam Ruins Everything	Television	Self	2016
The Meltdown with Jonah and Kumail	Television	Guest	2016
HarmonQuest	Television	Guest	2016
Queery	Podcast	Guest	2018
Good Mythical Morning	YouTube	Guest	2018
Three Swings	Podcast	Host	2018–present
Good Trouble	Television	Lindsay Brady	2019–2021
Kipo and the Age of Wonderbeasts	Television	Voice of Asher	2020
Friendsgiving	Film	Denim	2020
