= Deva Pardue =

Irish graphic designer

Deva Pardue is an Irish graphic designer now based in New York City. A graduate of the School of Visual Arts, she has worked at Pentagram and The Wing, and is the founder of For All Womankind.

== Professional work ==
Pardue's education began in psychology before shifting to graphic design; she graduated with a Bachelor of Fine Arts from the School of Visual Arts in 2011 where she completed her final thesis under the guidance of Paula Scher. While working at the design firm Pentagram, she collaborated on the title sequence for NBC's show Unbreakable Kimmy Schmidt and worked on design for Bike New York and Minneapolis Institute of Art. She led development of the design team at The Wing, an all-women members club.

== For All Womankind ==
In Fall 2016, after the outcomes of the 2016 election, Pardue founded For All Womankind as a way to respond to contribute to post-election responses. The name "For All Womankind" refers, according to Pardue, to the need for intersectionality in organizing—across issues of gender and race, and beyond the level of campaigning for individual rights.

Her design work under this organization evolved from study of the raised fist motif and the realization that none of the existing iterations of this symbol looked feminine; in response, she created a motif of three raised fists, with different skin tones and painted red fingernails. She then created a series of posters using this motif, with different text, for use during public protests. Sale of posters, pins, and other materials with this design were directed to the Center for Reproductive Rights and Emily's List. A free download of posters was provided for the 2017 Women's March; downloads increased dramatically after Rihanna shared the image on her Instagram. The design was used without credit by ModCloth for sale of tshirts in Walmart stores.
