= Jessica Huseman =

American journalist focusing on voting and election reporting

Jessica Huseman is a journalist from Texas who is the editorial director of Votebeat, a nonprofit newsroom and Chalkbeat spin-off which devotes itself to election reporting. Votebeat was initially formed as a short-term project to cover the 2020 US elections but is now a permanent newsroom covering elections and voting in Texas, Arizona, Pennsylvania and Michigan. Huseman was hired in January 2021. Huseman's position involves shaping Votebeat's coverage area as well as fundraising.

== Early life and education ==
Huseman attended Southern Methodist University's Meadows School of the Arts, graduating in 2011 with degrees in journalism and political science. She was the editor-in-chief of the newspaper, The Daily Campus. When the school announced its plans to take control of student newspaper, moving it under the control of the journalism department, Huseman helped lead a campaign to try to let the paper maintain its independence.

She graduated with honors from the Columbia Graduate School of Journalism where she was a Stabile Fellow in Investigative Journalism. She received the Pulitzer Traveling Fellowship and the Fred M. Hechinger Award for Distinguished Education Reporting.

== Career ==
She was the lead reporter at ProPublica's Electionland project, which gave newsrooms access to election data in real time. Electionland monitored the 2016 presidential election with a team of over 1000 people gathering voting reports from around the United States, concluding that there was no evidence that the election was rigged or that there was widespread voter fraud. Huseman has been a frequent guest on CNN discussing election issues. Her writing has appeared in The Atlantic, Ms. Magazine and the Dallas Morning News.

Huseman frequently uses social media to let people know about breaking news and events. Her tweets about topics such as the shutting down of SMU's student newspaper and severe turbulence on an American Airlines flight in 2017 received wide republication. She was a high school history teacher in Newark, New Jersey and worked as an education reporter at The Teacher Project, reporting about America's teachers for Slate. While in graduate school in 2015, she was embedded in DeWitt Clinton High School in the Bronx and covered the use of data in the classroom.
