= ModCloth =

US women's clothing retailer

- Type: Subsidiary
- Industry: Retail, Apparel, e-commerce
- Founded: 2002 in Pittsburgh, Pennsylvania
- Founders: Eric Koger; Susan Gregg-Koger
- Headquarters: Los Angeles, California, United States
- Products: Clothing, accessories, decor
- Revenue: $150 million+ (2014)
- Owner: Nogin, Inc.
- Number of employees: 350+
- Parent: Nogin, Inc.
- Website: modcloth.com

ModCloth is an American online retailer of indie and vintage-inspired women's clothing based in Los Angeles.

== History ==
ModCloth was founded in 2002 by Susan Gregg Koger and Eric Koger while they were students at Carnegie Mellon University. They launched ModCloth as a website to sell used vintage dresses. ModCloth grossed $18,000 in revenue in 2005 and received its first round of seed funding in 2008. In 2009, ModCloth reported $15 million in revenue, allowing it to relocate its headquarters from Pittsburgh's Strip District to San Francisco. ModCloth reported $100 million in revenue in 2012 and $150 million in 2014.

In January 2015, ModCloth appointed Matthew A. Kaness as CEO, replacing Eric Koger. Kaness had previously served as chief strategy officer at Urban Outfitters, Inc. Under Kaness's leadership, ModCloth launched its first namesake label as part of its monthly collections in August 2015. The company expanded into brick-and-mortar retail when it opened its first pop-up Fit Shop in Los Angeles, followed by another in San Francisco. These shops stocked ModCloth clothing, accessories, and home décor, alongside items from local artists. They also served to introduce customers to the company's online features, such as Fit for Me and the Style Gallery.

ModCloth opened pop-up stores in other cities as part of the 2016 "ModCloth IRL Tour", including Washington, D.C., Portland, Austin, Denver, and Pittsburgh. Following these temporary store experiments, ModCloth opened its first permanent FitShop in Austin in November 2016. All physical locations have since closed.

In March 2017, ModCloth was acquired by Jet.com, a subsidiary of Walmart. Jet.com noted ModCloth would run independently, similar to the arrangement in place for other companies they had acquired in the past. Both the website and the retail store in Austin would be retained by ModCloth. The partnership would give ModCloth more working capital, the ability to open more physical stores, and the opportunity to grow the business to reach more consumers. Though the financial terms of the acquisition were not disclosed, the deal was estimated to be between $51 million and $75 million.

In October 2019, Walmart sold ModCloth to brand investment platform Go Global Retail, in a year when Walmart was facing projected losses of $1 billion in its e-commerce division.

In May 2021, Nogin acquired ModCloth from Go Global Retail for an undisclosed sum. In December 2023, Nogin filed for Chapter 11 bankruptcy. On April 3, 2024, Nogin announced the confirmation of a Chapter 11 restructuring plan under which its "reorganized equity interests will be acquired by a newly-formed entity sponsored by B. Riley Financial, Inc."

== Stance on body image ==
=== Truth in Advertising Act endorsement ===
In 2014, ModCloth became the first retailer to sign the Heroes Pledge for Advertisers. As an endorser, ModCloth committed to not using Photoshop to "change the shape, size, proportion, colour, and/or remove/enhance the physical features" of its advertising models in post-production. In June 2016, ModCloth hosted an event on Capitol Hill to support the Truth in Advertising Act. ModCloth's Susan Gregg Koger spoke at this event alongside Representative Ileana Ros-Lehtinen, who was one of the introducers of the act.

=== Real people as models ===
In 2015, ModCloth began using staff members as models for its swimwear advertising campaigns. ModCloth's swimsuit campaign launched in response to research that correlated low self-esteem for women with exposure to thin models.

=== Plus-size rebranding ===
In 2015, ModCloth removed the plus-size term from its site. The company's decision was supported by a ModCloth survey, which concluded that almost two-thirds of women were embarrassed to shop in a separate section for plus-labelled clothing. The plus-size clothing was integrated into the greater site and made shoppable through size filters.

== Crowdsourcing initiatives ==
ModCloth has developed several crowdsourcing initiatives that have impacted its product line.

=== Style Gallery ===
Style Gallery is a user-generated image gallery where customers submit photos of themselves wearing ModCloth garments. These photos are featured on the ModCloth blog, allowing visitors to see how items look on customers rather than professional models.

=== Fit for Me ===
Fit for Me is a feature on the ModCloth app that suggests clothing based on user reviews. Users input their body measurements when reviewing a purchased product, and the feature uses this data to generate clothing recommendations for users with similar measurements.

=== Be The Buyer ===
In 2009, the Be the Buyer program allowed users to vote on clothing samples via a virtual trade show to determine which designs would be produced and sold. If a sample received enough votes, it went into production and was sold on the website. Through this program, ModCloth became the first retailer to supplement an existing business model with crowdsourcing efforts.

=== Make the Cut ===
The 2012 Make the Cut contest allowed consumers to submit clothing sketches, which were then voted on by other users. Winning designs were produced for the spring line, and the finished garments featured the artist's name on the label.

== Deva Pardue design ==
ModCloth received negative press for using a design by artist Deva Pardue without permission or credit.

== Philanthropy ==
On March 5, 2012, ModCloth announced a donation of "just over 500" dresses to The Princess Project, a nonprofit organization that provides free prom dresses and accessories to high school students who cannot otherwise afford them. For every dress purchased from its Fancy Frocks collection that day, ModCloth pledged to donate a dress to the organization. ModCloth employees also volunteered at the dress giveaway days.

In 2015, ModCloth partnered with Schoola to raise money for the Malala Fund, an organization co-founded by Malala Yousafzai that advocates for girls' education. ModCloth donated clothing to Schoola, which sold the items at a discount and donated the proceeds to the Malala Fund.
