= Nikki & Sara Live =

- Genre: Late-night talk show
- Created by: Nikki Glaser; Sara Schaefer; Rob Anderson
- Presented by: Nikki Glaser; Sara Schaefer
- Country of origin: United States
- Original language: English
- No. of seasons: 2
- No. of episodes: 24

Production
- Executive producers: Brent Haynes; Kim Gamble; Nick Predescu; Nikki Glaser; Sara Schaefer; Shane Tilston
- Running time: 20 to 23 minutes

Original release
- Network: MTV
- Release: January 29 – October 29, 2013

Nikki & Sara Live is an American late night talk show hosted by comedians Nikki Glaser and Sara Schaefer. Glaser, Schaefer and Kim Gamble served as the show's executive producers. The series premiered on January 29, 2013, on the American cable television network MTV. Nikki & Sara Live was canceled on October 29, 2013.

== Production ==
Brian McCann served as the show's head writer for most of the first season. Kim Gamble has served as showrunner for both the first and second season. Glaser and Schaefer have hosted a weekly podcast, "You Had to Be There," since January 2011. While Glaser and Schaefer were partaking in an interview on Katie Couric's talk show, Katie, Couric surprised the duo with the news about the series' second season renewal, with the second and final season premiering July 30, 2013.

== Episodes ==
Season	Episodes	Originally released	
Season	Episodes	First released	Last released
1	12	January 29, 2013	April 16, 2013
2	12	July 30, 2013	October 29, 2013

=== Season 1 (2013) ===
No. overall	No. in season	Guest	Original release date
1	1	Kesha	January 29, 2013
2	2	Jenny McCarthy	February 5, 2013
3	3	Shay Mitchell	February 12, 2013
4	4	Alison Brie	February 19, 2013
5	5	Phillip Phillips	February 26, 2013
6	6	Jenni "JWoww" Farley	March 5, 2013
7	7	Jessica Alba	March 12, 2013
8	8	Jay Sean	March 19, 2013
9	9	Max Irons	March 26, 2013
10	10	Kal Penn	April 2, 2013
11	11	Ashley Tisdale	April 9, 2013
12	12	Olly Murs	April 16, 2013

=== Season 2 (2013) ===
No. overall	No. in season	Guest(s)	Original release date
13	1	Christopher Mintz-Plasse	July 30, 2013
14	2	Logan Lerman	August 6, 2013
15	3	Krewella	August 13, 2013
16	4	Amy Schumer and Ariana Grande	August 20, 2013
17	5	Iggy Azalea and One Direction	August 27, 2013
18	6	A$AP Rocky	September 3, 2013
-	-	Best of Nikki and Sara Live!	September 10, 2013
19	7	Austin Mahone	September 17, 2013
20	8	Jason Derulo and Cher Lloyd	September 24, 2013
21	9	Justin Timberlake and Grace Helbig	October 1, 2013
22	10	Daniel Radcliffe and the cast of Super Fun Night	October 8, 2013
23	11	Ashley Rickards and Justin Long	October 22, 2013
24	12	Johnny Knoxville, Jimmy Fallon, Regis Philbin, Arsenio Hall, Chris Hardwick, and Icona Pop	October 29, 2013

== Reception ==
The series has received positive reviews. Anna Brand of The Daily Beast cited hosts Nikki Glaser and Sara Schaefer's "refreshing lack of diva behavior," "harmless sarcasm," and real-life "closeness" as crucial elements to the success of the show, which she deemed "late-night TV's best-kept secret." Jezebel writer Erin Gloria Ryan called the show "pretty great, like having a slumber party with the girls you thought you were never cool enough to be friends in high school with but who turn out to be super nice."
