= Sharon Everitt =

American film and television director

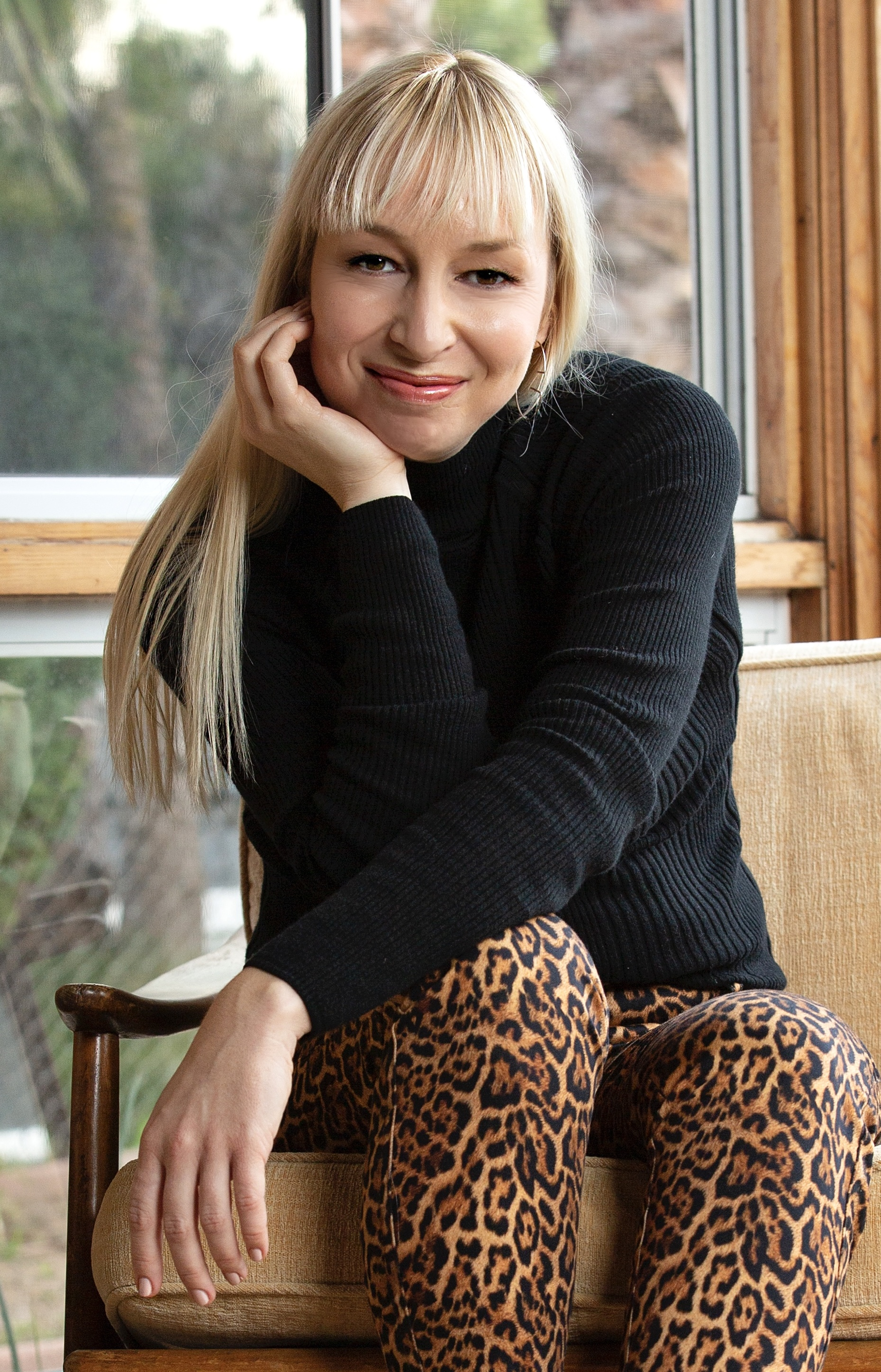
- Everitt in Los Angeles, 2020
- Born: Indianapolis, Indiana
- Education: Butler University
- Occupations: Film director, television director
- Years active: 2003-present
- Awards: Three Emmy nominations (2013, 2014)
- Website: www.sharoneveritt.com

Sharon Everitt is an American film and television director, producer, and editor.

== Career ==
Everitt's resume primarily consists of directing comedy, music, and performance. She is known for directing the CBS reboot of After Midnight, hosted by Taylor Tomlinson.

Everitt directed the first season of That's My Time with David Letterman for Netflix during the 2022 Netflix Is a Joke festival in Los Angeles.

Everitt directed the pilot episode of One Perfect Shot with executive producer Ava DuVernay for HBO Max in 2022.

In 2019, Everitt's science fiction film Polybius premiered at Fantastic Fest in Austin, Texas.

In 2018, Everitt directed the short film musical Brentwood starring Brent Spiner and Peri Gilpin which has played at the Mill Valley Film Festival. In 2019, the film was named "Best Short Film" by the Independent Film Showcase in Los Angeles.

She is known for directing the Comedy Central series The High Court starring Doug Benson, featuring guest stars Tiffany Haddish, Michael Ian Black, and Reggie Watts, among others.

Everitt is also known as the Executive Producer of the Disney Christmas specials on ABC from 2011 to 2013.

Everitt also has an extensive editorial history which primarily consists of editing comedy and music, including multiple official music videos for artist Taylor Swift.

In December 2018, NBC announced Everitt was announced as one of the members of the NBC Alternative Directors Program in its inaugural year. She worked on World of Dance and The Wall.

== Filmography ==
=== Television ===
Year	Title	Role	Notes
2003	MTV Movie Awards	Editor	Special
2004	56th Annual Primetime Emmy Awards	Editor	Special
2004	Tim McGraw: Here and Now	Editor	Special
2003-2005	American Idol	Editor	10 Episodes
2005	MTV VMAs	Editor	Special
2005-2006	So You Think You Can Dance	Editor	5 episodes
2009	Comedians of Chelsea Lately	Editor	Television movie, E!
2010	Janeane Garofalo: If You Will	Editor	Television movie, Epix
2010	The Benson Interruption	Editor	7 episodes, Comedy Central
2010	Taylor Swift: Journey to Fearless	Supervising Producer	Television Mini-series
2011	Disney Parks Christmas Day Parade	Producer	Television special, ABC
2011	Nick Kroll: Thank You Very Cool	Editor	Television movie, Comedy Central
2012	Celtic Woman: Believe	Editor	Special
2013	Disney Parks Christmas Day Parade	Executive Producer | Segment Director	Television special, ABC
2014	Doug Benson: Doug Dynasty	Segment Director	Television movie, Netflix
2014	Disney Parks Christmas Day Parade	Executive Producer | Segment Director	Television special, ABC
2015	The Game Awards	Producer	Special
2015	Elliott Morgan: Premature	Producer | Segment Director	Television movie
2017	The High Court	Director	25 episodes, Comedy Central
2017	My Partner Knows Best	Director	10 episodes, Lifetime
2018	A Legendary Christmas with John Legend	Segment Director	Special, NBC
2018	The Fix	Associate Director	10 episodes, Netflix
2019	World of Dance	Segment Director	4 episodes, NBC
2019	Elliott Morgan: Holy Sh*t	Director	Television Special, Amazon
2020	Disney Fam Jam	Director	2 episodes, Disney Channel
2019-2021	A Little Late with Lilly Singh	Director	58 episodes, NBC
2022	One Perfect Shot	Director	1 episode, HBO Max
2022	Jimmy Kimmel Live!	Director	17 episodes, ABC
2022	That's My Time with David Letterman	Director	6 episodes, Netflix
2022	Huluween Dragstravaganza	Executive Producer	Television Special, Hulu
2024	After Midnight	Director	175 episodes, CBS

=== Film ===
Year	Title	Role	Notes
2011	Taylor Swift: Speak Now World Tour	Editor	Special
2012	The Greatest Movie Ever Rolled	Executive Producer | Segment Director	Feature film, Netflix
2015	CHRONIC-CON Episode 420: A New Dope	Executive Producer | Segment Director	Feature film, Netflix
2016	Below the Root	Director	Short Film, Walt Disney Studios
2018	Brentwood	Director	Short Film
2019	Polybius	Director	Short Film

=== Music videos ===
Year	Title	Role	Notes
2011	Taylor Swift: Sparks Fly	Editor	Official Music Video
2016	Taylor Swift: New Romantics	Editor	Official Music Video

=== Advertising ===
Everitt has directed spots for brands including Disney Parks and the LA County Fair.

== Awards and nominations ==
Year	Nominee / work	Award	Result
2013	Disney Parks Christmas Day Parade	EMMY Outstanding Multiple Camera Editing	Nominated
2014	Disney Parks Christmas Day Parade	EMMY Outstanding Special Class Special	Nominated
2014	Disney Parks Christmas Day Parade	EMMY Outstanding Multiple Camera Editing	Nominated
