= Marcella Arguello =

American comedian

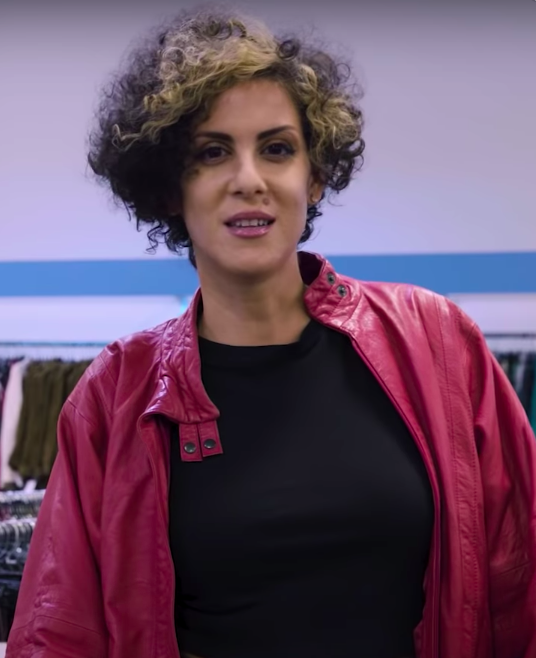
- Marcella Arguello in 2018
- Born: c. 1985 (age 40–41)

Comedy career
- Medium: Stand-up, sketch, television
- Genres: Race, gender, relationships, family, work, popular culture
- Website: MarcellaComedy.com

Marcella Arguello is a comedian based in Chicago, Illinois. She starred in the HBO Max comedy special Bitch, Grow Up!

== Early life ==
Arguello grew up in Modesto, California, where she was active in school theater. By her own description she was a class clown, known especially for her Michael Jackson impression. She attended Johansen High School, graduating in 2002. She attended California State University, Stanislaus and San Francisco State University for three years, intending to become an elementary school teacher, before moving to Los Angeles to pursue a career in comedy.

Her parents immigrated to the United States from El Salvador during the Salvadoran Civil War.

== Career ==
Arguello has worked at The Improv comedy clubs all over the U.S. and appears regularly at The Punch Line comedy clubs in Northern California. She has performed at The Ice House, The San Francisco Comedy Festival, Riot LA Comedy Festival, and for American troops overseas. Arguello has opened for Hannibal Buress, Ron Funches, David Alan Grier, Norm Macdonald, Jessimae Peluso, J. B. Smoove, and many others. In 2009, she won the Modesto Area Music Award (MAMA) for best comedian.

In 2015, Arguello made her national television debut, appearing on Last Call with Carson Daly. Since then she has appeared several times on the competitive improvisational comedy show @midnight, "winning the Internet" in March 2016 and again in Jan 2017. Arguello was featured on the Viceland comedy series Flophouse, in which Lance Bangs follows the lives of up-and-coming comedians at underground stand-up events, and in The Makings of a Stand-Up Comedian, a 2014 documentary film. She has also been featured on The Nerdist Podcast, Funny or Die, and The Don Geronimo Show. Her Twitter account, @marcellacomedy, was named one of the "75 Best Twitter Accounts of 2015" by Paste magazine, and has been featured on TIME.com, Brightest Young Things, Comedy Central, CNN, and many entertainment websites.

Arguello's subjects include race, gender, relationships, and family, among others. At six feet two inches tall, she also jokes about her height ("I love being a very tall woman until someone calls me 'sir' real loud in public"). She is also known for her "signature shock of curly hair". Arguello's influences include Dave Attell, Dave Chappelle, Natasha Leggero, and others.

Arguello takes on hecklers at her live shows. When asked what the appropriate retribution for hecklers is, she answered "verbal annihilation." She also does impersonations of Michael Jackson and Mariah Carey.

== Filmography ==
Year	Title	Role	Notes	Ref.
2014	The Makings of a Stand-Up Comedian	Self		
2015	Last Call with Carson Daly	Self	Episode: "Matthew Weiner/Marcella Arguello/Young Rising Sons"	
2015	LatiNation	Self	Episode: "5 October 2015"	
2015	@midnight	Self	9 episodes	
2016	RAGD	Mars	Short	
2016	Take My Wife	Waitress	2 episodes	
2016	Flophouse	Self	4 episodes	
2018	Corporate	Diana	Episode: "Remember Day"	
2018	Night Train with Wyatt Cenac	Self	Episode: "Halloween"	
2020	Best Presidency Ever	Performer		
2020	Sarah Cooper: Everything's Fine	Control Room Woman	TV Special	
2020	Or (Someone) Else	Maya	Short	
2020	Lights Out with David Spade	Self	Episode: "Episode 1.73"	
2022	Pause with Sam Jay	Party Guest	Episode: "Sexual Micalculations"	
2023	We Need To Talk About America	Performer	8 episodes	
2023	Marcella Arguello: Bitch, Grow Up!	Self	HBO special	
2023	After Midnight	Self	6 episodes	
2025	LMAOF	Performer	Episode: "LMAOF 76: Chicago"	
2025	Poker Face	Glinda	Episode: "The End of the Road"	
2025	Abbott Elementary	Ms. Alomar	3 episodes	

== Discography ==
=== Albums ===
- 2019: The Woke Bully – download, streaming
- 2022: Motivational Monday Meditations with Marcella Marguello - download, streaming
- 2023: Mercury in Reggaeton - download, streaming
