= After Midnight (TV series) =

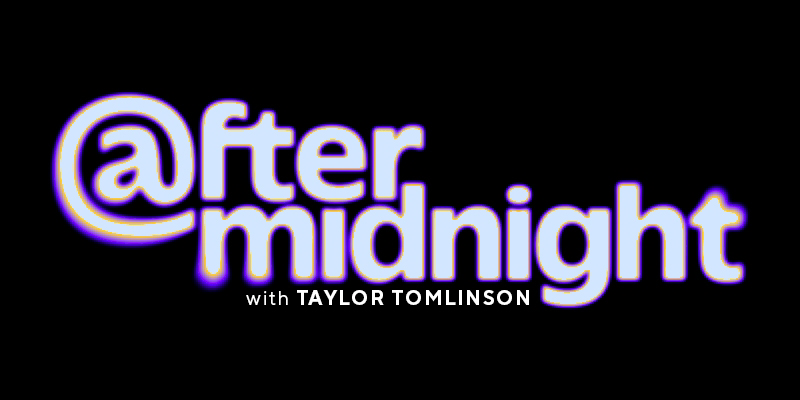
- Based on: @midnight by: Alex Blagg; Jason Nadler; Jon Zimelis
- Developed by: Jack Martin; Eric Pierce
- Written by: Jo Firestone
- Directed by: Sharon Everitt
- Presented by: Taylor Tomlinson
- Announcer: Laura Peek
- Composer: Cory Wong
- Country of origin: United States
- Original language: English
- No. of seasons: 2
- No. of episodes: 199

Production
- Executive producers: Stephen Colbert; Tom Purcell; Carrie Byalick; James Dixon; Evelyn Colbert; Joe Farrell; Mike Farah; Whitney Hodack; Henry R. Muñoz III; Jason U. Nadler; Taylor Tomlinson
- Production locations: Paramount Studios Stage 30; Los Angeles, California
- Production companies: Spartina Productions; Dixon Talent, Inc.; Funny or Die; CBS Studios

Original release
- Network: CBS
- Release: January 17, 2024 – June 13, 2025

Related
- @midnight

After Midnight, stylized as @fter midnight or abbreviated @m and alternatively known as After Midnight with Taylor Tomlinson, is an American late-night comedy panel game show hosted by Taylor Tomlinson and executive produced by Stephen Colbert via his company Spartina Productions, Henry R. Muñoz III via his comedy studio Funny or Die, and The Late Show with Stephen Colbert executive producer Tom Purcell. The program premiered on CBS at 12:37 am ET on January 17, 2024, in the time slot previously held by The Late Late Show with next day streaming on Paramount+. It is a reboot of @midnight, which ran from 2013 to 2017 on sister cable network Comedy Central. Upon its debut, it received generally positive reviews.

The show had originally been renewed for a third season but plans for it were canceled due to Tomlinson's decision to leave the program in order to focus on her stand-up career. The series finale aired on June 13, 2025.

== Production ==
The program is a revival of @midnight, which ran from October 21, 2013, to August 4, 2017, on Comedy Central and was hosted by Chris Hardwick. In February 2023, it was reported that Comedy Central's current sister broadcast network, CBS, was considering a revival of @midnight to serve as a replacement for The Late Late Show after the end of James Corden's tenure. Pre-production of the series was halted due to the 2023 Hollywood labor disputes.

On November 1, 2023, CBS announced the revival under the title After Midnight for a premiere in early 2024, with Jack Martin retained as showrunner alongside Eric Pierce. The creative team is also composed of comedian Jo Firestone as head writer, with Spartina Productions' Carrie Byalick and Evelyn Colbert, James Dixon, Tom Purcell, Funny or Die's Joe Farrell, Mike Farah, Whitney Hodack, Henry R. Muñoz III, and @midnight co-creator Jason U. Nadler serving as executive producers.

On that night's episode of The Late Show, Colbert subsequently revealed stand-up comedian Taylor Tomlinson as the show's new host. She was chosen after auditioning alongside comedians Ricky Velez and X Mayo.

The show aired Mondays through Thursdays; a special football-themed episode aired on Super Bowl Sunday after CBS's coverage of Super Bowl LVIII, complete with a "halftime show" musical performance by Marc Rebillet.

On June 11, 2024, CBS Entertainment President Amy Reisenbach announced that the network had renewed After Midnight for a second season through 2025. Season 2 premiered on September 3, 2024, and introduced a new title sequence and added announcer Laura Peek (who also appeared as a contestant in September 2024) as well as a set including a new couch, chair, coffee table, end table, and rug for The Talk Show Portion (which soon morphed into "The Couch Game"), that now took up the entire second or third act. Also new in season 2 was a final closing segment after the winner is picked in the previous act.

On January 8, 2025, it was announced that After Midnight would suspend production due to the wildfires in the Southern California region and the city of Los Angeles, where Paramount Studios (the filming spot for the show) was located. The show resumed broadcasting on January 22.

=== Cancellation ===
On March 26, 2025, CBS announced that After Midnight would end after two seasons, after Tomlinson announced her intent to resign as host to return to her stand-up career. CBS had initially renewed the series for a third season before Tomlinson's resignation. CBS opted not to air another original program in the time slot, with reports indicating it would most likely be given back to affiliates after the series finale airs in June. In May, CBS partially reversed course, announcing that episodes of the syndicated series Comics Unleashed would fill the time slot beginning that September on a time buy arrangement with Allen's company. The show had previously filled the time slot between the end of The Late Late Show and the premiere of After Midnight.

== Format ==
As with the original series, each episode features a panel of three celebrity guests as contestants, usually stand-up comedians or comedy podcast hosts and sometimes comedic actors. The contestants participate in topical segments related to popular culture and social media to earn points from the host for responses and punch lines. In addition to new games, the series retains some of the core segments from @midnight, including the opening segment, formerly titled "Group Chat" ("Rapid Refresh" on @midnight), a segment discussing recent news headlines and viral videos; "Hashtag Wars", in which the contestants come up with answers for a fictional hashtag as a parody of a currently trending topic (now done as an elimination game); and "For the Win" (rebranded "The Ultimate Challenge" in season 2), a final challenge played between the top two scorers.

Celebrities who competed include Ilana Glazer, Jessica Williams, Patton Oswalt, Pete Holmes, Bob the Drag Queen, Anna Faris, Melanie Lynskey, Sherry Cola, and Robby Hoffman.

A new recurring segment, "The Talk Show Portion", was later added, as a satire and commentary upon viewers who thought that After Midnight would be a traditional late-night talk show. Beginning May 20, 2024, the show opened with Tomlinson delivering a monologue similar to those of other network late night shows. Occasionally, a fourth guest appears, but does not compete, including: Survivor host Jeff Probst, social media influencer Drew Afualo, reality-star Boston Rob, actresses Tatyana Ali, June Squibb, and Rebecca Romijn (notably joining an episode in which her husband Jerry O'Connell participated), Olympic gymnast Fred Richard, and Tracker star Justin Hartley.

=== Prizes and punishments ===
Unlike @midnight, where contestants played to "win the Internet", the winner typically receives a gag prize, which may be tangible or imaginary (early episodes featured old ketchup packets from Tomlinson's refrigerator, a damaged office chair, Tomlinson's father's approval, and an extra year of life). Some later prizes were more valuable, such as a pair of boxer shorts signed by Tom Brady, $65 in cash, and a pair of night vision goggles; other episodes have awarded desirable food items such as a cooked rotisserie chicken or a basket of doughnuts and beer. On the final episode, Marcella Arguello was declared the "winner" of After Midnight, after defeating Paul F. Tompkins in a Beyblade battle in the Ultimate Challenge during the finals to determine the show's "ultimate champion".

In most episodes, the player in last place is subjected to a humorous punishment such as being forced to give an apology speech or being sent to "horny jail". As a prank on April Fools' Day 2024, the highest scoring contestant was actually eliminated.

==== The haunted dolls ====
One prize, an allegedly haunted doll, was originally a gift to Tomlinson from her brother; Tomlinson says the doll is supposed to be Frank Morgan's version of the title character from The Wizard of Oz but looks more like author Mark Twain. The doll has become a running gag, appearing multiple times due to winners returning it. While the original doll was given to Marcella Arguello as a consolation prize, a fan later sent in an identical doll, claiming it was the first one's twin brother. Arguello brought the doll with her on a subsequent appearance, where fellow contestant Sarah Tiana said it looked more like former president John Adams. In the final episode, Arguello re-gifted the doll to Tomlinson, who subsequently gave it to finalist Paul F. Tompkins.

== International version ==
A German version of the show, Neo Social Club mit Laura Larsson (Neo Social Club with Laura Larsson) hosted by Laura Larsson premiered on ZDFneo on February 5, 2026.
