= Problematic with Moshe Kasher =

American late-night talk show

- Genre: Talk show
- Created by: Moshe Kasher; Alex Blagg
- Presented by: Moshe Kasher
- Country of origin: United States
- Original language: English
- No. of seasons: 1
- No. of episodes: 7

Production
- Executive producers: Moshe Kasher; Alex Blagg; Jason Nadler; Jon Zimelis; Dave Becky; Josh Lieberman; Nick Mullen
- Running time: 22 minutes
- Production company: 3 Arts Entertainment

Original release
- Network: Comedy Central
- Release: April 18 – June 6, 2017

Problematic with Moshe Kasher is an American late-night talk show hosted by Moshe Kasher. The series premiered on April 18, 2017, on Comedy Central. It was cancelled on June 6, 2017.

== Episodes ==
No.	Title	Original release date	US viewers (millions)
1	"Cultural Appropriation"	April 18, 2017	0.238
2	"Technology: Is the Internet Ruining Your Brain?"	April 25, 2017	0.250
3	"Islamophobia: Being Muslim in America"	May 2, 2017	0.193
4	"The Dark Web: Good or Evil?"	May 9, 2017	0.262
5	"The Liberal Case for Guns"	May 16, 2017	0.254
6	"Meet the Alt-Right"	May 23, 2017	0.232
7	"Psychedelics: Medicine or Madness?"	June 6, 2017	N/A
