= Betas =

2013 TV series

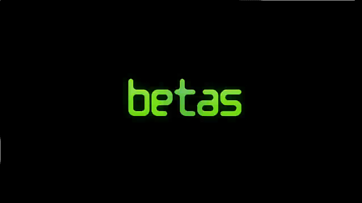
- Genre: Comedy
- Written by: Alan Cohen; Alan Freedland; Evan Endicott; Josh Stoddard; Alex Blagg; Matt Patterson; Alison Bennett; Lisa Parsons; Ken Cheng; Aaron Hilliard; Michael Platt; Barry Safchik
- Directed by: Michael Lehmann
- Starring: Joe Dinicol; Karan Soni; Jon Daly; Charlie Saxton
- Opening theme: "Power Lines" by Telekinesis
- Country of origin: United States
- Original language: English
- No. of seasons: 1
- No. of episodes: 11

Production
- Running time: 26 minutes
- Production companies: Picrow; Groundswell Productions; Alan & Alan Productions; Amazon Studios

Original release
- Network: Amazon Prime Video
- Release: April 19, 2013 – January 17, 2014

Betas is an American television sitcom produced by Amazon Studios. The show stars Joe Dinicol and Karan Soni as "dating app" developers in Silicon Valley who are looking for an investor.

Amazon offered the first three episodes of Betas for free on November 22, 2013, with each subsequent episode released weekly thereafter. In March 2014, Amazon decided not to renew for a second season.

== Cast ==
=== Series regulars ===
- Joe Dinicol as Trey
- Karan Soni as Nash
- Jon Daly as Hobbes
- Charlie Saxton as Mitchell
- Maya Erskine as Mikki
- Daivik Dave as Daivik

=== Recurring characters ===
- Ed Begley, Jr. as Murch
- Madeline Zima as Jordan Alexis
- Tyson Ritter as Dane
- Breeda Wool as Victoria
- Mark L. Young as Trevor
- Margo Harshman as Lisa
- Diana Burbano as Hispanic Mother
- Paul Walter Hauser as Dashawn

== Episodes ==
| No. | Title | Directed by | Written by | Original release date |
|---|---|---|---|---|
| 1 | "Pilot" | Michael Lehmann | Evan Endicott & Josh Stoddard | April 19, 2013 |
In Silicon Valley, the right algorithm can make you a success and these four friends think they have some successful code.
| 2 | "Kid Charlemagne" | Michael Lehmann | Evan Endicott & Josh Stoddard | November 22, 2013 |
With their invitation to join the reputable Accelerator run by George "Murch" Murchison, the boys settle into the city with big dreams. That swagger is soon quelled by the reality of their competition within Velocity; they need momentum and they need it fast. Trey spots an opportunity in tech journalist Jordan Alexis, ignoring both Hobbes' warning of her anti-Midas touch and Lisa's mandate to lay low. Blinded by his own ambition, Trey gives Jordan just the dirty secret she's after, and then must enlist the help of Mikki and the guys to spin the story she weaves into a successful launch of the BRB beta.
| 3 | "Waiting for a Girl Like You" | Michael Lehmann | Alan R. Cohen & Alan Freedland | November 22, 2013 |
Nash's parents visit the guys and demand that Nash go on a blind date with a girl they picked for him. With an investment from Nash's parents at stake, Trey and Lisa must accompany Nash on his date.
| 4 | "One on One" | Todd Strauss-Schulson | Alex Blagg | November 29, 2013 |
In the aftermath of Trey and Lisa's hookup, Trey tries to get some clarity on their relationship while Lisa tries to stand up to The Murch. Meanwhile, Mitchell worries that Murch is going to buy, and ruin, his beloved indie wrestling league.
| 5 | "Takin' It to the Streets" | Michael Lehmann | Matt Patterson, Evan Endicott & Josh Stoddard | December 6, 2013 |
When BRB is hacked right after the beta launch, Trey and Hobbes get to know each other better as they desperately search the city for their prime suspect, a hacktivist from Hobbes's past. Meanwhile, Mikki takes care of an anxious Mitchell after he runs out of Adderall.
| 6 | "Lowdown" | Andy Tennant | Alison Bennett, Evan Endicott & Josh Stoddard | December 13, 2013 |
With Demo Day fast approaching, Trey discovers that BRB does not have enough female users to fulfill his vision of a truly social app. Despite pressure from Nash to focus on BRB's strengths, Trey is unwilling to alter his vision. Meanwhile, Hobbes spirals out of control due to a personal crisis, and the team needs to figure out how best to deal with his increasingly volatile behavior.
| 7 | "Strange Magic" | Jeff Melman | Evan Endicott & Josh Stoddard | December 20, 2013 |
With the team in disarray before Demo Day, Murch sends Trey and the boys to a team-building retreat in the woods. Once there, they quickly reject the retreat's itinerary and go rogue. In the end, their trip yields insights into the future of BRB and brings them closer together, in ways they never expected.
| 8 | "Show & Tell" | Alex Winter | Evan Endicott & Josh Stoddard | December 27, 2013 |
When BRB receives a lukewarm response from investors at Demo Day, Trey and Nash must choose between conflicting courses of action in order to secure the future of their company. Meanwhile, both Nash and Mitchell are forced to evaluate their personal lives and face some inner truths.
| 9 | "Steppin' Out" | Lev L. Spiro | Evan Endicott & Josh Stoddard | January 3, 2014 |
When a scandal puts the Murch on ice, BRB's potential investors begin to pull out. Desperate, Trey must turn to an unlikely source for help, even if it means straining his relationship with Murch. Meanwhile, Mikki's wayward mother drops in unexpectedly, hoping to pick up right where they left off.
| 10 | "Blinded by the Light" | Michael Lehmann | Michael Platt, Evan Endicott & Josh Stoddard | January 10, 2014 |
Having turned his back on Murch, Trey arrives in L.A. to run the Silicon Beach investor circuit with Victoria. Back in San Francisco, Mitchell accompanies Nash to Michael Lau's birthday bash, and Hobbes gets closer with Trevor's mom, Joanne.
| 11 | "This Is It" | Michael Lehmann | Evan Endicott & Josh Stoddard | January 17, 2014 |
Armed with insider information from Jordan, Trey must decide whether or not to sell BRB. He mends fences with Murch and seeks his advice after the rest of the team votes to take Casper's deal.

== Reception ==
Metacritic gave season 1 an average rating of 69/100 based on reviews from 8 critics. Rotten Tomatoes gave the show a score of 85% based on reviews from 13 critics.
