= Disney Fam Jam =

American dance competition TV series

- Genre: Dance competition
- Directed by: Carrie Havel; Sharon Everitt
- Presented by: Phil Wright; Ariel Martin; Trevor Tordjman
- Country of origin: United States
- Original language: English
- No. of seasons: 1
- No. of episodes: 19

Production
- Executive producers: Jay Peterson; Todd Lubin; James Sunderland; Phil Wright; Irene Dreayer
- Cinematography: Martin Runel
- Camera setup: Multi-camera
- Running time: 24–25 minutes
- Production company: Matador Content

Original release
- Network: Disney Channel
- Release: February 23 – December 4, 2020

Disney Fam Jam is an American dance competition television series that aired on Disney Channel from February 23 to December 4, 2020. The series is hosted by Phil Wright, Ariel Martin, and Trevor Tordjman.

== Premise ==
Two families dance against each other. Phil Wright helps the families with the choreography while Ariel Martin and Trevor Tordjman host the main event. After their performances, the audience votes for their favorite families. The family with the most votes receives a grand prize of $10,000 and the Fam Jam trophy, while the runner-up family receives $2,500.

== Production ==
On October 11, 2019, it was announced that Disney Channel had given a straight-to-series order to Disney Fam Jam, inspired by Phil Wright's online The Parent Jam dance classes. Production on the multi-camera series began in November 2019. Matador Content serves as production company. Jay Peterson, Todd Lubin, Irene Dreayer, and Phil Wright serve as executive producers. James Sunderland serves as showrunner. On January 17, 2020, it was announced that the series would premiere on February 23, 2020. Ariel Martin, Trevor Tordjman, and Phil Wright serve as hosts for the series.

== Episodes ==
No.	Title	Original release date	Prod. code	U.S. viewers (millions)
1	"Lee & Jacobs"	February 23, 2020	106	0.43
Songs featured: "I Really Like You" by Carly Rae Jepsen, "I Gotta Feeling" by Black Eyed Peas, "Survivor" by Destiny's Child
2	"Gregorio & Dixon"	March 1, 2020	102	0.30
Songs featured: "Hey Ya!" by Outkast, "Jopping" by SuperM, "Level Up" by Ciara
3	"Green & Love"	March 8, 2020	107	0.26
Songs featured: "Panini" by Lil Nas X, "California Gurls" by Katy Perry, "Born This Way" by Lady Gaga
4	"Dorsey & Jones"	March 15, 2020	112	0.36
Songs featured: "There's Nothing Holdin' Me Back" by Shawn Mendes, "I Like to Move It" by Reel 2 Real, "Boogie Woogie Bugle Boy" by Bette Midler
5	"Dixon & Santoro"	March 22, 2020	111	0.39
Songs featured: "I Don't Care" by Ed Sheeran & Justin Bieber, "Honey, I'm Good" by Andy Grammer, "Hey Look Ma, I Made It" by Panic! at the Disco
6	"Rodriguez & Batista"	March 29, 2020	110	0.44
Songs featured: "What About Your Friends" by TLC, "Finesse" by Bruno Mars, "A Little Party Never Killed Nobody (All We Got)" by Fergie
7	"Amaya & Calder"	April 5, 2020	104	0.27
Songs featured: "Applause" by Lady Gaga, "Confident" by Demi Lovato, "Monster Mash" by Bobby (Boris) Pickett & The Crypt-Kickers
8	"Silver & Rassi"	June 21, 2020	117	0.25
Songs featured: "Gangnam Style" by Psy, "Havana" by Camila Cabello, "Boom Boom Pow" by Black Eyed Peas
9	"Puletasi & Green"	June 28, 2020	105	0.28
Songs featured: "Party in the U.S.A." by Miley Cyrus, "We Like to Party!" by Vengaboys, "Firework" by Katy Perry
10	"Bailey & Diaz-Estorga"	July 12, 2020	116	0.32
Songs featured: "Don't Start Now" by Dua Lipa, "Me Too" by Meghan Trainor, "It Takes Two" by Rob Base & DJ E-Z Rock
11	"Butson-Luthier & Lineberry"	July 19, 2020	120	0.22
Songs featured: "What Doesn't Kill You (Stronger)" by Kelly Clarkson, "Good Feeling" by Flo Rida, "Jai Ho! (You Are My Destiny)" by A.R. Rahman & The Pussycat Dolls
12	"Trick or Treat Yo Self"	October 9, 2020	109	0.30
Songs featured: "Bad Guy" by Billie Eilish, "Addams Groove" by MC Hammer, "Mi Gente" J Balvin & Willy William
13	"Helton & Koonce"	October 16, 2020	115	0.24
Songs featured: "Sucker" by Jonas Brothers, "This Is How We Do It" by Montell Jordan, "Ice Ice Baby" by Vanilla Ice
14	"Foster & Hernandez"	October 23, 2020	114	0.26
Songs featured: "Pop N Lock" by DJ Big Boy, "September" by Earth, Wind & Fire, "Happy" by Pharrell Williams
15	"Reynoso & Dawson"	November 23, 2020	113	0.15
Songs featured: "Moves Like Jagger" by Maroon 5, "Party Rock Anthem" by LMFAO, "Can't Hold Us" by Macklemore & Ryan Lewis
16	"Velazquez & Francis"	November 23, 2020	119	0.13
Songs featured: "Truth Hurts" by Lizzo, "Wake Me Up" by Avicii, "Time of Our Lives" by Pitbull & Ne-Yo
17	"Barnes & Schroeder"	November 23, 2020	118	0.15
Songs featured: "Who Let the Dogs Out?" by Baha Men, "Rapper's Delight" by The Sugarhill Gang, "Call Me Maybe" by Carly Rae Jepsen
18	"Anderson & Washington"	November 23, 2020	103	N/A
Songs featured: "Rockin' Robin" by Jackson 5, "The Git Up" by Blanco Brown, "U Can't Touch This" by MC Hammer
19	"Jolly Holidance"	December 4, 2020	108	0.31
Songs featured: "Underneath the Tree" by Kelly Clarkson, "What Christmas Means to Me" by Stevie Wonder, "Jingle Bells" by Gwen Stefani

== Ratings ==
Viewership and ratings per season of Disney Fam Jam
Season	Episodes	First aired		Last aired		Avg. viewers (millions)
Season	Episodes	Date	Viewers (millions)	Date	Viewers (millions)	Avg. viewers (millions)
1	18	February 23, 2020	0.43	December 4, 2020	0.31	0.28
