= The High Court with Doug Benson =

- Genre: Arbitration-based reality court comedy show
- Directed by: Sharon Everitt
- Judges: Doug Benson
- Narrated by: Dude Walker
- Country of origin: United States
- Original language: English
- No. of seasons: 1
- No. of episodes: 20

Production
- Production locations: Los Angeles, California
- Running time: 11 minutes
- Production companies: JASH and Propagate Content

Original release
- Network: Comedy Central
- Release: February 28 – March 24, 2017

The High Court with Doug Benson is an American arbitration-based reality court comedy show presided over by comedian Doug Benson. The High Court with Doug Benson premiered on Comedy Central on February 28, 2017. In each episode Benson judged real cases while under the influence of cannabis. This court show also marked the return of Viacom to the court show genre.

== Development ==
While pitching the show to Comedy Central, Doug Benson said that the show would be a "court room show and I'm the judge". Comedy Central accepted it right away, thinking that Benson's antics would be liked by their audience. Benson said the pitch was the easiest pitch he had ever made in his career.

== Production ==
Benson was under the influence of cannabis during each trial. Each episode had a special "guest bailiff", who helped make the final decision on the case during the deliberation, often after smoking from a bong on-air along with Benson. All of the cases featured were real and Benson's rulings were real and legally binding. The cases in the show were pulled from the Los Angeles County court records, which is a common practice used in other court shows. The show's budget had money allotted for Benson to pay the people pleading their cases if necessary.

The show was recorded in Los Angeles, California, where recreational use of cannabis has been legal since 2016. A special ventilation system was added to the deliberation room studio to filter smoke out of the room, so production crew and producers would not be impaired during filming.

The series was directed by Sharon Everitt, and produced by JASH and Propagate Content.

== Episodes ==
No.	Title	Guest bailiff(s)	Original release date	US viewers (millions)
1	"Someone Is Paying for This Tow Job"	Tiffany Haddish	February 28, 2017	0.254
A woman sues for $600, after she lent the defendant her car and never returned it. The defendant counter-sues for $2,100, because the car had expired tags and was impounded. Verdict: Doug orders the plaintiff to pay the defendant $1,100.
2	"Driving Miss Johnson"	Geoff Tate	March 1, 2017	0.197
A mother claims her daughter borrowed $3,858 for a new car, and never repaid her. The defendant claims she doesn't owe anything because she drives her mother everywhere. Verdict: Doug decided to have the court pay off the initial loan, and give the defendant a lesser loan to pay.
3	"Snakes in the Drain"	Michael Ian Black	March 2, 2017	0.192
A man sues his uncle for $500 for letting his pet snake escape while pet sitting. The defendant claims the snake got away on its own. Verdict: Doug orders the defendant to pay the full $500.
4	"Last Comic Stealing"	Jessimae Peluso	March 3, 2017	0.329
A comedian sues another comedian for $1,000, for using one of his jokes. The defendant claims he changed the joke enough to make it different. Verdict: Doug pays the Plaintiff $35.
5	"Channeling Her Anger"	Slink Johnson	March 3, 2017	0.302
A man sues his ex-friend $1,000 for breaking his television. The defendant claims that the plaintiff angered her intentionally. Verdict: Doug orders the defendant to pay the plaintiff $400.
6	"I Ain't Saying She's a Gold Digger"	Reggie Watts	March 7, 2017	0.198
A man sues his ex-girlfriend for $2,400, claiming he lent her money to record an album and was never repaid. The defendant claims the money was an investment in her career, and not a loan. Verdict: The plaintiff is awarded $1,200.
7	"He Took My Money Fast and Now I'm Furious"	Rory Scovel	March 8, 2017	0.256
A woman sues a car dealer for $1,410, for cars she claims he never delivered. The defendant claims said he did find the cars but none of them suited her. Verdict: Doug orders the defendant to pay $705.
8	"Hair Today, Gone Tomorrow"	Brandon Wardell	March 9, 2017	0.265
A woman sues her friend for $2,500, after ordering hair extensions that never arrived. The defendant claims they were delivered but eaten by the plaintiff's dog. Verdict: Doug orders the defendant to pay the full $2,500.
9	"Taken for a Ride"	Tiffany Haddish	March 10, 2017	0.200
A woman sues her mother for $5,000 in back rent. The defendant claims she shouldn't have to repay her daughter. Verdict: Doug rules in favor of the defendant.
10	"Bringing Sexy Back to the Blues"	Todd Glass	March 10, 2017	0.196
A blues musician sues his goddaughter for the $500 he didn't receive for a night club appearance. The defendant claims she shouldn't have to pay because nobody attended the show. Verdict: Doug rules in favor of the defendant.
11	"Dog Gone It"	Kenny Lucas & Keith Lucas	March 14, 2017	0.354
A woman sues for $5,000 after her pet sitter refused to return her chihuahua. The defendant claims the chihuahua was abandoned and now belongs to him. Verdict: Doug orders the defendant to return the dog to the plaintiff, and orders the plaintiff to pay the defendant $500.
12	"The Great Screwdini"	Michael Ian Black	March 15, 2017	0.185
A magician sues another magician for $5,000, claiming he stole one of his tricks. The defendant claims that the trick is an old trick, and he shouldn't have to pay. Verdict: Doug orders the defendant to pay the plaintiff $1,050.
13	"Radio Hits"	Joey Diaz	March 16, 2017	0.211
A woman sues her ex-girlfriend for $800 for breaking her car radio. The defendant claims she doesn't owe anything because she was provoked. Verdict: Doug orders the plaintiff to pay $807.97.
14	"Two's Company, Three's a Crowd"	Tiffany Haddish	March 17, 2017	0.211
A man sues for $1,250 for a security deposit for the apartment she rented. The defendant claims she shouldn't have to pay because the plaintiff skipped out on the lease. Verdict: Doug orders the defendant to pay the full $1,250.
15	"Model Misbehavior"	Rory Scovel	March 17, 2017	0.189
A woman sues her son for the $300 she wasn't repaid for cosmetics. The defendant claims he doesn't have to pay because the products caused him to break out, costing him a modeling gig. Verdict: Doug orders the defendant to pay the full $300.
16	"Dude, Where's My Truck?"	Joey Diaz	March 21, 2017	0.249
A man sues his friend for $1,800, claiming that he lost his truck. The defend claims the truck was stolen by the plaintiff's other friends. Verdict: Doug orders the defendant to pay $250.
17	"Good Faith, Hope and Charity"	Beth Stelling	March 22, 2017	0.253
A woman sues a car dealer for the $2,000 deposit she lost on a truck she never received. The defendant claims he owes her nothing because his deposits are non-refundable. Verdict: Doug orders the defendant to pay the full $2,000.
18	"Joint Apartment"	Todd Glass	March 23, 2017	0.226
A man sues his ex-roommate for $5,000 in back rent. The defendant claims he doesn't owe any money because the apartment was "unlivable". Verdict: Doug orders the defendant to pay the full $5,000.
19	"Smoked-out Couch"	Kenny Lucas & Keith Lucas	March 24, 2017	0.254
A man sues for $1,600, claiming the defendant burned his couch with a joint. The defendant denies the accusation. Verdict: Doug orders the defendant to pay $800.
20	"Driving Buds Bad Behavior"	Slink Johnson	March 24, 2017	0.175
A man sues his friend for $900, after lending him the money without being repaid. The defendant claims he shouldn't have to pay because he was drunk at the time. Verdict: Doug orders the defendant to pay the full $900.

== Home media ==
The High Court with Doug Benson is available in high-definition and standard-definition video for digital purchase on Google Play, Amazon Video, and Microsoft.
