= Fountain Street Church =

Church building in Michigan, United States of America

Coordinates: 42°57′54.3″N 85°40′0.9″W

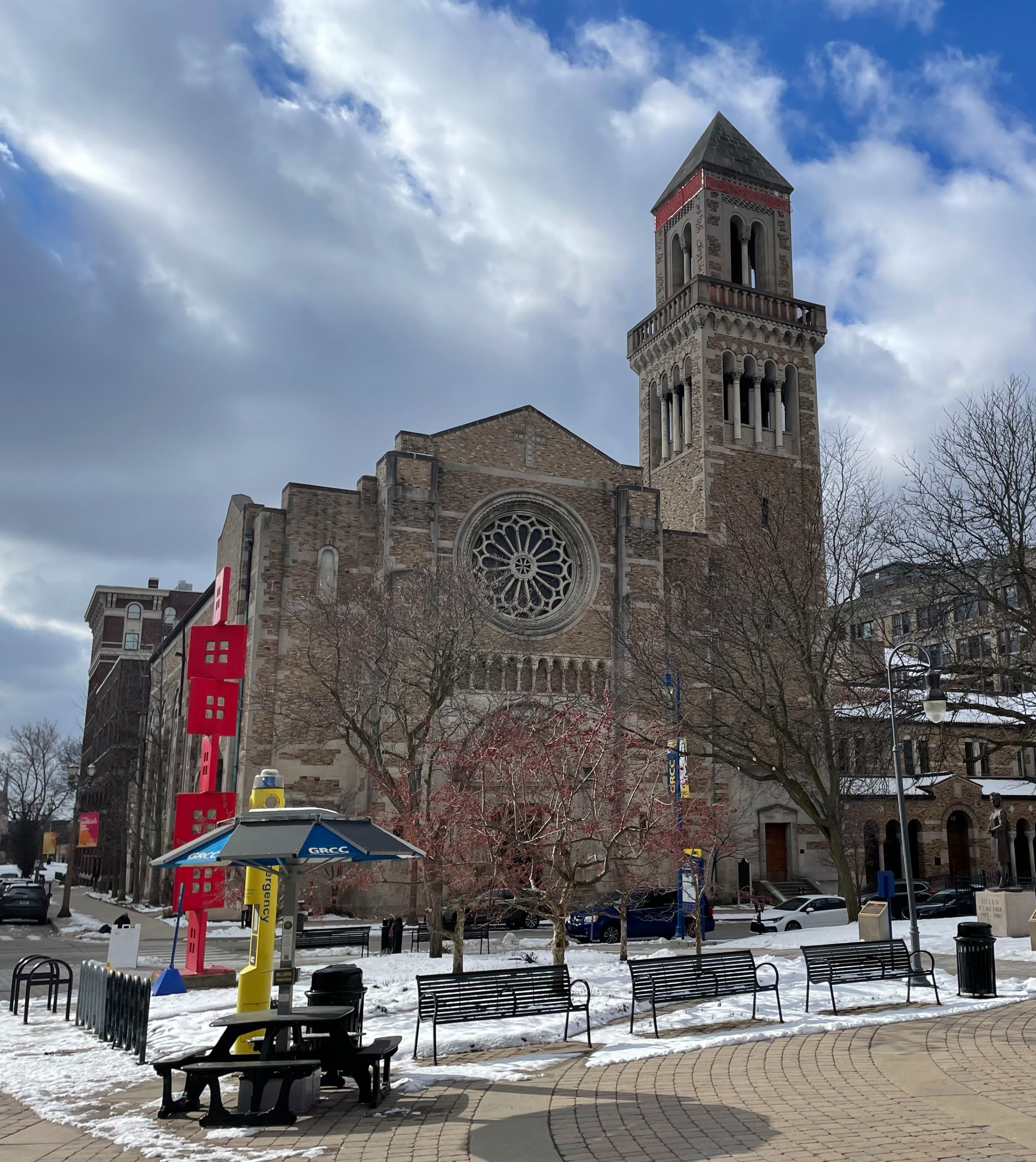
- Interactive map of the Fountain Street Church area
- Former names: Fountain Street Baptist Church

General information
- Architectural style: Romanesque
- Location: 24 Fountain St NE; Grand Rapids, Michigan
- Construction started: 1920
- Completed: 1924

Height
- Height: 158 feet (48 m)

Fountain Street Church (FSC) is an independent, non-denominational church in Grand Rapids, Michigan. The church started out as a Baptist congregation, but it changed its views when liberal Christianity became popular in the late 1800s. Most of the people who influenced this change were graduates of the University of Chicago Divinity School, a pioneer of liberal Christianity.

Established in the largest town in West Michigan in 1869 as Fountain Street Baptist Church, by 1960 FSC ended its Baptist identity to become an independent, non-denominational, and liberal church. In 1959, a book chronicling the story of Fountain Street Church titled Liberal Legacy – A History of Fountain Street Church was published in-house by Philip Buchen, a member of the church and legal advisor to President Gerald Ford.

== History ==
The roots of Fountain Street Church date to 1824 when the region's original Baptist mission established itself to convert the Ottawa Native Americans. A lengthy history of institutional squabbles between themselves and other area Baptists eventually culminated in the two factions' reunion in 1869 to create Fountain Street Baptist Church (so named for the building they erected on the east side of downtown Grand Rapids).

Following the ministry of John L. Jackson, the church selected John Herman Randall, a young graduate of the new University of Chicago Divinity School. Over his ten-year ministry, Randall effectively converted Fountain Street Baptist Church from "traditional" to "progressive," reflecting the spirit of the Divinity School that is still known for its liberal approach to religious studies. He left to serve Mount Morris Baptist Church in New York, New York, and eventually moved on to serve John Haynes Holmes' Community Church of New York, beginning a kinship with Unitarians that continues to this day. Randall's son, John Herman Randall, Jr., became a noted philosopher at Columbia University.

While Randall's career moved the church toward a more liberal direction, his successor, Alfred Wesley Wishart—also a graduate of the Divinity School—permanently set FSC on a liberal path. Wishart's career was marked by three significant events: 1) The 1911 furniture workers' strike; 2) the rebuilding of the church following destruction by fire in 1917; and 3) the use of FSC as a public venue for international debates and lectures.

=== The 1911 Furniture Workers Strike ===
Coming early in Wishart's career at FSC, the furniture workers' strike began as an effort to organize the furniture-making factories then critical to Grand Rapids. When the union's demands for a nine-hour day, pay by the hour, and a ten percent raise of the average wage were denied, Wishart and others intervened to try to prevent a strike with a commission whose report supported management. The workers went on strike for seventeen weeks, but ultimately failed in their efforts.

While supportive of labor in principle, Wishart did not approve of union tactics. His "social secretary" (i.e., social worker), Viva Flaherty, was publicly supportive of the workers, making the strike a critical issue that divided sympathies in the church and wider community. Flaherty had begun her career at FSC working with John Randall and chided Wishart for lacking the zeal she found in his predecessor.

=== The Church burns ===
In May 1917, the American neo-Gothic building that housed Fountain Street Church burned to the ground. No cause was ever determined. The massive neo-Romanesque structure that now stands in its place was completed in 1924 following seven years of work and planning on behalf of Wishart and the church (during which time worshipping took place at Powers Theater). Designed to serve as a public auditorium as well as a house of worship, the new building had a seating capacity of over 1,500. The large bell tower became part of the city's official World War I memorial; some of the tower's room was dedicated to those slain in the war. The new building was constructed at a height of 158 feet.

=== Great debates ===
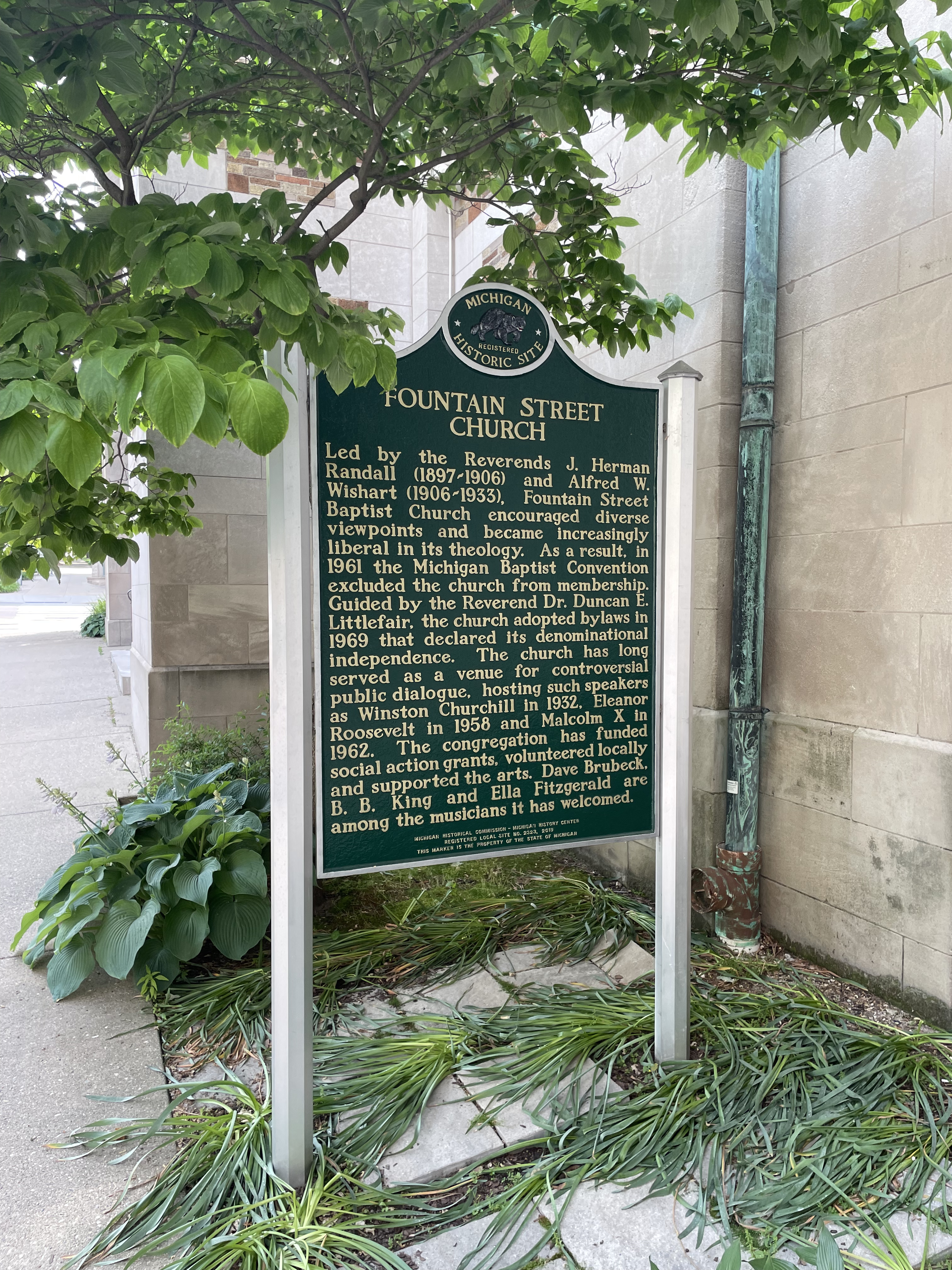
Fountain Street Church historical marker west face

In 1928, three years after his notable defense of John Scopes, Clarence Darrow came to FSC to debate Wishart on the subject of whether a "belief in a general purpose of the universe is rational and justified." Other notables had appeared before at the church, but this particular debate, conducted in the still-new auditorium, marked the beginning of FSC's inviting national and world figures to Grand Rapids to share their opinions. A partial list and description of those who have appeared follows below.

=== After Wishart ===
Wishart died in 1933 while still serving, leaving a church building with a substantial mortgage to pay off at the outset of the Great Depression. His successor, Milton McGorrill, thus endured a difficult ministry, but he was the first FSC preacher to begin broadcasting his sermons. He left after ten years to pursue a more prosperous career on the East Coast; he served both Baptist and Unitarian churches in New England.

Following his departure, Fountain Street Baptist Church found itself at its lowest ebb since 1869: The mortgage took up nearly half of the annual budget and the Great Depression made each year more challenging than the last. Weekly worship attendance was barely above 100, and it was clear that a different and daring direction had to be pursued in order for Fountain Street Church to survive.

The search committee again consulted the University of Chicago Divinity School, taking the university's recommendation to consider a young minister in Kenilworth, Illinois, named Duncan Littlefair.

Arriving in 1944 at the age of 32, Littlefair preached in a manner unprecedented in a town heretofore saturated by a strictly conservative religious culture. His personal manner was also remarkable: He was known to drive a convertible, wear a beret, and smoke cigarettes in public. Scandalous to some and a radical to others, Littlefair nevertheless saw the church grow from less than 200 in weekly attendance to over 1000 regular weekly worshippers shortly after he arrived. At its height under Littlefair's ministry, FSC reckoned over 2000 members.

Littlefair's tenure redefined the church, jettisoning the Baptist name and association, rewriting its bylaws, and restructuring its governance and management. The traditional Sunday School was remodeled on the then-new theory of character development and renamed "Character School." Youth programming at its height involved over 200 high schoolers who brought rock and roll bands as well as lecturers to the church. Many major bands of the era performed there under so-called "Fountain Club" sponsorship, including The Mothers of Invention, The Moody Blues, and Alice Cooper.

It was not until 1960 that FSC formally separated from the American Baptists and dropped its Baptist identity. Littlefair himself had by then changed his clergy affiliation to the UUA; despite his suggestions that FSC should join the denomination, he ultimately preferred that the church remain independent and non-denominational.

Littefair's high-water mark came when friend and member Philip Buchen brought him to Washington, D.C. to give advice on whether President Gerald Ford should pardon President Richard Nixon. Though he was a social liberal, Littlefair defended the action publicly despite strong feelings in the church that doing so was wrong. One lasting effect was the impact of his friend Joseph Campbell. Returning several times over the years, his theories echoed those of Littefair and deeply affected many members' own spiritual life.

Littefair retired in 1980. In 1982, the church selected David O. Rankin of the Unitarian Universalist Congregation of Atlanta to serve it, which he did for 16 years until his retirement. During that time, Rankin penned "Ten Things Commonly Believed Among Us", which continues to be widely used by the Unitarian Universalist Association as well as Fountain Street Church. Rankin was also a regular contributor to American Rabbi magazine and well known in Unitarian circles, serving major churches in San Francisco and Indianapolis prior to coming to Grand Rapids.

Duncan Littlefair, meanwhile, remained active in the congregation, helping to choose Rankin's successor, Brent Smith, who, during his brief tenure, adapted FSC to the Internet age and rebuilt the church's organ. Differences over leadership and finances led to Smith's departure less than two years after his arrival.

Littlefair died in January 2004, at the age of 91. The following fall, Fountain Street Church selected Weldon Frederick Wooden to serve as their Senior Minister. Wooden, too, was a graduate of the University of Chicago Divinity School, making Rankin the only Senior Minister not to have studied under their auspices. He also continued the tradition of senior clergy who are from or connected to Unitarian Universalism, serving 11 years at the UU Congregational Society in Brooklyn New York, following service in Texas and Massachusetts.

Wooden, in fact, shares characteristics of his predecessors. Like Wishart, he had served on the East Coast before coming to FSC. Like McGorrill, he arrived at a time of economic uncertainty in the area. Like Littlefair, he had never before served a large church. Like Rankin, he was more a writer and thinker than an organizer. Like Smith, he knew that 21st-century churches needed to adapt to advancements in technology and media.

In August 2010, the church was defaced with piles of feces at the entrances along with conservative Christian literature. The incident was not reported to the police. The church's "Peace Pole" in support of diversity had also been knocked down several times and now is anchored in concrete.

=== Post-Sesquicentennial ===
The church commemorated its 150th year in 2019 and was registered as a historic site.

In August 2020, the congregation elected the first woman and first nonwhite senior minister, Rev. Mariela Perez-Simons.

In 2022, after the Supreme Court overturned the case which had held abortion was a constitutional right, Roe v. Wade, the church repeated its supports for abortion rights and repeated its support through a support service and encouraging people to argue for abortion rights.

In February 2023, the congregation elected its first queer senior minister, Rev. Christopher Roe.

== Art and architecture ==
Fountain Street's original American Gothic church building, completed in April 1877, was destroyed by a fire in 1917. Under the leadership of senior minister, Rev. Alfred Wesley Wishart, a new church was designed and built over the next seven years. The Italian Romanesque sanctuary was dedicated in February 1924 with seating for approximately 1,500.

Among the artwork which pervades the entire church building are Byzantine-styled oil-painted effigies, murals, coffered walnut and mosaic ceilings, Mercer-tiled floors, Romanesque stone columns and arcades, numerous mosaics (including Raphael’s “Madonna of the Chair”, reproduced by Salviati of Venice), rare furniture artifacts, painted glass, and an Alden B. Dow-designed chapel. A memorial tower room situated between the narthex and the main lobby is dedicated to soldiers who lost their lives in World War I and features a mosaic and gold-leaf domed-ceiling which portrays four guardian angels symbolizing “Justice, Liberty, Peace and Fraternity.”

== Stained glass windows ==
Modeled after the Gothic cathedrals of France, particularly Chartres, FSC's 19 stained glass windows were installed in its new sanctuary in 1924. Traditional Biblical windows adorn the east wall of the sanctuary and depict the law and the Psalms, the Old Testament prophets, the Christ window, the Four Evangelists, and the Parables. Along the west side of the sanctuary are contrasting images that profile “wisdom, service, and freedom.” From Plato to Leonardo da Vinci, Desiderius Erasmus, Louis Pasteur, Charles Darwin, Roger Williams, George Washington, Thomas Jefferson and Abraham Lincoln, these windows reflect “liberty and justice for all.” A Youth Window in the northeast corner of the sanctuary affirms the church's development and nurture of children. High on the north wall is a massive Rose Window which measures 26 feet in diameter and was the first window to be installed in the new sanctuary.

== Notable performers ==
Musicians who have performed there include U2, Arlo Guthrie and B.B. King.

In 2025, comedian Taylor Tomlinson filmed her fourth Netflix special, Prodigal Daughter (2026), at the church.

== Organ ==
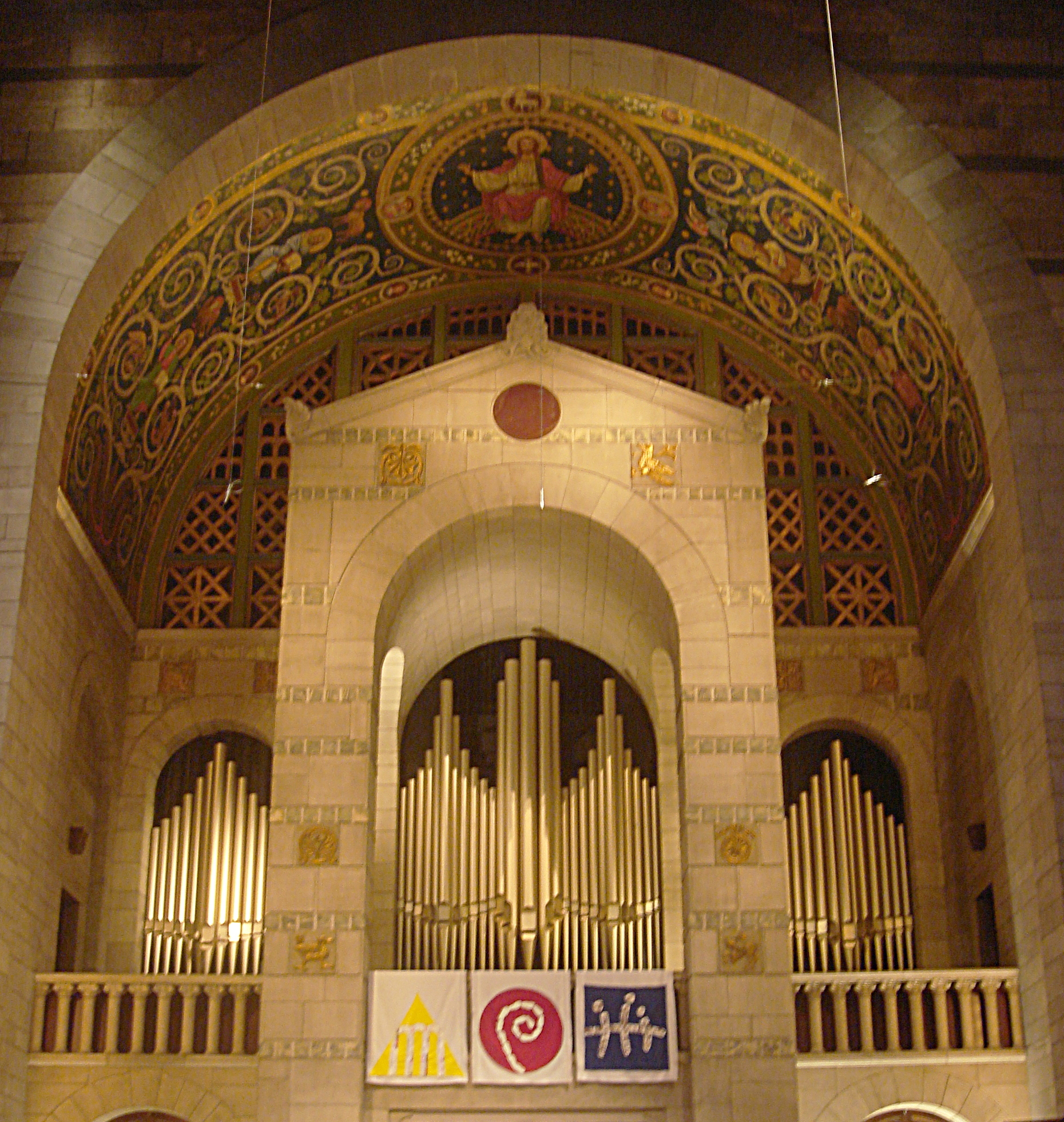
Organ facade

Fountain Street Church houses one of the most comprehensive organs in the Midwest. Dubbed "Catherine the Great," the Austin-Allen organ was first installed in 1924 and fully restored in 2003 through the support of church members. The organ features 8,000 pipes, with the largest being 32 feet high and the smallest the size of a pencil. The five-manual organ of 250 draw knobs has 138 ranks of pipes and 34 digital ranks for a total of 172 ranks (voices).

Records
Preceded by Central School	Tallest Building in Grand Rapids; 1877–1917; 217 feet (66 m)	Succeeded by St Mary's Catholic Church
Preceded by Detroit City Hall	Tallest building in Michigan; April–June 1877	Succeeded by Fort Street Presbyterian Church
