= @midnight =

Game show by Comedy Central

- Also known as: @midnight with Chris Hardwick
- Genre: Improvisational comedy
- Created by: Alex Blagg; Jason Nadler; Jon Zimelis
- Directed by: Ron de Moraes (2013); Michael Dimich (2013–17)
- Presented by: Chris Hardwick
- Theme music composer: Mike Farrell
- Country of origin: United States
- Original language: English
- No. of seasons: 4 + 1 pilot season
- No. of episodes: 600

Production
- Executive producers: Robert Ben Garant; Thomas Lennon; Mike Farah; Jack Martin; Chris Hardwick; Alex Blagg; Jason Nadler; Jon Zimelis; Alex Murray
- Production locations: Hollywood Center Studios, Los Angeles, California
- Editors: Clark Burnett; Asaf Eisenberg
- Running time: 22 minutes
- Production companies: Funny or Die; Garant Lennon Productions; Nerdist Industries; Serious Business; Brillstein Entertainment Partners

Original release
- Network: Comedy Central
- Release: October 21, 2013 – August 4, 2017

Related
- After Midnight (TV series)

@midnight with Chris Hardwick (shortened to and formerly exclusively titled @midnight) is an American late night Internet-themed panel game show, hosted by Chris Hardwick, that aired Monday through Thursday nights between October 21, 2013, and August 4, 2017, on Comedy Central. It was syndicated internationally in Australia on SBS Viceland and The Comedy Channel, in the United Kingdom on Comedy Central Extra, and in Canada formerly on MuchMusic and later on The Comedy Network.

@midnight received a nomination for Outstanding Interactive Program at the 66th Primetime Emmy Awards. It received a nomination and win for Outstanding Social TV Experience at the 67th Primetime Emmy Awards.

On July 18, 2017, Comedy Central, Chris Hardwick, and Funny or Die mutually agreed to end @midnight with Chris Hardwick. The final episode, the 600th, aired on August 4, 2017. In February 2023, it was reported that Comedy Central's current sister broadcast network CBS was considering a revival of @midnight to serve as a replacement for The Late Late Show after the end of James Corden's tenure. On November 1, 2023, executive producer Stephen Colbert announced Taylor Tomlinson would be the host of the rebooted panel talk show, rebranded as After Midnight, accounting for the 12:30am timeslot.

== Format ==
Three guests compete in a series of Internet-themed improv games. "Rapid Refresh" is a game where contestants craft a funny response or choose an answer based on an Internet meme or trending news headline. On Thursdays during the run-up to the 2016 presidential primaries, this round was alternately referred to as "Panderdome" and focused on the candidates' gaffes and antics. Other games run daily include "Hashtag Wars" in which contestants buzz in with a phrase based on the given hashtag theme, and where fans can submit their own tweets which may show up in the game, and "Live Challenges" where the contestants write their answers over the commercial break. Hardwick would shout "Points!" and give the contestants arbitrary amounts.

Towards the end of the game, the third-place contestant is eliminated (with some rare exceptions), the scores are erased with a gesture, and the remaining two contestants play the final round called "FTW (For the Win)" Hardwick would read a question and the contestants would write down a response. The responses would then be read back anonymously, and the winner would be decided by one whose response generates the most laughter/applause from the studio audience. The winner "wins the Internet for the next 23.5 hours".

=== Recurring games ===
- Audio Quiz: The panelists must identify the source of a sound from a list of possibilities.
- Confession Bear: Chris gives the panel partial confessions from Reddit that use the Confession Bear meme, and the panelists must complete them.
- Cringe-Worthy: Based on the popular Reddit forum of the same name, the panelists come up with three-word phrases to make Chris cringe.
- Defriend Me: The panelists create Facebook statuses that would lead to Chris removing them as friends.
- eBay Price Is Right: The panelists attempt to guess the "buy it now" price of strange items for sale on eBay The Price Is Right style.
- Etsy Pitchmen: The panelists write taglines to boost the appeal of bizarre Etsy products.
- Free on Craigslist: A sixty-second game where the panelists list things they would give away for free.
- Goth Confessions: The panelists must guess which admissions goth kids made in their YouTube videos.
- Iron Sheik: Real or Jabroni: Chris reads a topic that The Iron Sheik has tweeted about, and the contestants must decide if the wrestler loves or hates the subject. The tweet is read after the contestant is told they are right or wrong.
- JuggalOK Cupid: The panelists must figure out which bizarre OkCupid dating profile description of a Juggalo is real.
- Linked Out: The panelists come up with ridiculous job titles that one might find on LinkedIn.
- Name That Vine: The panelists name the shown Vine video.
- Photobomb: The panelists decide if an edited out photobomb is creepy or cute.
- Rich Cat or Poor Cat: The panelists decide if it is a cash cat or a cat being humiliated by someone else on the internet.
- Sweet Emoji: The panelists translate emoji sentences.
- Texts from Last Night: The panelists respond to embarrassing drunk text messages.
- Thug Life or Hug Life: The panelists are shown the image of a child from a YouTube video and have to guess whether the video content would be thug or cute hug worthy.
- TumblReality: The panelists must figure out which bizarre Tumblr blog title is real.
- Tumblr? I Hardly Know Her: The panelists think up new Tumblr blogs that are just strange enough to be real.
- Yahoo Answers: Chris asks the panelists to come up with funnier responses than the ones on Yahoo! Answers.

=== Other gimmicks ===
The @midnight website provided a complete list of guests who have appeared on the show to date with a leaderboard that indicated who appeared the most and who had the most wins.

== Production ==
The initial pilot for the show was called "Tweeter Dome" and was hosted by Thomas Lennon. It was revamped with Chris Hardwick as host, and trialed in the summer before airing at The Meltdown Comics store backroom. Lennon remained as co-executive producer throughout the run.

The show was shot on Stage 2 of the Hollywood Center Studios, where the CBS series I Love Lucy was originally shot.

=== Revival ===
In February 2023, Deadline Hollywood reported that CBS (which, following the re-merger of CBS Corporation with Viacom, had once again became a sister to Comedy Central) was considering a revival of the series to replace The Late Late Show, after James Corden concluded his tenure on the program later in the year. The network had explored replacing the Late Late Show franchise with other, more cost-effective concepts besides a traditional late-night talk show. The report indicated that Stephen Colbert (who hosts its lead-in The Late Show, and formerly hosted Comedy Central's The Colbert Report) would serve as executive producer, and that Hardwick would not be involved. Pre-production of the series was halted due to the 2023 Hollywood labor disputes.

In a June 2023 panel hosted by Deadline, CBS CEO George Cheeks stated that the network wanted to "experiment and try new things" in the post-Late Show timeslot, and explained of Colbert's involvement that "in a world when you're trying so hard to sort of drive awareness of the show's launch, to have Colbert, the number one late-night show, as executive producer and the integrated support he's going to have, because he's actually invested in the success of the show." On November 1, 2023, CBS announced the revival under the title After Midnight for a premiere on January 16, 2024, with Jack Martin retained as showrunner alongside Eric Pierce. On that night's episode of The Late Show, Colbert subsequently revealed stand-up comedian Taylor Tomlinson as the show's new host.

== Reception ==
During its initial 2013 run, the series averaged 453,000 viewers in the 18–49 ratings demographic, putting it above Bravo's Watch What Happens Live, E!'s Chelsea Lately, and TBS's The Pete Holmes Show. It also had the youngest audience of any late-night television show.

The week of February 17, 2014, was reported to be the show's highest rated to date; the show had 731,000 total viewers, and it tied The Daily Show as the most-watched late-night program on cable in the 18–34 demographic.

== Awards ==
Award	Category	Result	Ref.
2014 Creative Arts Emmy Award	Outstanding Interactive Program	Nominated	
2015 Creative Arts Emmy Award	Outstanding Interactive Program	Nominated	
2015 Creative Arts Emmy Award	Outstanding Creative Achievement In Interactive Media Social TV Experience	Won	
2016 Creative Arts Emmy Award	Outstanding Creative Achievement In Interactive Media Social TV Experience	Won	

== Episodes ==
Year	Episodes	Season Premiere	Season Finale	Notes
2013	16	October 21, 2013	November 14, 2013	Pilot season
2014	160	January 6, 2014	December 18, 2014	
2015	161	January 5, 2015	December 17, 2015	
2016	161	January 4, 2016	December 15, 2016	
2017	102	January 3, 2017	August 4, 2017	Final year
2013–2017	600	October 21, 2013	August 4, 2017	Totals

== See also ==
- Failosophy, an MTV game show with a panel of comedian competitors
- Dropout's Um, Actually
