= Taylor Tomlinson =

American stand-up comedian (born 1993)

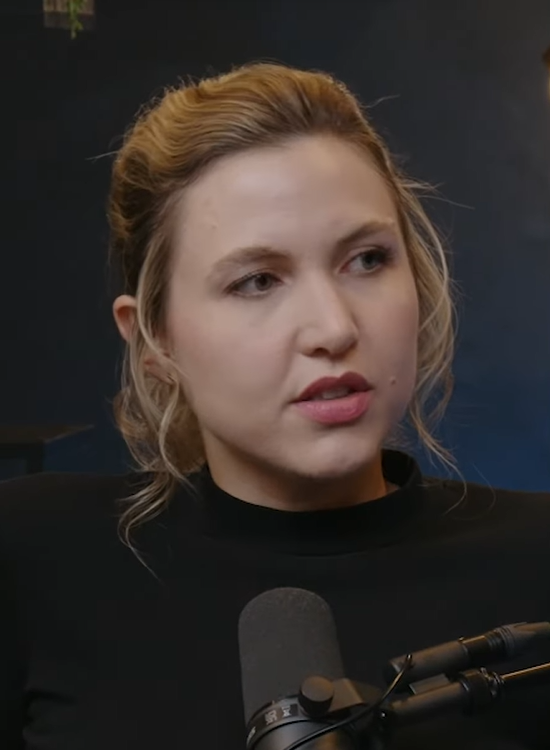
- Tomlinson in 2023
- Born: Taylor Elyse Tomlinson; November 4, 1993 (age 33); California, U.S.
- Education: Palomar College
- Occupation: Stand-up comedian

Comedy career
- Years active: 2010–present
- Medium: Stand-up; television
- Genres: Observational comedy; improvisational comedy; blue comedy; surreal humor; sarcasm; satire
- Subjects: American culture; Christianity; everyday life; mental health; human sexuality; pop culture; self-deprecation
- Website: taylortomlinsoncomedy.com

Taylor Elyse Tomlinson (born November 4, 1993) is an American stand-up comedian. She has released four Netflix stand-up specials: Quarter-Life Crisis (2020), Look At You (2022), Have It All (2024) and Prodigal Daughter (2026). She hosted the CBS late-night show After Midnight, which ran from January 2024 through June 2025.

== Early life ==
Taylor Tomlinson was born on November 4, 1993, in California. Tomlinson and her three younger siblings were raised in a devout Christian family, which features prominently in her comedy routines. Her mother died of cancer in August 2002, when Tomlinson was eight, and her father remarried a year later. She was raised in Temecula, California, where she graduated from Temecula Valley High School.

Tomlinson briefly attended California Polytechnic State University in San Luis Obispo, before transferring to Palomar College, a community college in the San Diego metropolitan area, to be closer to comedy clubs and sustain her career. She then attended California State University San Marcos but eventually dropped out to pursue her budding comedy career full time.

== Career ==
Tomlinson began performing comedy at age 16, after her father signed them both up for a stand-up class. She performed in church basements, school venues, and coffee shops. She was 19 when she decided that comedy would be her career.

Tomlinson became a top-ten finalist on the ninth season of NBC's Last Comic Standing in 2015 and was named one of the 2018 "Top 10 Comics to Watch" by Variety at the Just for Laughs Festival. She has appeared on The Tonight Show, Conan, and various Comedy Central productions. She developed a sitcom for ABC in 2017, in which she would play a character with a religious upbringing living with her two younger sisters. It was not picked up for a pilot. She performed a fifteen-minute set on an episode of the Netflix stand-up series The Comedy Lineup in 2018. Between November and December 2018, she served as one of the opening acts for Conan O'Brien's tour Team Coco Presents Conan & Friends: An Evening of Stand-Up and Investment Tips.

Tomlinson's first Netflix stand-up special, Quarter-Life Crisis, was released in March 2020. Later that year, she toured with fellow comedian Whitney Cummings on the Codependent Tour. She was placed on the Forbes 30 Under 30 list in December 2021.

In February 2022, Variety announced that Village Roadshow Pictures had acquired the rights to create a film based on the life of Tomlinson. It was set to be directed by Paul Weitz, and she would serve as a screenwriter and co-producer (together with Taylor Tetreau), while also starring in the movie. Her second Netflix stand-up special, Look At You, was released in March 2022.

In September 2023, she made her debut at the Radio City Music Hall in New York City. Her third Netflix special, Have It All, was filmed in Washington, D.C. at the end of November 2023 and was released on February 13, 2024. Among comics in the Top 10 list of the highest-grossing comic tour for 2023, Tomlinson was the only woman and performed more shows (132) than anyone else on the list. The tour sold 296,000 tickets and generated over $17.5 million in sales.

On November 1, 2023, it was announced that Tomlinson would host After Midnight, a CBS revival of former Comedy Central panel show @midnight. The show premiered on January 17, 2024. She took the job on the condition that she would only record the show three days a week so she could perform comedy gigs on weekends. While After Midnight was initially renewed for a third season, CBS eventually decided to cancel the show after its second season, which ended in June 2025, since Tomlinson had decided to leave the show to focus on her stand-up career.

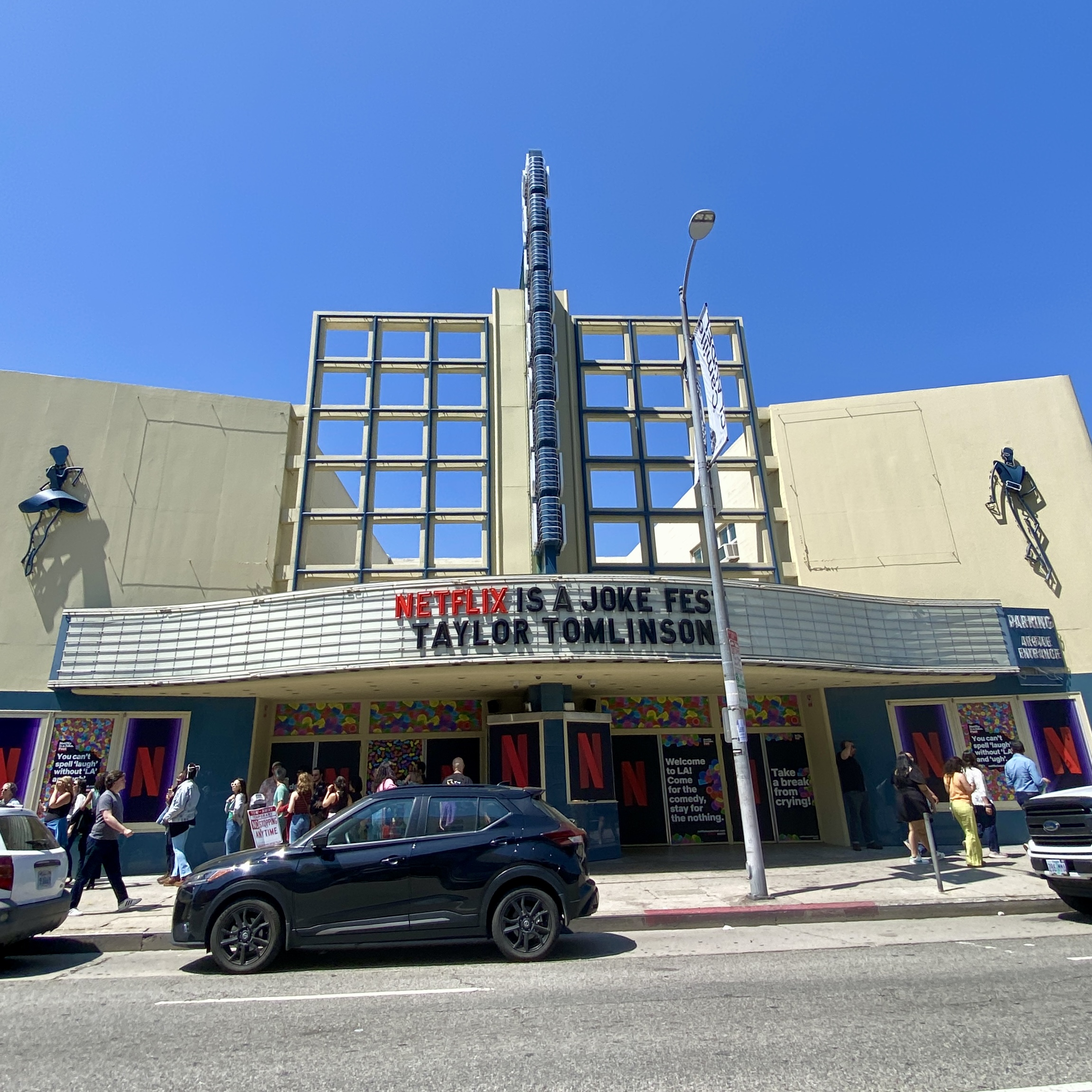
Taylor Tomlinson show at the Hollywood Palladium, 2024

On June 16, 2024, Tomlinson served as one of the presenters at the 77th Tony Awards, held at Lincoln Center's David H. Koch Theater in New York City, and aired on CBS. The following month, she announced the dates for the first leg of her stand-up tour, Save Me. On October 16, it was announced that Tomlinson would release her first book, Actually, Nevermind, through Gallery Books.

Tomlinson's fourth comedy special Prodigal Daughter was released on Netflix on February 24, 2026. Prodigal Daughter was filmed on December 13, 2025, at Fountain Street Church in Grand Rapids, Michigan.

=== Social media ===
Tomlinson has gained further success by using TikTok, having become the seventh-most-followed female comedian on the platform in 2022. Her popularity helped her acquire a sponsorship from Hotels.com, which she promotes on TikTok.

In 2020, Tomlinson was part of the podcast Self-Helpless, together with fellow comedians Kelsey Cook and Delanie Fischer. The following year, she began hosting a short-term video podcast, titled Sad in the City and distributed on YouTube.

== Influences ==
Tomlinson has said her two biggest comedy influences are Brian Regan and Maria Bamford. She said about them, "I loved Brian Regan and Maria Bamford when I was younger—and still do. Regan is just one of the greats, and also the nicest person. And you could listen to him with your whole family and know everyone would enjoy it. I love everything Maria Bamford does. She's so different from anyone else out there, and she talks about mental health in such a hilarious, vulnerable, amazing way." She has also gone on to cite Richard Pryor, Dave Chappelle, Conan O'Brien, Bert Kreischer, and John Mulaney as comedians she idolizes.

== Personal life ==
In her stand-up material, Tomlinson has frequently referred to her experiences with mental health issues, including depression, panic attacks, and night terrors. She said she has struggled with depression and anxiety since her adolescence, while also noting how she felt "very hopeful about the future" as a teenager, citing her "very rich and fulfilling" imagination as a main factor for it. In her 2022 special Look at You, she discussed being diagnosed with bipolar disorder. Tomlinson is agnostic.

In her first special, Quarter-Life Crisis (2020), Tomlinson said that she had once gotten engaged, but had called the marriage off before the taping of the show. She was in a relationship with fellow comedian Sam Morril from March 2020 to February 2022. In April 2020, as they were quarantined during the COVID-19 pandemic, they started New Couple Gets Quarantined, a web series chronicling the experience of being quarantined together as a couple. They made a podcast together, This is important to me with Sam Morril and Taylor Tomlinson, where Morril and Tomlinson picked their respective favorite movies the other one hadn't watched.

In her 2024 special Have It All, Tomlinson came out as bisexual, joking about her experiences trying to date women. She also discussed her three siblings, including a transgender brother and a lesbian sister.

== Filmography ==
=== Television ===
Year	Title	Role	Notes
2015	Last Comic Standing	Herself	7 episodes (Season 9)
2017–2019	Conan	Herself	2 episodes
2018	The Comedy Lineup	Herself	1 episode
2019	What Just Happened??! with Fred Savage	Herself	9 episodes
2024–2025	After Midnight	Herself (host)	2 seasons (199 episodes)

=== Stand-up specials ===
Year	Title	Notes
2020	Quarter-Life Crisis	Netflix Originals special
2022	Look At You	Netflix Originals special
2024	Have It All	Netflix Originals special
2026	Prodigal Daughter	Netflix Originals special

== Bibliography ==
In 2026, Tomlinson published a collection of autobiographical essays titled Actually, Nevermind.

== See also ==
- List of people with bipolar disorder

== Sources ==
- Symons, Alex (2023). Women Comedians in the Digital Age. Routledge. doi:10.4324/9781003268680. ISBN 978-1-003-26868-0. OCLC 1349461077.
