= Alex Blagg =

American writer and producer

- Born: July 1, 1980 (age 46); California, USA
- Occupations: Writer; Comedian; Producer
- Known for: @midnight; Problematic with Moshe Kasher

Alex Blagg (born July 1, 1980) is an American writer, comedian and producer. He is best known as the co-creator and executive producer of Comedy Central's Emmy-winning late-night show, @midnight, and Comedy Central's talk show Problematic with Moshe Kasher. He is also the creator of the satirical blog and video series A Bajillion Hits.

== Career ==
As an executive producer, Blagg was the co-founder and head of creative for comedy production company Serious Business. He has also been a writer/producer for Workaholics, Splitting Up Together, Alone Together, Betas and Trinkets, for which he won a Daytime Emmy for Outstanding Young Adult Series. Before becoming a writer and producer for television, he co-founded and was the managing editor of the Best Week Ever blog for VH1. He was also an editor-in-chief of MSN's Wonderwall at BermanBraun and was the head of celebrity programming for Buzzmedia. The @midnight show ended after its 600th episode.

== Awards ==
Awards	Category	Result	Ref
2014 Streamy Award	Best Television Show @midnight (2013)	Won	
2014–2015 – Primetime Emmy Awards	Social TV Experience (@midnight)	Won	
2015–2016 – Primetime Emmy Awards	Social TV Experience (@midnight)	Won	
2020 – Daytime Emmy Awards	Outstanding Young Adult Series (Trinkets)	Won	
