= Planet Scum Live =

American comedy network

- Type: Live Streaming Content
- Country: United States
- Availability: National and Worldwide
- Language: English

Planet Scum Live was an American comedy network founded by Chris Gethard and broadcast live on the Twitch streaming service. It was also the name of the weekly show that Gethard has hosted on the network starting May 3, 2020.

Initially, after the COVID-19 pandemic closed down production on Gethards MNN public access show Chris Gethard Presents, the Planet Scum Live network was built around the weekly live Wednesday show, but since its launch, the network of comedians Gethard had been working with at MNN have added their own separate shows to the live platform, and it now hosts a wide variety of programming six days a week, each show created and hosted by a different comedian.

== Current Programming ==
Day	Title	Host	Premiere date	Time
Monday	Who Wants $2.69 With Martin Urbano	Martin Urbano	July 20, 2020	8PM ET
Tuesday	Mary Houlihans Painting Party	Mary Houlihan	Sep 22, 2020	8PM ET
Wednesday	Planet Scum Live	Christi Chiello, Will Hines, Pickle & Chris Gethard	May 3, 2020	10PM ET
Wednesday	Late Night With Judge Milly	Milly Tamarez	August 29, 2020	10PM ET (last Wed of the month)
Thursday	Dykevice with Robby Hoffman	Robby Hoffman	May 17, 2020 - February 2021	10PM ET
Thursday	Make Yourself Cry With Kenice Mobley	Kenice Mobley	August 4, 2021	10PM ET
Saturday	Googy Mornings	Riley Soloner	May 23, 2020	11AM ET
Sunday	The George Lucas Talk Show	Connor Ratliff (as George Lucas), Griffin Newman (as Watto) & Patrick Cotnoir	May 4, 2020	8PM ET
