= The George Lucas Talk Show =

American improvised talk show

- Genre: Talk show; Alternative comedy; Improvisational comedy
- Show type: Panel talk show
- Date of premiere: February 28, 2014
- Location: Upright Citizens Brigade Theatre, New York City, US; Friend Zone; Formerly Planet Scum Live

Creative team
- Creator: Connor Ratliff
- Starring: Connor Ratliff; Griffin Newman; Patrick Cotnoir; Shaun Diston
- Producers: Patrick Cotnoir; David Szarejko
- Composer: Ryan Miller
- Official website

The George Lucas Talk Show is an improvised talk show in New York City hosted by comedian Connor Ratliff, who appears as Star Wars creator George Lucas and interviews real guests as themselves in a panel format. He is joined by sidekick Star Wars characters: initially Jar Jar Binks, played by comedian Shaun Diston; and in current shows, Watto, played by Griffin Newman. The show premiered in 2014, and was performed monthly live on stage at the Upright Citizens Brigade Theatre. The show is produced and booked by Patrick Cotnoir.

On May 4, 2020, after a brief hiatus due to the COVID-19 pandemic, the show returned in an online format on the comedy network Planet Scum Live to host a more-than-30-hour livestream in which Lucas, Watto, and Cotnoir (now acting as an on-air co-host), live from their own separate homes, watched every Star Wars movie in chronological order to raise money for the out-of-work employees of the UCB Theatre.

After going on hiatus on April 11, 2021, the show returned to streaming on a monthly basis on August 23, 2021 and has resumed performing live theatre shows at venues across the United States.

== History ==
=== Conception and development ===
In an interview with We Are Trash People, Ratliff stated that he had begun playing the character of George Lucas "starting back in the late 1990s, when George Lucas was doing special editions of the original trilogy. I started doing a Lucas character for my friends, explaining why the changes being made were great", and continued to do the George Lucas character for friends to argue the artistic direction and changes made in the Star Wars universe. Talking with Village Voice, Ratliff said that he conceived of the idea of portraying Lucas "sort of as a preemptive strike against feeling bad about the prequels". He said "maybe Lucas had reached a point of absolute creative control and no one to really tell him if something is a bad idea, I started doing this character" and also that Lucas is renowned for some of his large failures that were wildly successful.

In 2013, Ratliff unsuccessfully attempted to mount a one-man show called Local Authors Night at the Mid-Missouri Library at the UCB Theatre. After its rejection, Ratliff decided to audition a new show that had a bigger popular culture hook to draw in audiences. In 2014, Ratliff brought the first iteration of The George Lucas Talk Show to various New York City venues, which he said were "high quality comedy-wise, low quality attendance-wise".

Ratliff, Griffin Newman, and Patrick Cotnoir had known each other through their work on The Chris Gethard Show and ASSSSCAT 3000 at the UCB Theater. During the early days of the show, Cotnoir attended as an audience member and acted as a last minute fill in warm up comic during the first show. Ratliff asked Newman to be a guest as himself to promote his work in the film Draft Day, wanting a guest to be there "promoting a thing".

=== Theatre show ===
Ratliff launched the show in the spring of 2014 at the UCB Theater East venue in New York City, with Shaun Diston playing Jar Jar Binks as co-host. Ratliff's costuming as Lucas consists of his frosted hair and beard, and lumberjack-fashion clothes, while Diston wore a Jar Jar Binks costume and a pair of large ears on his head. The shows ran monthly at midnight. As Lucas, Ratliff would perform monologues and host guest interviews that often referred to Lucas's own work in the entertainment industry, from filmographic references to his pioneering special effects and audio companies in Industrial Light & Magic and THX.

Cotnoir had been helping minimally behind the scenes of the show, and during a conversation, Ratliff referred to Cotnoir as "my producer", unbeknownst to Cotnoir. A few years into the show, Diston moved to LA. Ratliff and Newman had performed together in a show at the UCB Theatre called Star Wars Improv, where Newman had dressed in a costume of Watto, the merchant from The Phantom Menace, he had assembled to attend a midnight screening of The Force Awakens, while Ratliff dressed in a high quality Boba Fett costume; halfway through the show, Ratliff removed his Boba Fett helmet to reveal himself in full George Lucas makeup and performed the remainder of the show as George Lucas. After this, Newman eagerly "pestered" Ratliff to let him join as the cohost: "If Diston's Jar Jar was doing Kevin Eubanks, laughing at all of George's jokes and supporting him, then my Watto is going to be the more cantankerous, 'is he even paying attention' Ed McMahon cohost". In 2016, Newman worked on both The George Lucas Talk Show and the Amazon's television series The Tick.

Featured guests of the theatre shows included Jon Hamm, Janeane Garofalo, Nicole Byer, Sonia Manzano, Ira Glass, Chris Gethard, Ben Schwartz, Peter Serafinowicz, Bobby Moynihan, David K. Harbour, Solo writer Jonathan Kasdan, Meredith Vieira, and musicians like Aimee Mann, Mike Doughty, and Will Butler.

The show has been performed at the UCB theater in Los Angeles., had shows at South By Southwest and New York Comic Con, and in London. On November 13, 2019, The George Lucas Talk Show held a show inside New York City's Intrepid Sea, Air & Space Museum.

=== Streaming show ===
In March 2020, while Ratliff was performing on tour with rock band Guster, the COVID-19 pandemic escalated to the point where the remaining dates of the tour had to be postponed. While Ratliff had been on tour, Griffin Newman had been performing one-man musical revue shows at the UCB Theatre as Watto, with a May the 4th episode of The George Lucas Talk Show being prepared as their first show after a brief hiatus.

Ratliff, Newman, and Cotnoir put together a May the 4th Show on Chris Gethard's Planet Scum Live comedy network; Connor was not interested in the prospect of taking the live show to an online format, thinking that “it was going to be bad and more people would see it (than the live show) and it would diminish the reputation of the live show as retroactive bad press”. He presented two ideas to Griffin and Patrick; one would be to book George Lucas himself as a guest, and the other was to do a show for charity. A GoFundMe page had been set up to benefit the out-of-work UCB Theatre employees and it solidified the interest in bringing the show back in a new format. During discussions on what exactly they would do during the live stream, Connor brought up the idea to watch all fourteen canonical live-action Star Wars film in chronological order, including all 9 films of the Skywalker Saga; Solo; Rogue One; the two Ewok movies; and the Star Wars Holiday Special. Said Ratliff: “If we don't do the Ewok movies, the whole thing isn't worth doing.” The marathon ran over 30 hours and featured multiple guests, raising funds for the UCB Theatre's unemployed staff.

Following the Star Wars marathon fundraiser, The George Lucas Talk Show was revived as a weekly four-hour Sunday evening broadcast which typically included two guests for the show proper and additional surprise guest appearances during the aftershow. Once every month, the show hosted additional marathon fundraisers, watching TV shows like Arli$$, 1600 Penn, Big Lake, Studio 60 on the Sunset Strip, Muppets Tonight, and On The Air. During the marathons, some of the cast and crew of the related series made guest appearances. Through these fundraising events, The George Lucas Talk Show raised over $167,000 for various charities and organizations. Frequent guests of the streamed iteration included Chris Gethard, Robert Wuhl, Zach Cherry, and Rich Sommer, the latter making occasional appearances as a character named Steven Charleston. Notable guests included Rachel Zegler, Julian Glover, Sarah Natochenny, Lea Thompson, Dana Ashbrook, Richard Kind, Jason Mantzoukas, Haley Joel Osment, Emily St. James, Adam Conover, Noah Segan, Mara Wilson, Bill Oakley, Cheri Oteri, Alan Sepinwall, Patton Oswalt, the McElroy brothers, Tony Hale, Paul F. Tompkins, Terry Notary, Sasheer Zamata, Bruce Vilanch, Ethan Slater, Angelo Badalamenti, Brian Henson, Ahmed Best, and Bob Odenkirk in his first media appearance following a heart attack.

On April 11, 2021, it was announced via social media that the show would be going on an indefinite hiatus. On July 18, 2021, the show returned in the form of a mostly text-based episode (done in the style of the Star Wars opening crawl which on the show has a sentient personality known as Crawly) announcing that it would return to the monthly live stage show format, though these shows would be recorded and streamed on PlanetScum shortly afterward. A one-off "test show" was broadcast on August 21, 2021, maintaining the streaming show format but featuring Ratliff, Newman, and Cotnoir performing in-studio together for the first time since the start of the COVID-19 pandemic.

=== Return to live performance and Star Wars readings ===
On May 4, 2022, the host site Planet Scum Live announced their closure come the end of the month. That evening, The George Lucas Talk Show broadcast their "First Annual Describe-A-Thon" in which "George", "Watto" and Patrick described the various films and TV shows in the Star Wars franchise as part of a Star Wars Day celebration. During the broadcast, they announced this would be their last broadcast on Planet Scum and the next broadcast would be on the Friend Zone Twitch channel owned by comedian and frequent guest Paul Scheer. The show now mixes live and broadcast performances, with guests of this iteration including Rachel Zegler, Paul Scheer, Jason Mantzoukas, Zach Cherry, Paul F. Tompkins, Richard Kind, Aimee Mann, "Weird Al" Yankovic, Seth Meyers, Steve Whitmire, D'Arcy Carden, Marceline Hugot, Andrew Barth Feldman, Gary Whitta, Jean Grae, David Krumholtz, Lee Unkrich, X Mayo, Rob Huebel, Brian Michael Bendis, Britt Lower, Lance Bangs, Kate Walsh, Melissa Fumero, James Austin Johnson, Thomas Lennon, Amber Nash, Shawn Levy, Robert Lopez & Kristen Anderson-Lopez, Bebe Neuwirth, Michael Giacchino, Nina West, David Cross, Padma Lakshmi, Matt Zoller Seitz, Adam Scott, Karen Prell, H. Jon Benjamin, Colin Hanks, Amy Irving, and Seth Rogen.

In 2024 the show began hosting a series of live staged readings of the Star Wars screenplays at the Hayworth Theatre in conjunction with the 25th anniversary of The Phantom Menace. The titles of each reading spoof each installment in the Muppet film franchise.

The cast for the Prequel trilogy included Tony Hale as Qui-Gon Jinn, Vic Michaelis as Obi-Wan Kenobi, Haley Joel Osment as Anakin Skywalker, Bobby Moynihan as Yoda and Jango Fett, JoJo Ginn as R2-D2, Eric Bauza (as Daffy Duck) as Jar-Jar Binks, and Daniel Logan reprising his role as Boba Fett. The roles of Padme, Mace Windu, and Palpatine were each played by a different performer for each reading. Tawny Newsome, Jessica McKenna, and Mary Elizabeth Ellis each performed Padme. Krystina Arielle, Debra Wilson, and Kel Mitchell each performed Mace Windu. Diana Lee Inosanto, Nina West, and Paul F. Tompkins each performed Palpatine. Additional roles were performed by Vivien Lyra Blair, Hal Lublin, Matt Gourley, Seth Green, Jacob Wysocki, Eric Bauza, and Laraine Newman, amongst others.

The cast for the original trilogy included Rich Sommer as Luke Skywalker, Eric Edelstein as Chewbacca, JoJo Ginn as R2-D2, Ify Nwadiwe as Lando Calrissian, Haley Joel Osment as Anakin Skywalker, and James Urbaniak as Grand Moff Tarkin. Multiple roles were split across the readings. Tatiana Maslany, Melissa Fumero, and Jessica Williams each performed Princess Leia. Richard Kind, Diedrich Bader, and Clancy Brown each performed Darth Vader. D'Arcy Carden, Danny Pudi, and Jack Quaid each performed Han Solo. Zac Oyama, Ron Funches, and Jon Cryer each performed C-3PO. David Wain and Mike Mitchell each performed Yoda. Nina West and Jared Harris each performed Palpatine. Fred Melamed and Maurice LaMarche each performed Obi-Wan Kenobi. Additional roles were performed by Andy Daly, Hal Lublin, Matt Gourley, Laraine Newman, Aristotle Athari, Janet Varney, Mike Mitchell, Jeff Rosenstock, Paul Brittain, Kirk Thatcher, and John Milhiser, amongst others. Only Ginn and West returned for the reading of the Holiday Special, whose cast also included Griffin Newman, Adam Pally, Mary Holland, Rob Huebel, and Paul Scheer, amongst others.

The cast for the sequel trilogy included Sommer, Edelstein, and Ginn reprising their roles, as well as Vic Michaelis as Rey, Lou Wilson as Finn, Taran Killam as Poe Dameron and General Hux, Kevin Smith as Han Solo, Wil Wheaton as C-3PO, Dana Gould (as Dr. Zaius from Planet of the Apes) as Supreme Leader Snoke, Gil Ozeri as BB-8, Irene Choi as Rose, Caitlin Reilly as Admiral Holdo, and François Chau as DJ and Yoda. David Dastmalchian and Joe Lo Truglio each performed Kylo Ren. Wendi McLendon-Covey and Daphne Zuniga each performed General Leia, the latter in a joke on her role as the Leia parody character Princess Vespa in Spaceballs. Additional roles were performed by Hal Lublin, Laraine Newman, Alison Rich, Alex Song-Xia, and Shaun Diston, amongst others.

== Reception ==
Reception for The George Lucas Talk Show has been overwhelmingly positive. Comic Book Resources writer Annalise Yip says it is "equal parts hilarious, weird and entertaining". David Axe from The National Interest found the show to be "weird, and very very funny." He wrote "Loosely mimicking the famously uncharismatic Lucas, Ratliff delivers a profoundly bad monologue then interviews comedians, actors and musicians while -- in the early episodes, at least -- his sidekick Jar Jar Binks [...] chortles on the couch."

Writing about their marathon fundraisers, Liz Shannon Miller from Collider says "anything can happen... The one thing you can count on is that while watching all 22 episodes of Studio 60 on the Sunset Strip, a good time will be had". Paige Kiser from Flip Screen wrote that it is "a new kind of show that offers accessibility and silly, entertaining moments you won't likely see anywhere else (what other show has Lea Thompson showing off her Howard the Duck costumes from her house?)... The George Lucas Talk Show is reminding some of us why we loved Star Wars in the first place."

On their new live streaming format, Sean L. McCarthy of The New York Times writes "One thing Twitch allows that live theater never can: light-speed interactivity among performers and the public alike... audience members contributed fan art and memes related to discussion topics in real time, while Newman was able to display a cup topped with a Watto figurine as soon as one of the guests, the actor Taran Killam, mentioned once owning one as a child." Julia Blyth of Just Resting My Eyes says it is "fresh, inventive and surprising every week... (a) shiny kernel of beauty thats both a comfort and, weirdly, an inspiration", and The Comedy Bureau notes that the show "naturally fits into the Twitch-verse of comedy."
