= List of The Chris Gethard Show episodes =

The Chris Gethard Show is a television show created by and starring comedian Chris Gethard.

The series aired 201 episodes and 20 specials from June 22, 2011, to December 4, 2020, on the public-access Manhattan Neighborhood Network and cable networks Fusion and truTV.

== Series overview ==
Season	Episodes	Originally released		
Season	Episodes	First released	Last released	Network
MNN 1	141	June 22, 2011	August 20, 2014	MNN
MNN 2	11	September 24, 2014	December 17, 2014	MNN
MNN 3	3	January 17, 2015	January 28, 2015	MNN
Fusion 1	10	May 28, 2015	August 13, 2015	Fusion
Fusion 2	10	March 30, 2016	June 1, 2016	Fusion
truTV	26	August 3, 2017	May 29, 2018	truTV
Specials	20	December 28, 2011	December 4, 2020	various

== Manhattan Neighborhood Network (2011–15) ==
=== Season 1 (2011–14) ===
No.	Title	Musical guest	Original release date
1	"The First Episode"	Mikey Erg	June 22, 2011
Guests: Don Fanelli, John Gemberling, Anthony Atamanuik, Diana Kolsky, Jesse Lee
2	"The Episode Where Everything Started"	none	June 29, 2011
Random: Jean
3	"The Third Episode Episode"	none	July 6, 2011
Random: Jean
4	"The Tazapper Episode"	none	July 13, 2011
Random: Jean; Guest: Horatio Sanz
5	"The Whiffle Bat Gang Episode"	Slangcorp	July 20, 2011
Random: Jean; Guest: Bobby Moynihan
6	"The Last Small Studio Show"	none	July 27, 2011
Random: Jean
7	"The Hands on a Studio Audience Member Episode"	Modern Rivals	August 3, 2011
Random: Jean; Guest: Joe Mande
8	"The Kickboxer Episode"	The Dolchnakov Brigade	August 10, 2011
Random: Jean; Guests: John Mulaney and Matt Besser
9	"The Dance Battle Episode"	The Ouroboros (Dance Crew)	August 17, 2011
Random: Jean
10	"The Human Crane Episode"	mc chris	August 24, 2011
Random: Jean; Guest: Patrick Cassels
11	"The How Random Is Random Jean Episode"	Phil Jackson, The Panel, and the Studio Audience	August 31, 2011
Random: Jean
12	"The Fanelli Birthday Episode"	Hot Sugar	September 7, 2011
Random: Jean
13	"The What’s On My Head Episode"	Big Digits	September 14, 2011
Random: Jean; Guest: Cipha Sounds
14	"The Drawing Pictures Episode"	G. Wallace	September 21, 2011
Random: Jean; Guest: Brian Huskey
15	"The Find The Human Fish Episode"	Roebus One	September 28, 2011
Random: Jean
16	"Goodbye Random Jean"	The Handsome Men	October 5, 2011
Random: Jean
17	"New Friends and Long Lost Friends"	T.R.U.B.	October 12, 2011
18	"The Physical Fitness Episode"	The Toys and Tiny Instruments	October 19, 2011
Random: Andrew
19	"The Great American Presidential Debate"	none	October 26, 2011
Random: Andrew; Guests: Jimmy McMillan, Connor Ratliff
20	"Sibling Rivalry"	Brick+Mortar	November 2, 2011
Random: Andrew; Guests: Tom Scharpling, Ilana Glazer, Eliot Glazer, Gregg Gethard, Will Hines, Kevin Hines
21	"The Milkshake of Death"	Black Wine	November 9, 2011
Random: Andrew
22	"Random Andrew and The Hero’s Journey"	The Strange Boys	November 16, 2011
Random: Andrew
23	"Sandwich Night"	none	November 23, 2011
Random: Andrew The first semiannual Sandwich Night, a pre-Thanksgiving celebration where fans flood the TCGS studio to make and eat sandwiches of their own creation.
24	"The Greatest Rivalry in Sports"	none	November 30, 2011
Random: Andrew
25	"Papa Gethard’s Love Cauldron"	Genghis Barbie	December 7, 2011
Random: Andrew; Guest: Nicole Byer
26	"Monologues Only"	Kevin Devine	December 14, 2011
Random: Andrew
27	"One Hundred Callers"	Apple Jackzzzzz	December 21, 2011
Random: Andrew
28	"Ruin This Show"	The Cocoon Central Dance Team	January 4, 2012
Random: Andrew
29	"The Dominatrix"	The Buckwheat Groats	January 11, 2012
Random: Andrew
30	"The Night of Zero Laughs III"	none	January 18, 2012
Random: Andrew; Guests: Grizz Chapman, Bobby Moynihan, Cipha Soundz, Patrick Cassels, Anthony Atamanuik, Ken Beck, Jon Hess, Lee Kay, Dan Black, Diana Kolsky, Cathryn Mudon, Phil Jackson, Dan Hill
31	"The Blindfold Show"	Gracie	January 25, 2012
Random: Andrew
32	"Loser is the New Nerd"	Stumblebum Brass Band	February 1, 2012
Random: Andrew; Guests: James Adomian (as Jesse Ventura), Phil Jackson
33	"The Search for the New Random"	The Debutante Hour	February 8, 2012
Random: Andrew
34	"The Birth of the Third Random"	none	February 15, 2012
35	"Checking In With Alyssa"	Ted Leo	February 22, 2012
Random: Melissa; Guests: Kay Cannon, Grizz Chapman, Tina Fey (video), Jon Glaser (in writing), Phil Jackson, Zachary Levi, Joe Mande, Jack McBrayer, Bobby Moynihan, Jeff Rubin, Alyssa Stonoha
36	"How Do Girls Work?"	Night Birds	February 29, 2012
Random: Melissa; Guest: Julie Klausner
37	"The Culture Show"	The Suzan	March 7, 2012
Random: Melissa; Guest: Colt Cabana
38	"The Birth of The Hintmaster"	Mindtroll	March 21, 2012
Random: Melissa; Guest: The Hintmaster
39	"The Camera Cannon"	Cesspool	March 28, 2012
Random: Melissa; Guests: Kurt Braunohler, The Hintmaster
40	"The Wisdom of the Aged"	Crazy Pills	April 4, 2012
Random: Melissa; Guests: Peter Benjaminson, Adam Pally, The Hintmaster, Vacation Jason
41	"Math Sucks, Hintmaster Sucks"	Jason Martin	April 11, 2012
Random: Melissa; Guest: Ruby Karp
42	"The Hintmaster Show"	Bad Credit No Credit	April 18, 2012
Random: Melissa; Guests: The Hintmaster, Vacation Jason The Hintmaster takes over the show, using it to promote his sponsor White Out Athletics and to humiliate Gethard, who he has in a cage on stage.
43	"Multiple Choice Cavalcade of Fiascos"	The Toys and Tiny Instruments	April 25, 2012
Random: Melissa
44	"Foreign Language Bingo"	Big Digits	May 3, 2012
Random: Melissa
45	"We Got Nothing"	Electric Monday	May 9, 2012
Random: Melissa
46	"Robot Fights"	Hand Job Academy	May 16, 2012
Random: Melissa; Guest: Carrie-Ann Murphy
47	"Birthday Night"	Shellshag	May 23, 2012
Random: Melissa; Guests: Alyssa Stonoha, Ruby Karp
48	"The Great Gethard Look-Alike Extravaganza"	Yula & The Extended Family	May 30, 2012
Random: Melissa
49	"Farewell Melissa"	Mal Blum	June 13, 2012
Random: Melissa
50	"The One Year Anniversary Show"	The Dolchnakov Brigade	June 20, 2012
Random: Ellen
51	"The Night of Zero Laughs 2"	Miniboone	June 27, 2012
Random: Ellen; Guests: Mal Blum, Gabe Delahaye, Matt Besser, Tami Sagher, Jeff Rubin, Patrick Cassels, Dino Stamatopoulos, Lennon Parham, Scott Adsit, Kurt Braunohler, Dan St. Germain, Nore Davis, Cipha Sounds, Grizz Chapman, Connor Ratliff, Connor Ratliff's parents, Dave Hill, Carrie-Ann Murphy, Josh Mond, Antonio Campos, Anthony Atamanuik
52	"The Genuine Sadness Episode"	Xray Eyeballs	July 11, 2012
Random: Ellen Callers and panelists tell stories about sad times in their lives.
53	"The Shitty Art Show"	Supercute!	July 18, 2012
Random: Ellen; Guest: Tami Sagher
54	"The Twist Magazine August 2012 Issue"	Naked Heroes	July 25, 2012
Random: Ellen The panel does a read through of Twist Magazine.
55	"The Setup Show"	Circadian Clock	August 1, 2012
Random: Ellen
56	"Sum Yourself Up In One Sentence"	Alien Father	August 8, 2012
Random: Ellen
57	"Celebrities Come Validate Us"	Laura Stevenson & The Cans	August 15, 2012
Random: Ellen; Guest: Barry Z
58	"The Crowd Sourced Character Contest"	Animal Tropical	August 22, 2012
Random: Ellen; Guests: Bobby Moynihan, Jesse Lee, Jen Engel, Vacation Jason, Cathryn Mudon, Josh Sharp, Matt Dennie, Emma Noble, Pat Baer, Diana Kolsky, Joe Cozzo, Ken Beck, Langan Kingsley, Brandon Gulya, Dan Black
59	"Happy Murf Day"	The Shondes	August 29, 2012
Random: Ellen; Guests: Brandon Gulya, James Chupka, Dan Black, Connor Ratliff
60	"Truth or Dare"	The Shivering Brigade	September 5, 2012
Random: Ellen; Guest: Don Fanelli (video)
61	"The Ultimate Public Access Party"	Kitty Pryde	September 12, 2012
Random: Ellen; Guests: Andrew W.K., Diana Kolsky, Johnny McNulty
62	"Smash Cut to The Future"	Science Police	September 19, 2012
Random: Ellen
63	"Smash Cut to The Past"	The So So Glos	September 26, 2012
Random: Ellen
64	"A Book Shall be Written"	Disposable Rocket Band	October 3, 2012
Random: Ellen; Guests: R. L. Stine, Dave Hill, DC Pierson
65	"The Blindfold Show II"	Ikebe Shakedown	October 10, 2012
66	"The Softer Side of Shannon O’Neill"	The Stumblebum Brass Band	October 17, 2012
Random: Manesha (no-show); Guest: Riley Soloner
67	"The Cans Film Festival 2012"	none	October 24, 2012
Random: Monesha (no-show)
68	"The Beef Off"	Moisture	November 14, 2012
Random: Orlando (sit-in)
69	"Sandwich Night 2012: 2 Sandwich 2 Night"	none	November 21, 2012
Random: Manaesha (no-show)
70	"Fan Fiction Theatre"	Craig Finn	November 28, 2012
Random: Mineesha (no-show); Guests: Bobby Moynihan, Anthony Atamanuik, Connor Ratliff, Vacation Jason
71	"First Night in Harlem"	Franz Nicolay	December 12, 2012
Random: Manisha (no-show)
72	"Panic Attacks and Technical Disasters"	Claire's Diary	December 19, 2012
Random: Menesha (no-show)
73	"Hyperresolutions"	Kitty Pryde and Lakutis	January 2, 2013
Random: Momisha (no-show)
74	"Keeper and Company"	Pearl and the Beard	January 9, 2013
Random: Mamesha (no-show)
75	"Loser Is Still The New Nerd"	Screaming Females	January 16, 2013
Random: Muh-nisha (no-show); Guest: James Adomian (as Jesse Ventura)
76	"Angels and Devils"	The Little Seizures	January 23, 2013
Random: Moneesha (no-show)
77	"Belly Burrito"	Geoff Rickly	January 30, 2013
Random: Monoesha (no-show)
78	"Farewell Manesha"	Leda	February 6, 2013
Random: Monaesha (no-show)
79	"Race To The Top"	Anamanaguchi	February 13, 2013
Random: Maxine
80	"Ambidextrous?"	Kelly Montoya	February 20, 2013
Random: Maxine
81	"February Beach Party"	The Ape Hangers	February 27, 2013
Random: Maxine; Guest: Vacation Jason
82	"When The Cat's Away, The Ratz Will Play"	Communication Corporation	March 6, 2013
Random: Maxine
83	"First Times"	Aleister X	March 20, 2013
Random: Maxine; Guest: Aidy Bryant
84	"Someone Will Die"	Plow United	March 27, 2013
Random: Maxine
85	"The Royal Rumble Of Twister"	Free Energy	April 3, 2013
Random: Maxine; Guest: Colt Cabana
86	"Beyoncé!"	Clinical Trials	April 10, 2013
Random: Maxine; Guests: Alyssa Stonoha, Connor Ratliff
87	"Let's Get Real"	Real Estate	April 17, 2013
Random: Maxine
88	"What's in Hot Dog's Mouth?"	Cymbals Eat Guitars	April 24, 2013
Random: Maxine
89	"Conventional Real Late Night Characters"	Heliotropes	May 1, 2013
Random: Maxine
90	"Who Needs A Haircut!?"	Wojcik	May 8, 2013
Random: Maxine; Guest: Zach Galifianakis
91	"We Will Predict Your Future"	Zs	May 15, 2013
Random: Maxine; Guest: Amy Poehler
92	"Sum Yourself Up in a Dance Move"	Flown	May 22, 2013
Random: Maxine; Guest: Griffin Newman
93	"What's The Worst Thing You Can Make Us Say"	Thee Creeps	May 29, 2013
Random: Maxine
94	"Conspiracy Theory Gary Show"	A Bunch of Dead People	June 5, 2013
Random: Maxine
95	"The Hour Long Song"	studio audience	June 12, 2013
96	"The Crowd Sourced Character Contest 2"	Cudzoo & The Faggettes	June 19, 2013
The second parade of characters created from audience suggestions.
97	"True Or False"	Fucked Up	June 26, 2013
Random: Messenger Bag; Guests: Stellan from Sweden, Joe Pera, Conner O'Malley, Riley Soloner, Connor Ratliff
98	"Leaked Emails"	LES VINYL	July 3, 2013
Random: Messenger Bag; Guest: Jay Miller
99	"Lookin' At Dicks In The Dark: A New Low"	none	July 10, 2013
Random: Messenger Bag
100	"Hundo"	Mikey Erg	July 17, 2013
Random: Messenger Bag; Guests: Riley Soloner, Phil Jackson
101	"Glory Hole Kissing Booth"	Mannequin Pussy	July 31, 2013
Random: Messenger Bag; Guests: Vanessa Bayer, Aidy Bryant
102	"Destroy-A-Toy"	Mike Doughty	August 7, 2013
Random: Messenger Bag; Guest: Bobby Moynihan
103	"Turtle Birthday"	Butterscotch Stanley	August 14, 2013
Random: Messenger Bag
104	"Space Battle"	Night Birds	August 21, 2013
Random: Messenger Bag; Guest: Rich Sommer
105	"Caller Critiques"	Jake Fogelnest	August 28, 2013
Random: Messenger Bag
106	"The Villain's Journey"	The Front Bottoms	September 4, 2013
Random: Messenger Bag
107	"We Got Nothing 2"	Quitzow	September 11, 2013
Random: Messenger Bag
108	"The Mole"	Princess Superstar	September 18, 2013
Random: Messenger Bag; Guest: Jesse Lee
109	"The Beef Off 2"	Tiny Empires	September 25, 2013
Random: Messenger Bag
110	"Olympic Training"	Evil Sword	October 2, 2013
Random: Messenger Bag
111	"We Watch You"	Pink And Blue	October 9, 2013
Random: Messenger Bag; Guest: Myq Kaplan
112	"TCGS Half Hour + Saddle-Bee Neigh-t Hive"	The Unlovables	October 16, 2013
Random: Messenger Bag; Guest: Griffin Newman
113	"Mike At The Library"	The World/Inferno Friendship Society	October 23, 2013
Random: Messenger Bag
114	"Rid Us Of This Cursed Doll"	Ghost & Goblin	October 30, 2013
Random: Messenger Bag
115	"Open For Delivery"	Thundera	November 6, 2013
Random: Messenger Bag
116	"Place Your Bets"	Ceramic Dog	November 13, 2013
Random: Messenger Bag
117	"A Big Announcement"	.357 Lover	November 20, 2013
Random: Messenger Bag
118	"Sandwich Night Br3advolution"	none	November 27, 2013
Random: Messenger Bag
119	"Scare the Shit Out of Bethany"	Crazy & The Brains	December 4, 2013
Random: Messenger Bag
120	"The Cream Wedding"	Intern Paige Finch	December 11, 2013
Random: Messenger Bag
121	"The Human Fish Gets Waxed"	Wheatus	April 2, 2014
Random: Sandy; Guest: Sal Vulcano
122	"Tell Us Something You've Never Told Anyone"	Slothrust	April 9, 2014
Random: Sandy; Guest: Joe Mande
123	"J.D.'s Nightmare"	Field Mouse	April 16, 2014
Random: Sandy (no-show)
124	"I'm Nervous All The Time"	Jeff Rosenstock	April 23, 2014
Random: Sandy
125	"Say It To My Face"	Terror Pigeon Dance Revolt	April 30, 2014
Random: Sandy (no-show)
126	"Don Fanelli Builds A Human Size Bird House"	The Fantastic Plastics	May 7, 2014
Random: Sandy (no-show)
127	"Paintin' Faces With Diana Kolsky"	Teen Girl Scientist Monthly	May 14, 2014
Random: Sandy (no-show)
128	"Spanish Calls Only"	Emilyn Brodsky	May 21, 2014
Random: Sandy (no-show)
129	"How Would You Fight Me?"	Lemuria	May 28, 2014
Random: Sandy (no-show)
130	"Straight-Up Phone Sex"	Radical Dads	June 4, 2014
Random: Sandy (no-show); Guests: Hannibal Buress, Conner O'Malley
131	"Talkin' Teenz"	Modern Hut	June 11, 2014
Random: Sandy (no-show)
132	"Juan In A Million"	Chamber Band	June 18, 2014
Random: Sandy (no-show)
133	"The Night of Zero Laughs V"	LOW FAT GETTING HIGH	June 25, 2014
Random: Sandy (no-show); Guests: Wyatt Cenac, Tami Sagher, Jordan Klepper, Mike O'Brien, Griffin Newman, Will Hines, Alyssa Stonoha, Grizz Chapman, Joe Mackie, Connor Ratliff
134	"The First Call Show"	Chumped	July 2, 2014
Random: Sandy (no-show)
135	"We Aren't Done Talking About Wrestling Yet"	Bad Behavior	July 9, 2014
Random: Sandy (no-show); Guest: Eddie Kingston
136	"Talk About Whatever You Want (But We Recommend Professional Wrestling)"	Bryan and the Haggards	July 16, 2014
Guest: Tito Santana, Brooks Wheelan
137	"Why Did You Stop Watching The Chris Gethard Show?"	none	July 23, 2014
The team behind the show sits down to discuss where it's been and where it's going.
138	"ShoutOutTV Presents The Booty Shake Hour with Bo Montez"	Chris Farren	July 30, 2014
The TCGS time slot is occupied by an hour long dance party hosted by "booty enthusiast" Bo Montez.
139	"I Can Do Bad All By Myself"	Mal Blum	August 6, 2014
The entire panel and crew of the show is absent, leaving Gethard to operate the cameras, take calls and act as the house band by himself.
140	"18th Century American Gladiators"	Open Mike Eagle	August 13, 2014
141	"Should We Keep Doing This Show?"	Black Wine	August 20, 2014

=== Season 2 (2014) ===
No. overall	No. in season	Title	Musical guest	Original release date
142	1	"Fill the Bowl"	Jeff Rosenstock	September 24, 2014
143	2	"Flying Knives and Animal Heads with Mike Birbiglia & Marcus Monroe"	Glockabelle	October 1, 2014
144	3	"Down to Fun"	Panglossian Prophets of Doom	October 8, 2014
The panel attempts to set up callers on dates with each other.
145	4	"200 Kazoos and #SmithGate"	Tigers and Monkeys	October 22, 2014
Gethard buys kazoos for everyone in the audience, and engages in discussion with an alleged MNN producer who hates The Chris Gethard Show.
146	5	"Who's Your Favorite Serial Killer? Have You Taken Human Life?"	Ghost and Goblin	October 29, 2014
The panel discusses and takes calls about serial killers and other murders.
147	6	"Birds and Bees and Eventually Eggs"	Cutters	November 5, 2014
148	7	"Those Are Words My Mouth Just Said"	Shilpa Ray	November 12, 2014
149	8	"Sandwich Night: Toast Protocol"	none	November 26, 2014
150	9	"All Hands On The Bad One"	Priests	December 3, 2014
151	10	"Web CG"	Frank Portman	December 10, 2014
152	11	"The Crowd Sourced Character Contest 3"	Little Waist	December 17, 2014
Random: Frodo

=== Season 3 (2015) ===
No. overall	No. in season	Title	Musical guest	Original release date
153	1	"Fetish Party"	Mike Pace and the Child Actors	January 14, 2015
Random: Frodo
154	2	"Meet The Parents"	Microwave Death	January 21, 2015
Random: Frodo
155	3	"When Next You See Us We Will Be Standing Atop the Rubble..." (Note: The full name of this episode is "When Next You See Us We Will Be Standing Atop the Rubble Of The Entertainment Industry, Victorious Conquerers In A Strange Land That’s Never Welcomed Us. We Are The Outsiders. We Are The Renegades. We Are The Surrogates For The Silent Masses Who Are Not Willing To Be Treated As A Number, Who Are Smart Enough To Know That Their Value Is Rooted In More Than What Demographic Some White Male In A Suit Categorizes Them In. In April We Take To New Airwaves To Shout Furiously On Behalf Of The Sad, Creative, Sexually Confused, Generally Forgotten Kids Who Have Long Found It Unpleasant To Shout For Themselves. We Are A Voice For The Voiceless. We Take To The Grid So That We May Speak On Behalf Of Those Who Opt To Live Off Of It. We Are The Nervous System, And Our Viewers Are The Heart And The Brain. We Aim To Obey The Commands Of The Meekest Voices Amongst The Din. We Are Selling Out, But We Will Never Back Down. We Thank The Powers That Be For Our Seat At The Table But We Refuse To Ever Be Cool And We Insist On Making A Mess. Some People Get Invited In The Front Door. Some People Sneak Through The Back Door. We Are Sleeping In A Tent In The Vacant Lot Next Door And Throwing Eggs At The Metaphorical House. This Is Not Goodbye, It’s Only See Ya Later. This Is Not The End, It Is The Beginning. MNN Was Where The Forces Gathered, And Now The Army Marches. And You, The Viewers Who Have Supported Us, Are The Generals In That Army, The Admirals On The Ships, You Tell Us When It’s Time To Push The Button And Go Nuclear On The Whole Venture. The Mainstream Entertainment Industry Murdered Andy Kaufman And It Is The Duty Of This Show To Get Revenge On His Behalf.")	The Weaks	January 28, 2015
Random: Frodo

== Fusion (2015–16) ==
=== Season 1 (2015) ===
No. overall	No. in season	Title	Special guest(s)	Video guest(s)	Musical guest	Original release date
156	1	"Show Us The Weirdest Thing About Your Body"	Ilana Glazer and Abbi Jacobson	none	The Front Bottoms	May 28, 2015
Viewers and audience members display and discuss the weirdest parts of their body.
157	2	"Video Games Killed The TV Star"	Wyatt Cenac	none	Ikebe Shakedown	June 4, 2015
TCGS mounts a human recreation of video game Duck Hunt, and discusses video gaming and addiction.
158	3	"We'll Sleep When We're Canceled"	Seth Meyers	none	Screaming Females	June 11, 2015
The cast of TCGS perform the show after having stayed awake for 36 hours, while joined by a well-rested Seth Meyers.
159	4	"Fear: A Comedy Show"	Aidy Bryant	none	Cakes da Killa	June 18, 2015
TCGS explores fear, and Chris cedes control of the show to his brother, Gregg.
160	5	"Til Geth Do Us Part"	Will Ferrell	none	Mal Blum	June 25, 2015
Chris, an ordained minister, marries three couples, with Will Ferrell as best man.
161	6	"You Okay?"	Ellie Kemper	none	War on Women	July 2, 2015
Chris and Ellie Kemper ask callers if they are okay.
162	7	"The Gethminster Dog Show"	Jason Sudeikis	Bill Hader	Jeff Rosenstock	July 23, 2015
A show for dogs, featuring calls from dogs and an audience almost entirely composed of dogs.
163	8	"Whatever Happens, Happens!"	Nick Kroll	Judd Apatow	Open Mike Eagle	July 30, 2015
A completely unplanned show, including unscreened calls and new characters improvised by Nick Kroll.
164	9	"Five Word Life Story"	Kumail Nanjiani	Amy Poehler	Downtown Boys	August 6, 2015
Viewers sum up their life stories in five words.
165	10	"Bring It Home"	Ira Glass	none	Shellshag	August 13, 2015
The TCGS cast and crew take the audience on a bus trip to Asbury Park in Chris' home state of New Jersey. Season finale.

=== Season 2 (2016) ===
No. overall	No. in season	Title	Special guest(s)	Musical guest	Original release date
166	1	"Quit Your Job"	Colin Quinn	Kool Keith	March 30, 2016
Callers are encouraged to quit their jobs.
167	2	"The Diddy Episode"	Sean "Diddy" Combs	Idgy Dean	April 6, 2016
TCGS gives callers advice on romance and/or interior design, and an unexpected guest replaces a no-show Pete Holmes.
168	3	"Slam Dunks, Slam Poetry"	John Hodgman, John Starks	PitchBlak Brass Band	April 13, 2016
The cast dunks basketballs while callers recite poems.
169	4	"Under the Sea Gender Fluid Poly Prom"	Lena Dunham	They Might Be Giants	April 20, 2016
TCGS hosts a prom.
170	5	"Fuck Censorship"	Pete Holmes	M.A.K.U. Soundsystem	April 27, 2016
TCGS tests the limits of censorship.
171	6	"The Truth Might Be Out There"	Bobby Moynihan, Anthony Atamanuik (as Donald Trump)	Zulu P	May 4, 2016
TCGS discusses conspiracies. Video guest: Tony Hale
172	7	"A Nice Family Dinner"	Jerrod Carmichael	PWR BTTM	May 11, 2016
TCGS tries to host a civil family dinner. Video guest: Samantha Bee
173	8	"Tragedy Plus Time"	Maria Bamford	The Ergs!	May 18, 2016
Chris and Maria Bamford discuss mental health.
174	9	"One Man's Trash"	Paul Scheer and Jason Mantzoukas	Champagne Jerry	May 25, 2016
Viewers call in to guess what's in the TCGS dumpster.
175	10	"Fight For the Fish"	Jon Hamm, Colt Cabana, Sean Waltman, Rhino	Beach Slang	June 1, 2016
Chris faces off against Vacation Jason in a wrestling match to rescue a kidnapped Human Fish. Season finale.

== truTV (2017–18) ==
No. overall	No. in season	Title	Special guest(s)	Musical guest	Original release date	US viewers (millions)
176	1	"Too Many Piñatas"	The cast of Impractical Jokers	Young Paris	August 3, 2017	0.355
Viewers call in to pick a piñata for the Impractical Jokers to destroy live on air and give away what's inside. Joe Gatto was unable to make it to the show due to the birth of his son.
177	2	"Innocuous Opinions, Dire Consequences"	John Mulaney	Atom and His Package	August 10, 2017	0.248
Chris and Shannon discuss their opinions on innocuous topics. Viewers call in to decide who is "correct"; the "incorrect" cast member faces punishment.
178	3	"The Official TCGS Dum-Dum"	Julie Klausner & Jordan Klepper	Cayetana	August 17, 2017	0.272
Viewers are encouraged to call in to share their dumb stories. Whoever has the dumbest story, decided in a pro-wrestling-championship-style fashion, becomes the official TCGS Dum-Dum. The winner, comedian James Bradford, became the show's official mascot and had his face printed on official merch.
179	4	"Oops, We Got a Bunch of Exercise Equipment"	Adam Pally	Mannequin Pussy	August 24, 2017	0.273
The TCGS gang and guest Adam Pally are getting on cardio machines and pushing themselves to their absolute physical limits.
180	5	"Meth and Geth Talk About Death"	Method Man	Worriers	August 31, 2017	0.275
Skype users and callers are asked what would they engrave on their tombstones while Shannon posing as the Grim Reaper predicts how they will die, and Method Man decides what will be engraved on Chris's tombstone.
181	6	"Technology Will Destroy Us All"	John Oliver & Rob Huebel	Rebelmatic	September 14, 2017	0.202
John Oliver joins the show to help answer one of the great moral quandaries, is technology good or evil? Plus, viewers take control of the show through free roaming robots and a cannon that's controlled online.
182	7	"Get It Off Your Chest"	Wanda Sykes	RVIVR	September 21, 2017	0.179
Callers were asked to share their secrets, regrets, or unpopular opinions that they were willing to share on tv.
183	8	"What Could Have Been"	Timothy Simons & Okieriete Onaodowan	Ted Leo	September 28, 2017	0.185
Callers are asked to share moments in their life that were "fork in the road" moments, asking what could have been. Meanwhile, an alternate reality is discussed and shown in a skit where Gethard was cast on Veep instead of Simons.
184	9	"Everything Is Terrifying"	Michael Ian Black	Bash & Pop	October 5, 2017	N/A
185	10	"Take A Chance"	Tig Notaro & Patton Oswalt	Deerhoof	October 12, 2017	0.183
186	11	"The Mating Game"	Ellie Kemper	Nitty Scott	October 19, 2017	0.132
The entire studio audience is made up of singles and are matched up for first dates. Four couples are given special dates within the confines of the studio.
187	12	"Let's Get Scared"	Gillian Jacobs	PUP	October 26, 2017	0.214
Video calls all come from people visiting haunted or scary locations.
188	13	"Them's Fighting Words"	Rob Corddry	Less Than Jake	November 2, 2017	0.194
Callers attempt to get Gethard and Corddry into saying secret words, which trigger attacks from two skilled martial artists.
189	14	"Failure"	Seth Meyers	Red Baraat	November 9, 2017	0.149
190	15	"Oops, We Gambled Away The Budget"	Hannibal Buress & Talib Kweli	Japanese Breakfast	November 16, 2017	0.174
Callers tell stories about their worst financial decision to chastise Gethard and Murph for gambling away the budget for the show's finale in Atlantic City.
191	16	"Screw It. Show Us Your Pets"	Paul Scheer & Jason Mantzoukas	The Skins	November 30, 2017	0.140
Gethard abandons guests Paul Scheer and Jason Mantzoukas in the studio and attempts to draw away the studio audience with a petting zoo.
192	17	"We're Giving Away Cars!"	Abbi Jacobson	Charly Bliss	March 20, 2018	0.102
193	18	"Pandora's Call-In Topics"	Cipha Sounds	Metz	March 27, 2018	N/A
194	19	"Will Ferrell Saves This Show"	Will Ferrell	Chris Farren	April 3, 2018	0.133
195	20	"Escape the Cage"	Matt Walsh	The Go! Team	April 10, 2018	0.110
Gethard is trapped in a massive cage in the studio. Callers must help guest Matt Walsh solve clues or 100 pounds of human hair will drop on him.
196	21	"Honesty vs. Idiocy"	Aubrey Plaza	Martha	April 17, 2018	N/A
Gethard and Shannon provide serious and silly call in topics respectively.
197	22	"Survive the Apocalypse"	Hasan Minhaj	Ezra Furman	April 24, 2018	0.153
198	23	"Pot Brownie Roulette"	Sasheer Zamata & Nicole Byer	Ladama	May 8, 2018	0.179
199	24	"Call It Forward"	none	Great Wight	May 15, 2018	0.088
Viewers are asked to answer the question given to them by the previous caller, and then, they are supposed to ask a question for the next caller. This episode had no official guest, but guest appearances were made by John Ross Bowie, Blake Griffin, Lennon Parham, Jake Johnson, Joanna Angel, and Dylan "Swoggle" Postl. Vacation Jason acts as a panelist with Shannon and Chris.
200	25	"New York vs. The World"	Michael Beasley	Bush Tetras	May 22, 2018	0.088
201	26	"Stop Apologizing For Your Dream"	Paul Rudd	none	May 29, 2018	0.149

== Specials ==
No.	Title	Original release date
1	"Holiday Special: The Spirit of Gethard"	December 28, 2011
2	"FAQ Special"	March 14, 2012
3	"The Asbury Spectacular"	June 6, 2012
4	"The Hallowcane Squeezetacular"	October 31, 2012
5	"Election Special: 12 Hours of Election Coverage"	November 6, 2012
6	"Old Enough To Be President: Connor Ratliff's 35-Year Journey To The White House"	November 9, 2012
7	"The Spirit of Gethard 2: Hintmaster Hologram Holiday Special"	December 26, 2012
8	"Murf Vs. Gimghoul: Hour-Long Scumbum Exposing Special"	December 18, 2013
9	"Spirit of Gethard 3: Christmas Juice"	December 25, 2013
10	"Truth or Myth with Smith: Episode 1"	November 19, 2014
Musical guest: Smitty and the Thrill Ride
11	"Loser Party at Comic-Con"	July 11, 2015
An hour-long special episode celebrating geeks and loserdom, recorded at San Diego Comic-Con. Special Guest(s): Paul F. Tompkins, Sami Zayn, Jonah Ray, Sal Vulcano; Video Guest(s): Bobby Moynihan, Chris Parnell Musical Guest: The Underground Railroad to Candyland
12	"Sandwich Night 5: Assignment Salami Beach"	November 25, 2015
13	"The Spirit of Ratliff"	December 21, 2015
14	"12 Hour 2016 Election Special"	November 8, 2016
15	"The Special Presents: Sandwich Night and The Half Blood Prince"	November 23, 2016
16	"Sandwich Night 7: Sandwich Night and the Dragon of Breadapest"	November 29, 2017
17	"Sandwich Night 8: Dog Bites Manwich"	November 28, 2018
18	"The Spirit of Gethard 4"	December 23, 2018
19	"Sandwich Night 9: Hobbs & Slaw"	December 5, 2019
20	"Planet Scum Presents: The 10th Annual Sandwich Night"	December 4, 2020
