= Robby Hoffman =

Canadian and American actress (born 1989)

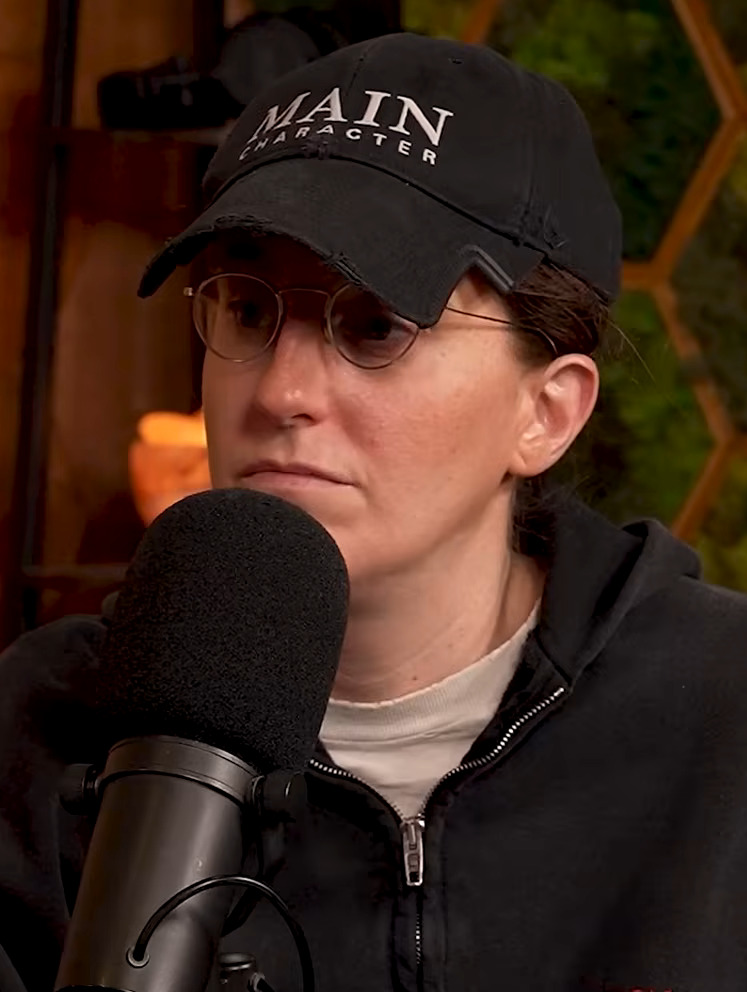
- Hoffman in March 2026
- Born: Rivkah Sarah Hoffman; December 2, 1989 (age 36); New York City, U.S.
- Citizenship: United States; Canada
- Education: McGill University (BCom)
- Occupations: Actress; comedian; writer; talk show host
- Years active: 2015–present
- Spouse: Gabby Windey (m. 2025)

Rivkah Sarah "Robby" Hoffman (born December 2, 1989) is a Canadian and American actress and comedian. Born in Brooklyn and raised in Montreal, she began her career as a writer and is known for her work on The Chris Gethard Show, Baroness Von Sketch Show, Workin' Moms, and Odd Squad, the latter of which won an Emmy Award for Outstanding Writing for a Children's, Preschool Children's, Family Viewing in 2019. Hoffman released her first stand-up special, I'm Nervous, in 2019. She was named one of Comedy Central's Up Next comedians in 2018, appeared on Conan O'Brien's Comics to Watch list, as well as on Vulture's The Comedians You Should and Will Know in 2020.

Hoffman was nominated in 2025 for a Primetime Emmy Award for Outstanding Guest Actress in a Comedy Series for her recurring role as Randi in the HBO Max comedy-drama Hacks. The New York Times called her "a breakout star" and a "fan favorite".

== Early life and education ==
Rivkah Sarah Hoffman was born on December 2, 1989, in the Brooklyn borough of New York City. The seventh of ten siblings, she grew up in an impoverished Hasidic Jewish family that lived in a small apartment in Brooklyn's Crown Heights neighborhood. Hoffman jokingly says of her parents, who formerly practiced Reform Judaism and later began to practice Hasidic Judaism: "They're two people who joined a Hasidic cult and had ten kids, and I'm the product of it." Her mother later converted to Christianity.

During her early childhood, Hoffman's parents divorced; she and her siblings were subsequently raised by their single mother in her native Montreal, Canada. Hoffman has said her mother struggled financially to support their family, and that she lived in poverty.

After attending the private high school Bialik Secondary School, Hoffman enrolled at McGill University, where she studied accounting and communications; after graduation, she enrolled in the graduate CPA program at McGill, only to quit a few hours into her first day of the program to pursue a career in comedy.

== Career ==
Hoffman began her writing career and was soon garnering recognition for her work, while writing and performing stand-up comedy. In 2018, she was a headlining act for the New York Comedy Festival. In 2019, she recorded her first one-hour comedy special I'm Nervous at the Just For Laughs comedy festival in Toronto for Crave TV.

Hoffman's first television writing job was for the PBS series Odd Squad; she won a 2019 Daytime Emmy Award for her work on the series. Hoffman was a staff writer for Workin' Moms and Baroness Von Sketch Show. She was a staff writer on The Chris Gethard Show; after its cancellation, Hoffman starred in episodes of The Chris Gethard Show with Robby Hoffman on both MNN and Chris Gethard Presents, as well as taking the show live to the Montreal Just For Laughs festival. She hosted Robby Hoffman Consulting Group (formerly Dykevice), a live call-in advice show on Gethard's comedy network Planet Scum Live.

In 2021, it was announced that Rivkah, an autobiographical comedy series created by and starring Hoffman, is in development with Showtime and A24.

She received a Juno Award nomination for Comedy Album of the Year at the Juno Awards of 2026, for her comedy album I'm Nervous. Hoffman recorded public service announcements for MTA New York City Transit's subway system in August 2026.

== Personal life ==
Hoffman is a lesbian. According to her, her family was supportive when she came out, and she is close to them.

In August 2023, Hoffman announced her relationship with The Bachelorette alumna Gabby Windey. Hoffman and Windey were married in January 2025.

Hoffman chose to have both her breasts removed and has talked about it openly. While it is common for mastectomy to be performed as an effective treatment for breast cancer or gender dysphoria, she explains that the surgery was elective. Hoffman has described not having breasts as nice as well as comfortable.

== Filmography ==
=== Television ===
Year	Title	Role	Notes
2015–2018	Odd Squad	Writer	Multiple episodes; 2019 Emmy Award winner
2017	Dino Dana	Writer	Episode: "Dino Matchmaker: Lost and Sound"
2017–2018	The Chris Gethard Show	Writer	Multiple episodes
2018	Workin' Moms	Writer	13 episodes
2018	Baroness Von Sketch Show	Story editor	10 episodes
2019	I'm Nervous	Herself	Stand-up comedy special
2019	Sherwood	Writer	2 episodes
2019	Mind Fudge	Writer	Season 2
2019	Chris Gethard Presents	Host	Episode: "The Chris Gethard Show with Robby Hoffman"
2020–2021	Robby Hoffman Consulting Group	Host	Weekly advice show, formerly known as Dykevic
2023	History of the World, Part II	Natalia	Episode: "III"
2024	After Midnight	Herself	Season 2, Episode 46
2025	Dying for Sex	G	Episode: "Topping is a Sacred Skill"
2025–present	Hacks	Randi	Recurring role, 8 episodes (Seasons 4-5)
2025	Kiff	Jackie Pennidötter	Voice, 2 episodes
2025	Wake Up	Herself	Stand-up Comedy Special
2026–present	Rooster	Mo	Recurring role, 8 episodes

== Awards and nominations ==
Year	Award	Nominated work	Result
Daytime Emmy Awards
2017	Outstanding Writing for a Children's Series	Odd Squad	Nominated
2018	Outstanding Writing for a Children's Series	Odd Squad	Nominated
2019	Outstanding Writing for a Children's Series	Odd Squad	Won
2019	Outstanding Writing for a Children's Series	Odd Squad: World Turned Odd	Nominated
Primetime Emmy Awards
2025	Outstanding Guest Actress in a Comedy Series	Hacks	Nominated
