= Dead Eyes =

Non-fiction podcast

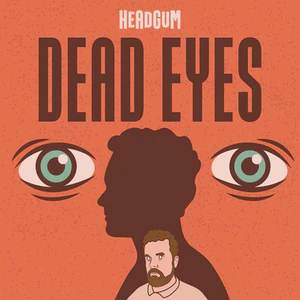
- Genre: Personal; Non-fiction; Investigation
- Format: Interview; Monologue; Storytelling

Creative team
- Created by: Connor Ratliff

Cast and voices
- Hosted by: Connor Ratliff

Music
- Ending theme: Aimee Mann

Production
- Production: Mike Comite; Harry Nelson; Jordan Allyn; Jared O'Connell
- Length: 35-90 minutes

Publication
- No. of episodes: 31 (plus bonus episode)
- Original release: January 23, 2020 – April 27, 2023
- Provider: Headgum

Reception
- Ratings: 4.3076923076923075/5, 4.42/5

Related
- Website: headgum.com/dead-eyes

Dead Eyes is a serialized personal non-fiction investigative podcast series created by actor and comedian Connor Ratliff. In 2000, Ratliff was cast in the role of Private John Zielinski on the HBO television series Band of Brothers and was set to begin filming when he was subsequently fired, allegedly because series co-creator Tom Hanks believed Ratliff had "dead eyes". In 2020, Ratliff set out to "solve the very stupid mystery" of why he was fired, and to more generally explore the concept of rejection in the entertainment industry. The podcast gained significant media attention in March 2022 when, for its season 3 finale, Ratliff finally interviewed Hanks.

== History ==
=== Background ===
Connor Ratliff grew up in Missouri, and after high school attended the Liverpool Institute of Performing Arts in Liverpool, UK. After graduating, he stayed in London pursuing a career in acting, when he auditioned for and landed the role of Private John Zielinski in the HBO World War II epic, Band of Brothers. Upon being cast in the role, Ratliff said, "I told everyone; this was the greatest thing that had ever happened to anybody... I really felt like this would be the thing that would jump-start my acting career."

The day before Ratliff was supposed to begin filming, he was notified by his agent's assistant that Tom Hanks, who would be directing the episode, was having second thoughts; Hanks had looked at his audition tape and felt Ratliff had "dead eyes". Ratliff was asked to go immediately to the production offices at Hatfield Aerodrome, where the series was being filmed, to re-audition for the part in front of Hanks.

After reading in-person for Hanks, Ratliff was told that they had decided to recast the role, leading Ratliff to think: "I'm never going to forget this. I'm going to be constantly reminded of this experience. A lot of bad experiences in life, you can get away from. But when an aspect of that experience is so ingrained in the popular culture, that was when I realized this thing I thought was going to be so great was now a huge bummer for me."

=== Conception and development ===
After being rejected by Hanks, Ratliff stated "the experience of being hired and fired so abruptly left him broken." Further setbacks solidified his discouragement in his acting career: an indie film he wrote and acted in was supposed to be screened the South by Southwest festival shortly after September 11, 2001; he briefly moved to Oregon, where he was rejected by a local Shakespeare festival while working at a friend's day care center; and then, after moving to New York, he attempted to put on his own plays that did not gain an audience. "Whatever contacts and career momentum I'd made in England simply didn't translate."

"In addition to career failure, at the age of 30, I had sort of failed in every box you could check. I don’t have any prospects, I don’t have a career, I don’t have any of the things that any of my friends had. I was working at a bookstore and living in an apartment that was difficult to afford month to month. I didn’t have anywhere to go. I didn’t know what to do" stated Ratliff.

In New York, he was encouraged to take improvisational comedy classes at the Upright Citizens Brigade Theatre, where he began "advancing rapidly through the UCB hierarchy until Chris Gethard invited him to join his troupe, the Stepfathers." For years, Ratliff had been "too ashamed to even tell the Hanks story", but at the UCB Theatre he "realized it was a good ice-breaker, in part because every actor has experienced professional rejection and disappointment." He started to explore the idea of turning his experiences into a podcast, "applying the investigative format of a show like Serial to something incredibly minor and low stakes." He began by enlisting friends, such as Jon Hamm, D'Arcy Carden, Adam Conover, Bobby Moynihan, and Zach Woods, to tell and expand upon the Hanks story as well as share their own experiences with rejection.

Initially, Ratliff was having a hard time finding a serious distributor for the show, though he was not deterred: "I was going to continue doing this podcast no matter what, but I wanted to do it well because I knew it was a good idea. I couldn't get anyone to email me back, and then I tweeted something miserable like 'anyone know how to keep a podcast going?'". Ratliff's friend Ben Schwartz responded, asking Ratliff if he would like Schwartz to contact Jake Hurwitz and Amir Blumenfeld of the Headgum podcasting network. They were immediately receptive to Ratliff's vision, though they were wary of the potential longevity of the series. Ratliff responded, saying "I have a long list of goals I want to do, including interviewing Tom Hanks, but you have to plan your escape routes correctly; you want to know that if you can't leave the way you came in, there's another way for you to go. I'm in it for the long haul. Tom Hanks firing me is kind of like the 'Who killed Laura Palmer' of it, but the podcast is Twin Peaks."

=== Critical acclaim and "The Interview" ===
With producers Mike Comite and Harry Nelson working with Ratliff (as well as Jordan Allyn joining in season 3), Dead Eyes quickly found critical acclaim and a wide audience as Ratliff gained momentum through its first three seasons, holding interviews with Band of Brothers cast members Ron Livingston, Stephen McCole, and Adam Sims, the actor to whom the Zielinksi role was given. Many others from the entertainment industry appeared on the show up to and throughout its third season, such as Nicole Byer, Rian Johnson, Nikki Glaser, Seth Rogen, Tami Sagher, Judd Apatow, Lauren Lapkus, Damon Lindelof, and eventually, Hanks' son Colin, who appeared on the 27th episode of Dead Eyes on January 20, 2022. It was revealed that Colin and sister Elizabeth had made their father aware of Ratliff's story and podcast: upon learning of Dead Eyes, Hanks said, "I was aghast. I was — I actually got chilled. My heart rate skyrocketed and I said, I did — I did what? I did what?"

On March 2, 2022, Ratliff appeared as a guest on Late Night with Seth Meyers, where he revealed that for the season three finale on March 10, 2022, Tom Hanks would at last be interviewed on Dead Eyes, 22 years after Ratliff had been fired from Band of Brothers. The 90-minute interview between Ratliff and Hanks was hailed as a momentous achievement in podcasting, a "rare show that gives you a perfect conclusion", "surprisingly funny and empathetic", and an event Paul Scheer called "thrilling". "I was fully prepared for this to never happen, but I am thrilled that it has," said Ratliff. "I think for listeners who have been following along, it will be a very satisfying experience. And for new listeners, it's a Tom Hanks episode, so what's not to like? We want it to feel as if you're just there in the room with me and Tom. I have been a fan ever since I heard him scream the line 'I am not a fish' in Splash, and doing this podcast has only made me a bigger fan, even before he agreed to be a guest."

== Format and production ==
=== Presentation ===
Dead Eyes is presented as a serialized personal nonfiction investigational podcast. Each episode features voice over monologues and exposition from Ratliff, as well as conversational interviews between Ratliff and various guests from the entertainment industry. Post production is done by Mike Comite, with audio editing done by Comite, Harry Nelson, and associate producer Jordan Allyn in season three. Initially, episodes were recorded at Stitcher Studios in New York (with remote guests recording their audio at local traditional podcast studios, such as Jon Hamm recording his interview remotely from Earwolf Studios in Los Angeles), but when the COVID-19 pandemic and the ensuing social isolation struck, Ratliff had to make do and began recording his audio in a "blanket fort on a bedroom floor at his parents' house in Missouri."

Other times, Ratliff would record field audio on his phone from various locations, such as a busy street corner in New York City, and send the footage to Comite and Nelson. Said Comite: "There’s stuff sonically that I'm super proud of, but the stuff that's janky is almost more fun to me because initially I was like, 'We can't do it this way. It has to sound professional.' [But] you wouldn't have Zach [Woods] remarking on people walking by him on the streets in a recording studio. [That's] just the raw talent of Zach and Connor, being amazing improvisers with amazing comedic timing."

== Reception ==
Critical reception of Dead Eyes has been overwhelmingly positive, with season one making numerous "Best Podcasts of 2020" lists. Gwilym Mumford from The Guardian said that Ratliff's podcast presents "hilarious and often poignant soul-searching through the acting industry, which he now unpacks in this entertaining podcast", and for Time's "10 Best Podcasts of 2020", Elaina Dockterman writes "Dead Eyes is a funny podcast grounded in pettiness that somehow manages to be relatable rather than obnoxious... Where similar conversations devolve into 'man shouting at cloud' status, Ratliff’s knack for self-parody saves, and elevates, his show". Andrea Marks on Rolling Stone's "Best Podcasts of 2020" says: "as Ratliff gathers thread on this low-stakes mystery, the podcast turns into an insightful and sometimes juicy series about the world of acting, the trials of growing in a career, and the slipperiness of memory". For Vulture's "Best Podcasts of 2020", Nicholas Quah said: "Fascinating and excellent... Part interview show, part memoir, Dead Eyes is an innovative take on a familiar genre", and on The New Yorker's "Best Podcasts of 2020", Sarah Larson wrote: "In probing themes of opportunity, rejection, and turning failure into art, Ratliff and his guests (including Jon Hamm, Rian Johnson, and Aimee Mann) manage a level of entertainment and tonal nuance that is, frankly, surprising." For IndieWire's "Best Podcasts of 2020", Steve Greene wrote: "Ratliff takes a self-aware search for a likely impossible answer and uses it to show how hard it can be to cope with rejection."

Esquire's Emma Carey says: "Ratliff explores not just the ups and downs of show business, but the more deeply human experience of dealing with personal and professional failure. And more importantly, how we move on, learn, and grow from it", Miranda Sawyer from The Observer writes "If you like Ratliff – and he is immensely likable – you will find yourself enjoying this show." Anthony Breznican from Vanity Fair says: "The charm of Dead Eyes is its relatability. Almost everybody has a tale of rejection that they can never quite shake." and Nicolas Quah from Vulture says "The themes Dead Eyes persistently explores are rich and endless, and its tenor captures the feeling of navigating life’s greatest anxieties."
