= Connor Ratliff =

Actor and comedian

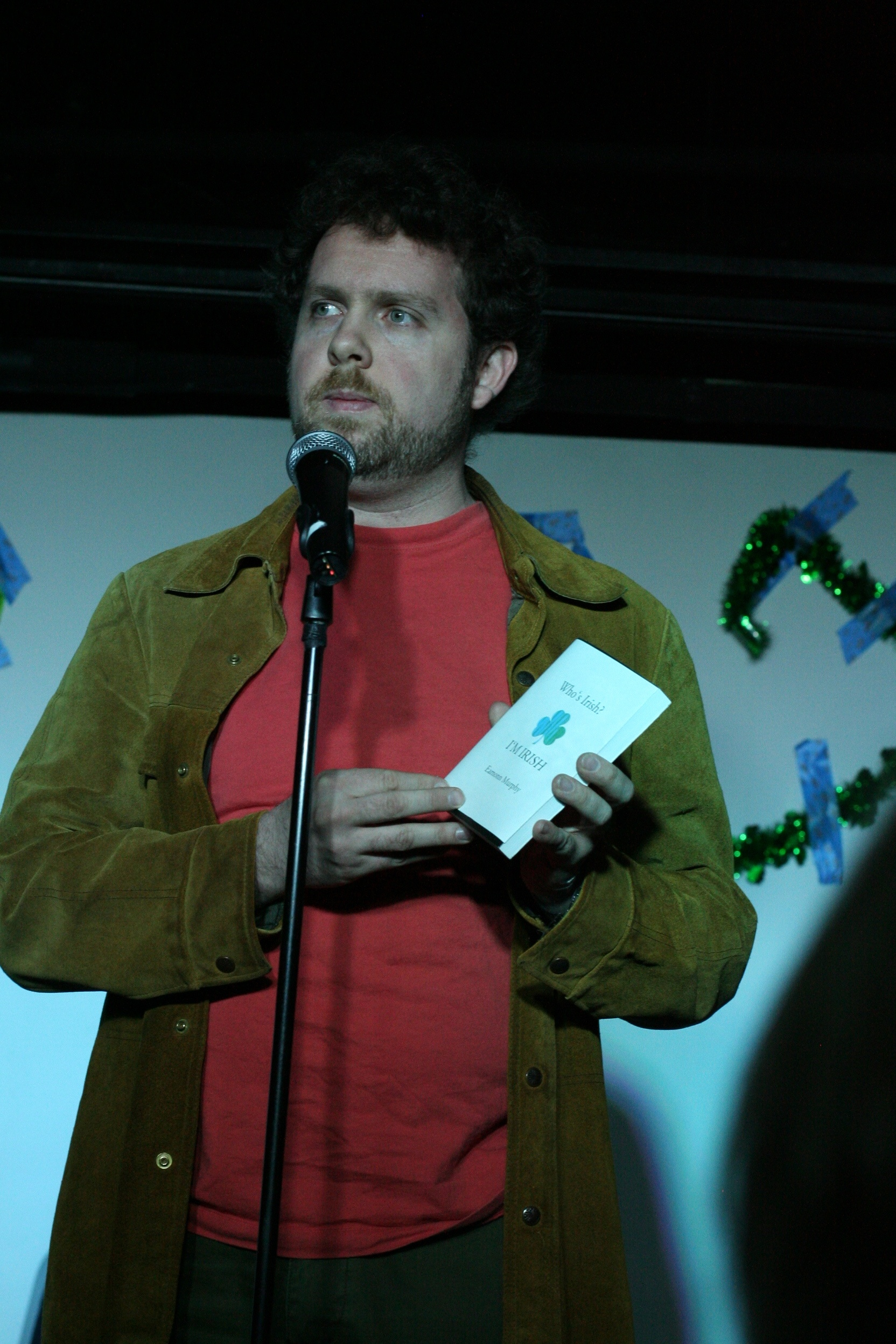
- Ratliff in 2012 photographed by Benjamin Ragheb
- Born: August 27, 1975 (age 51)
- Education: Liverpool Institute of Performing Arts
- Occupations: Actor; comedian; podcaster; television host; writer
- Years active: 1998–present

Connor Ratliff (born August 27, 1975) is an American actor and comedian. He is known for his podcast Dead Eyes, is the star and creator of the long running stage and streaming show The George Lucas Talk Show, and is associated with Upright Citizens Brigade in New York City where he is a member of the long form improv comedy troupe The Stepfathers.

== Early life ==
Ratliff grew up in Missouri, the son of Bill and Gretta Ratliff, and after high school attended the Liverpool Institute of Performing Arts in Liverpool, England. He stayed in London after graduation and worked as a reader while looking for work as an actor.

== Career ==
He began acting at The Royal Court Theatre in London, where in 1998 he appeared as one of the four lead roles in Christopher Shinn's debut play Four. In 2000, Ratliff was cast in a small role in Band of Brothers, but the role was recast before Ratliff's scene was filmed. This experience later prompted Ratliff to create the podcast Dead Eyes.

=== UCB Theatre and The Chris Gethard Show ===
After moving to New York, Ratliff began working at the UCB Theatre East, where he performed weekly Friday nights with the improv troupe The Stepfathers, and performed Sunday nights in the theatre's longest running show, ASSSSCAT 3000. He also wrote and performed on The Chris Gethard Show throughout its run as both a stage show and its many iterations on Manhattan Neighborhood Network, Fusion, and TruTV. During its run, he launched a 2012 Presidential campaign and debated Jimmy McMillan, contributed short films with award-winning artist Maelle Doliveux as The Lone Cornmeal Machine, and served as a warm up comedian and panelist.

=== The George Lucas Talk Show ===
In 2014, Connor Ratliff began hosting a live talk show where he appears as George Lucas, the creator of Star Wars, and he interviews real guests as themselves in a panel format. He is joined by sidekick Star Wars characters: initially Jar Jar Binks, played by comedian Shaun Diston, and in current shows, Watto, played by Griffin Newman. The show was performed monthly live on stage at the Upright Citizens Brigade Theatre until the COVID 19 pandemic forced the venue to close. On May 4, 2020, the show resumed as a live broadcast on Twitch, first on Planet Scum and then on Paul Scheer's channel Friendzone, and was performed remotely until the stage show format was revived in June of 2022.

In 2024 the documentary I'm "George Lucas": A Connor Ratliff Story premiered at the Slamdance Film Festival.

=== Dead Eyes ===
In 2000, Ratliff was cast in the role of Private John Zielinski in the HBO television series Band of Brothers and was set to begin filming when he was subsequently fired, allegedly because series co-creator Tom Hanks believed Ratliff had "dead eyes". In 2020, Ratliff began a podcast, Dead Eyes, that set out to "solve a very stupid mystery" of why he was fired, and to more generally explore the concept of rejection in the entertainment industry, drawing on many fellow actors to share their own experiences. The podcast gained significant media attention in March 2022 when, for its season 3 finale, Ratliff finally got Hanks to appear on the program.

=== Film, television, and other work ===
Ratliff played Mr. Rapp in Mean Girls (2024), Chester in The Marvelous Mrs. Maisel (2018–2022), and Ted in Search Party (2016–2022). He was one of the narrators for the audiobook version of Hanks' novel The Making of Another Major Motion Picture Masterpiece. Ratliff starred as Gil in the podcast In The Cards (2023) by Next Chapter Podcasts.

== Filmography ==
=== Films ===
Year	Title	Role	Notes
2001	Living in Missouri	Ryan Johnson	
2009	Mortimer Hayden Smyth Talks About Gay Marriage	Mortimer Hayden Smyth	Short film
2012	The Sale Was Yesterday		Short film
2013	The Joy of Basketballing	Basketballer	Short film
2015	HBO's Project Greenlight Finalist: Winning Entry	Ricky	Short film
2015	Survival Job	Talent Agent	Short film
2015	Chasing Banksy		
2015	Dan Miller	Dan Miller	Short film
2015	Amy Porter	Dr. Marc	Short film
2016	Don't Think Twice	Connor	
2016	Omni: Verse		
2016	Standards & Practices: A Short Film About Modern Romance	Rick	Short film
2017	Coin Heist	Mr. Garcia	
2017	The Discovery	Coroner	
2017	The Third Party	Luke Gravy	
2019	Standing Up, Falling Down	Tommy	
2022	Pinball: The Man Who Saved the Game	Jimmy	
2024	Mean Girls	Mr. Rapp	
2026	Run Amok	Mr. Watson	

=== Television ===
Year	Title	Role	Notes
2008–2014	Stone Cold Fox	Various	
2009	UCB TourCo		
2011	The George Kareman Variety Hour	(voice)	
2011–2018	The Chris Gethard Show	Himself / various	
2011–2015	CollegeHumor Originals	Various	
2012–2016	UCB Comedy Originals	Various	
2012	UCB Live!		
2014	Broad City	SHP Call Center Operator	Episode: "Working Girls"
2015	Veep		Episode: "Testimony"
2016–2022	Search Party	Ted	7 episodes
2016	Cop Show	Bad Guy	
2016	The Characters	Pathetic Man	Episode: "Lauren Lapkus"
2016	Animal Agent	Darren	
2017	The UCB Show	George Lucas	Episode: "The Phantom in Us"
2017	Adam Ruins Everything	Stranger	Episode: "Adam Ruins Halloween"
2017–2023	Last Week Tonight with John Oliver	Various	5 episodes
2018	Orange Is the New Black	Reuben Siegel	2 episodes
2018–2019	Dollar Store Therapist	Dollar Store Therapist	
2018–2022	The Marvelous Mrs. Maisel	Chester	5 episodes
2019	The Late Show with Stephen Colbert	Schlubby Guy	Episode: "Hank Azaria/Henry Louis Gates Jr./Emilia Clarke/Jeff Goldblum"
2019	Chris Gethard Presents		Episode: "Talk-A-Doodle-Doo with Connor Ratliff"
2020	Unbreakable Kimmy Schmidt	Crew Guy	Special: "Kimmy vs the Reverend"
2020–present	The George Lucas Talk Show	Retired Filmmaker George Lucas	
2021	The Blacklist	Max Frey	Episode: "The Protean (No. 36)"
2023	The Great North	Looney Louie (voice)	2 episodes
2023	The Daily Show	Satanic Priest	Episode: "Judd Apatow"
2024	Bob's Burgers	Fire Marshal (voice)	Episode: "Hope N' Mic Night"
2024	Ghosts	Scott Morgan	Episode: "A Star Is Dead"
2025	Jellystone!	Thundarr the Barbarian (voice)	Episode: "Thundarr the Barber-barian"
2025	Étoile	Morton	Episode: "The Swap"
2025	Super Duper Bunny League	Flymacher (voice)	Episode: "Frog Face"
2026	Widow's Bay	Deputy Kent	Episode: "Beach Reads"

=== Video games ===
Year	Title	Role	Notes
2026	Grand Theft Auto VI	The Local Population	
