= Run Amok (film) =

2026 drama film by NB Mager

- Directed by: NB Mager
- Written by: NB Mager
- Produced by: Julie Christeas; Frank Hall Green
- Starring: Alyssa Marvin; Patrick Wilson; Margaret Cho; Sophia Torres; Elizabeth Marvel; Molly Ringwald
- Cinematography: Shachar Langlev
- Edited by: Max Berger
- Music by: Mandy Hoffman
- Production company: Tandem Pictures
- Distributed by: Greenwich Entertainment
- Release dates: January 26, 2026 (Sundance Film Festival); 2027 (United States)
- Running time: 96 minutes
- Country: United States
- Language: English

Run Amok is a 2026 American drama film written and directed by NB Mager in her feature directorial debut. It is based on her Oscar-qualifying short film of the same name. The film stars Alyssa Marvin, Patrick Wilson, Margaret Cho, Elizabeth Marvel, and Molly Ringwald.

It premiered in the U.S. Dramatic Competition at the 2026 Sundance Film Festival on January 26, 2026.

== Premise ==
Meg, a high school student, attempts to process the aftermath of a school tragedy by staging an elaborate musical about the "one day her high school wishes it could forget." Her artistic endeavor brings her into conflict with the adults in her community, whose platitudes and empty promises obscure the genuine emotional processing needed by the students.

== Cast ==
- Alyssa Marvin as Meg
- Patrick Wilson as Mr. Shelby
- Margaret Cho as Principal Linda
- Sophia Torres as Penny
- Elizabeth Marvel as Nancy
- Molly Ringwald as Aunt Val
- Bill Camp as Mr. Hunt
- Yul Vazquez as Uncle Dan
- Connor Ratliff as Mr. Watson

== Production ==
The film is written and directed by NB Mager. It is adapted from her short film Run Amok (2023), which screened at the Athena Film Festival and was shortlisted for Academy Award consideration. The feature is produced by Julie Christeas and Frank Hall Green of Tandem Pictures.

Principal photography took place in New York, with production tracking lists confirming a shoot date in January 2025.

== Release ==
Run Amok was selected for the U.S. Dramatic Competition at the 2026 Sundance Film Festival, which was held between January 22 and February 1, 2026. The film was cited by critics as one of the "Most Anticipated" films of the festival. It premiered on January 26, 2026.

In August 2026, Greenwich Entertainment acquired the distribution rights, for an early 2027 release.

== Reception ==
As of September 2026, holds an approval rating of 63% based on 32 reviews review aggregator website Rotten Tomatoes, the film .
