= The Perfect Wedding =

- Directed by: Scott Gabriel
- Written by: Suzanne Brockmann; Ed Gaffney; Jason T. Gaffney
- Produced by: Suzanne Brockmann; Ed Gaffney; Jason T. Gaffney
- Starring: Jason T. Gaffney; Eric Aragon
- Cinematography: Lauretta Prevost
- Edited by: Sofi Marshall
- Music by: Jack Gravina
- Production companies: small or LARGE Productions; Arcadia Creative
- Release date: April 22, 2012
- Running time: 82 minutes
- Country: United States
- Language: English

The Perfect Wedding is a 2012 independent romantic comedy film directed by Scott Gabriel from a script written by Suzanne Brockmann, Ed Gaffney, and Jason T. Gaffney. In 2013, it won the Bud Abbott Award for Feature Length Comedy at the Garden State Film Festival. It was released on VOD and DVD from distributor Wolfe Releasing in 2013.

The film was created because Brockmann and Gaffney's son, Jason T. Gaffney, was tired of seeing LGBT films that relied on stereotypes for their humor. The writers created a film where being gay was treated as a normal facet of life.

== Plot ==
The film takes place over Christmas weekend at the Fowlers' home where Alana Fowler is planning her wedding to Kirk. Alana and her brother Paul are both adopted by Richard and Meryl Fowler. One of Alana's friends, Roy, who is coming to help with the wedding planning, is an ex-boyfriend of Paul's. He doesn't want Paul to see that he is still single all these years later, so Roy brings Gavin Greene along to pose as his boyfriend. However, Gavin and Paul end up falling in love. In addition, Richard has just been diagnosed with early onset Alzheimer's. The family has to figure out how to cope with the news while planning the perfect wedding.

== Cast ==
- Jason T. Gaffney as Gavin Greene
- Eric Aragon as Paul Fowler
- James Rebhorn as Richard Fowler
- Kristine Sutherland as Meryl Fowler
- Apolonia Davalos as Alana Fowler
- Brenden Griffin as Kirk
- Annie Kerins as Vicki
- Sal Rendino as Zack
- Roger Stewart as Roy

== Release ==
The Perfect Wedding was an official selection at the Sarasota Film Festival (2012), the Spokane International Film Festival (2013), the Garden State Film Festival (2013), the North Carolina Gay & Lesbian Film Festival (2013), the Indiana LGBT Film Festival (2013), and the Long Island Gay & Lesbian Film Festival (2013).
