= James Rebhorn =

American actor (1948–2014)

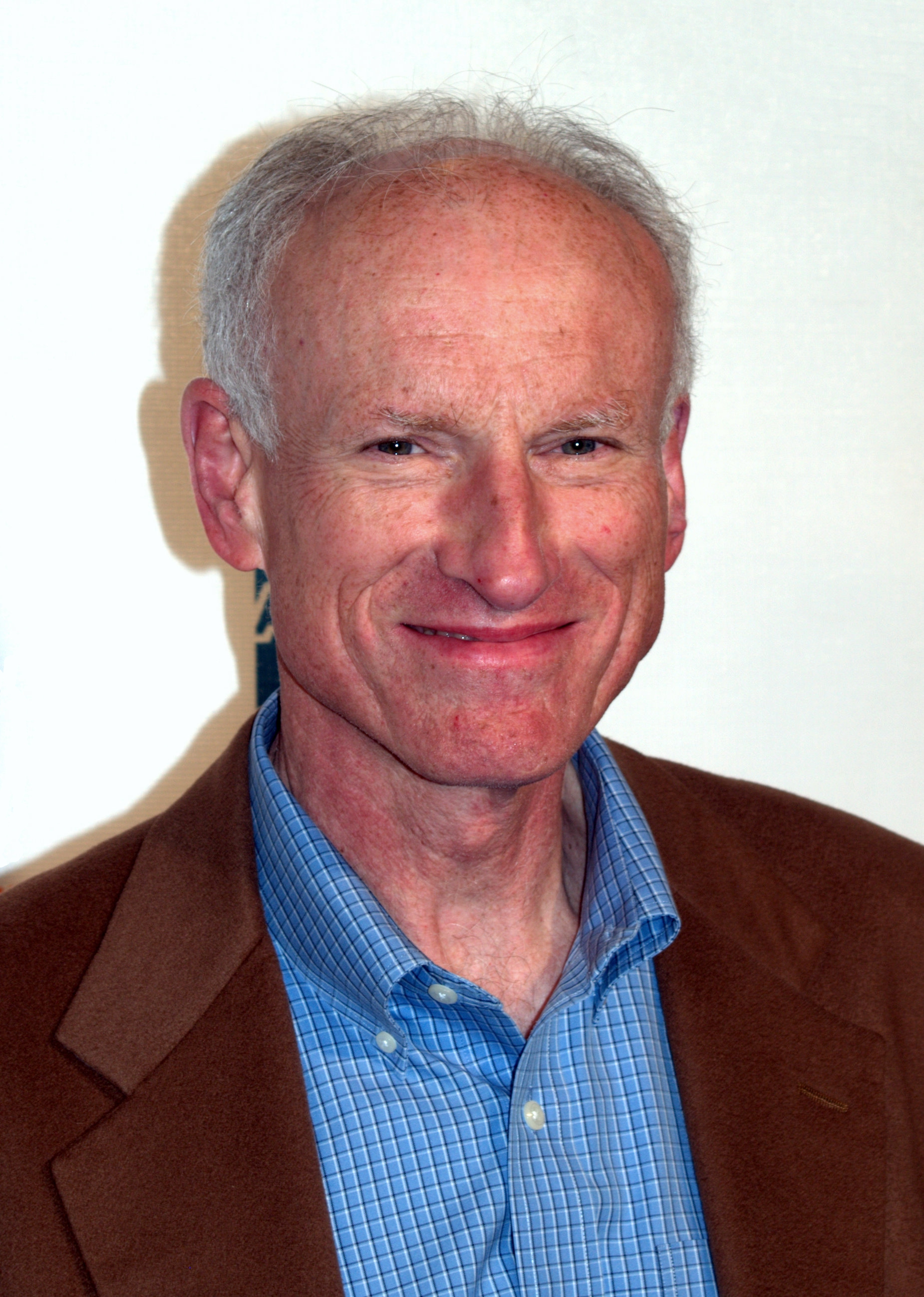
- Rebhorn at the 2009 Tribeca Film Festival
- Born: James Robert Rebhorn; September 1, 1948; Philadelphia, Pennsylvania, U.S.
- Died: March 21, 2014 (aged 65); South Orange, New Jersey, U.S.
- Education: Wittenberg University (BA); Columbia University (MFA)
- Occupation: Actor
- Years active: 1976–2013
- Spouse: Rebecca Fulton Linn (m. 1969)
- Children: 2

James Robert Rebhorn (September 1, 1948 – March 21, 2014) was an American character actor. Rebhorn appeared in over 100 films, television series, and plays.

Rebhorn portrayed George Wilbur in My Cousin Vinny, Dr. McElwaine in Basic Instinct, FBI Agent Flynn in White Sands and Mr. Trask in Scent of a Woman (all in 1992), John Merino in Up Close & Personal, Albert Nimziki in Independence Day, Charlie Reynolds in My Fellow Americans, Alvin Hooks in Snow Falling on Cedars, and Dr. Larry Banks in Meet the Parents.

He had several recurring roles in TV series, including Charles Garnett in Law & Order (where he also played other characters), Captain Elchisak in Third Watch, Bertram Webster in The Book of Daniel, Reese Hughes in White Collar, Carl Franklin in Big Lake, and Frank Mathison in Homeland.

== Early life ==
Rebhorn was born in Philadelphia, Pennsylvania, on September 1, 1948, the son of Ardell Frances (née Hoch) and James Harry Rebhorn, an industrial engineer and salesman. He was of German descent. Rebhorn moved to Anderson, Indiana, as a child and graduated from Madison Heights High School in 1966. A devout Lutheran, he attended Wittenberg University in Springfield, Ohio, where he studied political science.

While there, he was a member of the Lambda Chi Alpha fraternity. Richard S. Huffman was one of his instructors and directed him in a lead role in Aristophanes's Lysistrata as well as Molière's Tricks of Scapin. After graduating in 1970, Rebhorn moved to New York City, where he earned a Master of Fine Arts in acting from Columbia University's School of the Arts, and joined the metropolitan theater scene.

== Career ==
An early performance was in Butterflies are Free at the Peterborough Players in New Hampshire in 1974. Rebhorn played Peter Latham in Forty Carats at the GasLight Dinner Theatre in Salt Lake City in the 1970s. He was known both for portraying WASP stereotypes, lawyers, politicians, doctors, and military men, as well as portraying individuals engaged in or responsible for criminal behavior.

He delivered equally notable performances in a variety of other roles, including that of a brutal serial killer on NBC's Law & Order (he would later return to the show in the recurring role of defense attorney Charles Garnett), Ellard Muscatine in Lorenzo's Oil (1992), Fred Waters in Blank Check (1994), Clyde Frost, the father of famed bullrider Lane Frost, in 8 Seconds (1994), Lt. Tyler in White Squall (1996), and a shipping magnate in The Talented Mr. Ripley (1999).

One of his best known performances was in the popular 1996 film Independence Day, where he played Secretary of Defense Albert Nimziki. He acted in Scent of a Woman (1992), and played an expert witness in My Cousin Vinny (1992). He appeared in Carlito's Way as an obsessed district attorney the following year. Rebhorn played an FBI agent in the 1994 film Guarding Tess.

Rebhorn played several roles on television, including an abusive stepfather, Bradley Raines, on the soap opera Guiding Light from 1983 to 1985, and an abusive father, Henry Lange, on sister soap As the World Turns from 1988 to 1991. An earlier daytime role was as John Brady in Texas from 1981 to 1982.

In 1991, he played the role of Ezra in the television movie/pilot Plymouth. He cameoed in Madonna's video for her single "Bad Girl" along with Christopher Walken (1993). In 1994, he appeared in an episode of the Nickelodeon series The Adventures of Pete & Pete, titled "Farewell, My Little Viking", as Mr. McFlemp.

In 1998, he played the district attorney in the two part series finale of Seinfeld. He appeared in supporting roles in Regarding Henry, The Game, The Talented Mr. Ripley and Meet the Parents. In 2003, he appeared in the Chris Rock film Head of State, as Democratic Senator Bill Arnot. In 2004, he appeared in the television miniseries Reversible Errors. His role in the short-lived and controversial NBC drama The Book of Daniel cast him as the father of the title character. From 2009 to 2013, Rebhorn played the recurring role of Reese Hughes, the FBI white-collar division chief, on White Collar.

Starting in 2011, Rebhorn appeared in the Showtime series Homeland as Frank Mathison, father of the series' main character Carrie Mathison, played by Claire Danes. His character suffered from bipolar disorder like Danes's character did. However, Frank had been able to get it under control and became quite functional on a daily basis with the correct dosing of medications, and would often encourage Carrie to do the same. Rebhorn's death in 2014 meant his character died in the show as well. The fourth-season finale of Homeland was dedicated to him.

In 2004, he appeared on Broadway as Juror 4 in the Roundabout Theatre Company production of Twelve Angry Men at the American Airlines Theatre.

Rebhorn appeared as a judge in Baby Mama. In the movie The Box, Rebhorn portrayed a NASA scientist. He had a recurring role on the series White Collar as Special Agent Reese Hughes. Rebhorn co-starred in the Comedy Central sitcom Big Lake in 2010. He played Max Kenton's uncle in the movie Real Steel in 2011. He starred as Oren in the miniseries Coma. Rebhorn starred as Gary Pandamiglio in the 2012 Mike Birbiglia comedy Sleepwalk with Me.

In 2012, he played the role of Archbishop McGovern in "Leap of Faith", second-season episode of the CBS police procedural drama Blue Bloods. He co-starred in the romantic comedy The Perfect Wedding in 2013. His stage career included seven Broadway productions, as well as numerous appearances with New York City's Roundabout Theatre Company.

== Personal life ==
Rebhorn was married to Rebecca Linn and was the father of two daughters.

== Death ==
Rebhorn died at his home in South Orange, New Jersey on March 21, 2014, as a result of melanoma, which he had been battling since 1992. He was 65 years old. Rebhorn wrote his own obituary.

== Filmography ==
=== Film ===
Year	Title	Role	Notes
1976	The Yum-Yum Girls	Casting Director	
1980	He Knows You're Alone	Professor Carl Mason	
1982	Soup for One	Lawyer	
1983	Silkwood	Los Alamos Doctor	
1985	Cat's Eye	Drunk Businessman	
1986	Whatever It Takes	Michael Manion	
1988	The House on Carroll Street	The Official	
1988	Heart of Midnight	Richard	
1990	Desperate Hours	Prosecutor	
1991	Regarding Henry	Dr. Sultan	
1991	Shadows and Fog	Hacker's Vigilante #1	
1992	My Cousin Vinny	George Wilbur	
1992	Basic Instinct	Dr. McElwaine	
1992	White Sands	FBI Agent Flynn	
1992	Wind	George	
1992	Scent of a Woman	Mr. Trask	
1992	Lorenzo's Oil	Ellard Muscatine	
1993	Carlito's Way	Bill Norwalk	
1994	Blank Check	Fred Waters	
1994	8 Seconds	Clyde Frost	
1994	Guarding Tess	Howard Schaeffer	
1994	I Love Trouble	Mando, The Thin Man	
1996	White Squall	Tyler	
1996	Up Close & Personal	John Merino	
1996	If Lucy Fell	Simon Ackerman	
1996	Independence Day	Albert Nimziki	
1996	My Fellow Americans	Charlie Reynolds	
1997	The Game	Jim Feingold	
1998	All of It	Bill Holbeck	
1999	Snow Falling on Cedars	Alvin Hooks	
1999	The Talented Mr. Ripley	Herbert Greenleaf	
2000	The Adventures of Rocky and Bullwinkle	President Signoff	
2000	Meet the Parents	Dr. Larry Banks	
2001	Scotland, PA	Norm Duncan	
2001	Last Ball	Mr. Corcoran	
2002	The Adventures of Pluto Nash	Belcher	
2002	Far from Heaven	Dr. Bowman	
2003	The Trade	John Torman	
2003	Head of State	Senator Bill Arnot	
2003	Vacuums	Dirk Bentley	
2003	Cold Mountain	Doctor	
2004	The Last Shot	Abe White	
2006	How to Eat Fried Worms	Principal Nelson Burdock	
2006	Bernard and Doris	Waldo Taft	
2007	Spinning into Butter	President Winston Garvey	
2007	Anamorph	Chief Lewellyn Brainard	
2008	Baby Mama	Judge	
2008	An American Affair	Lucian Carver	
2009	The International	New York D.A.	
2009	Don McKay	Dr. Lance Pryce	
2009	The Box	Norm Cahill	
2010	A Little Help	Dr. Bronstein	
2010	The Sparrow and the Tigress	Ernest	
2011	The Line	The Man	Short
2011	Real Steel	Marvin	
2012	Sleepwalk with Me	Frank	
2012	The Odd Life of Timothy Green	Joseph Crudstaff	
2012	The Perfect Wedding	Richard Fowler	
2013	Before I Sleep	Priest	Final film role

=== Television ===
Year	Title	Role	Notes
1977	The Doctors	Tom Carroll	
1981–1982	Texas	John	Recurring cast member
1982	Will: G. Gordon Liddy	Peter Maroulis	Television film
1983	Sessions	Harry	Television film
1983–1985/1989	Guiding Light	Bradley Raines	Cast member
1984	He's Fired, She's Hired	Man on Phone	Television film
1985	ABC Weekend Special	Charlie Riley	Episode: "The Adventures of Con Sawyer and Hucklemary Finn"
1985	North and South	Major Anderson	Episode: "Episode Six"
1985	Kane and Abel	Federal Prosecutor	Episode: "Episode Two"
1985–1986	Search for Tomorrow	Al Miller	
1985–1986	Kate & Allie	Derek	2 episodes
1985–1987	Spenser: For Hire	Father Hoyt / Paul Manning	2 episodes
1986	Rockabye	Arthur Reardon	Television film
1986	A Deadly Business	Corbett	Television film
1986	The Equalizer	Eric	Episode: "Prelude"
1987	Kojak: The Price of Justice	Quibro	Television film
1988	The Equalizer	Gant	Episode: "Last Call"
1989	Great Performances	Dr. Gibbs	Episode: "Our Town"
1989	Kojak: Fatal Flaw	Slusher	Television film
1989	ABC Afterschool Special	Dan Jensen	Episode: "A Town's Revenge"
1989	Kojak: Ariana	Slusher	Television film
1990	H.E.L.P.	Perry	Episode: "Fire Down Below"
1990	Against the Law	Mayor	Episode: "We, the Jury"
1990	Wiseguy	Agent White	3 episodes
1990	Everyday Heroes	Jim	Television film
1990	As the World Turns	Angus Oliver / Henry Lange	3 episodes
1991	Sarah, Plain and Tall	William Wheaton	Television film
1991	Plymouth	Ezra	Television film
1991	Dead and Alive: The Race for Gus Farace	Timothy Lanigan	Television film
1992	I'll Fly Away	Roger Thorne	Episode: "The Slightest Distance"
1992	Deadly Matrimony	Lieutenant Lloyd Butler	Television film
1992–2008	Law & Order	Charles Garnett / Dr. Horace Garrison / Albert Lawrence Cheney	7 episodes
1993	JFK: Reckless Youth	St. John	2 episodes
1993	Skylark	William Wheaton	Television film
1994	The Adventures of Pete & Pete	John McFlemp	2 episodes
1995	The Buccaneers	Mr. Closson	Episode: "Invasion"
1995	The Wright Verdicts	Will Garrett	Episode: "Special Prosecutor"
1996	Mistrial	Mayor Taylor	Television film
1997	New York Undercover	Tuckett	Episode: "The Promised Land"
1998	From the Earth to the Moon	Harrison Storms	Episode: "Apollo One"
1998	Seinfeld	District Attorney Hoyt	Episode: "The Finale"
1998	A Bright Shining Lie	Ambassador Ellsworth Bunker	Television film
1999–2002	Third Watch	Captain Elchisak	6 episodes
2000	Now and Again	General Frederick Augustus Irving	2 episodes
2000	Hopewell	John Melville	Television film
2001	Amy & Isabelle	Avery Clark	Television film
2001	The Practice	Attorney John Rapherson	2 episodes
2001	UC: Undercover	Deputy Warden Richard Petrocelli	Episode: "The Siege"
2003	Hack	Richard Farrell	2 episodes
2004	Reversible Errors	Erno Erdai	Television film
2006	Waterfront	Thomas Porter	2 episodes
2006	The Book of Daniel	Bertram Webster	6 episodes
2006	Candles on Bay Street	Farmer Frieden	Television film
2007	The Knights of Prosperity	Harrison Plunk	Episode: "Operation: Rent Money"
2008	Comanche Moon	Gov. Elisha Pease	Miniseries
2008	Canterbury's Law	Dr. Allen Petch	Episode: "Baggage"
2008	Boston Legal	Wade Mathis	2 episodes
2009	Royal Pains	Will	Episode: "No Man Is an Island"
2009–2013	White Collar	Reese Hughes	16 episodes
2010	30 Rock	Dr. Kaplan	2 episodes
2010	Big Lake	Carl Franklin	10 episodes
2011–2013	Homeland	Frank Mathison	8 episodes
2012	Blue Bloods	Archbishop McGovern	Episode: "Leap of Faith"
2012	Coma	Oren	Miniseries
2012	Made in Jersey	Judge Hudnut	Episode: "Ridgewell"
2013	The Good Wife	Wilkes Ingersol	Episode: "Boom De Yah Da"
2013	Enlightened	Charles Szidon	4 episodes
