= Big Lake (TV series) =

American television series

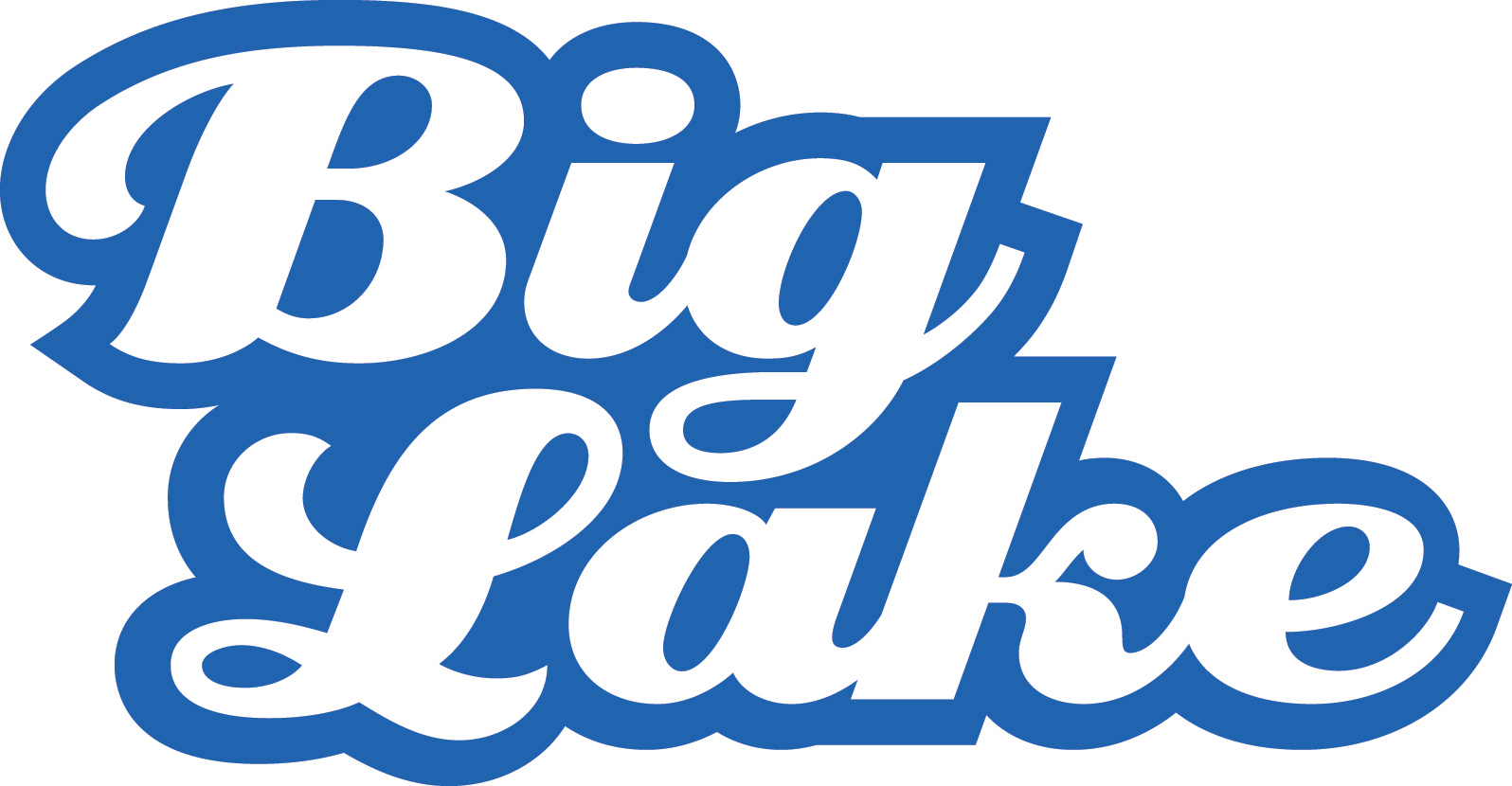
- Genre: Sitcom
- Created by: Lew Morton
- Starring: Chris Gethard; Horatio Sanz; Chris Parnell; Deborah Rush; Dylan Blue; James Rebhorn
- Composers: Kyle Crusham; Kevin Hoetger
- Country of origin: United States
- Original language: English
- No. of seasons: 1
- No. of episodes: 10

Production
- Executive producers: Adam McKay; Chris Henchy; Lew Morton; Will Ferrell
- Camera setup: Multi-camera
- Running time: 21 minutes
- Production companies: Gary Sanchez Productions; Motron Productions; Lionsgate Television

Original release
- Network: Comedy Central
- Release: August 17 – September 14, 2010

Big Lake is an American sitcom on Comedy Central that debuted on August 17, 2010, and ran for one season. The series was originally designed as a vehicle for Jon Heder, but Heder left the project shortly before production started and was replaced with Chris Gethard. The series was picked up using a similar model as Tyler Perry's House of Payne and Meet The Browns with an initial 10 episode order by Comedy Central, with an option to pick up the series for an additional 90 episodes, to have 100 episodes available for syndication. The deal was not picked up after Comedy Central passed on a second season.

== Premise ==
After losing his lucrative banking job, Josh is forced to move back to his hometown of Big Lake, Pennsylvania. Now living with his parents on their couch, Josh swears to earn back all the money he lost and repay his parents. There he reunites with his childhood pal Glenn and his favorite high school teacher Mr. Henkel. Each week the three come up with new money making schemes, although due to the ridiculous nature of them, they tend to fail and go horribly wrong every time.

== Cast ==
- Chris Gethard as Josh Franklin — A disgraced Wall Street hotshot who lost his job and all his money. He now has to move back in with his parents.
- Horatio Sanz as Glenn Cordoba — Josh's childhood best friend who was recently released from prison.
- Chris Parnell as Chris Henkel — Josh's favorite teacher from high school, although he has no memory of Josh being one of his former students. Despite being a history teacher, he hates history and despises teaching. He is also the "Deputy Mayor" of Big Lake.
- Deborah Rush as Linda Franklin — Josh's overly cheerful mother who is often oblivious to everything going on around her, likely caused by her addiction to diet pills.
- Dylan Blue as Jeremy Franklin — Josh's little brother who isn't as innocent as he pretends to be. He appears to be involved in many criminal activities.
- James Rebhorn as Carl Franklin — Josh's father. He despises Josh for losing his entire life savings.

== Episodes ==
No.	Title	Directed by	Written by	Original release date	Prod. code
1	"Josh Comes Home"	Don Scardino	Lew Morton	August 17, 2010	101
Josh tries to make Big Lake the goth Field Of Dreams by selling the mayor a baseball signed by Barry Bonds and Marilyn Manson.
2	"Lee Harvey Osworld"	Don Scardino	Hayes Davenport	August 17, 2010	108
Glenn wants the mayor to help him open a Lee Harvey Oswald museum and make Big Lake synonymous with the man who killed John F. Kennedy.
3	"Fad Diet"	Don Scardino	Alan J. Higgins	August 24, 2010	105
Glenn has been losing weight eating only French dip sandwiches so Josh tries to have his dad sell it as a diet.
4	"Chris Moves In"	Don Scardino	Teleplay by : Lew Morton & T. Sean Shannon; Story by : Max Ricci	August 24, 2010	109
Chris makes Josh feel bad so he asks his parents if Chris can stay with them.The family quickly likes Chris more and Josh moves into the school. Meanwhile, Glenn has a relationship with his unstable parole officer.
5	"Josh Goes to Work"	Don Scardino	Chris Henchy	August 31, 2010	110
Josh starts working at Cheddar Creek and tries to change everything while Jeremy has turned the restaurant into a gay disco at night.
6	"Jeremy Gets Caught"	Don Scardino	Mike Schwartz	August 31, 2010	102
Josh locks the door and gets Jeremy grounded, then finds new friends for him.
7	"Therapy"	Don Scardino	Alan J. Higgins	September 7, 2010	104
Josh brings home an alcoholic to counsel his family while Chris must tutor a dummy.
8	"Chris is Mayor for 24 Minutes"	Don Scardino	T. Sean Shannon	September 7, 2010	103
Chris and Josh make big plans for when Chris is mayor while Jeremy gets his mom arrested muling illegal cigarettes.
9	"Chris Falls in Love"	Don Scardino	Berkley Johnson	September 14, 2010	106
Chris falls in love with Josh's mom and Josh teaches Chris' class.
10	"The Interview"	Don Scardino	T. Sean Shannon	September 14, 2010	107
Josh is offered a job by an old banking buddy but he doesn't want to take it for the wrong reasons.
