= Chris Gethard =

American actor and comedian

- Gethard in 2024
- Born: Christopher Paul Gethard; May 23, 1980 (age 46); West Orange, New Jersey, U.S.
- Education: Rutgers University-New Brunswick
- Occupations: Actor; sketch comedian; stand-up comedian; writer
- Years active: 2001–present
- Television: The Chris Gethard Show
- Spouse: Hallie Bulleit (m. 2014)
- Children: 1

Christopher Paul Gethard (/ˈɡɛθərd/ GETH-ərd; born May 23, 1980) is an American comedian, actor, writer and podcaster. An improv teacher at Upright Citizens Brigade Theatre for much of the 2000s, Gethard played the lead role of Josh Franklin in Big Lake (2010), Comedy Central's first attempt at a multi-cam sitcom, and played Bill in the film Don't Think Twice (2016). He debuted his stand-up comedy album and half-hour television special in 2014 and his hour-long TV special in 2017. Variety listed him in its '10 Comics to Watch' in 2010, and Vulture listed him in its 'Comedians You Should and Will Know in 2013'.

He was the creator and host of The Chris Gethard Show, a variety talk show he self-produced on public-access cable TV channel MNN (2011–15) before its relaunch on Fusion TV (2015–16) and a live broadcast run on TruTV (2017–18); the sketch comedy variety show Chris Gethard Presents on MNN (2019–20); and the livestreaming channel Planet Scum Live on Twitch (2020–22). He hosted Dark Side of the Ring: After Dark on Vice TV (2020) and played the role of Eddie on Space Force on Netflix (2020–22).

Gethard began hosting his podcast Beautiful Stories from Anonymous People in March 2016. Time listed it in its 'The 100 Best Podcasts of All Time' in July 2025, and Paste listed it No. 26 on its 'The 30 Best Podcasts of the 2010s' in November 2019. He hosted the podcast New Jersey is the World from January 2021 to November 2024.

== Early life ==
Gethard grew up in West Orange, New Jersey, the son of Sally and Ken Gethard, and attended Redwood Elementary and Edison Middle School. When he was three years old, Gethard was next-yard neighbors with a seven-year-old with dwarfism who was his friend and bully. Gethard attended West Orange High School and was a member of its marching band, the Marching Mountaineers. His older brother had a best friend, Mike D, who ran a fanzine called Marcia and organized rock shows. In his senior year of high school, Gethard wrote a fanzine called No Sign of Charlie and released two issues. According to Gethard, readers thought it wasn't the most well-made but was funny. As a child, Gethard was a visitor of the infamous Action Park.

In his sophomore year of college, in 2000, he joined the improv troupe at the Cabarat Theatre at Rutgers University–New Brunswick. During the summer, Gethard began taking classes at Upright Citizens Brigade Theatre in Manhattan, New York. Gethard graduated from Rutgers University in May 2002 with a bachelor's degree in American studies. He quit drinking alcohol a few months before his 22nd birthday. He served as the Special Projects Coordinator for Rutgers' Cabarat Theatre from 2000 to 2002.

== Career ==
New York offers more breathing room and more freedom. Andy Warhol, punk rock, that's all out of here. You can go darker and stranger and more abstract in New York. The audience here actually craves experimentation. What works in LA is a sure thing, what they already know has worked before [...] Being happy and being successful don't need to be mutually exclusive, but often they are. In LA, I could pay my rent but I'd have to walk a much more traditional track. But the thing I'm best at is being weird. So do I wanna keep being weird or go out there and be less weird but make more money? I don't know. I have to decide soon.

— Chris Gethard, Splitsider, October 11, 2011.

In 2001, at age 21, Gethard began doing paid acting gigs on Late Night with Conan O'Brien portraying teenagers, a result of his younger appearance during his teenage years and much of his twenties. He briefly lived in Los Angeles in 2004, before settling in Queens, New York later that year.

Gethard began doing stand-up comedy in 2006. He was a guest writer on Saturday Night Live in 2007 for two weeks. In 2009, Gethard served as an actor and writer on Undisputed, an unaired pilot for Fox. The mockumentary sitcom depicts a fictional professional wrestling promotion with Gethard portraying an in-show writer. Gethard became friends with Colt Cabana who he met during filming.

In 2013, the Independent Film Channel asked Gethard to write a pilot based on his book, A Bad Idea I'm About to Do. IFC gave Gethard a year, in addition to writing his pilot, to market for them at festivals and produce web content. He wrote a series of articles for Vice that year, and Vulture included Gethard in its 'Comedians You Should and Will Know in 2013' on April 29.

On January 30, 2014, Gethard shot a pilot for Comedy Central for a commercial TV network iteration of TCGS. Colt Cabana accidentally injured Michael Cera's groin during filming.

In August 2016, Gethard participated for the first time in the Edinburgh Festival Fringe, performing his show Career Suicide dealing with his experiences of depression, suicide attempts and alcoholism. During his run at the festival, he also recorded an episode of Stuart Goldsmith's "Comedian's Comedian Podcast", which was published in December 2016.

On May 6, 2017, HBO broadcast Career Suicide, an evening of standup comedy based on Gethard's off-Broadway show of the same title. Produced by Judd Apatow, the HBO special has garnered praise from The New York Times, Time, NPR, The A.V. Club, USA Today, Entertainment Weekly, The Daily Beast, Paste, The Huffington Post and Splitsider.

On October 10, 2019, he was featured in a 30-minute YouTube documentary called Laughing Matters, created by SoulPancake in collaboration with Funny or Die, wherein a variety of comedians discuss mental health.

=== The Chris Gethard Show ===
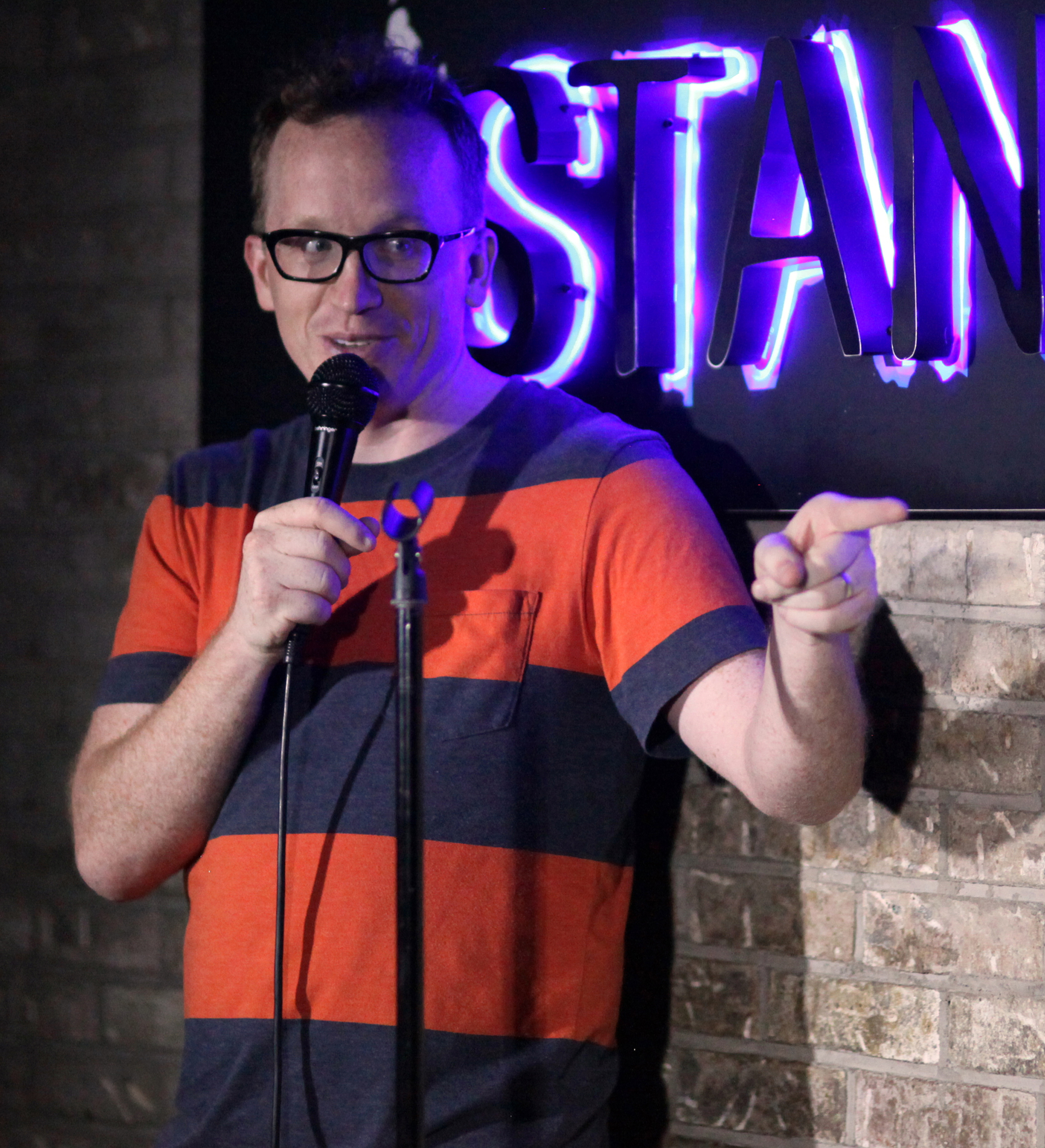
Gethard in 2016

Gethard hosted The Chris Gethard Show, a talk show that originally aired on the Manhattan Neighborhood Network and was streamed around the world on Gethard's website. The show began as a live piece at the Upright Citizens Brigade Theater in 2009. Gethard then went to Los Angeles to pitch a network version of the show, but ended up returning to New York City to produce it for public-access because he wanted to retain the chaotic, cheap feel of early MTV talk shows. The show has since grown to consist of both stage and filmed performances. It has developed a reputation for outrageous spectacle, often featuring awkward viewer calls, high-concept group segments and Gethard subjecting himself to abuse, including an episode where he hired a kickboxer to hit him if he failed to answer simple questions about his friends. In a 2016 interview with Fresh Air's Terry Gross he said he felt that The Chris Gethard Show had a manic energy, and was a way for him to channel his manic thoughts, and behavior. As a child, Gethard admired comedians who seemed to be able to do whatever they wanted, such as Howard Stern, Andy Kaufman, and David Letterman. This interest influenced the style of The Chris Gethard Show and laid the groundwork for Gethard's comedic persona.

The show became known for its audience interaction. One episode featured a woman calling in to inquire about the purpose of the show. Gethard invited her to join them and she became a regular for four months. The show continued this trend through its public access run, having a new "random" as a cast member for 15 episodes each.

The show was entirely self-funded, and none of the performers were paid for their time during its public access time. However, this largely surfaced as result of the style of Upright Citizens Brigade shows and the aesthetic of the show, Gethard had stated that he would not be opposed to the show being picked up by a television network. He met with a number of network producers, but the show was not picked up, the primary concern being its unpredictable nature and frequent swearing. In early 2014, Comedy Central ordered a pilot from TCGS, to be co-produced by Funny or Die, leading to a brief hiatus from the weekly program. The pilot was taped but ultimately not picked up by Comedy Central. The show returned to MNN from April to January 2015. In its final MNN episode, it was announced that the show had been picked up by Fusion, where it ran for two seasons.

Throughout the show's many manifestations, it has attracted a number of celebrity guests, including P. Diddy, Amy Poehler, Will Ferrell, Paul Giamatti, and Lena Dunham.

After its run on Fusion, The Chris Gethard Show was picked up for a third season by truTV, and began airing live episodes in August 2017. In August 2018, Gethard announced the show had been canceled and would not return for another season.

=== Beautiful/Anonymous ===
Gethard hosts the Earwolf podcast Beautiful/Anonymous, which first aired on March 15, 2016. The following is Earwolf's description of the show: "1 phone call. 1 hour. No names. No holds barred. That’s the premise behind Beautiful Stories from Anonymous People, hosted by comedian Chris Gethard. Every week, Chris opens the phone line to one anonymous caller, and he can’t hang up first, no matter what. From shocking confessions and family secrets to philosophical discussions and shameless self-promotion, anything can and will happen!" He won the Webby Award for Best Host in 2017.

=== In Your Dreams ===
Gethard co-hosted Earwolf's podcast, In Your Dreams, with Gary Richardson. The podcast first aired on December 12, 2016, with special guest comedian Aparna Nancherla, and the ninth and final episode aired on February 6, 2017.

=== Planet Scum Live ===
Gethard has hosted the show Planet Scum Live, the title of which was given to his live streaming comedy network, since May 3, 2020.

=== New Jersey is the World ===
In January 2021, Gethard debuted a new podcast, New Jersey is the World. The podcast features Gethard discussing New Jersey history, lore, food, and more with his co-hosts, several childhood friends, and guests.

=== Books ===
Gethard is also the author of Weird NY, a book detailing the ghost stories and urban legends of New York City, and A Bad Idea I'm About to Do, a collection of stories from Gethard's life, which has been highlighted on This American Life. Previously, Gethard served as an editorial assistant for the popular Weird NJ and Weird US publications. On October 16, 2018, Gethard's self-help narrative Lose Well was published out of HarperCollins's HarperOne imprint.

== Personal life ==
Gethard married Hallie Bulleit, leader of The Chris Gethard Show band The LLC and lead singer of The Unlovables. on August 30, 2014, in Brooklyn, New York. The service was performed by fellow Chris Gethard Show cast member Murf Meyer. His wife is vegetarian.

Chris Gethard has been diagnosed with manic depression. He stated that early on the mania portion of the manic depression diagnosis was worse than the depression portion. He also said he manages his symptoms through medication, therapy, and support from his wife.

Gethard is a fan of professional wrestling. His favorite sport is basketball and he is a fans of the New York Knicks in the NBA. His favorite player growing up was John Starks who went on to appear on The Chris Gethard Show in 2016. He is a fan of The Smiths and has two tattoos related to the band. One of them is Morrissey's signature on his right shoulder (based on an actual signature he got in marker on his arm) which he had tattooed on March 23, 2009. The other being a tattoo on his right biceps saying "It takes strength to be gentle and kind," a lyric from "I Know It's Over". Gethard became a fan of Star Wars during his childhood and memorized the Star Wars Encyclopedia.

== Filmography and discography ==
=== Stand-up comedy releases ===
Solo albums and TV specials
Title	Release date	Debut medium
My Comedy Album	April 22, 2014	Audio streaming
The Half Hour: Chris Gethard	June 20, 2014	Television (Comedy Central)
Career Suicide	May 6, 2017	Television (HBO)
Taylor Ham, Egg, and Cheese	December 18, 2019	Audio streaming
Half My Life	June 1, 2021	Streaming TV (Video on demand)
A Father & the Sun	September 21, 2023	Audio streaming (Audible)
A Father & the Sun	September 23, 2025	Streaming TV (YouTube)

=== Film ===
Year	Title	Role	Notes
2005	M.A.S.	Head Elf	Video short
2009	May the Best Man Win	Tommy	
2010	Snoopy Lamp	Officer Wengert	Video short
2010	The Other Guys	Clerk	
2011	Adults	Michael	Video short
2011	A Novel Romance	Young Boss No. 1	
2012	The Dictator	Clark	
2013	Iron Man 3	Juan	Uncredited
2013	The Angriest Man in Brooklyn	Dr. Jordan Reed	
2013	The Heat	Himself	
2016	Don't Think Twice	Bill	
2016	Ghostbusters	Himself	Extra
2020	Class Action Park	Himself	
2022	Out of Office	Winston	Television film (Comedy Central)
2023	She Came to Me	Carl	
2024	What's In The Box? – The Unauthorized History of Chris Gethard's Planet Scum Live	Himself	

=== Television ===
Year	Title	Role	Notes
2001–2003	Late Night with Conan O'Brien	Various characters	
2004	Crossballs: The Debate Show	Writer / Various characters	
2004	Hope & Faith	Wally	Episode: "Hope Gets a Job"
2007	Saturday Night Live	Guest writer	Episode: "Scarlett Johansson/Björk"
2007	The Knights of Prosperity	Burton Employee	Episode: "Operation: Caught on Tape"
2010	Big Lake	Josh Franklin	Lead role; 10 episodes
2010–2012	Late Night with Jimmy Fallon	Himself	3 episodes
2011	The Back Room	Himself/Banjo Kid from Deliverance	TV series short; 2 Episodes
2011	Hardly Working	Hugh Jackman/C-Snap	TV series short
2011	Louie	Open mic host	Episode: "Eddie"
2011	Bored to Death	Super Ray Fan	Episode: "Nothing I Can't Handle by Running Away"
2011–2018	The Chris Gethard Show	Host	
2012	Conan	Himself	
2012	Bunk	Himself	
2013	The Office	Trevor	3 episodes
2014–2016	Broad City	Todd	6 episodes
2015	Parks and Recreation	Kipp Bunthart	Episode: "Pie-Mary"
2016	Netflix Presents: The Characters	Male Celeb	Episode: "Natasha Rothwell"
2015–2016	Inside Amy Schumer	Steve/Chris/Juror No. 2	3 episodes
2017	Blindspot	Dr. Gary Lemarsh	Episode: "Lepers Repel"
2018	No Activity	Zach	3 episodes
2018	Night Train with Wyatt Cenac	Himself	Season 2, episode 1
2019	Crashing	Himself	Episode: "Mulaney"
2019	Helpsters	Pete's Dad	Episode: "Dancer Dave/Astronaut Amrita"
2019–2020	Chris Gethard Presents	Himself/Producer	
2020	Awkwafina Is Nora from Queens	Toby	2 episodes
2020	Dark Side of the Ring: After Dark	Himself	Host; 8 episodes
2020–2022	Planet Scum Live	Himself	Host
2020–2022	Space Force	Eddie	6 episodes
2020–2022	The George Lucas Talk Show	Himself	11 episodes
2022	Would I Lie to You? (US)	Himself	Episode: "Show Goat"
2022	Everything's Trash	Atticus Wolinsky	2 episodes
2023	Lucky Hank	Jeffrey Epstein	2 episodes
2026	The Fall and Rise of Reggie Dinkins	Marty	4 episodes
2026	The Creep Tapes	Dave	1 epiosde

== Bibliography ==
Books

- Weird New York: Your Guide to New York's Local Legends and Best Kept Secrets (2010)
- A Bad Idea I'm About to Do: True Tales of Seriously Poor Judgment and Stunningly Awkward Adventure (2012)
- Lose Well (2018)
- The Lonely Dad Conversations (2023)
- Dad at Peace (2024)

Select essays and articles

- A Speech for My High School (Medium, 2019) A Speech for My High School
- Dad on Pills: Fatherhood and Mental Illness (Scribd, 2022)'Dad on Pills': NJ comedian Chris Gethard tackles parenthood, mental illness
- Why I Want My Son to Grow Up in Jersey (New Jersey Fan Club, Rutgers University Press, 2022)
- The Only Living Comedian in New York: Chris Gethard on Avoiding Los Angeles (Vulture, 2016) The Only Living Comedian in New York: Chris Gethard on Avoiding Los Angeles
