= The Chris Gethard Show =

- Created by: Chris Gethard
- Written by: JD Amato; Noah Forman; Chris Gethard; Dru Johnston; Julio Torres
- Directed by: JD Amato
- Starring: Chris Gethard; Shannon O'Neill; Bethany Hall; Murf Meyer; David Bluvband
- Country of origin: United States
- Original language: English
- No. of episodes: 155 + 11 specials (MNN); 20 + 1 special (Fusion); 26 (truTV) (list of episodes)

Production
- Production locations: Manhattan, New York City, New York, United States
- Running time: 60 minutes (MNN); 22 minutes (Fusion, season 1); 43 minutes (Fusion, season 2; truTV)
- Production companies: Funny Or Die (2015–18); AGI Entertainment (2017–18); No Cool Kids (2017–18)

Original release
- Network: MNN (2011–15); Fusion (2015–16) truTV (2017–18)
- Release: June 22, 2011 – May 29, 2018

The Chris Gethard Show was a phone-in comedy and variety talk show created and hosted by Chris Gethard. Initially a live show at the Upright Citizens Brigade Theatre in New York, the show debuted on public-access channel Manhattan Neighborhood Network on June 22, 2011. In 2015, it moved to the cable channel Fusion, where it ran for two seasons before moving to truTV in 2017.

The show moved to truTV for its third season, with 16 live hour-long episodes beginning in August 2017. truTV later ordered an additional 10 episodes, bringing the third season total up to 26. The new batch of episodes premiered on March 20, 2018. In 2018 the show was canceled by truTV.

== Premise ==
The Chris Gethard Show takes calls in a comedy and variety talk show format around a theme, like "The Dumbest Thing You Ever Did". It bills itself as "the most bizarre and often saddest talk show in New York City." The show has been noted for its unpredictability. One writer said its "balance between control and chaos" involves Gethard being put up to a concept "and being totally willing to have the result be awkward or scary or funny or boring".

Almost every episode/performance of The Chris Gethard Show was created live, with the Fusion era being broadcast on Facebook Live but edited down for TV broadcast later that night. The other eras were shown directly to viewers.

== History ==
=== 2009–2011: Upright Citizens Brigade Theatre ===
In 2000, Chris Gethard began taking classes at the Upright Citizens Brigade while he was still a college student. There he met most of the people who went on to contribute to The Chris Gethard Show including current UCB Artistic Director, Shannon O'Neill. The Chris Gethard Show began as a monthly live show in 2009 and ran for two years. While initially popular, the show's audience began to dwindle and Gethard, on the advice of a friend, moved it to public access television.

=== 2011–2015: Manhattan Neighborhood Network ===
The first episode of The Chris Gethard Show on public access channel MNN aired on Wednesday, June 22, 2011 at 11pm. This became the regular time slot for the show for the next four years, wherein the show had over 140 episodes. Over that time, the show gained a cult following and a passionate community, many of whom became members of the show's cast and crew. In November 2013, Gethard announced that the show was asked to make a pilot episode for Comedy Central, but in May 2014 wrote on his Tumblr blog that they had elected not to air the episode.

The final episode of The Chris Gethard Show on public access aired on Wednesday, January 30, 2015.

=== 2015–2016: Fusion ===
The Chris Gethard Show premiered on Fusion on May 28, 2015. The first season of the Fusion era brought several changes to the show's format, most notably the cut in time from one hour to thirty minutes. However, the new set, increased production capacities, and bigger budget presented more opportunities for bits, more famous guests, and musical acts.

The second season of the Fusion era saw the show return to an hour-long format. In this season, the opening monologues became pre-taped.

The season 2 episode "One Man's Trash" received acclaim. In it, the audiences and guests must guess the contents of a dumpster. Gethard wrote it was the only episode where they "begged our network" for complete creative control, and "a lot of people say it's one of the greatest hours of television ever." It received a retrospective and the A.V. Club called it "the most famous and beloved episode of his show". Gethard hosted a watchalong rebroadcast of the episode on his website.

The final episode of Season 2 aired on June 1, 2016.

=== 2017–2018: truTV ===
On May 4, 2017, Gethard announced via Facebook Live that The Chris Gethard Show had been picked up by truTV, with sixteen weekly episodes to be broadcast live. It was later announced that the season would begin in August 2017. On the November 9, 2017 episode, Gethard announced that truTV had ordered an additional 10 episodes bringing the third season total up to 26. The new batch of episodes premiered on March 20, 2018.

The final episode of the third season aired on May 29, 2018. On August 6, 2018, Chris Gethard announced via Facebook that the show was canceled by truTV and is finished.

== Episodes ==
Season	Episodes	Originally released		
Season	Episodes	First released	Last released	Network
MNN 1	141	June 22, 2011	August 20, 2014	MNN
MNN 2	11	September 24, 2014	December 17, 2014	MNN
MNN 3	3	January 17, 2015	January 28, 2015	MNN
Fusion 1	10	May 28, 2015	August 13, 2015	Fusion
Fusion 2	10	March 30, 2016	June 1, 2016	Fusion
truTV	26	August 3, 2017	May 29, 2018	truTV
Specials	20	December 28, 2011	December 4, 2020	various

== Format ==
=== MNN ===
The public-access run of the show consisted of hour-long episodes broadcast live at 11pm on Wednesday nights on MNN. Each episode opened with the theme song, Gethard's introduction of the panel, and the episode title, traditionally the first words in the episode, spoken by band member Bill Florio. The episode title generally explained the concept of the episode, either as a call-in topic (such as "Tell Us Something You've Never Told Anybody") or an event happening in the studio (such as "Fetish Party").

Episodes mostly proceeded without a formal structure. Gethard took calls from viewers and discussed a variety of topics with the panel. The show was frequently "interrupted" by improvised character comedy from both guest stars and the show's writers. Many characters appeared on multiple occasions, forming running jokes and loose subplots for the show. Some of the most popular of these characters include Vacation Jason, Horse and Bee, The Hintmaster, The Beast Masturbator, Weenie Feet Bobbins, and The Guy Who Likes Cream But Not Too Much Cream. Many episodes featured short films or comedy videos from a variety of contributors, as well as a musical act that performed twice per episode. Several now-successful comedians appeared on the show early in their careers, including Vanessa Bayer, Aidy Bryant, John Mulaney, Conner O'Malley, and John Reynolds.

=== Fusion ===
The cable incarnation of the show featured a new set, more structured roles for cast members, and shorter episodes. The first season of the show on the Fusion network, airing in 2015, taped episodes on Tuesdays with an interactive live stream and aired an edited half-hour version on Thursdays. The second season extended episodes to an hour in length.

Celebrity guests, such as Will Ferrell, Maria Bamford, and Ira Glass, were featured in every episode of the Fusion seasons.

=== truTV ===
In the video announcing the show's move to cable network truTV, Gethard also announced that episodes would be once again broadcast live. The first season on truTV was planned for sixteen episodes, airing Thursday nights at 11pm. On November 9, 2017, the show was given an additional ten episode order, and moved to Tuesday nights. In August 2018, the show was canceled in a mutual decision between truTV and Gethard. Gethard posted a goodbye letter to Facebook.

== Cast and crew ==
=== Main cast ===
In the majority of episodes, the panel consists of:

- Chris Gethard: The show's host.
- Shannon O'Neill: Gethard's sidekick
- Bethany Hall: The show's "internet liaison", and the stage manager for the original UCB run.
- The Human Fish: A comedy character performed by David Bluvband. A fish-human hybrid said to be "figuring out the world of men", he mostly speaks in an "X vs. Y" format. Bluvband has also appeared on the show as himself.
- Murf Meyer: The show's announcer, known for his hedonistic behavior and his feud with the Order of Gimghoul, a secret society from North Carolina.
- Mimi Fischer: A hooper who hoop-dances behind the cast throughout the entire show. Also called "Mimi On The Hoops".
- The Random: A rotating panelist who the cast do not know prior to their joining the show. Each Random remained on the panel for 15 weeks. There were eight regular Randoms in total.
- The LLC: The house band of the show. They create original music for every episode of the show and have created themes for many recurring sketches and characters. The LLC are:
  - Hallie Bulleit (lead vocals, kazoo, percussion)
  - Bill Florio (glockenspiel, vocals)
  - Jon Vafiadis (guitar)
  - Alex Clute (guitar)
  - Mikey Erg (cajon, percussion, vocals)

And obviously, a huge specific shoutout to J.D. Amato. He killed himself for this thing harder than I did at many points, and his name isn't even on it. He is a genius, a badass, and most importantly a friend to a degree that I hope everyone getes to experience once in their lifetime. J.D, I owe you everything.

— Chris Gethard

=== Crew ===
Behind-the-scenes crew can appear on camera as often as the main cast, including:

- J.D. Amato: Executive Producer/Director.
- Noah Forman: Executive Producer/Head Writer
- Dru Johnston: Executive Producer/Head Writer
