= Manhattan Neighborhood Network =

American non-profit organization

Coordinates: 40.771076°N 73.988677°W

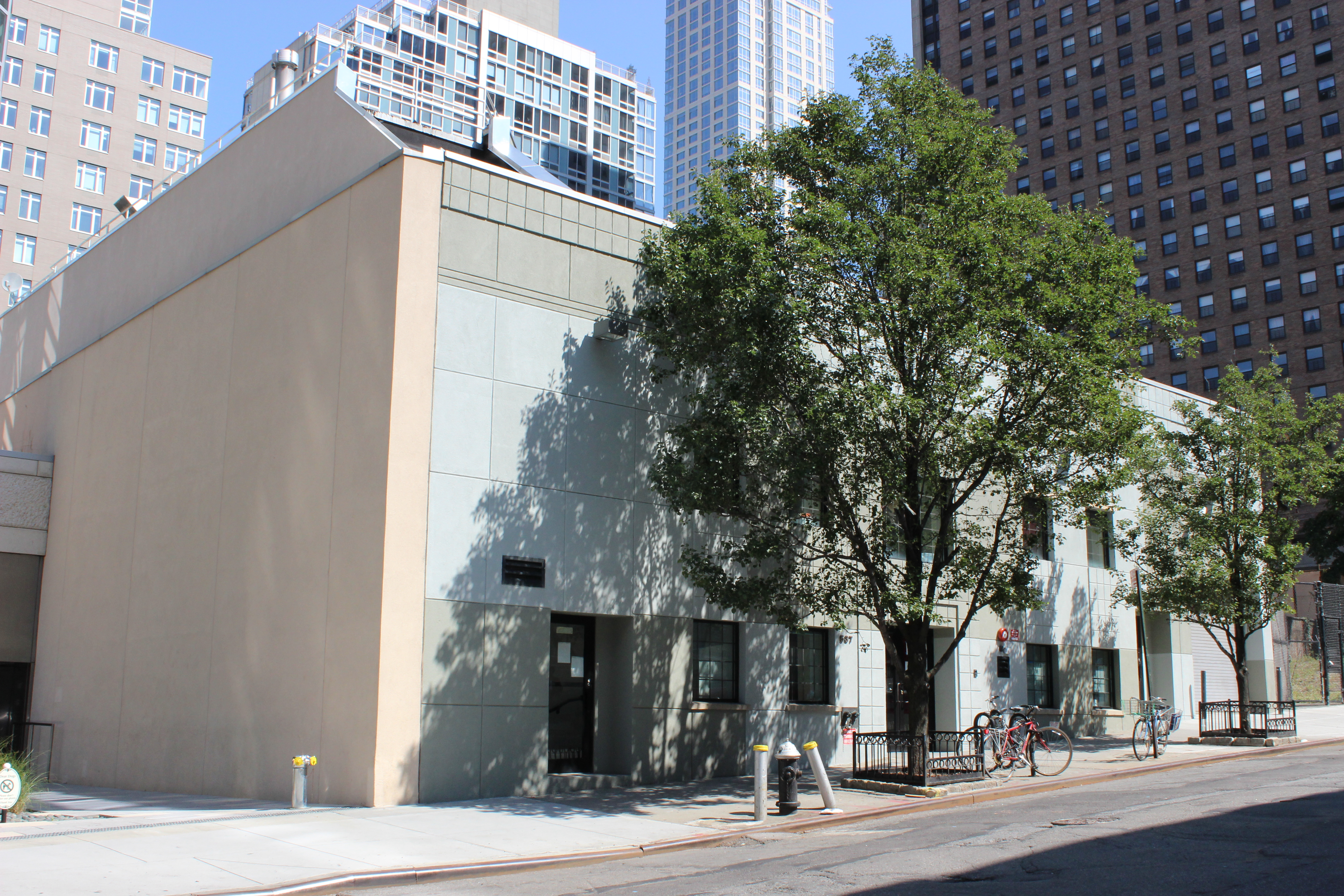
MNN Studios on 59th Street

Manhattan Neighborhood Network (MNN) is an American non-profit organization that broadcasts programming on five public-access television cable TV stations in Manhattan, New York City. MNN operates two community media centres – in midtown Manhattan and East Harlem – and provides facilities to community producers and organizations who want to create programming to air on one of MNN's five channels. It is considered to be the largest community media center in the United States.

In 2012, MNN opened the MNN El Barrio Firehouse Community Media Center in East Harlem. In March 2023, MNN moved its other location from 537 West 59th Street to a brand new facility at 509 West 38th Street.

== History ==
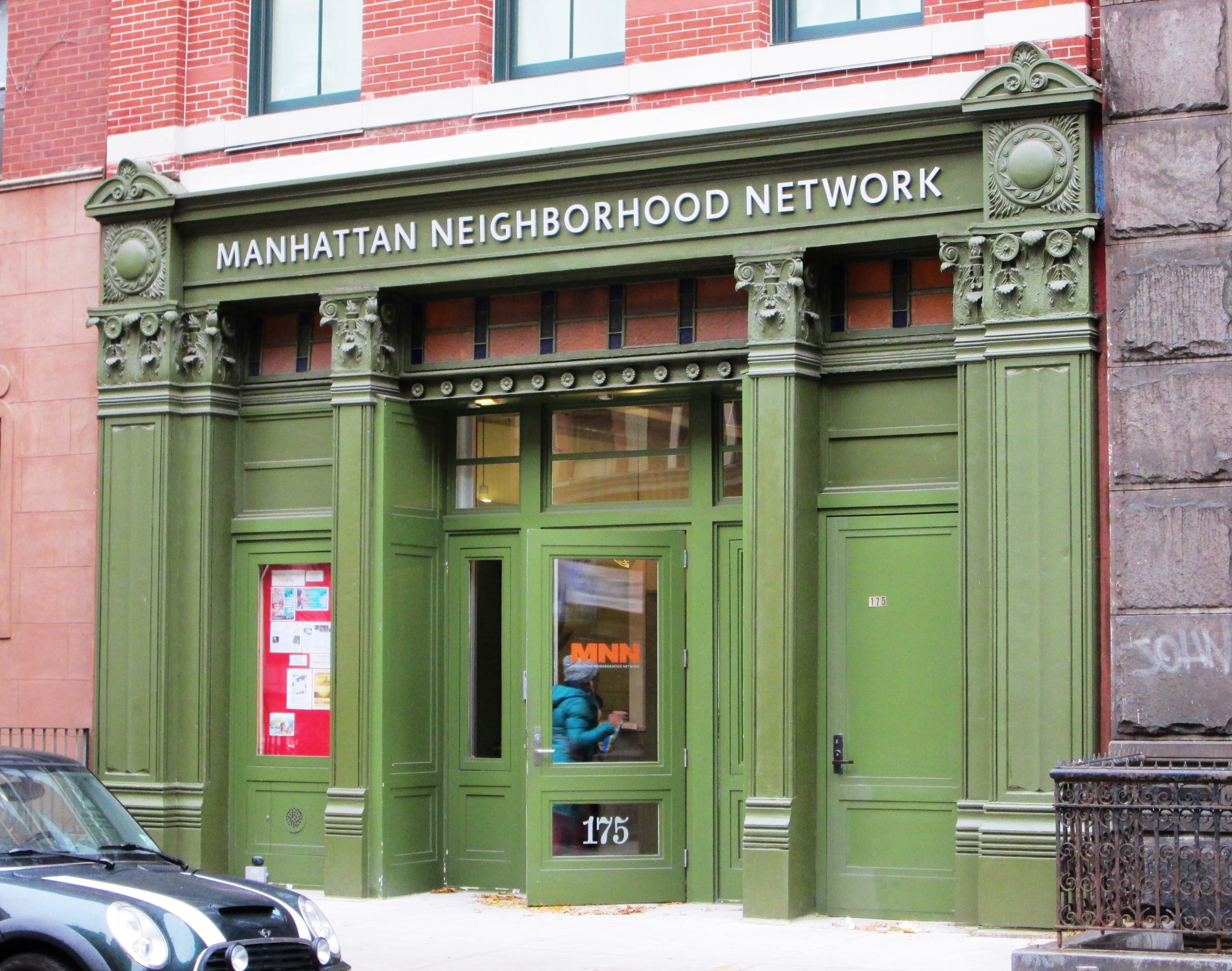
MNN El Barrio Firehouse Community Media Center, which opened in East Harlem in 2012.

The Manhattan Neighborhood Network was founded in 1992 as a successor of the Channel J. Its studios were initially in a rented facility on 23rd Street. It later moved to West 59th Street.

In 2002 MNN had two satellite facilities: one on the Lower East Side, a partnership with the Downtown Community Television Center, one of the city's oldest community media centers; and another in East Harlem, a partnership with PRdream.com, also known as MediaNoche. The relationship with PRdream/MediaNoche ended in 2006.

In 2012, MNN opened the MNN El Barrio Firehouse Community Media Center in East Harlem. In March 2023, MNN moved its other location from 537 West 59th Street to a brand new facility at 509 West 38th Street.

MNN instituted one of the first community media grant programs in the country, providing video equipment, staff and training for community groups in New York City. This program helped groups to document some of the most historically significant issues of the 1990s and 2000s, including AIDS activism, labor organizing, police brutality, community gardens, immigrants' rights and LGBT rights. MNN ended the grants program in 2008, which triggered a series of events that resulted in the 2019 US Supreme Court case Manhattan Community Access Corp. v. Halleck.

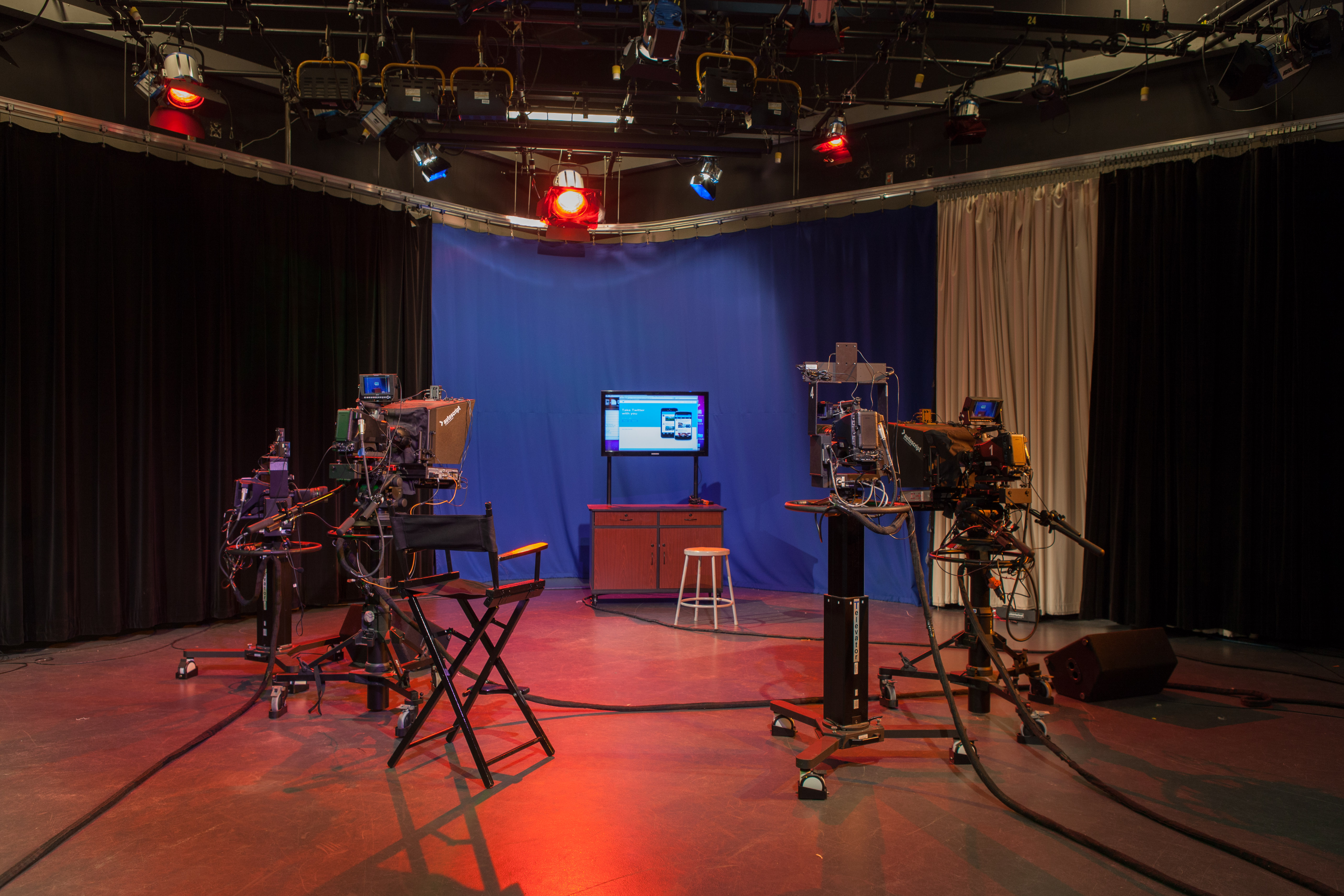
MNN has seven studios for community use: a 4-camera open studio, two 3-camera closed studios, and 4 all-in-one "Express" studios.

MNN reaches approximately 500,000 cable subscribers throughout Manhattan. It is currently funded as part of a community benefit agreement with Time Warner Cable, Verizon and RCN Corporation, which is tied to their franchise agreements with New York City.

The network operates across five channels: MNN1 Community, which chronicles topics from local elections, New York politics and community issues; MNN2 Lifestyle, which explores entertainment about everyday interests from New Yorkers; MNN3 Spirit, which covers spiritual, religious and philosophical matters for various faiths; MNN4 Culture, which broadcasts multilingual arts-oriented programming from the point of view of Manhattan's diverse population; and MNN5 HD, a high-definition channel. MNN airs more than 10,000 hours of original local programming each year and broadcasts in more than 40 languages. Several MNN programs have been the recipient of Community Media awards, which are given out each year by the Alliance for Community Media.

MNN also produces the cable and digital channel NYXT.nyc, which debuted online and on the air in 2016. Presented in partnership with more than 60 community-based organizations, NYXT.nyc shines a spotlight on organizations that are working to connect people and build neighborhoods.

== See also ==
- Public-access television
- Culture of New York City
