= My Girlfriend's Boyfriend =

My Girlfriend's Boyfriend may refer to:

- My Girlfriend's Boyfriend (1987 film), or Boyfriends and Girlfriends, a French romantic comedy-drama
- My Girlfriend's Boyfriend (1998 film), an American screwball comedy
- My Girlfriend's Boyfriend (2010 film), an American romantic comedy
- Mike Birbiglia: My Girlfriend's Boyfriend, a 2013 film recording of a 2011 one-man show by Mike Birbiglia
