= Marigny Opera House =

Opera house and former Catholic church in New Orleans

- Church of the Arts
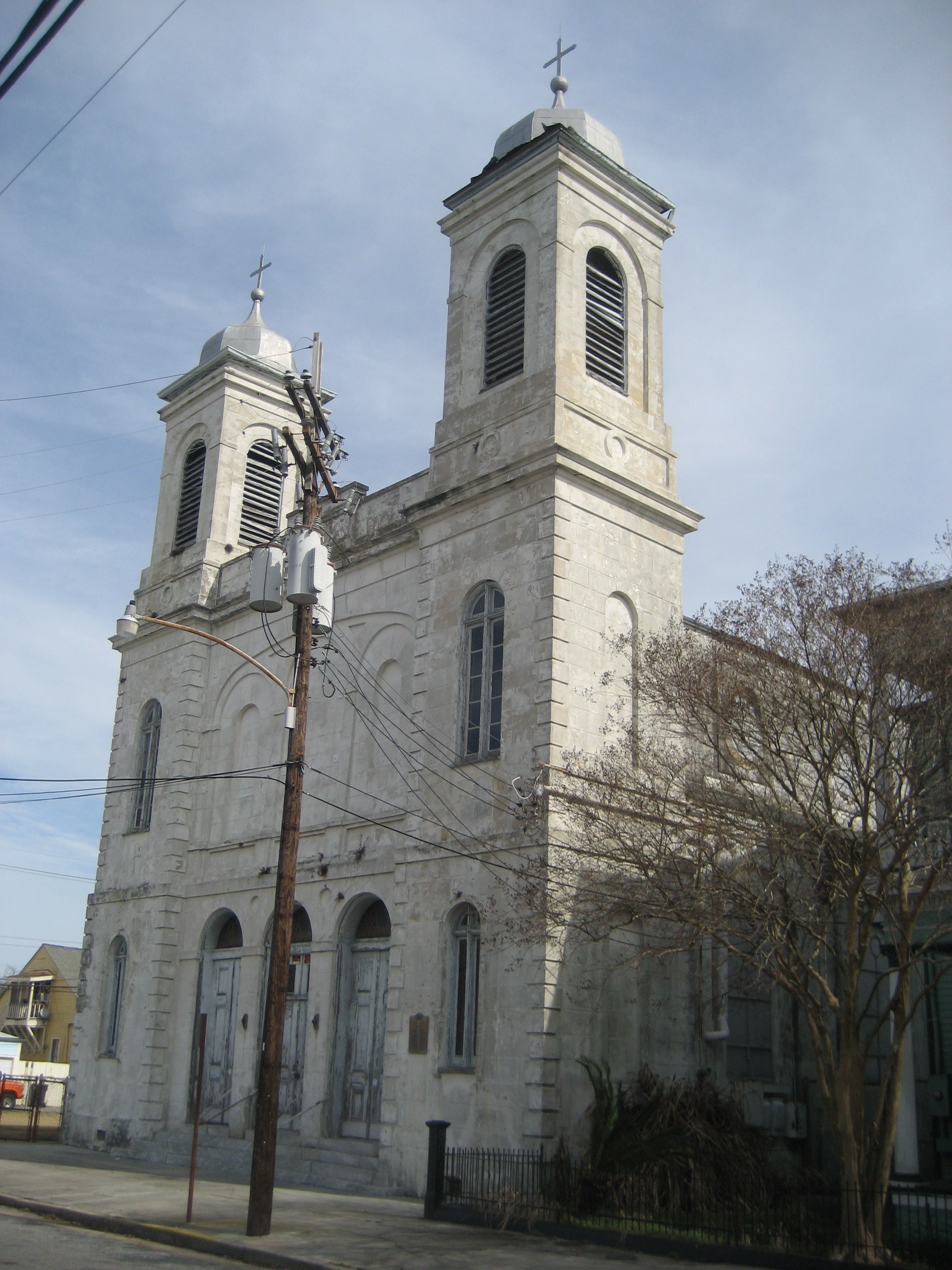
- Interactive map of Marigny Opera House
- Address: 725 Saint Ferdinand Street; New Orleans, Louisiana; United States
- Coordinates: 29.96503°N 90.04913°W
- Type: Performing arts center

Construction
- Opened: 1853
- Closed: 1997
- Reopened: 2011
- Years active: 2011 - present
- Architect: Theodore Giraud

Website
- marignyoperahouse.org

Marigny Opera House, also known as the Church of the Arts, is an opera house and performing arts center in Faubourg Marigny, New Orleans, Louisiana. The Marigny was originally a Catholic parish church known as Holy Trinity Catholic Church. It was closed by the Archdiocese of New Orleans in 1997.

After adaptation and renovation, it was reopened as an opera house in 2011. A resident professional contemporary ballet company, Marigny Opera Ballet, was founded there in 2014. OperaCréole, founded in 2008, also produces works there.

== History ==
=== Holy Trinity Church ===
In 1847 Catholic priest J.M. Masquelet purchased a property on the corner of Dauphine Street and St. Ferdinand Street in Faubourg Marigny for $3,000 to build a parish church. He commissioned the architect Theodore Giraud to design the church building. The following year the structure was dedicated as Holy Trinity Church, a Catholic church serving the German immigrant community of the neighborhood.

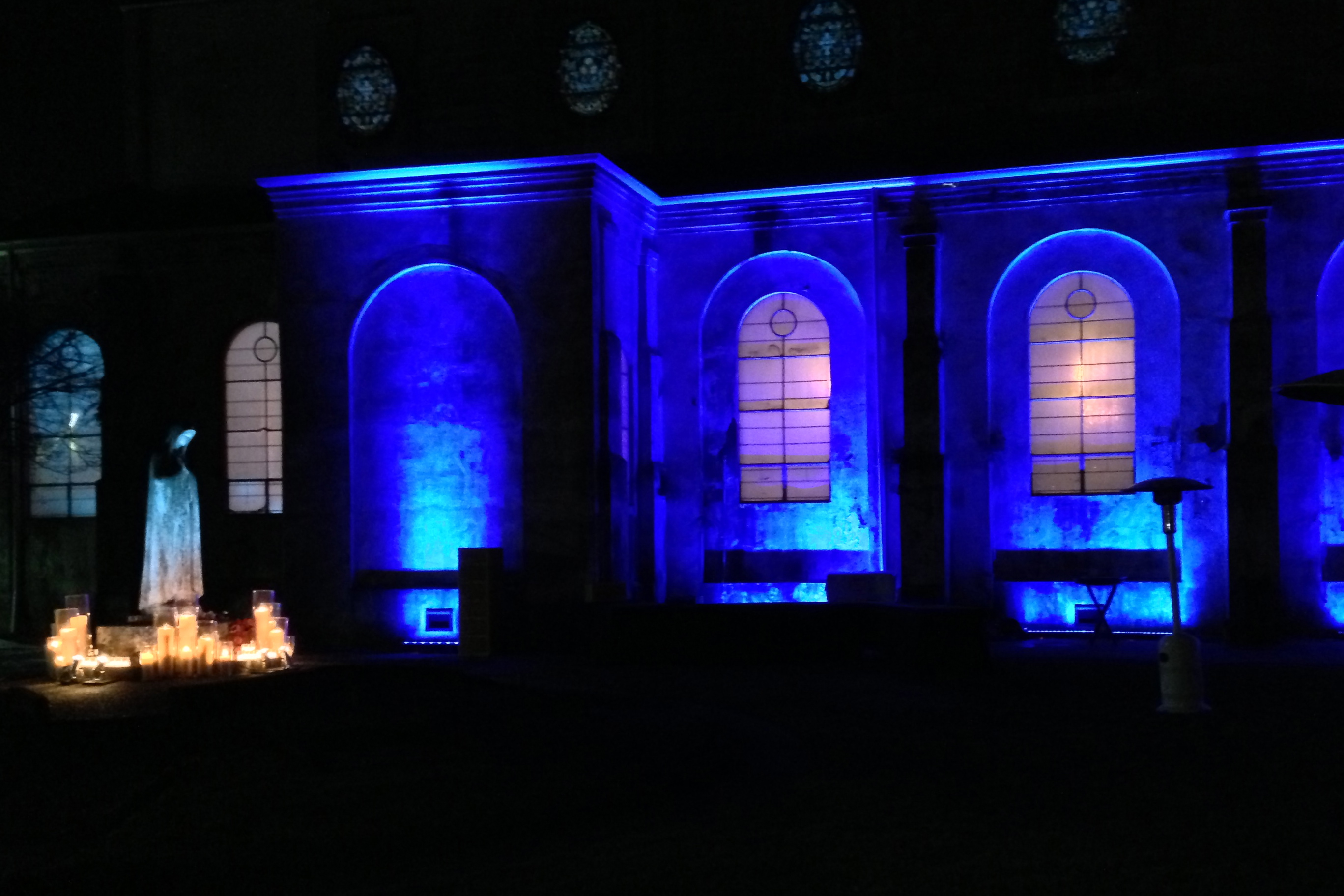
Mary garden at Holy Trinity.

The original church was destroyed in a fire in 1851. In 1853 a new church is built under the direction of Fr. Matthias Schifferer. In the late 1860s New Orleans suffered from an outbreak of yellow fever, which killed two of the church's priests. In 1873 a chapel was built and dedicated to St. Roch, whom the congregation credited with ending the outbreak. In 1876 the parish established St. Roch Cemetery at the site.

Holy Trinity opened a Catholic School in 1871, run by sisters of the Benedictine order. The school became a free parochial school in 1910. The church was damaged by Hurricane Betsy in 1965.

In 1997 Holy Trinity was closed and deconsecrated by the Archdiocese of New Orleans. In 1999 the Archdioceses removed the stained glass windows and organ from the building. The structure was badly damaged by flooding from Hurricane Katrina in 2005.

=== Marigny Opera House ===
In 2011 the church building was bought by Dave Hulbert and Scott King, who converted it into a performing arts venue, and renamed it as the Marigny Opera House. In 2011 it hosted the New Orleans Fringe Festival.

The Marigny Opera House was officially opened on January 2, 2012. It is supported by the Marigny Opera House Foundation, a non-profit organization. The Marigny is used as a performance venue for dance, theatre, opera, jazz, and classical music performances.

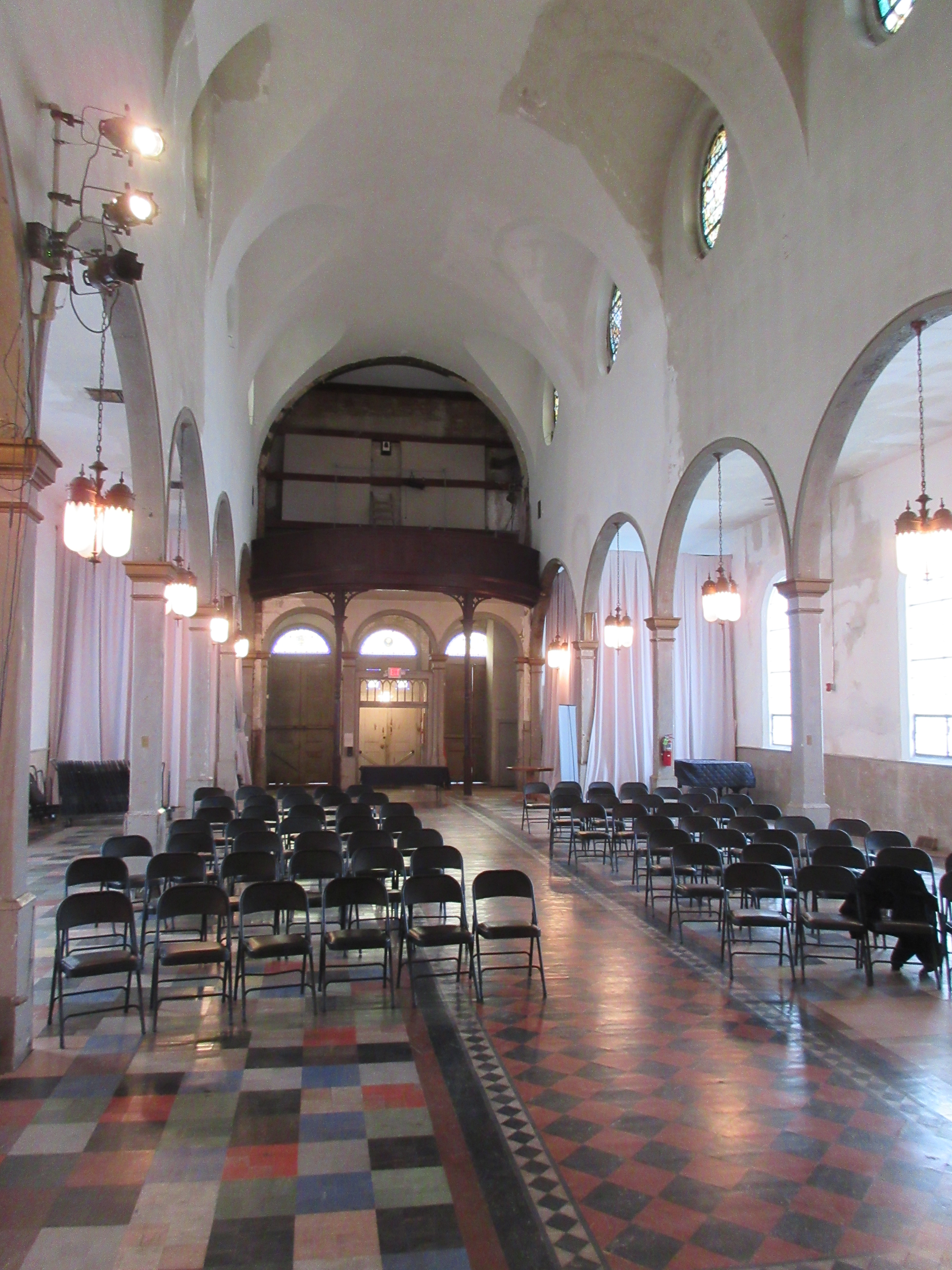
The interior of the opera house in 2016.

In 2013, Depeche Mode used the Marigny as a set for the music video for their song "Heaven".

In 2014, the Marigny Opera Ballet, a resident professional contemporary ballet company, formed at the Marigny.

The Marigny also operates as a wedding venue. Celebrity weddings, including the weddings of Solange Knowles and Alan Ferguson and of Lake Bell and Scott Campbell, have been celebrated at the Marigny.
