= God's Country (2022 film) =

2022 film directed by Julian Higgins

- Release poster
- Directed by: Julian Higgins
- Screenplay by: Julian Higgins; Shaye Ogbonna
- Based on: "Winter Light" by James Lee Burke
- Produced by: Julian Higgins; Miranda Bailey; Halee Bernard; Amanda Marshall
- Starring: Thandiwe Newton; Jeremy Bobb; Joris Jarsky; Jefferson White; Kai Lennox; Tanaya Beatty
- Cinematography: Andrew Wheeler
- Edited by: Justin LaForge
- Music by: DeAndre James Allen-Toole
- Production companies: Cold Iron Pictures; The Film Arcade
- Distributed by: IFC Films
- Release dates: January 23, 2022 (Sundance); September 16, 2022 (United States)
- Running time: 102 minutes
- Country: United States
- Language: English
- Box office: $493,679

God's Country is a 2022 American thriller film co-written and directed by Julian Higgins, based on the short story "Winter Light" by James Lee Burke. The film stars Thandiwe Newton, Jeremy Bobb, Joris Jarsky, Jefferson White, Kai Lennox, and Tanaya Beatty. It had its world premiere in the Premieres section of the 38th Sundance Film Festival on January 23, 2022, and was released theatrically in United States on September 16, 2022.

== Synopsis ==
While a police officer in New Orleans, the events of Hurricane Katrina convince Sandra to move with her mother to a remote and cold region of Montana, where she becomes a university professor. Once her mother dies, Sandra is left alone between the power dynamics of her college and the town. But it is a confrontation with two hunters trespassing on her property that ultimately pushes her own pain and growing anger to their limits. Limits where individual freedom and legal recourse meet American justice.

== Cast ==
- Thandiwe Newton as Sandra
- Jeremy Bobb as Wolf
- Joris Jarsky as Nathan
- Kai Lennox as Arthur
- Jefferson White as Samuel
- Tanaya Beatty as Gretchen
- Dan Gravage as the funeral director

== Release ==
The film had its world premiere in the Premieres section of the 38th Sundance Film Festival on January 23, 2022, at the Eccles Center in Park City, Utah. It was released theatrically in the United States by IFC Films on September 16, 2022, and on VOD by IFC Video on October 4, 2022.

== Reception ==
=== Box office ===
God's Country grossed $493,679 in the United States.

=== Critical response ===
On the review aggregator website Rotten Tomatoes, 88% of 82 critics' reviews are positive, with an average rating of 7.4/10. The website's consensus reads: "Led by an outstanding Thandiwe Newton, God's Country rewards patient viewers with a slow-burning but ultimately explosive story of inexorable conflict." Metacritic, which uses a weighted average, assigned the film a score of 77 out of 100, based on 15 critics, indicating "generally favorable" reviews.

Brian Tallerico of RogerEbert.com said, "It's a film that understands both form and content, merging the two in a story that feels less like a piece of suspenseful entertainment and more like a warning." Dennis Harvey of Variety said, "God's Country (the title of which hints at another running theme of faith and doubt) is admirable for avoiding caricature within conflict, and granting dramatic personae the depth to hesitate before giving in to their angriest first impulses."
