= Being Frank =

- Theatrical release poster
- Directed by: Miranda Bailey
- Written by: Glen Lakin
- Produced by: Karen Kehela Sherwood; Amanda Marshall; Miranda Bailey
- Starring: Jim Gaffigan; Logan Miller; Samantha Mathis; Alex Karpovsky; Anna Gunn
- Cinematography: Yaron Scharf
- Edited by: Jeffrey M. Werner
- Music by: Craig Richey
- Production companies: Cold Iron Pictures; Imagine Entertainment
- Distributed by: The Film Arcade
- Release dates: March 11, 2018 (SXSW); June 14, 2019 (United States)
- Running time: 110 minutes
- Country: United States
- Language: English
- Box office: $67,343

Being Frank is a 2018 American comedy film directed by Miranda Bailey and written by Glen Lakin. The film stars Jim Gaffigan, Logan Miller, Samantha Mathis, Alex Karpovsky and Anna Gunn. The film was released on June 14, 2019, by The Film Arcade. The film received mixed reviews after its release.

== Plot ==
Philip, a 17-year-old senior has dreams of being a musician, but his father sees his life much differently. Frank wants Philip to complete a summer internship at the family ketchup factory before attending a state college, despite the fact that Philip wants to attend New York University. One night at dinner Philip asks his mother, Laura, if he can attend the Starling Festival at the lake, since it is his final Spring Break of his high school life. Despite attending the festival with her husband almost two decades prior, she says no, much to Philip's dismay.

Philip is accepted into NYU, and Frank abruptly shuts him down, without a conversation. This greatly upsets Philip, so he decides to sneak out of the house the next day after his father has left for his long trip to Japan and his mother and sister, Lib have gone to a PETA event. Lewis, Philip's friend, picks up Philip and they head off to the lake. Although Philip thinks they're going to be staying in a lake side cabin, they end up staying at Lewis' stoner uncle, Ross', shanty apartment.

Philip and Lewis head to the pool, and while Philip is busy admiring his high school crush Allison, Frank shows up at the pool. The boys scramble to hide from Frank as he walks up to and hugs the young waitress. Worried, the two boys follow Frank and the waitress to a house and sneak to the backyard where Philip is shocked again. This time he hugs an older woman and then a younger man. The three people turn out to be Bonnie, Kelly and Eddie (Frank's other wife, daughter and son, respectively). Philip is devastated and he and Lewis head back to Ross' apartment. The next day, Philip returns to Frank's other house and introduces himself as Richie's son; Richie being the name Frank has used to keep his wives off the trail. He is welcomed in with open arms.

Frank "returns" home from his "trip" to Japan and is shocked when he sees Philip in the wrong house. Later in the evening, Philip blackmails Frank into paying for his NYU tuition and Frank obliges, writing him a check. Philip spends the weekend with Frank's other family, even attending a party with Kelly and bonding with Eddie about their father (unbeknownst to Eddie). Not returning home on Monday, Laura gets worried and calls Lewis' mother to inquire the whereabouts of her son and learns that they went to the lake. Laura and Lib go to the lake the next day.

Lewis warns Philip and Frank about the impending arrival of Laura and Lib, but it's too late. Frank makes up a lie about not needing to be in Japan and not telling his wife why. The family decides to rent a cabin at the lake for the festival. The morning of the Starling Festival, Frank wakes up at Bonnie's cabin, but also needs to be at Laura's cabin at the same time so he goes for a "jog" but he actually flat out runs there. Eddie volunteers to go with, but Frank says he wants to be alone, leaving Eddie feeling confused and rejected.

Frank's arrival at Laura's rental confuses her and Lib, as he is completely soaked from the sweat. Philip sends the girls to the festival, not knowing that Frank had already sent Bonnie, Kelly and Eddie down to the festival as well. Philip and Frank are dumbfounded, trying to figure out how to keep the two families from bumping into each other. Ironically, Ross appears with a powerboat at that exact moment and gets them to the festival in a fraction of the time.

Philip and Frank arrive and split up to distract the two wives. Before Philip can reach his mother, he is cut off by Kelly, who wants to reveal her feelings for him. Kelly won't listen to Philip and leans in to kiss him, as Frank stops it before she is able to. Frank then reveals the whole truth about his affair. Thinking he can distract Laura and Bonnie from being too upset at his father, Philip thinks of an off-hand remark Frank said about heaving himself into oncoming traffic. Before a car strikes Philip, Frank pushes him out of the way. Doing this, though, put them in front of another car going in the other direction, driven by Stan and Marcy Kempler (two friends of Bonnie and Frank). Not knowing if they killed Philip and Frank, they speed away.

Philip and Frank end up in the hospital. Philip is released after only sustaining bumps and bruises, but Frank is admitted having suffered broken ribs and a broken leg, with a few minor injuries. Laura leaves the hospital without seeing Frank, removing her wedding ring in the car, signifying the end of her marriage. Bonnie and all four children enter Frank's hospital room and confront him about the pain he's caused. Everyone leaves the room, with Philip trailing, having finally connected to his father in a way he always desired.

Five months later, Philip is moving into his dorm room when Kelly comes to see him, letting him know they'll be neighbors. Frank and Bonnie end up sharing an elevator, with Bonnie stating she'd rather he "take the window". Frank enters Philip's room and Kelly leaves immediately, not ready to mend her relationship with her father. Frank then presents his father's guitar to Philip, explaining that the guitar never really belonged to him. This also serves as a blessing for Philip to pursue music as a career. Philip and Frank embrace in a hug and then Frank leaves, only to linger outside the dorm room and listen to Philip play his new guitar.

== Cast ==
- Logan Miller as Philip Hansen
- Jim Gaffigan as Frank Hansen
- Samantha Mathis as Bonnie
- Alex Karpovsky as Ross
- Anna Gunn as Laura Hansen
- Danielle Campbell as Allison
- Isabelle Phillips as Kelly
- Emerson Tate Alexander as Lib Hansen
- Daniel Rashid as Lewis
- Gage Polchlopek as Eddie
- Thomas Mulzac as Troy
- Hayes MacArthur as Stan Kempler
- Michelle Hurd as Marcy Kempler

== Release and reception ==
The film premiered at South by Southwest on March 11, 2018. The film was released on June 14, 2019, by The Film Arcade.

On review aggregator Rotten Tomatoes, the film holds an approval rating of 34% based on 41 reviews, with an average rating of 5.7/10. The website's critics' consensus reads: "Being Frank suggests Jim Gaffigan may have a real future as a dramatic actor -- if only he's offered projects that don't suffer from so much wasted potential."

Sheila O'Malley of RogerEbert.com gave the film two and a half out of four stars and wrote, "When Being Frank goes squishy and sentimental, it loses its nerve."
