= Miranda Bailey (producer) =

American film producer (born 1977)

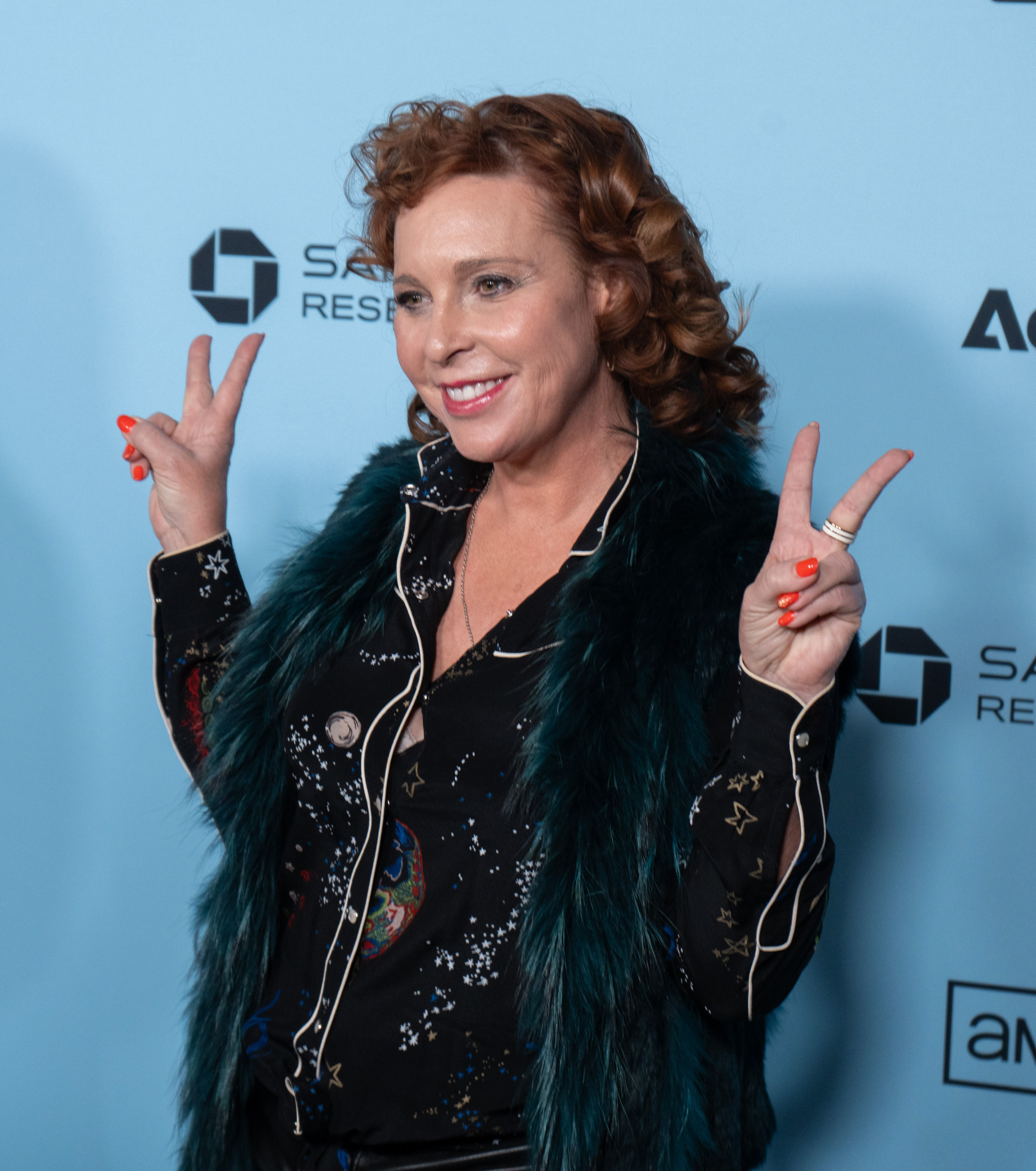
- Bailey in 2025
- Born: January 30, 1977 (age 49); Vail, Colorado
- Occupation: Producer
- Years active: 1999–present

Miranda Bailey (born January 30, 1977) is an American film producer, director, and actress. Bailey has produced The Diary of a Teenage Girl (2015), Swiss Army Man (2016), Don't Think Twice (2016), God's Country (2022), The Unknown Country (2022), June Zero (2022), Jazzy (2024), and By Design (2025). She has additionally directed The Pathological Optimist (2017), and Being Frank (2018).

== Early life ==
Bailey grew up in Vail, Colorado. She attended Skidmore College.

== Career ==
Bailey founded the production company Cold Iron Pictures, and has produced The Diary of a Teenage Girl (2015), for which she won an Independent Spirit Award for Best First Feature. She also produced Swiss Army Man (2016), Don't Think Twice (2016), God's Country (2022), The Unknown Country (2022), June Zero (2022), Jazzy (2024), and By Design (2025).

Apart from producing, Bailey directed the documentary features Greenlit focusing on environmental effects from film production, and The Pathological Optimist a documentary revolving around anti-vaccine activist Andrew Wakefield. In 2018, she directed the narrative feature Being Frank starring Jim Gaffigan.

In March 2018, Bailey announced The Cherry Picks, a website dedicated to film criticism by female critics. The site launched in April 2019.
