= Tim Palen =

American photographer (born 1962)

- Education: University of Colorado & Art Center College of Design
- Known for: Graphic design, Photography

Tim Palen (born 1962) is an American photographer and motion picture marketing executive. During his 17 years at Lionsgate he became known for using his own photography as part of the promotional campaigns for films. After Palen left Lionsgate in 2019 to found his own company, Barnyard Projects, he and Tyler Perry announced a joint venture, Peachtree and Vine, a production company located in Atlanta and Los Angeles.

As a photographer, Palen has received multiple Clio and Key Art awards for his work, and published three books of his photographs.

== Early life and influences ==
Palen was the middle of five children and the only boy in a practicing Catholic family. His mother worked as an administrative assistant for a commercial cheesemaker, and his father ran a local Texaco station. Growing up in Northglenn, Colorado, Palen says he knew at an early age that he was attracted to other boys.

Palen became interested in graphic art and design during high school, and studied advertising and journalism at the University of Colorado before leaving school to move to Los Angeles, where he first met his partner, Abel Villareal. Palen also studied some photography at the Art Center College of Design in Pasadena, California, although he says he is largely self-taught. Palen says his photography has been influenced by Mark Kessell, David LaChepelle, and Joel Peter Witkin.

== Early career ==
Palen worked as a creative director at Sony Pictures Home Entertainment (formerly Columbia TriStar Home Video). There he worked on VHS cassette packaging, treating the sleeve "as if it were a merchandising tool in and of itself". As executive director of creative advertising in 1998, Palen regularly updated the company's website with backgrounds from upcoming films to help drive VHS sales.

In July 1999, Destination Films hired Palen as vice president of creative advertising. His outdoor advertising campaign to sell Destination's horror movie Bats included 3-D paintings of bats in flight across Los Angeles buses. The bus ads print work earned Hollywood Reporter's Key Art best of show honors in 2000.

== Career at Lionsgate ==
At the end of 2001, Palen left Destination Films to become vice president of theatrical marketing at independent studio Lionsgate Films, then called Lions Gate Films. Palen oversaw promotional campaigns for films such as Monster's Ball, Fahrenheit 9/11 — Lionsgate's first property to gross more than a hundred million dollars — and Saw. He was promoted to executive vice president of theatrical marketing in November 2004.

In 2005, Lions Gate rebranded as Lionsgate and Palen was promoted to co-president of film marketing alongside Sarah Greenberg. In December 2010, Lionsgate announced that Sarah Greenberg was leaving her post as co-president of marketing for personal reasons, leaving Palen as the sole president of film marketing. In spring of 2014, Lionsgate announced it would merge the two separate marketing divisions it had operated since its 2012 merger with Summit Entertainment, with Palen in charge.

In June 2015, Lionsgate promoted Palen to chief brand officer and president of worldwide marketing. Lionsgate CEO Jon Feltheimer said Palen had "played a lead role in building the Lionsgate Corporate Brand since the early days of the studio."

In June 2018, Palen announced he was stepping down from his role as chief brand officer at Lionsgate in favor of a production executive role as of January 2019. Palen also announced he was forming his own production company, Barnyard Projects.

=== Notable promotional campaigns ===
Palen's first campaign at Lionsgate was for Monster's Ball. Focus was placed on controversial subjects, such as the interracial love story between two characters played by Halle Berry and Billy Bob Thornton, with TV ads showing the couple in bed that even ran in the American South.

The first Lionsgate campaign poster Palen photographed himself was for the 2003 movie, Wonderland. He wanted the poster to look like a Rolling Stone cover, so he and a friend bought some props and took a picture as a starting concept. The director liked the image and used it as the promotional poster for the film.

A long-running promotional campaign for the Saw franchise started with a suggestion by marketing vice president Erica Schimick, who jokingly suggested a blood drive to increase visibility of the film. Palen and Sarah Greenberg (then the vice president of publicity) thought it was a good idea, and Palen photographed Schimick posing as a nurse with blood-smeared cleavage for the poster. In preparation for the release of Saw II Palen expanded the blood drive to ten states. For Saw III Palen expanded the blood drive even further, and asked the film's star Tobin Bell to donate his own blood to mix with the ink for the poster. Although Lionsgate had advertised the 2010 installment of the Saw franchise as the final chapter, the studio revived the series in 2017 with the October release of Jigsaw. Palen revisited the Saw blood drives as well, but this time challenging the American Red Cross over its long-standing and controversial restrictions requiring men who have sex with other men to abstain from sexual relations for at least a year before giving blood, rules arising from concerns about Human Immunodeficiency Virus. The campaign was called "All Types Welcome", and featured social media celebrities with large LGBTQ fanbases.

Palen was nearly censored by the Motion Picture Association (MPAA), the body responsible for regulating promotional materials for motion pictures in North America, for the promotional posters of Hostel: Part II. For this poster, Palen had taken photographs of boar meat, which when viewed zoomed in looked like human intestines; he would later have to send the MPAA receipts from the butcher shop to prove that the "intestines" were not human. Many of Palen's most provocative campaign materials were released online to avoid sanctions by the MPAA. One such image, Saw: Severed Hand won the Hollywood Reporter's 34th annual Key Art award in the international film poster category.

Despite the successes and association with gore, Palen said he enjoyed working on a diverse range of films, as work at a big studio "can be a little redundant."

To promote Tyler Perry's For Colored Girls, Palen shot eight 35mm portraits of the film's ensemble: Janet Jackson, Thandie Newton, Kerry Washington, Loretta Devine, Whoopi Goldberg, Anika Noni Rose, Kimberly Elise, and Phylicia Rashad. Palen used the portraits in the poster campaign and trailer. A gallery exhibition of the photos, Living Portraits, opened at the Lehman Maupin Gallery in New York City for a week in October 2010, with Janet Jackson hosting. Palen had previously directed Jackson's music video for her song "Nothing" from Perry's Why Did I Get Married Too?.

In initial marketing for The Hunger Games, Palen focused on encouraging more people to read the books in order to increase turnout at the box office. Palen also proposed not including any scenes from the games in the marketing campaign, despite those scenes comprised more than half of the movie, to avoid potential perception issues. For the 2012 release of the sequel The Hunger Games: Catching Fire, the campaign created a mock online fashion magazine called Capitol Couture, alluding to the capital city of the fictional nation Panem, and featuring Palen's own photographs of the film's characters, modeling what Variety calls "elaborate" looks, alongside colorful, stylized advertisements for fictional products from Panem. The final two films were treated as one film in order to avoid a new campaign for each half of the story. Palen and his team developed another portal to the fictional world with CapitolTV, a faux state media outlet for the government of Panem streamed on YouTube and other platforms, and featuring YouTube stars Justine Ezarik, Rob Czar, and Corinne Leigh among others. The team also launched "District Heroes", an outdoor and online promotion that featured an amputee underwear model and the reigning Mr. L.A. Leather.

== Post-Lionsgate career ==
In addition to his new company, Barnyard Projects, Palen and Tyler Perry announced in September 2019 they were entering a non-exclusive joint venture to form a new production company called Peachtree and Vine, a reference to famous streets in Perry's hometown of Atlanta and Palen's home in Los Angeles.

== Photography ==
In 2007, Palen published Guts, a coffee table book compiling some of his photography associated with the marketing of four horror films: Bug, High Tension, Hostel, and Saw. Interspersed between the photos are letters from the MPAA and American Red Cross related to their respective disagreements with Palen.

In August 2011, Palen published The Men of Warrior featuring his photographs of Tom Hardy, Joel Edgerton, and other cast members as they appeared in the film Warrior.

In June 2015, Palen published Tim Palen: Photography from The Hunger Games, featuring photographs of the series' casts. Later that year, the photographs were exhibited at the Leica Gallery in West Hollywood.

== Awards and honors ==
Palen has received multiple awards at the Clios for images and trailers related to Nurse 3D, the Hunger Games franchise, Deepwater Horizon, and John Wick: Chapter 2.

Palen's has received multiple Key Art Awards for work on films such as Bats and the Saw franchise.
