= Nurse 3D =

2013 film by Doug Aarniokoski

- Theatrical release poster
- Directed by: Doug Aarniokoski
- Screenplay by: David Loughery; Doug Aarniokoski
- Produced by: Marc Bienstock
- Starring: Paz de la Huerta; Katrina Bowden; Corbin Bleu
- Cinematography: Boris Mojsovski
- Edited by: Andrew Coutts
- Music by: Anton Sanko
- Production company: Lionsgate
- Distributed by: The Film Arcade
- Release dates: September 28, 2013 (Zurich Film Festival); February 7, 2014 (United States)
- Running time: 84 minutes
- Country: United States
- Language: English
- Budget: $10 million
- Box office: $706,617

Nurse 3D is a 2013 American horror film directed by Doug Aarniokoski, written by Aarniokoski and David Loughery. It stars Paz de la Huerta, Katrina Bowden, and Corbin Bleu. De la Huerta plays Abby Russell, a nurse and serial killer who targets men who cheat on their partners, and who develops an unhealthy relationship with fellow nurse Danni (Bowden).

Production took place from September to October 2011. Nurse 3D was released in limited theaters by The Film Arcade and by Lionsgate through video on demand on February 7, 2014.

== Plot ==
Abby Russell works as a nurse in Manhattan but is secretly a serial killer who targets unfaithful men. She murders a man by severing his femoral artery and then throws him off of the roof of a nightclub. The following day, she attends the graduation ceremony of nurse Danni Rodgers, a student she mentored, and meets Danni's mother and stepfather, Larry Cook. However, Danni is ill-prepared for her first day of duty, and her superior, Dr. Morris, berates her for not responding quickly to an emergency. Abby views the situation with disgust, as she knows that Dr. Morris is a sadist who takes pleasure in tormenting new nurses.

Abby is irritated when Danni chooses to call her paramedic boyfriend, Steve, for support. She is pleased when Danni's call to Steve ends badly due to a fight over Danni's refusal to move in with him. She explains to Abby that she is distrustful of her stepfather Larry, which is justified when Abby and Danni witness him having an affair while en route to a nightclub. Unknown to Danni, Abby spikes her drink with a date rape drug, enabling Abby to get Danni to have sex with both her and random strangers. The next day, Danni wakes to find herself in Abby's apartment and leaves. Afterwards, Abby downloads several photos that she had taken from the previous night before leaving to see a psychiatrist, revealed to be Larry.

Abby seduces Larry, alluding to her past history with her father. Confirming that he is unfaithful to Danni's mother, Abby shows up at his place of work and convinces him to give her a ride, during which she paralyzes him with vecuronium bromide, resulting in a car accident. After hearing of her stepfather's death, Danni seeks solace from Abby, only for Abby to grow angry when Danni says she will move in with Steve. Abby comments that she hopes that Larry's genitals were severed in the car crash. Danni is skeptical of Abby as she had not informed her of the crash. Abby slowly convinces Detective John Rogan that Danni is mentally unstable and obsessed with her.

The next day, Abby runs into Rachel Adams, a new human resources employee who remarks that Abby resembles a girl she knew that was sent to a mental institution. Abby invites Rachel out for drinks and takes the opportunity to harass Danni by calling her via Skype and showing Danni a video of Abby injecting chemicals into Rachel. Danni tries to go to the police, only for Detective Rogan to dismiss her claims as evidence of her trying to hurt Abby in retaliation. He uses the photographs Abby took as proof to this effect, which Steve sees as a result of Danni summoning him to the police station for support. This prompts an argument between the two, and Steve leaves. Danni tries to approach Dr. Morris for help, only for him to use this as an opportunity to blackmail Abby into having sex with him. Abby pretends to agree to this arrangement but uses the opportunity to dismember and murder him. That same night Abby also murders Rachel.

Danni goes to the mental institution referred to by Rachel. She learns about Sarah Price, a little girl who killed her father after learning he was having an affair and witnessing him beating her mother. Danni discovers that a nurse named Abigail Russell at the institution took in Sarah. Danni realizes that Abby is Sarah and has assumed her identity. Danni tries to call Rachel to warn her about Abby, only to find that Rachel's phone is in her car. She receives a call from Abby who was just having sex with a cop, who implies that she will kill Steve similarly to Rachel.

Danni rushes to the hospital, where she and Abby begin to fight. The staff tries to intervene, only for Abby to set off on a killing spree and lock herself into a lab. Danni and Steve pursue her, and Abby stabs Steve in the neck. Abby rushes home, where Detective Rogan confronts her. Noticing her neighbor Jared, Abby pretends that Rogan is trying to rob her. Her neighbor then bludgeons the detective with a bat, killing him instantly. Her neighbor is horrified to discover that Rogan is a cop, but Abby convinces him to hide the body, saying that Rogan was corrupt, and Jared would be badly treated since he is now a cop killer. Abby then assumes the identity of human resources employee Rachel Adams.

== Cast ==
- Paz de la Huerta as Abby Russell
- Katrina Bowden as Danni Rodgers
- Judd Nelson as Dr. Robert Morris
- Corbin Bleu as Steve
- Boris Kodjoe as Detective Rogan
- Melanie Scrofano as Rachel Adams
- Niecy Nash as Regina
- Martin Donovan as Larry Cook
- Brittany Adams as young nurse
- Kathleen Turner as head nurse
- Michael Eklund as Richie
- Kerr Hewitt as an orderly
- Joe MacLeod as an EMT
- Michael Therriault as an anatomy professor

== Production ==
In April 2011, Doug Aarniokoski signed on to direct The Nurse 3D, produced by Lionsgate. Zaldy was the costume designer. The film is inspired by the photography of (then) Lionsgate's chief marketing officer Tim Palen. In July 2011, Paz de la Huerta signed on to star as Abby Russell. Corbin Bleu was brought on in August 2011. Principal photography took place in Toronto, Ontario from September 6 to October 21, 2011.

=== Legal issues ===
During filming, de la Huerta was struck by a stunt ambulance which was supposed to drive by her. The production later paid her $73,000 in workers' compensation for her injuries.

In 2015, de la Huerta sued the film's producers for $55 million, claiming that an overdub for the film's voiceover narration by another actress (her lawsuit quoted a critic as calling it a "monotone performance") had infringed on her rights and damaged her career. The lawsuit was not successful.

== Release ==
Nurse 3D had its world premiere at the Zurich Film Festival on September 28, 2013. It was released by The Film Arcade in ten American theaters on February 7, 2014, and on video on demand by Lionsgate. This marks the first film to receive a day-to-date release produced by a major studio. Nurse 3D grossed $706,617 in the United States.

=== Home media ===
Lionsgate released Nurse 3D on Blu-ray and DVD on April 7, 2014. A special edition steelbook Blu-ray was released in Germany by UFA DVD.

== Reception ==
On the review aggregator website Rotten Tomatoes, 64% of 25 critics' reviews are positive, with an average rating of 5.9/10. Metacritic, which uses a weighted average, assigned the film a score of 29 out of 100, based on seven critics, indicating "generally unfavorable" reviews.

Frank Scheck of The Hollywood Reporter criticized the direction and script writing, "Director Doug Aarniokoski and co-screenwriter David Loughery fail to infuse the overly familiar elements with the necessary dark humor". Neil Genzlinger of The New York Times commented "doesn't have any of the wit that a film like this needs to give it campy coolness". Peter Sobczynski of RogerEbert.com gave the film a positive review rating it two and a half stars writing, "It is ridiculously lurid trash from start to finish and anyone trying to argue otherwise is as crazy as its central character. However, while its aim may be low throughout, it at least comes close to consistently hitting its targets". The Village Voice gave a negative review, opining that it "never truly embrace[d]" its "B-movie trashiness".

Rod Lott from the Oklahoma Gazette called the film "a modern-day exploitation film with first-rate production values". He went on to say, "it looks slick and operates even slicker, and the gorier it got, the more of a ball this viewer had". Shock Till You Drop remarked that while they could understand why people would not like the film, it would have a solid appeal for "Those very special people out there with very special tastes that embrace 'the awful' and know how to have a little bit of fun." Fearnet's Scott Weinberg also echoed this sentiment, saying that the film was "nothing resembling a deep, intellectual, or insightful horror flick" but that it was "however, quite a bit of good, gruesome fun if you enjoy 'body count' horror combined with a basic but serviceable plot yanked straight out of Single White Female."
