= Ashby (film) =

2015 American comedy drama

- Theatrical release poster
- Directed by: Tony McNamara
- Written by: Tony McNamara
- Produced by: Josh Kesselman; Rory Koslow; Kevin McCormick
- Starring: Mickey Rourke; Nat Wolff; Kevin Dunn; Zachary Knighton; Michael Lerner; Emma Roberts; Sarah Silverman
- Cinematography: Christopher Baffa
- Edited by: Matt Friedman
- Music by: Alec Puro
- Production company: Langley Park Productions
- Distributed by: Paramount Home Media Distribution; The Film Arcade
- Release dates: April 19, 2015 (Tribeca Film Festival); September 25, 2015 (United States)
- Running time: 100 minutes
- Country: United States
- Language: English
- Box office: $122,919

Ashby is a 2015 American crime comedy-drama film written and directed by Tony McNamara. The film stars Mickey Rourke, Nat Wolff, Emma Roberts and Sarah Silverman. The film had its world premiere at Tribeca Film Festival on April 19, 2015. The film was released in the United States in a limited release and on video on demand on September 25, 2015, by Paramount Home Media Distribution and The Film Arcade.

== Plot ==
High-school nerd Ed Wallis enters into a friendship with his neighbor, Ashby, a retired CIA assassin who only has a few months to live. The film is a coming of age/approaching death comedy drama.

Ashby initially tells Ed that he is a retired napkin salesman. Ed realizes he's more than that when he finds multiple passports with Ashby's photo, and cupboards full of weapons.

== Cast ==
- Nat Wolff as Ed Wallis
- Mickey Rourke as Ashby Holt
- Emma Roberts as Eloise
- Sarah Silverman as June Wallis
- Adam Aalderks as Valchek
- Michael Lerner as Entwhistle
- Audrey Reid Couch as Hayley
- Kevin Dunn as Coach Burton
- Zachary Knighton as Father Ted
- Steve Coulter as Peter Black
- John Enos III as Coach

== Production ==
In June 2014, a casting call was held for extras. On June 27, 2014, as the production began on the film, more actors joined the film which include Michael Lerner, Kevin Dunn and Zachary Knighton.

=== Filming ===
Set in Virginia, the principal photography on the film began on June 22, 2014, in Charlotte, North Carolina and lasted for five weeks. On June 23, filming took place in Matthews, North Carolina. Almost 500 extras filled the football stadium at South Mecklenburg High School to film game scenes.

=== Music ===
In October 2014, Alec Puro was hired to compose the music for the film.

== Release ==
The film had its world premiere at the Tribeca Film Festival on April 19, 2015. In May 2015, it was announced Paramount Home Media Distribution had acquired distribution rights for North America, United Kingdom, Germany, Latin America, Australia, New Zealand, Benelux, and Switzerland as well as pan Asia pay TV and worldwide airlines. That same day, it was announced the film would receive an on-demand and theatrical release in fall of 2015. Paramount teamed up with The Film Arcade for US theatrical distribution. The film was released in a limited release and through video on demand on September 25, 2015.

== Critical response ==
Ashby received mixed reviews from film critics. On Rotten Tomatoes it has an approval rating of 52%, based on 21 reviews, with an average rating of 5.51/10. On Metacritic, the film holds a rating of 46 out of 100, based on 8 critics, indicating "mixed or average" reviews.

Dennis Harvey of Variety gave the film a mixed review, writing: "Starring Mickey Rourke as a retired CIA assassin turned improbable mentor to Nat Wolff's next-door-neighbor misfit, Ashby is a genre jumble that makes half-baked use of high-school sports, crime comedy, teen romance and other formulae to mildly diverting ends that are never quite convincing or funny enough. Paramount launched a limited theatrical rollout on Sept. 25, simultaneous with on-demand availability, but Aussie tube scribe Tony McNamara's U.S. feature will definitely fare best as a viable if innocuous cable/rental time-filler."

Kate Erbland of The Playlist for IndieWire also gave the film a mixed review, writing: "It's inevitable that Ashby will squish together its two most important plots — Ashby's mysterious quest and Ed's attempts to be a football star — but McNamara attempts to keep the movie ticking right along, and for all its half-cocked plotlines, Ashby is able to maintain a consistently humorous and light tone. Ed and Ashby's worldview is more than a bit skewed, but so is the film's, and it works well enough to keep the film entertaining and bouncy."

== Box office ==
The film was released on video on demand, as well as opening in 15 theaters, the film debuted with a poor weekend total of $4,631, with a per-theater average of $309.
