= Nothing (Janet Jackson song) =

Single by Janet Jackson

from the album Why Did I Get Married Too? (Motion Picture Soundtrack)
- Released: March 23, 2010
- Recorded: 2010
- Genre: R&B
- Length: 3:25 (edit); 4:09 (soundtrack)
- Label: A&M; So So Def
- Songwriters: Janet Jackson; Johntá Austin; Bryan-Michael Cox; Jermaine Dupri
- Producers: Janet Jackson; Jermaine Dupri; Bryan-Michael Cox

Janet Jackson singles chronology
"Make Me" (2009)	"Nothing" (2010)	"No Sleeep" (2015)

Music video
- "Nothing" on YouTube

"Nothing" is a song recorded by American singer-songwriter Janet Jackson. It was released on March 23, 2010 by A&M Records and So So Def Recordings as a soundtrack single from the film Why Did I Get Married Too?, which starred Jackson. The song was later included on Jackson's compilation album Icon: Number Ones. It was written by Jackson, Johntá Austin, Bryan-Michael Cox and Jermaine Dupri and produced by Jackson, Cox, and Dupri. Initially titled "Trust in Me", the song was written about the different character's personas and emotions in the film.

"Nothing" received mostly positive reviews from music critics, who praised it as "classic pop", and noted that it was possibly influenced by her brother Michael Jackson's recent death. Despite the fact that it was not officially released to radio formats for airplay, the song managed to achieve moderate rotation on adult contemporary and jazz formats. A music video for the song was directed by Tim Palen and premiered in April 2010. Jackson performed "Nothing" on the ninth season finale of American Idol and on the Essence Music Festival, which Jackson headlined.

== Background ==
"Nothing" is about the characters in the movie; I tried to write at least one verse for each couple. I think the fans can relate because, if you look at the characters, there is something in one - or, as in my case, many of them, that you can relate to...In that way, music and movies are very similar; you relate to the story when you experience them, and that is what makes it powerful."

— Janet Jackson on the concept of "Nothing"

"Nothing" was composed by Janet Jackson, Johntá Austin, Bryan-Michael Cox and Jermaine Dupri and produced by Jackson, Cox, and Dupri. It was released on March 30, 2010 as the theme for Why Did I Get Married Too?, which starred Jackson. It was released as a stand-alone single in addition to appearing on the Why Did I Get Married Too? soundtrack, and was later included on Jackson's Icon: Number Ones compilation. "Nothing" was strongly considered for a nomination for "Best Original Song" at the 83rd Academy Awards, but ultimately was not nominated.

On February 11, 2010 Jackson revealed the song's title on her official Twitter account. Janet's official site announced "Janet composed 'Nothing' as an emotional ballad that reflects and supports the powerful themes of the film..[&] evokes the emotional turmoil the Why Did I Get Married Too? characters experience throughout the film." Initially titled "Trust in Me", Jackson spoke to The LA Times about the song, stating "Even though it sounds like a sad song, it's hopeful. When you really listen to it, it's really hopeful." When asked why she felt the song resonated with so many fans, Janet replied that she felt the song helped people relate to the characters in the movie.

Music supervisor Joel C. High, who recruited artists to appear on the film's soundtrack, commented "we were lucky to have Janet involved, especially at a time where she was going through a lot. We were basically finished with the picture when she told Tyler she wanted to write something. It's a strong love song [...] and is our big end title finish." Co-producer Jermaine Dupri also spoke about the song, revealing "We had to do this record in like three days to get it into this movie – it was a last minute thing that her and Tyler [Perry] talked about." Dupri also added "You haven't heard Janet sound like this in a long time and I think the song is perfect for the movie. It's a really good record."

== Promotion ==
To promote the song and film, Janet held a contest on her official website titled "Janet's Everything for Nothing Experience", which allowed the winner to receive a personally autographed copy of her Number Ones compilation, with the grand-prize winner receiving an autographed Why Did I Get Married Too? poster. Expressing gratitude to her fans, Jackson tweeted "Thank u for all the love on 'Nothing.' I hope u will enjoy Why Did I Get Married Too this week!"

== Critical reception ==
"Janet Jackson, by virtue of coming from the same DNA pool as Michael, and by virtue of having grown up singing with him, likely finds it very natural to sing in a manner that sounds very similar to that of her late brother’s effeminate voice. And frankly, she’s one of the few people in the world who has a right to sound that much like Michael. She’s at this point the de facto representative of the Jackson clan, and the closest thing we have remaining in terms of his legacy."

— Beatweek Magazine on Janet's vocals sounding similar to Michael Jackson's in "Nothing"

MTV qualified "Nothing" as having "waves of heartfelt emotion" and "mournful beauty". Rolling Stone described the track as "classic pop," adding that the lyrics reflect the tensions and turmoil between the film characters. Cristen Maher from AOL Music's The Boombox called the song "an uplifting ballad...about the ups and downs that occur when two people are in love. The overall message is that when it comes to love, nothing can stand in the way of making things right." Maher adds "Jackson — who is still coping with the loss of her brother Michael — drew inspiration from her grief for her theatrical performance...transferring her sorrow beautifully into a moving and deeply heartfelt ballad."

Idolator stated that the song "reminds us that, despite all the overproduction and sexed-up whispering on her last few singles, Janet can actually still deliver solid vocals—something that was hardly apparent on “We Are The World 25". Entertainment Weekly described the song as an "airy ballad, on which she cries out for more communication in a troubled relationship." Deborah Vankin of The Los Angeles Times called it "a touching, melodic ballad about truth, trust and relationships", adding that the song is "generating almost as much Oscar buzz as it feels riddled with grief [...] Even though Jackson says "Nothing" is not about her brother, whom she won't talk about much these days, the song's melancholy and emotional grit leads one to wonder. It's no stretch to think that Jackson, who's known for having a particularly strong work ethic and occasionally losing herself in creative projects during turbulent times, was channeling the fallout of her personal tragedy into her music."

== Music video ==
Jackson shot the music video for "Nothing" on March 24, 2010, with it being premiered the following week on AOL Music. The video was directed by Tim Palen, photographer and co-President of Theatrical Marketing at Lions Gate Entertainment, the company that released Why Did I Get Married Too?. The video features several shots of Jackson in mirror-like projections accompanied by powerful and passionate clips from the film. Internationally, the video was released to music channels on July 19. A behind the scenes segment on the filming of the video was shown on TV Guide Network's Hollywood 411. The "Nothing" music video was included in the "Special Features" segment of the Why Did I Get Married Too? Blu-ray and DVD.

AOL Music's The Boombox commented "the superstar’s newest video for ‘Nothing’ encompasses the message of the song, with a stark blackness acting as a backdrop to Jackson's emotional release." Idolator called the video "heavy on the singing, light on the Nasty", noting the stripped down approach of the clip was "hardly a tour de force".

== Live performances ==
Jackson made a surprise appearance on the ninth season finale of American Idol to perform a medley of "Nothing" and "Nasty" after joining the contestants to perform a rendition of her hit ballad "Again". MTV expressed that Jackson provided the audience with waves of heartfelt emotion as she sang "Nothing". Zap2it stated that the performance of "Nothing" was moving. Neon Limelight stated that Jackson "brought the crowd to its feet.

The song was also performed at the Essence Music Festival, which Jackson headlined, with the performance from the event broadcast on TV One. "Nothing" was later included on the setlist of Jackson's Number Ones, Up Close and Personal tour in 2011. The song was performed after a video interlude displaying scenes from Jackson's various acting roles, including Poetic Justice, Why Did I Get Married Too?, and Good Times. MuuMuse commented on the tour's performance, saying "Perched on top of a stool, Jackson delivered a 1-2-3 punch of some of her biggest ballads–including 'Again,' 'Let's Wait Awhile,' and her latest offering, 'Nothing'–as the crowd lovingly swayed and sang along."

== Charts ==
Weekly Chart Performance for "Nothing"
Chart (2010)	Peak position
US Hot Adult R&B Airplay	15
US Hot R&B/Hip-Hop Songs	58
