= I Do... Until I Don't =

2017 American comedy film by Lake Bell

- Theatrical release poster
- Directed by: Lake Bell
- Written by: Lake Bell
- Produced by: Miranda Bailey; Lake Bell; Amanda Marshall; Jett Steiger
- Starring: Lake Bell; Ed Helms; Mary Steenburgen; Paul Reiser; Amber Heard; Wyatt Cenac; Dolly Wells
- Cinematography: Wyatt Garfield
- Edited by: Kayla Emter
- Production companies: Ways & Means; Cold Iron Pictures
- Distributed by: The Film Arcade
- Release date: September 1, 2017
- Running time: 106 minutes
- Country: United States
- Language: English
- Box office: $280,668

I Do... Until I Don't is a 2017 American comedy film written and directed by Lake Bell. The film stars Bell, Ed Helms, Mary Steenburgen, Paul Reiser, Amber Heard, Dolly Wells, and Wyatt Cenac. The film was released on September 1, 2017, by The Film Arcade.

== Plot ==
After a bad breakup, documentary filmmaker Vivian arrives in Florida in search of couples who are about to split, with a theory that marriage should last for only seven years, with an option to renew. The film shows three different marriages: Alice and Noah, who are struggling to get pregnant, Cybil and Harvey, an older couple who have been married for years, and polyamorous hippies Fanny and Zander.

== Cast ==
- Lake Bell as Alice Brewing
- Ed Helms as Noah Brewing
- Mary Steenburgen as Cybil Burger
- Paul Reiser as Harvey Burger
- Amber Heard as Fanny
- Wyatt Cenac as Zander
- Dolly Wells as Vivian Prudeck
- Chace Crawford as Egon
- Hannah Friedman as Millie
- Connie Shin as Mel
- Chauntae Pink as Bonnie
- Rae Gray as Lyn

== Production ==
The working title What's the Point? was used before the film's release. On March 23, 2016, it was announced Lake Bell and Ed Helms would star in the film. On April 7, 2016, it was announced Mary Steenburgen, Paul Reiser, Amber Heard, Dolly Wells and Chace Crawford had joined of the cast of the film. Principal photography began on April 3, 2016, and ended on April 29, 2016.

== Release ==
The film was released on September 1, 2017, by The Film Arcade.

== Critical response ==
On Rotten Tomatoes, the film has an approval rating of 28% based on 65 reviews, with an average rating of 4.2/10. The site's critical consensus reads, "I Do... Until I Don't misses opportunities for fresh observations, settling instead for a middle of the road romantic comedy lacking memorable characters or real emotional stakes." On Metacritic, the film has a weighted average score of 43 out of 100, based on 18 critics, indicating "mixed or average" reviews.
