= Don't Think Twice =

- Theatrical release poster
- Directed by: Mike Birbiglia
- Written by: Mike Birbiglia
- Produced by: Miranda Bailey; Amanda Marshall; Mike Birbiglia; Ira Glass
- Starring: Keegan-Michael Key; Gillian Jacobs; Mike Birbiglia; Kate Micucci; Chris Gethard; Tami Sagher
- Cinematography: Joe Anderson
- Edited by: Geoffrey Richman
- Music by: Roger Neill
- Production companies: The Film Arcade; Cold Iron Pictures; Secret Public Productions
- Distributed by: The Film Arcade
- Release dates: March 13, 2016 (SXSW); July 22, 2016 (United States)
- Running time: 92 minutes
- Country: United States
- Language: English
- Budget: $2.4 million
- Box office: $4.4 million

Don't Think Twice is a 2016 American comedy-drama film written and directed by Mike Birbiglia and starring Birbiglia, Keegan-Michael Key, Gillian Jacobs, Kate Micucci, Tami Sagher and Chris Gethard. The film had its world premiere at South by Southwest on March 13, 2016, and was released on July 22, 2016, by The Film Arcade.

== Plot ==
The Commune is an improv troupe in New York headed by a man named Miles. Other members include Jack, a talented improviser with a tendency to grandstand; Sam, his insecure girlfriend who acts as the group's emcee; Allison, who has been working on a graphic novel for years; Lindsay, who lives off her wealthy parents; and Bill, who loves improv but feels increasingly unsuccessful.

One night, the group learns that staff from Weekend Live, a Saturday Night Live-style sketch comedy show, are attending a performance. Miles is excited for another chance to audition for the show, having auditioned and not been selected years ago. However, Jack ends up grandstanding during the performance, much to the anger of the rest of the group.

Following the performance, Jack receives a phone call informing him that he and Sam are being invited to audition. Jack attends the audition, but Sam loses her nerve at the last minute and does not.

Jack is selected as a new cast member, and his friends begin asking about the possibility of joining the writing staff, or having Jack arrange auditions for them. Meanwhile, Bill's father is in a serious motorcycle accident and the group travels to Philadelphia to visit him in the hospital.

Jack finds success at Weekend Live playing an old-timey ticket taker in a sketch, but finds the pressure of the show difficult to manage. The Commune sees an uptick in its audience, but they are mostly there to see Jack and his ticket taker character rather than the rest of the performers.

With their theater space closing, the group decides to hold a show at a new space, but the ticket price discourages audiences from attending and they fail to recoup their investment. The group gathers to watch Weekend Live and discovers Jack performing a sketch they had improvised at a prior Commune show. Infuriated, they crash the after party. Miles confronts Jack and punches him before being thrown out.

When Miles then confronts Lindsay for failing to support him, she reveals that she has been hired by the show and did not want to embarrass herself in front of her new co workers. Embittered by this revelation, Miles, Allison, and Bill storm off.

At the final Commune show, Sam stands on stage alone and asks her usual opening question "Has anyone had a particularly bad day?" When an audience member suggests that Sam herself looks like she's had a bad day, she agrees and launches into a solo improv where she is trapped at the bottom of a well while her other castmates cannot decide how to help her. Jack arrives and joins the scene, promising that he will not abandon her. But Sam tells him that she is happy in the well and she knows and accepts that their relationship is over.

Eight months later, Jack and Lindsay continue to enjoy success performing and writing for Weekend Live. Miles is in a long-term relationship with an old flame from high school, and Sam, Bill, and Allison are starting a new improv group and looking for local talent. The old group reunites for Bill's father's funeral. Despite their conflict, the group has remained friends.

== Cast ==
- Keegan-Michael Key as Jack
- Mike Birbiglia as Miles
- Gillian Jacobs as Samantha
- Kate Micucci as Allison
- Tami Sagher as Lindsay
- Chris Gethard as Bill
- Seth Barrish as Timothy
- Erin Darke as Natasha
- Lena Dunham as herself
- Ben Stiller as himself
- Pete Holmes as himself
- Maggie Kemper as Liz
- Adam Pally as Robbie
- Jo Firestone as Jo
- Connor Ratliff as Connor
- Sunita Mani as Amy
- Sondra James as Bonnie
- Gary Richardson as Gary

== Production ==
Principal photography on the film began in late August 2015 in New York City, with Mike Birbiglia writing and directing. Birbiglia would also produce the film along with Cold Iron Pictures' Miranda Bailey and Amanda Marshall, and This American Life's Ira Glass, while Cold Iron and The Film Arcade would finance the film. It was also announced Keegan-Michael Key, Gillian Jacobs, Kate Micucci, Tami Sagher, Chris Gethard, and Birbiglia would star in the film. It was later revealed Lena Dunham and Ben Stiller would make appearances as themselves.

== Release ==
The film had its world premiere at South by Southwest on March 13, 2016. It went on to screen at the Tribeca Film Festival on April 16, 2016. In April 2016, it was revealed that The Film Arcade, who financed the film, would distribute the film in a platform release in Summer 2016. The film was released on July 22, 2016.

== Reception ==
=== Box office ===
The film had a one-theater opening in New York City on July 22, 2016, and grossed $92,835 in its opening weekend, the highest per-screen gross of 2016 beating the record set the previous week by Café Society ($71,858). Its record was then surpassed in October by Moonlight ($100,519).

=== Critical response ===
Review aggregator Rotten Tomatoes gives the film an approval rating of 98% based on 126 reviews, with an average rating of 7.8/10. The site's critical consensus reads, "Don't Think Twice offers a bittersweet look at the comedian's life that's as genuinely moving as it is laugh-out-loud funny -- and a brilliant calling card for writer-director Mike Birbiglia." On Metacritic, the film has a score of 83 out of 100, based on 30 critics, indicating "universal acclaim".
