= Family (2018 film) =

- Theatrical release poster
- Directed by: Laura Steinel
- Written by: Laura Steinel
- Produced by: Jeremy Garelick; Kit Giordano; Sue Naegle
- Starring: Taylor Schilling; Brian Tyree Henry; Bryn Vale; Allison Tolman; Fabrizio Guido; Kate McKinnon; Peter Horton
- Cinematography: Michael Simmonds
- Edited by: Glenn Garland
- Music by: Jeremy Turner
- Production companies: Naegle Ink; Stage 6 Films
- Distributed by: The Film Arcade
- Release dates: March 11, 2018 (SXSW); April 19, 2019 (United States)
- Running time: 88 minutes
- Country: United States
- Language: English
- Box office: $194,601

Family is a 2018 American comedy film written and directed by Laura Steinel in her feature directorial debut. Starring Taylor Schilling, Brian Tyree Henry, Bryn Vale, Allison Tolman, Fabrizio Guido, Kate McKinnon, and Peter Horton, the film follows an emotionally stunted aunt attempting to form a relationship with her teenage niece who wants to run away from home and become a Juggalo.

Family premiered at South by Southwest on March 11, 2018, and was theatrically released in the United States on April 19, 2019. The film received positive reviews from critics, with Schilling's performance singled out for praise.

== Plot ==
Kate Stone is a career-focused, abrasive Senior Vice President at a New Jersey hedge fund. Her egotistical attitude isolates her from her colleagues; she mocks a pregnant co-worker and is generally disliked by her staff. Kate lives a solitary life, often drinking alone.

Kate's estranged brother, Joe, calls asking her to babysit his tween daughter, Maddie, for one night so he and his wife, Cheryl, can move Cheryl's mother into hospice. Kate initially refuses but reluctantly agrees when she realizes she is their last option. The overnight stay extends into a week as the hospice situation becomes complicated, throwing Kate’s regimented life into chaos.

Kate discovers that Maddie is bullied, socially isolated, and angry. Although her parents try to force her into traditional feminine activities like ballet to help her make friends, Maddie secretly sneaks into the karate dojo next door. Kate begins to bond with Maddie, allowing her to buy a pantsuit for the school dance instead of the dress her parents want, and permitting her to eat chicken parmesan every night. At a convenience store, Maddie befriends a "Juggalo" named Dennis (who calls himself "Baby Joker").

Later, Kate finds Dennis in her home. Though initially put off by his face paint, she allows him to stay when he explains that Juggalos are a supportive community of misfits who treat each other like family. Kate attempts to give Maddie beauty tips, but Maddie prefers showing off her karate gear. When Maddie fights back against her bullies at school, Kate and Sensei Pete are called in. Pete is impressed by Maddie’s skill, Erin, a younger analyst Kate is training, begins to threaten Kate's position by ingratiating herself with potential clients. Erin organizes a critical client meeting for Friday night, forcing Kate to break her promise to chaperone Maddie at the school dance. Maddie is denied entry to the dance because she is not wearing a dress. When Kate finally arrives, she finds Maddie ill from a severe reaction to tomatoes, a dietary restriction Kate had ignored. Joe and Cheryl arrive at the hospital, furious with Kate's negligence.

Kate returns to work but finds herself miserable. She visits the dojo to find Maddie, but Pete has not seen her. Joe and Cheryl arrive at the ballet studio to pick Maddie up, only to discover she has been skipping ballet for karate. Realizing where Maddie has gone, Kate tracks her to the Gathering of the Juggalos.

Kate applies face paint to blend in and navigates the crowd to find Maddie. They reconcile, and Maddie is accepted by the group. In the aftermath, Kate loosens up at work, finally making friends with her colleagues and repairing her relationship with her family.

== Cast ==
- Taylor Schilling as Kate, Joe’s sister, and Maddie’s aunt
- Brian Tyree Henry as Pete
- Bryn Vale as Maddie, Kate’s niece, and Cheryl and Joe’s daughter
- Allison Tolman as Cheryl, Joe’s wife, and Maddie’s mother
- Jessie Ennis as Erin
- Matt Walsh as Dan
- Eric Edelstein as Joe, Kate’s brother, Cheryl’s husband, and Maddie’s father
- Fabrizio Guido as Dennis
- Peter Horton as Charlie
- Blair Beeken as Barb
- Karan Kendrick as Sarah
- Kate McKinnon as Jill
- Christopher Bianculli as Sparring Boy
- FlipFlop The Clown as himself

The hip hop duo Insane Clown Posse, Violent J and Shaggy 2 Dope—credited under their real names, Joseph Bruce and Joseph Utsler—also appear as MCs for the Miss Juggalette Pageant, where Natasha Lyonne appears as a Juggalette.

== Release ==
Family premiered at South by Southwest on March 11, 2018. The Film Arcade acquired its distribution rights in September 2018 and released it April 19, 2019.

=== Critical response ===
On review aggregator Rotten Tomatoes, Family holds an approval rating of 77% based on 60 reviews, with an average rating of 6.4/10. The website's critics consensus reads, "The definitive juggalo-infused self-discovery comedy, Family transcends its overly familiar elements with fresh twists and Taylor Schilling's appealing performance." Metacritic, which uses a weighted average, assigned the film a score of 60 out of 100, based on 8 critics, indicating "mixed or average" reviews.
