= Sleepwalk with Me =

- Theatrical release poster
- Directed by: Mike Birbiglia; Seth Barrish (co-director)
- Written by: Mike Birbiglia; Ira Glass; Joe Birbiglia; Seth Barrish
- Produced by: Ira Glass; Jacob Jaffke
- Starring: Mike Birbiglia; Lauren Ambrose; James Rebhorn; Carol Kane; Cristin Milioti
- Cinematography: Adam Beckman
- Edited by: Geoffrey Richman
- Music by: Andrew Hollander
- Production companies: Bedrock Media; WBEZ Chicago
- Distributed by: IFC Films
- Release dates: January 23, 2012 (Sundance Film Festival); August 24, 2012 (United States)
- Running time: 80 minutes
- Country: United States
- Language: English
- Box office: $2.2 million

Sleepwalk with Me is a 2012 American independent comedy film co-written by, directed by, and starring Mike Birbiglia. It also stars Lauren Ambrose, James Rebhorn, Carol Kane, and Cristin Milioti. Before making the film, Birbiglia had already told the autobiographical story of his struggles to become a stand-up comedian while dealing with REM behavior disorder and a failing relationship in a one-man show and a book.

The film had its world premiere at the Sundance Film Festival on January 23, 2012, where it won the Best of NEXT Audience Award, and was released theatrically in the United States by IFC Films on August 24, 2012.

== Plot ==
While driving, Matt Pandamiglio tells a story that begins with him, although he still has reservations, moving in with his girlfriend of eight years, Abby.

At his sister Janet's engagement party, several of Matt's relatives ask when he is getting married, and that night he sleepwalks for the first time. Abby tells Matt she finds his complete lack of interest in marriage to be weird, and Matt relates how he is the one who initially pursued her, but it is she who was responsible for most of the subsequent progression in their relationship. Matt is surprised to find the TiVo full of wedding-themed shows, so he talks with Janet, and she tells him that maybe he and Abby should take a "breather".

At the comedy club where Matt tends bar, he is about to talk to Abby about taking a breather when some friends show up with their baby and his boss, Ron, offers him some time on the stage. After his set, much of which consists of material he has been doing since college, Matt talks to a comedian who complains about the entertainment industry and his agent, Colleen. Ignoring the complaints, Matt goes over to Colleen and, with help from Abby, gets her card.

That night, Matt does not want to have sex with Abby after she has been talking about babies, and he sleepwalks again, falling off of a dresser. His father is worried about him and tells Matt to see a sleep specialist, but Matt minimizes the problem.

Colleen meets with Matt and, after initially trying to brush him off, books him for a low-paying gig that night at a college upstate after he says he has a car. Skipping work, Matt is told at the college that they forgot they booked a comedian and offer to let him emcee a lip sync contest. It is poorly-attended, but Matt enjoys getting paid to perform and staying in a motel.

The next day, Matt opens for Marc Mulheren. He struggles, but, afterward, Marc talks to Matt and laughs at something he says about his relationship, saying he should repeat it on stage. When Matt takes this advice, he finally gets some laughs. Excited, he calls Abby, but she is out with friends and they have trouble understanding each other. He hangs out with three other comedians and sleeps on their couch, though he wakes up in the shower.

Over time, Matt refines his act all over the northeastern U.S. One night, a waitress comes on to him, and they end up having sex in his car. He feels guilty at Janet's wedding the next day, and he does not know what to say when his mother asks if he wants Abby to be in the pictures of the bride's family. After riding home in silence, Abby goes out and returns drunk. She says they should break up if Matt never wants to get married and starts to pack her things. Matt finds himself proposing to her, and she eventually accepts.

Matt's sleepwalking intensifies, and Abby begins to push him to see a doctor, but he is scared, and instead incorporates jokes about his condition into his act. Abby begins to plan the wedding, and one night, after his mother sends him a picture of Abby's wedding dress, Matt jumps out a hotel window while asleep and has to have shards of glass removed from his legs. When he gets home, he tells Abby that he does not want to get married, and they break up.

Back in his car, Matt says that, when he was preparing to make this film, he went to visit Abby, who is now married with two children, to ask why she stayed with him so long, and she said she did not want to hurt him. He arrives at a comedy club and performs the story he has just narrated, telling the audience that he finally saw a sleep specialist and was diagnosed with REM behavior disorder. Now, he follows a sleep routine, takes medication, and sleeps in a sleeping bag to restrict his movement. Although he is not "cured", he says that is okay.

== Cast ==
- Mike Birbiglia as Matt Pandamiglio, a struggling stand-up comedian
- Lauren Ambrose as Abby, Matt's long-term girlfriend, who is a voice coach
- James Rebhorn as Frank Pandamiglio, Matt's father
- Carol Kane as Linda Pandamiglio, Matt's mother
- Cristin Milioti as Janet Pandamiglio, Matt's sister
- Aya Cash as Hannah, Matt and Abby's friend, Pete's wife, and a new mother
- Marylouise Burke as Aunt Lucille, Matt's aunt
- Loudon Wainwright III as Uncle Max, Matt's uncle
- Ben Levin as Philip, Janet's fiancé
- Henry Phillips as Henry, a comedian Matt befriends
- Jessi Klein as Lynn, a comedian Matt befriends
- Emily Meade as Samantha, a waitress
- Danny Borbon as Tommy, who appears on Wedding Tales and in Matt's dreams
- Amanda Perez as Tammy, who appears on Wedding Tales and in Matt's dreams
- Kristen Schaal as Cynthia, the organizer of a lip sync contest Matt emcees
- Alex Karpovsky as Ian, a comedian who performs at Ron's club
- Ron Nakahara as Ron, the owner of the comedy club where Matt tends bar
- Wyatt Cenac as Chris, a comedian Matt befriends
- Marc Maron as Marc Mulheren, a comedian for whom Matt is an opening act
- David Wain as Pete, Matt and Abby's friend, Hannah's husband, and a new father
- Dr. William C. Dement as himself, a sleep researcher
- Sondra James as Colleen, Ian and Matt's agent
- John Lutz as Chip, an employee at La Quinta Inns & Suites

Ira Glass, who co-wrote and produced the film, has a cameo appearance as the photographer at Janet and Philip's wedding.

== Background ==
In 2008, Mike Birbiglia's one-man show Sleepwalk with Me opened off-Broadway at the Bleecker Street Theater. The show, which was presented by Nathan Lane, blended stand-up comedy with theater and was a critical success. The New York Times called it "simply perfect", and Time Out New York named it their "Show of the Year" for 2009. Birbiglia's performance of an excerpt from the one-man show at The Moth was used as the first act of "Fear of Sleep", the August 8, 2008, episode of This American Life, and the host of This American Life, Ira Glass, ended up working with Birbiglia to write and produce the film.

After writing the one-man show, Birbiglia wrote the book Sleepwalk With Me & Other Painfully True Stories, which debuted at number 29 on The New York Times' hardcover nonfiction bestseller list in October 2010 and was a finalist for the 2011 Thurber Prize for American Humor.

== Release ==
The film premiered at the 2012 Sundance Film Festival in the NEXT category, and IFC Films acquired its distribution rights soon after. It screened at the South By Southwest Film Festival, was the opening night film at the Independent Film Festival of Boston, and was the centerpiece film at the Nantucket Film Festival, where it won the award for Best Writer/Director. Also appearing at the Seattle International Film Festival, the Lighthouse International Film Festival, and the Provincetown International Film Festival, it was the opening night film at BAMcinemaFest in Brooklyn, NY, where it sold out BAM's Opera House.

The first weekend of its limited theatrical release in the United States, Sleepwalk with Me set records for the IFC Center's biggest opening weekend, as well as the highest per-screen average for a first-time American filmmaker.

== Reception ==
On review aggregator website Rotten Tomatoes, the film holds an 84% approval rating based on 117 reviews, with an average rating of 7.1/10; the site's "critics consensus" reads: "Laugh-out-loud funny and endearingly messy, Sleepwalk with Me overcomes its tonal inconsistencies to deliver a sweetly melancholic, amiably reassuring indie crowd-pleaser." On Metacritic, the film has a weighted average score of 71 out of 100 based on reviews from 28 critics, indicating "generally favorable reviews".

Sleepwalk With Me has been nominated for awards and named to many year-end lists. Birbiglia was nominated for Breakthrough Actor at the Gotham Independent Film Awards, and the film was nominated for Best Art House Film by the St. Louis Film Critics Association. It was also named one of the Top Ten Independent Films of 2012 by the National Board of Review, was voted Laughspin readers' favorite comedy film of the year, and was #27 on Huffington Post's Best Films of 2012 list, with Mike Ryan calling it "the funniest movie of the year." Film.com named the film #11 on their 100 Best Films of 2012 list, writing: "Veteran comedian/first-time director Mike Birbiglia does something that Billy Crystal, Woody Allen, and Judd Apatow were never able to quite pull off: Making a film that honestly portrays the life of a stand-up."
