= A.C.O.D. =

2013 film by Stu Zicherman

- Theatrical release poster
- Directed by: Stu Zicherman
- Written by: Ben Karlin; Stu Zicherman
- Produced by: Teddy Schwarzman; Ben Karlin; Tim Perell
- Starring: Adam Scott; Richard Jenkins; Catherine O'Hara; Amy Poehler; Clark Duke; Jessica Alba; Jane Lynch
- Cinematography: John Bailey
- Edited by: Jeffrey Wolf
- Music by: Nick Urata
- Production company: Black Bear Pictures
- Distributed by: The Film Arcade; Paramount Home Media Distribution
- Release dates: January 23, 2013 (Sundance); October 4, 2013 (United States, limited)
- Running time: 90 minutes
- Country: United States
- Language: English
- Box office: $175,705

A.C.O.D. is a 2013 American dark comedy film directed by Stu Zicherman, based on a script by Zicherman and Ben Karlin, and starring Adam Scott, Amy Poehler, Jessica Alba, and Jane Lynch. The title of the film is an abbreviation for Adult Children of Divorce.

Teddy Schwarzman produced the film through his Black Bear Pictures production company. Other stars include Richard Jenkins, Mary Elizabeth Winstead and Catherine O'Hara, with Ken Howard and Clark Duke in supporting roles.

The mostly content and successful Carter decides to revisit a former counselor to make sense of his brother Trey's sudden wedding and his parents' extremely messy divorce. When he realizes his life has been personified in a book about children of divorce written by his mediocre 'counselor', he decides to confront his family about their dysfunctional nature.

The film was released in the U.S. on October 4, 2013.

== Plot ==
Since Carter's ninth birthday party at the Spencer family's lake house, his (and his brother Trey's) parents have subjected Carter to emotional manipulation, character assassination, uncomfortable new relationships and witness failed relationships repeatedly via their father Hugh. Not only is he a philanderer, but also a cold, distant father. Their mother Melissa cuts Hugh down relentlessly.

Trey spontaneously proposes to Keiko, his girlfriend of four months, then requests Carter get their feuding parents, who have not spoken for 20 years, to cooperate. Seeking advice from Dr. Lorraine Smith, who he had seen as a teen believing she was his therapist, Carter discovers he had been one of her subjects for a best-selling book on children of divorce. Shocked, he tracks it down, reading it from cover to cover, then formulates an attack plan.

As Carter is initially unsuccessful at convincing either Hugh or Melissa separately, he tricks them both into meeting for lunch at the same restaurant. With them cornered, Carter coerces them, explaining the meal is ordered and paid for, so they must stay until they agree how to be civil at the wedding.

Meeting up later, the Spencer boys feel content that Carter convinced their parents to call a truce. He tells Trey to not count on money from them, but to continue the planning.

Right after Hugh's domineering third wife Sondra presents the restaurant with an obligatory painting, as she sublets them the space, Dr. Smith appears. Carter has inadvertently inspired her to write a follow up book for C.O.D., the adult, 20 years later one. Initially, Carter refuses but is finally persuaded.

Sondra calls Carter, asking for details about his alleged golf outing with his father, as she is at her Cornell sorority reunion. Suspicious, he checks with Trey, who believes he is home with a bad stomach. Carter lets himself in, only to find his parents boning in the kitchen.

Carter rushes to tell his long-term girlfriend Lauren, but tells no-one else. Unbeknownst to Melissa, her husband Gary presents his stepsons with a large check for the wedding.

Hugh tries to convince Carter it was a one time encounter. Later, speaking with Dr. Smith, she believes Carter now still lives in reaction to the childhood trauma, by making sure he is always in control. Outside, he inadvertently meets Michelle, another of the subjects.

At the tux fitting, as Hugh gives is again a no show, Carter hunts down their mom, who again has used pilates as an excuse. Later on, as Keiko's parents have not met the Spencers, they meet up at a tea house. Both Hugh and Melissa show up, supposedly separately, but they soon annoy Carter so he storms outside. Now, they admit it is an actual affair.

Carter brings two file boxes from Melissa's with evidence of Hugh's cheating, first obsessively pawing through them, then dropping them at Dr. Smith's, insisting she confront his parents. That evening, Michelle shows up at Carter's restaurant, stays late talking, then they have a make out session.

At the cake tasting, Carter finally reveals to Trey their parents' secret affair, then suggests he try to handle it. Botching it, not only does Sondra file to divorce Hugh, but she evicts the restaurant. Confronted in his garage by his parents and Trey who blame him, as Keiko has paused the wedding, Carter quits the family, kicking them all out.

At Lauren's parents' annual anniversary party, Carter proposes. Mortified, Lauren breaks up with him. Carter takes the box of divorce evidence Dr. Smith returns to him to the lake house, which he has not visited in 20 years, and douses it in gasoline. Before he can light it, Gary appears. Soon, everyone else does too. Soon after Carter discovers that absolutely everyone else has frequented the house, the careless Sondra inadvertently burns it down with an unextinguished cigarette.

Carter volunteers to buy what once was the lake house. Time passes, and A.C.O.D. has its first reading, which includes the subjects. Lauren appears, and she goes off with Carter to talk. One year passes, and the three Spencer men are talking outside of a church, dressed in identical suits. They are all summoned into the church for a wedding.

== Cast ==
- Adam Scott as Carter Spencer
- Richard Jenkins as Hugh Spencer, Carter's father
- Catherine O'Hara as Melissa, Carter's mother
- Mary Elizabeth Winstead as Lauren Stinger, Carter's girlfriend
- Clark Duke as Trey Spencer, Carter's brother
- Jane Lynch as Dr. Lorraine Judith
- Amy Poehler as Sondra Spencer, Carter's stepmother and landlord
- Ken Howard as Gary, Carter's stepfather
- Valerie Tian as Keiko Kobayashi
- Jessica Alba as Michelle
- Adam Pally as Mark

Several cast additions were reported in Deadline Hollywood: Jenkins (December 7, 2011), Lynch (February 10), Winstead (March 1), Poehler (March 8). On March 20, Variety reported the Howard and Duke joined the cast. Pally's addition was reported in Entertainment Weekly on March 21.

== Production ==
Filming began on March 12, 2012 in Atlanta's Castleberry Hill area. It has done some filming at the Atlanta Botanical Garden. Scenes were also shot in Decatur at the end of the month. By early April, filming had taken place in Buckhead and near Lake Lanier.

Alba got temporary tattoos of a trio of roses on her left biceps and a bow on her tailbone for her role in the film from an Atlanta-based artist.

== Reception ==
A.C.O.D. received mixed reviews from critics. Film review aggregator Rotten Tomatoes reports that 52% of critics gave the film a positive review based on 58 reviews, with an average score of 5.49/10. The site's consensus states: "Despite its impressive cast and some sharp observations, A.C.O.D. is neither funny enough nor poignant enough to work as a potent comedy or incisive satire." While RogerEbert.com had the same type of mixed criticism for the film, the site also roundly praised the performances of Poehler, Lynch, and O'Hara, stating that the film featured "three major comic actresses working at their best level here." Furthermore, the site commended Zicherman's writing and directing, stating that "[h]is first film is a model of what a modern film comedy might be." Manohla Dargis of the New York Times Movie Review, however, criticized the film as "clichéd" and "sluggish even at 87 minutes."

On Metacritic, which assigns a rating out of 100 based on reviews from critics, the film has a score of 50 based on 23 reviews, considered to be "mixed or average" reviews.
