= June Zero =

- Film poster
- Directed by: Jake Paltrow
- Written by: Jake Paltrow; Tom Shoval
- Produced by: Miranda Bailey; Oren Moverman; David Silber
- Cinematography: Yaron Scharf
- Edited by: Ayelet Gil Efrat
- Music by: Ariel Marx
- Production companies: Cold Iron Pictures; Metro Communications
- Distributed by: Cohen Media Group
- Release dates: 1 July 2022 (KVIFF); 28 June 2024 (United States)
- Running time: 105 minutes
- Countries: Israel; United States
- Languages: Hebrew; Spanish
- Box office: $29,856

June Zero is a 2022 American-Israeli drama film co-written and directed by Jake Paltrow. It premiered at the 56th Karlovy Vary International Film Festival. It was released by Cohen Media with a limited release in the United States on 28 June 2024.

== Plot ==
The film is about the trial of Adolf Eichmann.

== Reception ==
On the review aggregator website Rotten Tomatoes, 86% of 35 critics' reviews are positive. The website's consensus reads: "At the crux of history and memory, June Zero takes an original and bold approach in examining the aftermath of the Holocaust." Metacritic, which uses a weighted average, assigned the film a score of 65 out of 100, based on 10 critics, indicating "generally favorable" reviews.

Matt Zoller Seitz of RogerEbert.com gave the film three out of four stars and wrote, "There's no shortage of films that consider the Holocaust or Israel's founding. But it's rare to see the two subjects intertwined so purposely as in June Zero. The idea to fold it all into an anthology of interconnected short films might be unique."

Greg Nussen of Slant Magazine also gave the film three out of four stars and wrote, "June Zero is a tender, if sometimes cynical, portrait of a new country on old land struggling through the growing pains of establishing its presence both to the international community and its own people."
