= Hellbenders (film) =

- Theatrical release poster
- Directed by: J. T. Petty
- Screenplay by: J. T. Petty
- Produced by: Jon S. Denny; Lawrence Mattis; David Moscow; Mark L. Pederson; Aldey Sanchez
- Starring: Clifton Collins Jr. Clancy Brown; Andre Royo; Robyn Rikoon; Macon Blair; Stephen Gevedon; Dan Fogler
- Cinematography: Ryan Samul
- Edited by: Jacob Craycroft; Joel Plotch
- Music by: Jeff Grace
- Production companies: Circle of Confusion; Off Hollywood Pictures; Ambush Entertainment; UnLTD Productions
- Distributed by: Lionsgate; The Film Arcade
- Release dates: September 9, 2012 (TIFF); October 18, 2013 (United States)
- Running time: 85 minutes
- Country: United States
- Language: English

Hellbenders is a 2012 American comedy horror film written and directed by J. T. Petty. The film stars Clifton Collins Jr., Clancy Brown, Andre Royo, Robyn Rikoon, Macon Blair and Stephen Gevedon. The film was released on October 18, 2013, by The Film Arcade.

== Cast ==
- Clifton Collins Jr. as Lawrence
- Clancy Brown as Angus
- Andre Royo as Stephen
- Robyn Rikoon as Elizabeth
- Macon Blair as Macon
- Stephen Gevedon as Clint
- Larry Fessenden as Detective Elrod
- Dan Fogler as Eric

== Release ==
The film premiered at the 2012 Toronto International Film Festival on September 9, 2012. In November 2012, Lionsgate acquired distribution rights to the film for the United States, Canada and India, with The Film Arcade distributing theatrically in the United States. The film was released on October 18, 2013, by The Film Arcade.
