= Mike Birbiglia =

American comedian and actor (born 1978)

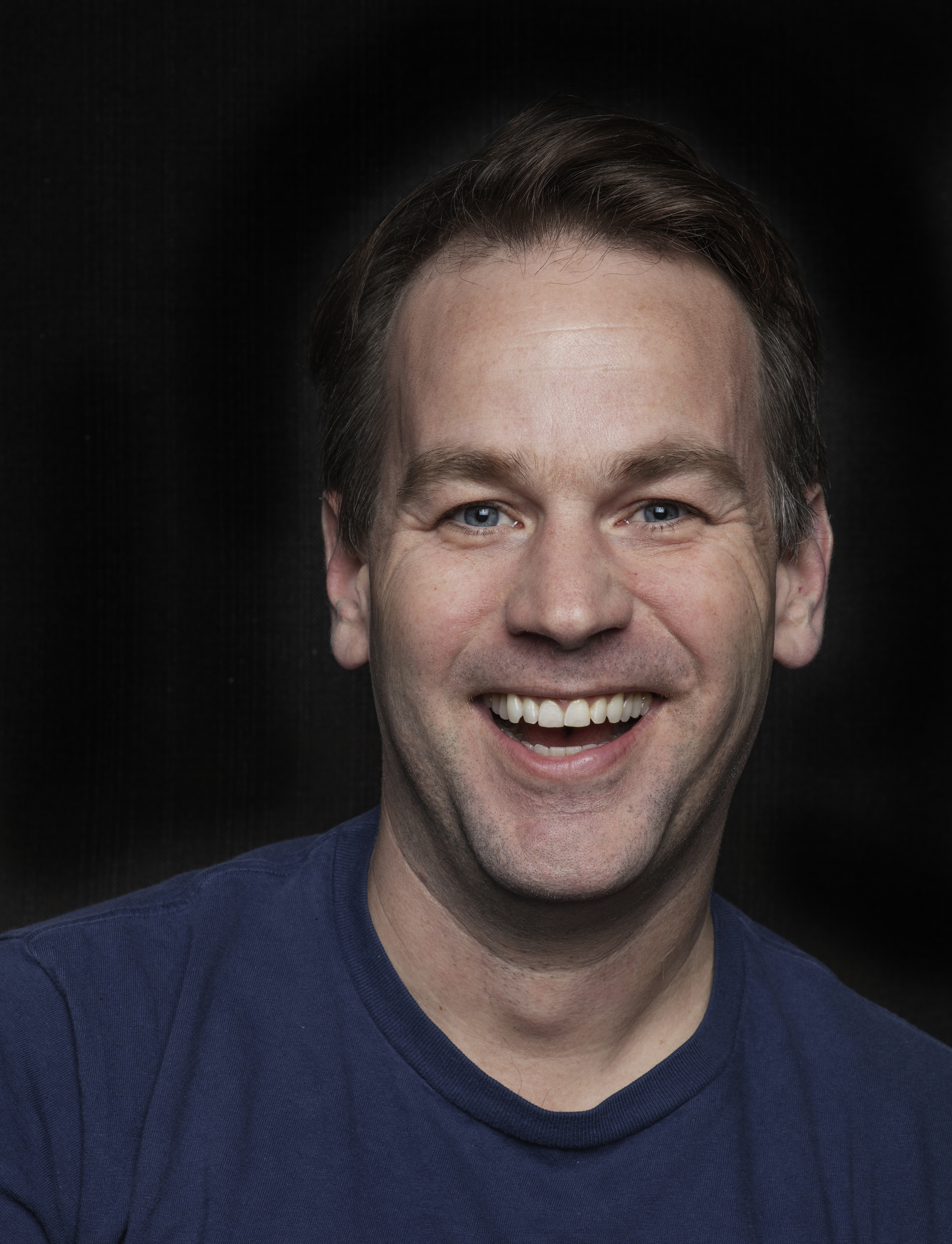
- Birbiglia in 2020
- Born: June 20, 1978 (age 48); Shrewsbury, Massachusetts, U.S.
- Education: Georgetown University (BA)
- Spouse: Jen Stein (m. 2008)
- Children: 1

Comedy career
- Years active: 1997–present
- Medium: Stand-up; television; film
- Website: birbigs.com

Mike Birbiglia (/bɜːrˈbɪɡliə/; born June 20, 1978) is an American comedian, actor, director, producer and Emmy-nominated writer. He has written and performed a series of award-winning solo shows worldwide. His six solo shows, Sleepwalk With Me, My Girlfriend’s Boyfriend, Thank God For Jokes, The New One, The Old Man and the Pool, and The Good Life, enjoyed successful runs on and off Broadway and became hit Netflix comedy specials. Birbiglia also wrote, directed, and starred in the films Sleepwalk with Me (2012) and Don't Think Twice (2016). As an actor, Birbiglia has appeared in the films Trainwreck (2015), The Fault in Our Stars (2014), Popstar, A Man Called Otto as well as TV roles in Orange Is the New Black and Billions. He hosts the podcast Mike Birbiglia's Working it Out.

== Early life and education ==
Birbiglia was born in Shrewsbury, Massachusetts, the son of Mary Jean (née McKenzie), a nurse, and Vincent Paul Birbiglia, a neurologist. He is the youngest of four children. He is partially of Italian descent and was raised Roman Catholic. Birbiglia attended the all-boys Catholic school St. John's High School for one year, and graduated from St. Mark's School in 1996. He says seeing comedian Steven Wright perform inspired him to begin writing jokes at age 16. He attended Georgetown University, graduating in 2000 with a degree in English. During college he performed as a member of the Georgetown Players Improv Troupe with John Mulaney and Nick Kroll, worked as a server in a comedy club, and began performing at DC Improv (The Improv) in Washington, D.C.

== Career ==
=== Early career ===
Birbiglia began doing improv in 1997. He moved to New York in 2000, and appeared on the Late Show with David Letterman in 2002. He told his first story on stage at the U.S. Comedy Arts Festival in Aspen, in 2003, and eventually became a semi-regular contributor to The Moth storytelling series. He released his first album, Dog Years, in 2004, followed by My Secret Public Album, Volume 1a (2005) a compilation of his appearances on The Bob and Tom Show. His next two albums, Two Drink Mike (2006), and My Secret Public Journal Live (2007) were released on Comedy Central Records. My Secret Public Journal Live was named one of the best comedy albums of the decade by The A.V. Club.

In 2008 CBS picked up a sitcom pilot loosely based on Birbiglia's life and featuring him, Bob Odenkirk and Frances Conroy that ultimately never aired. He later called the failure of his pilot "the luckiest thing that ever happened to me."

=== Sleepwalk and beyond ===
In 2008, Birbiglia opened Sleepwalk with Me, a one-man show that straddled standup comedy and theater, off-Broadway at the Bleecker Street Theater. The show was presented by Nathan Lane, and The New York Times called it "simply perfect". Time Out New York named it their "Show of the Year" in 2009.

Birbiglia adapted his material into the 2010 book Sleepwalk with Me, and Other Painfully True Stories and the 2011 album Sleepwalk With Me Live. The book debuted at #29 on the hardcover nonfiction New York Times Bestseller List and number four on the hardcover nonfiction section of the Washington Post Political Bookworm Best Sellers. The book was also a finalist for the 2011 Thurber Prize for American Humor. Sleepwalk With Me Live debuted at #1 on the Billboard Comedy Charts.

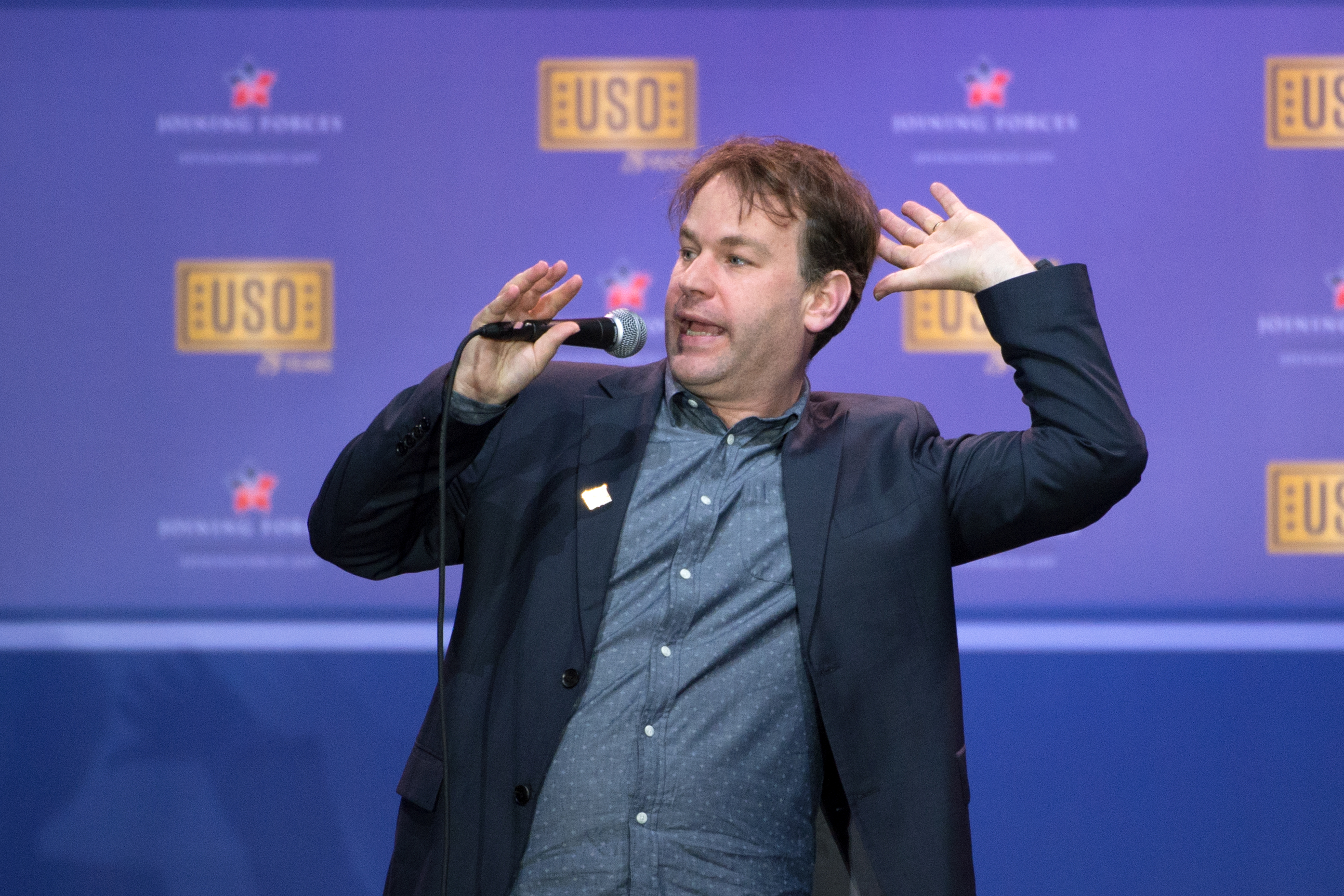
Birbiglia performing in 2016

Birbiglia made his directorial debut with Sleepwalk with Me, based on his one-man show and which he wrote, directed, and starred in. The film premiered at the 2012 Sundance Film Festival and won the NEXT Audience Award. It was selected in the "Festival Favorites" category at the South by Southwest film festival in Austin, Texas and also appeared in the Nantucket Film Festival where it won the award for best writer/director. The film was produced by Jacob Jaffke and This American Life's Ira Glass and stars Birbiglia, Lauren Ambrose, Carol Kane, James Rebhorn, and Cristin Milioti and has cameos by Glass, Kristen Schaal, Wyatt Cenac, David Wain, Jessi Klein, John Lutz and Marc Maron. While hosting the 2012 Gotham Awards, Birbiglia roasted I Heart Huckabees director David O. Russell by reading a transcript of Russell's on-set argument with actress Lily Tomlin. The event, specifically the joke and what transpired after it, later formed a large part of Birbiglia's show, Thank God for Jokes.

In addition to starring in Sleepwalk with Me, Birbiglia has appeared in films such as Trainwreck, Going the Distance, Cedar Rapids, Your Sister's Sister and The Fault in Our Stars. He has also guest-starred in episodes of Girls, Inside Amy Schumer, and Broad City. He played the role of Oscar Langstraat in the third and fifth seasons of Showtime's hit show Billions and Danny Pearson on the Netflix series Orange Is the New Black in its third and fourth seasons, with which he shared the 2016 Screen Actors Guild Award for Outstanding Performance by an Ensemble in a Comedy Series.

Birbiglia and Aidy Bryant at the 2015 Del Close Marathon discuss comedy, the Upright Citizens Brigade, and comedian Amy Poehler

In 2011, Birbiglia mounted his second one-man show, My Girlfriend's Boyfriend, which ran for four months off-Broadway and won the Lucille Lortel Award for Outstanding Solo Show. He toured My Girlfriend's Boyfriend around the world with tour dates in the United States, Australia, Canada and the United Kingdom. On June 2, 2013, Birbiglia performed it for the last time at Carnegie Hall. My Girlfriend's Boyfriend was featured as the number one stand-up special of 2013 by Vulture, Paste, The Laugh Button and Laughspin. It was also named one of Time Out New York's Best Comedy Specials of 2013. Flavorwire listed the special as one of the top 20 funniest stand-up specials of all time.

For his second film, Birbiglia drew upon his early experience with improv in Don't Think Twice (2016), which centers on a fictional Manhattan improv troupe. Birbligia also stars among an ensemble cast including Keegan-Michael Key, Gillian Jacobs, Kate Micucci, Tami Sagher, and Chris Gethard. The film was nominated for several awards, including the Critics' Choice Award for Best Comedy and St. Louis Film Critics Association award for Best Comedy.

Birbiglia's Thank God for Jokes comedy special was released on Netflix on February 28, 2017.

In April 2017, Birbiglia announced a tour of his newest show titled The New One. The tour started with 25 cities and, in December 2017, featured a limited podcast titled The Old Ones. The podcast features Mike Birbiglia analyzing his old stand-up with guests including his brother Joe Birbiglia, comedians Pete Holmes and John Mulaney, film producer and director Judd Apatow, contributor to 'This American Life' Ira Glass and his wife. The New One made its off-Broadway debut at the Cherry Lane Theatre on July 26 and was scheduled to run through August 2 before a high demand for tickets extended the show's run to and through August 26.

The show then received a Broadway transfer, with performances beginning October 25, 2018 and running through January 20, 2019 at the Cort Theatre.

In March 2020, Birbiglia created a charity initiative called "Tip Your Waitstaff" with fellow comics to raise money for comedy clubs closed because of COVID-19.

Birbiglia is a regular contributor to the Public Radio International-distributed program This American Life.

Birbiglia temporarily replaced Jimmy Kimmel for a short time in 2022, as Kimmel recovered from COVID-19.

In 2022, Birbiglia premiered his show titled The Old Man and the Pool at the Steppenwolf Theatre Company in Chicago, where it ran from April 28 to May 22. He later opened the show on Broadway at the Vivian Beaumont Theater, where it ran from November 13, 2022, to January 15, 2023, and at the Wyndham's Theatre in London's West End between September 12, 2023, and October 7, 2023. The show premiered on Netflix on November 21, 2023, to positive reviews. His fourth Netflix special, "The Good Life," premiered on May 26, 2025.

== Personal life ==
Birbiglia has rapid eye movement sleep behavior disorder, which causes him to live out his dreams and sleepwalk. While asleep in a motel room in Walla Walla, Washington, he ran through a second-story window. As a result of the accident, Birbiglia received 33 stitches in his leg. His show, a story on This American Life, and subsequent film Sleepwalk with Me largely centers around this event. He also had a tumor on his bladder at the age of 19.

Birbiglia is married to Jen Stein, whose pen name is J. Hope Stein, and whose poetry is featured in The New One. They have one daughter born in 2015.

== Filmography ==
=== Film ===
Year	Title	Role	Notes
2010	Going the Distance	Toby the Waiter	
2011	Cedar Rapids	Trent	
2011	Your Sister's Sister	Al	
2012	Sleepwalk with Me	Matt Pandamiglio	Also director, writer
2014	The Fault in Our Stars	Patrick	
2014	Adult Beginners	Braden	
2014	Digging for Fire	Phil	
2014	Annie	Social services inspector	
2015	Hot Pursuit	Steve	
2015	Trainwreck	Tom	
2016	Popstar: Never Stop Never Stopping	Blond CMZ Reporter	
2016	Don't Think Twice	Miles	Also director, writer, producer
2016	Tramps	Scott	
2017	The Guardian Brothers	The Health Inspector	English version; voice
2022	A Man Called Otto	Real Estate Agent	
2027	The Comeback King		Filming

=== Television ===
Year	Title	Role	Notes
2003	LOL with The N	Host	4 episodes
2012	Girls	Brian	Episode: "Vagina Panic"
2014–2015	Inside Amy Schumer	Various	2 episodes: "Slow Your Roll" and "Wingwoman"
2015–2016	Orange Is the New Black	Danny Pearson	12 episodes
2017	Broad City	Richard Miller	Episode: "House-Sitting"
2018–2020	Billions	Oscar Langstraat	7 episodes
2018–2021	Summer Camp Island	Howard (voice)	15 episodes
2020	The Shivering Truth	(voice)	Episode: "The Burn Earner Spits"
2022	Human Resources	Barry (voice)	4 episodes
2024	Good One: A Show About Jokes	Himself	Documentary

=== Standup specials ===
Year	Title	Notes
2004	Comedy Central Presents: Mike Birbiglia	
2008	What I Should Have Said Was Nothing	two related comedy albums also released
2013	My Girlfriend's Boyfriend	also released as a comedy album
2017	Thank God for Jokes	Netflix Originals special
2019	The New One	Netflix Originals special
2023	The Old Man & The Pool	Netflix Originals special
2025	The Good Life	Netflix Originals special

=== Music videos ===
Year	Title	Performer(s)	Album
2022	"Anti-Hero"	Taylor Swift	Midnights

== Discography ==
Audio releases (physical and/or digital formats)

Main

- 2004: Dog Years (out of print) (self-produced, winner of the "Just Plain Folks" comedy album of the year)
- 2005: My Secret Public Album (the best of Birbiglia's "Secret Public Journals" weekly guest spots on The Bob and Tom Show)
- 2006: Two Drink Mike
- 2007: My Secret Public Journal Live
- 2011: Sleepwalk with Me Live
- 2013: My Girlfriend's Boyfriend
- 2019: Thank God For Jokes (vinyl)

Compilations

- 2005: Invite Them Up (Comedy Central Records CD/DVD compilation of indie comics)

== Theater ==
All Netflix specials, as well as the film Sleepwalk With Me, were originally solo plays performed worldwide.

Title	Opening Date	Theater
Sleepwalk with Me	November 11, 2008	Bleeker Street Theater (later Lynn Redgrave Theater, now defunct), New York
My Girlfriend's Boyfriend	March 31, 2011	Barrow Street Theatre (now Greenwich House Theater), New York
Thank God for Jokes	February 11, 2016	Lynn Redgrave Theater, New York
The New One	August 2, 2018	Cherry Lane Theatre, New York
The Old Man and the Pool	August 3, 2022	Mark Taper Forum, Los Angeles
The Good Life	March 19, 2025	Beacon Theatre, New York

== Awards and nominations ==
Year	Award	Category	Title	Result
2003	ECNY Award	Stand-up comedy	Best Male Stand-up	Won
2009	Nightlife Awards	Outstanding Comedian in a Major Engagement	Sleepwalk with Me	Won
2009	Outer Critics Circle	Outstanding Solo Performance	Sleepwalk with Me	Nominated
2009	Lucille Lortel	Outstanding Solo Show	Sleepwalk with Me	Nominated
2009	Drama Desk	Outstanding Solo Performance	Sleepwalk with Me	Nominated
2011	Lucille Lortel	Outstanding Solo Show	My Girlfriend's Boyfriend	Won
2011	Outer Critics Circle Award	Outstanding Solo Performance	My Girlfriend's Boyfriend	Nominated
2011	Drama Desk	Outstanding Solo Performance	My Girlfriend's Boyfriend	Nominated
2011	Thurber Prize	American Humor	Sleepwalk with Me and Other Painfully True Stories	Finalist
2012	Sundance Film Festival	Audience Award - Best of NEXT	Sleepwalk with Me	Won
2012	Gotham Awards	Breakthrough Actor	Sleepwalk with Me	Nominated
2014	American Comedy Awards	Comedy Special of The Year	My Girlfriend's Boyfriend	Nominated
2016	Screen Actors Guild Award	Outstanding Ensemble in a Comedy Series	Orange is the New Black	Won
2016	Lucille Lortel	Outstanding Solo Show	Thank God for Jokes	Nominated
2016	Outer Critics Circle	Outstanding Solo Performance	Thank God for Jokes	Nominated
2017	Just For Laughs Awards	Stand-Up Comedian of the Year	N/A	Won
2017	Kurt Vonnegut Humor Award	N/A	N/A	Won
2019	Drama Desk Award	Outstanding Solo Performance	The New One	Won
2019	Outer Critics Circle	Outstanding Solo Performance	The New One	Won
2019	Lucille Lortel	Outstanding Solo Show	The New One	Nominated
2021	Thurber Prize	American Humor	The New One: Painfully True Stories From A Reluctant Dad	Finalist
2024	Critics' Choice Television Awards	Best Comedy Special	The Old Man & The Pool	Nominated
2024	Primetime Emmy Awards	Outstanding Writing for a Variety Special	The Old Man & The Pool	Nominated
