= Scott Campbell (tattoo artist) =

American tattoo artist

- Born: May 13, 1977 (age 49)
- Known for: Tattoo, mixed media
- Spouse: Lake Bell (m. 2013; sep. 2020)
- Children: 2
- Website: www.scottcampbellstudio.com

Scott Campbell (born May 13, 1977) is an American artist and tattoo artist whose clients include Howard Stern, Sting, Robert Downey Jr., Courtney Love, Orlando Bloom, Josh Hartnett, and Marc Jacobs.

== Early life ==
Campbell grew up in New Orleans, Louisiana, with a conservative upbringing in a Southern Baptist family, that sparked his search for something different. He graduated in 1995 from Kingwood High School. Early on, Campbell debated the idea of a middle-class life. At the University of Texas, he studied biochemistry and planned a career as a medical illustrator. Soon he dropped out.

== Career ==
In his 20s, Campbell moved to San Francisco and began working as a copy editor for Lawrence Ferlinghetti, at City Lights Bookstore. It was then that he began tattooing. He traveled Asia and Europe, where he tattooed for cash, then moved to Williamsburg in 2001.

When he moved to New York in 2005 he opened his own tattoo shop, called Saved Tattoo. It was here that Campbell's career led to fame. His first celebrity client was Heath Ledger, who commissioned a small bird in flight on his left forearm.

As a visual artist, Campbell is best known for a series of reliefs he creates using sheets of uncirculated US currency. He exhibits regularly internationally; his first show sold out at OHWOW, a gallery in Miami, Florida (April 2009). The gallery opened a location in New York at which Campbell had a solo show in April 2010. His solo exhibition "Bless This Mess" took place at their Zurich location in January 2012.

Campbell collaborated with Louis Vuitton, customizing leather bags for a men's line for the 2011 spring/summer collection.

In November 2015, Campbell debuted 'Whole Glory' at Milk Studios in New York City. The project saw 23 participants getting tattooed by Campbell through a hole in a wall. The participants did not communicate at all with the artist prior to being tattooed and he tattooed a piece of his choice. Whole Glory was also presented in Los Angeles, in Downtown LA, Moscow at the Garage Museum of Contemporary Art, and most recently at Covent Garden in London, presented by Lazarides Gallery. 'Whole Glory' London also debuted a series of tattooed pig skins sewn together with Campbell's designs encased in stainless steel frames in liquid preservative.

== Personal life ==
Campbell met actress Lake Bell on the set of her HBO show How to Make It in America in 2011. They were married on June 1, 2013, in New Orleans. In late October 2014, her representative confirmed that Bell had given birth to their daughter, Nova. In May 2017, Bell gave birth to their second child, a son named Ozzi, which is short for Ozgood. They separated in 2020.

== Exhibitions ==
- Whole Glory (October 2016), Lazarides, London
- Bless This Mess (January 2012), Zürich
- Noblesse Oblige (March 19 – April 22, 2011), Los Angeles
- Make It Rain (April 11 – May 9, 2009), Miami
