= The Film Arcade =

American film production company

- Type: Private
- Industry: Entertainment
- Founded: 2012
- Founder: Miranda Bailey, Jason Beck, Andy Bohn
- Headquarters: 360 N. La Cienega Blvd. Third Floor Los Angeles, CA, U.S.
- Services: Film Production and Film Distribution
- Number of employees: 11-50
- Website: www.thefilmarcade.com

The Film Arcade is an independent American film production and distribution company based in Los Angeles.

== History ==
Founded in 2012 by Miranda Bailey, Jason Beck and Andy Bohn, The Film Arcade recently released Mike Birbiglia's Don't Think Twice starring Keegan-Michael Key and Gillian Jacobs as well as Josh Mond's James White starring Christopher Abbott, Cynthia Nixon and Scott "Kid Cudi" Mescudi. Previous films include Jim Strouse's People Places Things starring Jemaine Clement, Kris Swanberg's Unexpected starring Cobie Smulders and Anders Holm, Song One starring Anne Hathaway, A.C.O.D. starring Adam Scott, Richard Jenkins, Catherine O'Hara, Clark Duke, Jessica Alba, Jane Lynch and Amy Poehler and Joey Soloway's Afternoon Delight starring Kathryn Hahn, Juno Temple, Josh Radnor and Jane Lynch. The Film Arcade recently financed and produced Lake Bell's I Do...Until I Don't which stars Bell, Ed Helms, Paul Reiser, Mary Steenburgen, Amber Heard, Wyatt Cenac and Dolly Wells. The film will be released in 2017.

The Film Arcade has a home entertainment distribution deal with Universal Pictures and frequently handles theatrical distribution for Paramount and Lionsgate on their "day and date" releases.

== Filmography ==
Film	Release date
The Other Dream Team	September 28, 2012
Simon & The Oaks	October 12, 2012
The Haunting in Connecticut 2: Ghosts of Georgia	February 1, 2013
Raputure-Palooza	June 7, 2013
The Frozen Ground	August 23, 2013
Afternoon Delight	August 30, 2013
Empire State	August 30, 2013
A.C.O.D.	October 4, 2013
Ghost Team One	October 11, 2013
Hellbenders	October 18, 2013
Spinning Plates	October 23, 2013
Angels Sing	November 1, 2013
Hours	December 13, 2013
Reasonable Doubt	January 17, 2014
Enemies Closer	January 24, 2014
Nurse 3D	February 7, 2014
Date and Switch	February 14, 2014
Angriest Man in Brooklyn	May 23, 2014
Burning Blue	June 6, 2014
They Came Together	June 27, 2014
School Dance	July 2, 2014
My Man Is a Loser	July 25, 2014
Dinosaur 13	August 15, 2014
The Prince	August 22, 2014
Leprecahun: Origins	August 22, 2014
Reclaim	September 19, 2014
Exists	October 3, 2014
Jessabelle	November 7, 2014
Dying of the Light	December 5, 2014
Vice	January 16, 2015
Song One	January 23, 2015
Wild Card	January 30, 2015
The Voices	February 6, 2015
Love, Rosie	February 6, 2015
Cymbeline	March 13, 2015
Night Light	March 27, 2015
Last Knights	March 3, 2015
Absolution	May 15, 2015
Vendetta	June 12, 2015
What We Did On Our Holiday	July 10, 2015
Unexpected	July 24, 2015
People Places Things	August 14, 2015
12 Rounds 3: Lockdown	September 10, 2015
Ashby	September 25, 2015
The Condemned 2	November 6, 2015
James White	November 13, 2015
Code of Honor	May 6, 2016
Don't Think Twice	July 22, 2016
Goat	September 23, 2016
End of the Gun	September 23, 2016
Contract To Kill	December 9, 2016
Altitude	March 14, 2017
I Do... Until I Don't	September 1, 2017
Family	April 19, 2019
