= Lake Bell =

American actress (born 1979)

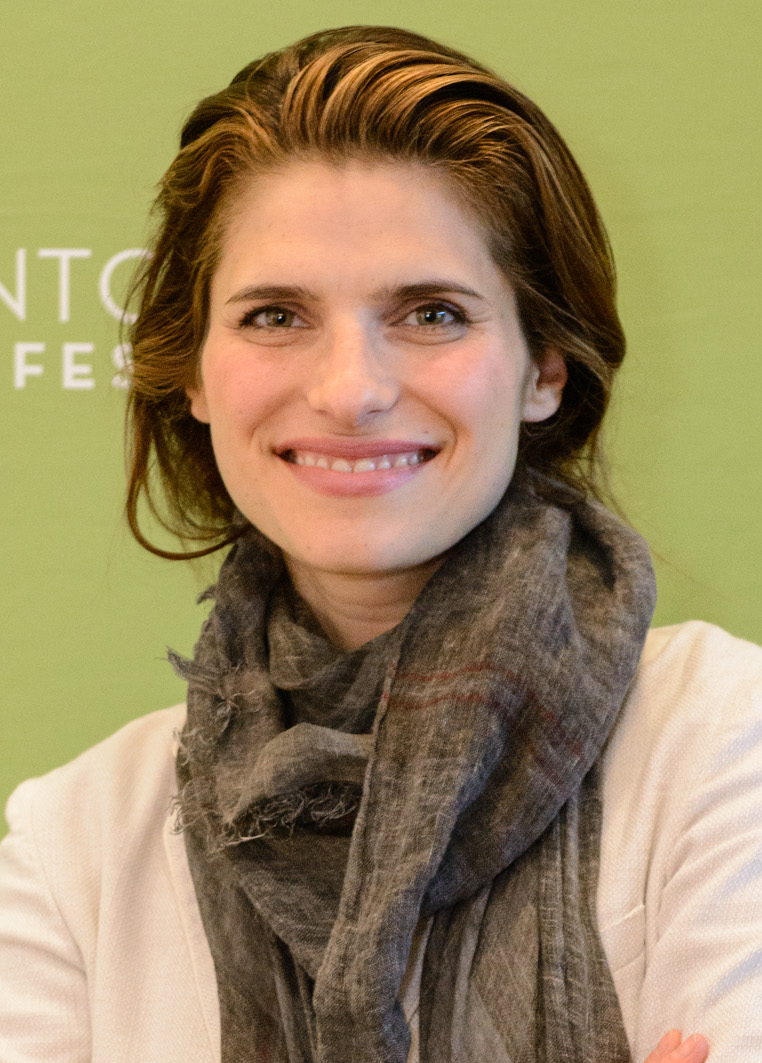
- Bell at the 2013 Montclair Film Festival
- Born: Lake Siegel Bell; March 24, 1979 (age 47); New York City, U.S.
- Education: Skidmore College; Rose Bruford College (BA)
- Occupations: Actress, director, screenwriter
- Years active: 2002–present
- Agent: Gersh
- Spouse: Scott Campbell (m. 2013; sep. 2020)
- Children: 2

Lake Siegel Bell (born March 24, 1979) is an American actress, screenwriter, and director. She has appeared in various television series, including Boston Legal (2004–2006), Surface (2005–2006), How to Make It in America (2010–2011), Childrens Hospital (2008–2016), and Bless This Mess (2019–2020) and in films including Over Her Dead Body (2008), What Happens in Vegas (2008), It's Complicated (2009), No Strings Attached (2011), Million Dollar Arm (2014), No Escape (2015), Man Up (2015), The Secret Life of Pets (2016), Shot Caller (2017), Home Again (2017), Spider-Man: Into the Spider-Verse (2018) and The Secret Life of Pets 2 (2019).

She wrote and directed the short film Worst Enemy, which debuted at the Sundance Film Festival in 2012, followed by her 2013 feature film directing debut, In a World..., in which she also starred. In 2017, she directed, wrote, co-produced, and starred in I Do... Until I Don't. She voiced Poison Ivy in the HBO Max series Harley Quinn (2019–2025), and appeared in the Marvel Cinematic Universe as Black Widow in the Disney+ series What If...? (2021–2024) and X-Men '97 (2026), and as Dr. Graham in the film Black Panther: Wakanda Forever (2022).

== Early life ==
Lake Siegel Bell was born on March 24, 1979, in New York City. Her mother, Robin Bell, owns the design firm Robin Bell Design in New York. Her father is real estate developer Harvey Siegel. He bought the Virginia International Raceway after it had closed, and converted it to a racetrack country club. He also owned New Jersey Motorsports Park.

Bell's father is Jewish and her mother is Protestant. Bell has stated that she was raised in a "comically dysfunctional" family.

Bell attended The Chapin School in New York and Westminster School in Simsbury, Connecticut. As a high school junior, Bell attended School Year Abroad (SYA) at its school located in Rennes, France. For part of her teenage years, she lived in Vero Beach, Florida and attended Saint Edwards School. She attended Skidmore College in Saratoga Springs, New York, but decided to focus on acting and transferred to Rose Bruford College in London, which emphasized theater and the arts.

At Rose Bruford, she acted in theatrical productions including The Seagull, The Children's Hour, Six Degrees of Separation, Light Shining in Buckinghamshire and The Pentecost.

== Career ==
=== Actress ===
Bell began her career in 2002 with roles in the film Speakeasy, a film about two men who become unlikely friends after a minor traffic accident, and in two episodes of the TV medical drama ER. After appearing in the psychological thriller I Love Your Work, she was cast alongside Jeff Goldblum as the female lead in the NBC television film War Stories. She next played Alicia Silverstone's wisecracking best friend, Victoria Carlson, in NBC's comedy-drama series Miss Match. In 2004, Bell appeared in the wrestling film Slammed and made her debut as Sally Heep in the final four episodes of the series The Practice. Her character was carried over into the spinoff Boston Legal, where she was a regular cast member until she left the series in 2005. She also appeared alongside Dustin Hoffman in an Audi commercial that spoofed his well-known film The Graduate.

Bell played the lead role in the science fiction series Surface, which aired between September 2005 and May 2006. She also starred in the film Rampage: The Hillside Strangler Murders (2006) about the Hillside Strangler of the late 1970s; and returned to Boston Legal for two episodes, reprising her role as Sally Heep, opposing counsel to Alan Shore (portrayed by James Spader). In 2008, she played the female lead in the thriller Under Still Waters, for which she won the Newport Beach Film Festival Award for Outstanding Performance in Acting. She also starred alongside Paul Rudd and Eva Longoria in the romantic comedy Over Her Dead Body, played the best friend of Cameron Diaz's character in the romantic comedy What Happens in Vegas; and played the wife of Colin Farrell's character in the crime drama Pride and Glory.

She was cast as the lead female role, Dr. Cat Black, in Rob Corddry's satirical comedy Childrens Hospital. The fourth season began airing in August 2012 and featured two episodes that were directed by Bell: the season premiere, "The Boy with the Pancakes Tattoo", a parody of the film The Girl With the Dragon Tattoo; and the ninth episode, "A Kid Walks in to a Hospital".

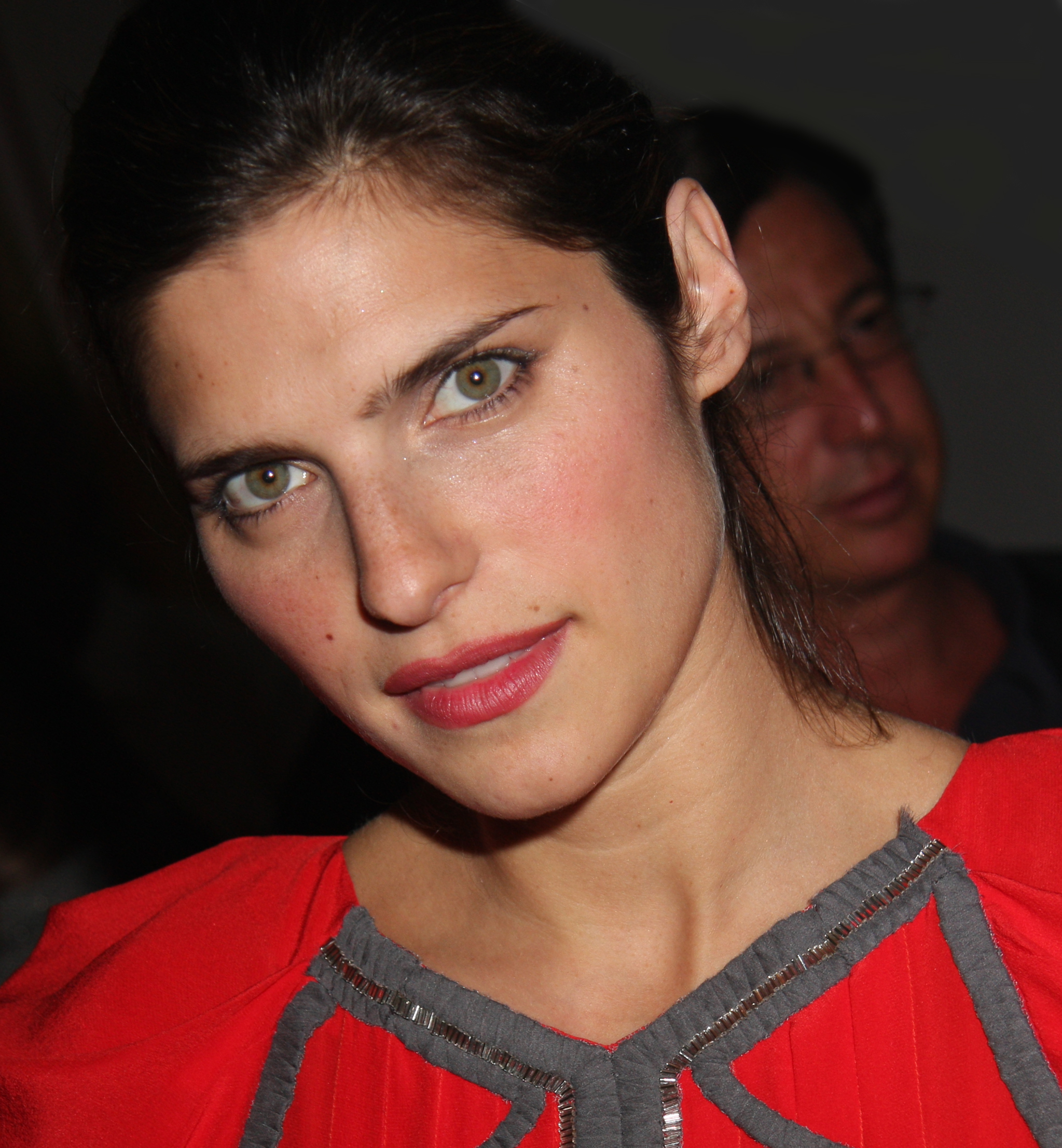
Bell in June 2009

In 2009, Bell voiced the role of Dana Mercer in the video game Prototype. That year she also played Alec Baldwin's wife in the romantic comedy It's Complicated and guest starred in an episode of the fourth season of the series Wainy Days. In 2010 Bell voiced a supporting role in Shrek Forever After, starred in the satirical film Burning Palms, guest starred in an episode of the second season of the sitcom The League, and was cast as a lead character in the HBO series How to Make It in America, which aired for two seasons from February 2010 to November 2011. Bell was to play Deputy Judy Hicks in Scream 4, but dropped out four days before filming due to scheduling conflicts, with the role going to Marley Shelton.

In 2011, Bell starred alongside Josh Lucas and Terrence Howard in the supernatural thriller Little Murder, played Ashton Kutcher's boss in the romantic comedy No Strings Attached, a performance that won her critical praise and was called "scene-stealing"; starred in the ensemble comedy A Good Old Fashioned Orgy; and guest starred in an episode of the first season of New Girl. Bell had a lead role alongside Kate Bosworth in the 2012 thriller Black Rock.

In 2021, Bell lent her voice to the adult animated film Cryptozoo. In 2024, Bell was cast as Lisa in Miles Levin's directorial debut, Under The Lights. In 2025, Bell appeared in the HBO series The Chair Company where she plays Barb Trosper, the wife of Ron.

=== Writer and director ===
In 2010, Bell made her writing and directing début with the short film Worst Enemy, which starred Michaela Watkins, Matt Walsh and Lindsay Sloane. Her film débuted at the 2011 Sundance Film Festival and has also played at the Nantucket Film Festival, the Dallas International Film Festival, the Gen Art Film Festival and Aspen Shortsfest, winning the Tony Cox Award for Screenwriting in a Short Film from Nantucket and receiving a Shorts Jury Special Mention from Dallas. Her film led to her being named one of the "2012 Inspiring Filmmakers" by LUNAFEST. Speaking on the film, Bell stated:

The film is about a milk-drinking, lactose-intolerant misanthrope on a quest for real human connection. Being an ordinary, unoriginal and unloved woman, she instead becomes so wrapped up in her own quiet neurosis that she finds herself physically stuck in a full body girdle. I wrote and directed Worst Enemy in 2010 as an experiment to see if I could take on being a filmmaker

Bell made her writing and directing feature film debut at the 2013 Sundance Film Festival with In a World.... which she wrote and directed and in which she starred. She describes the film as "a comedy about a female voice-over artist and family dysfunction and relationships. I’m obsessed with the voice-over world, so it makes sense for me." The film was picked up by Roadside Attractions and Sony.

In February 2014 she said her next project would be What's the Point? (And Other Fair Questions About Marriage), a film she would write and direct, which was eventually renamed I Do... Until I Don't and released in 2017 to mixed reviews.

Bell also has a number of television directing credits, including two 2017 episodes of the Hulu comedy-drama series Casual, two 2019 episodes of the ABC sitcom Bless This Mess (a show in which she co-created and starred), and two episodes of the 2022 Hulu biographical miniseries Pam & Tommy.

April 2026, Bell signed with Gersh for representation.

=== Modeling ===
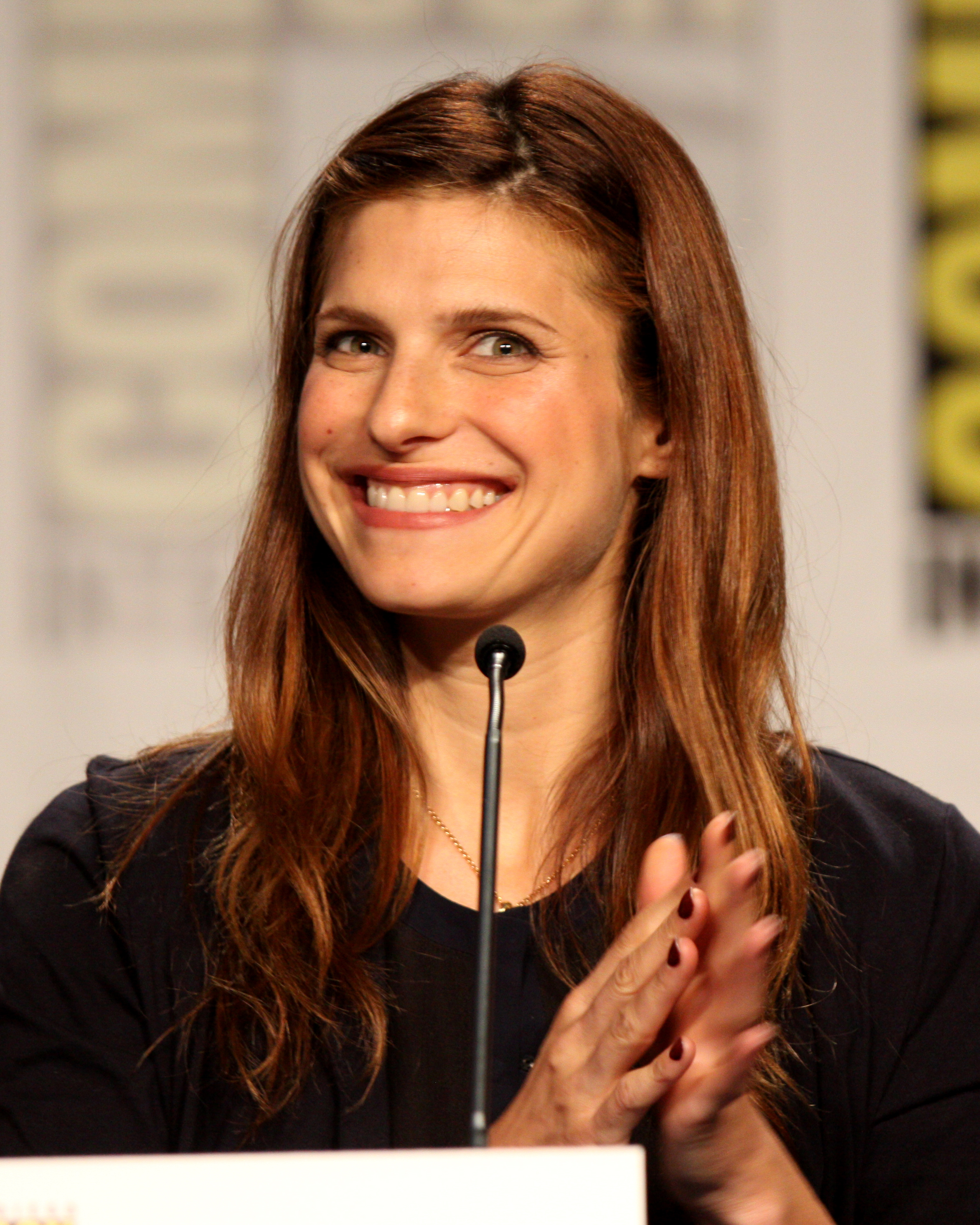
Bell in July 2011

Bell was listed as number 45 on Femme Fatales' list of the 50 Sexiest Women of 2003; 6th on British Vogue's list of the 10 Best Dressed Women of 2007, 32nd on Maxim's Hot 100 of 2008, 44th on Maxim's Hot 100 of 2012 and 89th on AskMen's 99 Most Desirable Women of 2012.

In 2007, Bell appeared in a photo shoot for GQ; in 2008 she appeared in a photo shoot for Marie Claire; in 2009 she modeled for Scott Caan, for his first book, Scott Caan Photographs, Vol. 1; and in 2011 she appeared in photo shoots for Elle, Los Angeles, Maxim and Esquire, the latter in conjunction with the website Me In My Place. In September 2011, Bell modeled at Pirelli's Fashion Week in Milan, Italy. For New York Fashion Week 2013, Bell modeled nude with strategic body painting (done by her husband) on the cover of New York shot by Mark Seliger. In April 2014, Bell appeared in Esquire for the second time.

=== Other activities ===
Bell has an automotive column in The Hollywood Reporter called "Test Drive" and is the magazine's automotive contributing editor. In 2022, her book Inside Voice—on the topic of the human voice—was published.

== Personal life ==
In 2011, Bell began dating Scott Campbell, an artist and tattoo artist. The two met when he played himself in an episode of the second season of How to Make It in America. The couple became engaged on Bell's birthday in March 2012 and were married on June 1, 2013, at the Marigny Opera House in New Orleans, Louisiana. In late October 2014, her representative confirmed that Bell had given birth to their daughter, Nova. In May 2017, Bell gave birth to their second child, a son named Ozgood. In October 2020, the couple announced that they were separating, with Bell filing for divorce on October 28, 2020. On July 7, 2022, it was reported that Bell started dating comedian and actor Chris Rock. Rock later confirmed in his 2023 Netflix special that he was single.

== Filmography ==
=== Film ===
Lake Bell film work
Year	Title	Role	Notes
2002	Speakeasy	Sara Marnikov	
2003	War Stories	Nora Stone	
2003	I Love Your Work	Felicia	
2004	Fresh Out of Tears	Leila	Short film
2004	Slammed	Gina Micelli	
2006	Rampage: The Hillside Strangler Murders	Jillian Dunne	Direct-to-video
2008	Under Still Waters	Charlie	Newport Beach Film Festival Award for Outstanding Performance in Acting
2008	Over Her Dead Body	Ashley	
2008	What Happens in Vegas	Tipper	
2008	Pride and Glory	Megan Egan	
2008	Prop 8: The Musical	Scary Catholic School Girls From Hell	Short film for Funny or Die
2009	It's Complicated	Agness Adler	National Board of Review Award for Best Acting by an Ensemble
2010	Shrek Forever After	Patrol Witch / Wagon Witch #2	Voice
2010	Burning Palms	Mary Jane	
2010	The Doctors of Childrens Hospital Answer Your Medical Questions	Dr. Blake Black	Short film for Funny or Die
2010	10 Minutes	Herself	Short film for Funny or Die
2010	Worst Enemy	—N/a	Short film; writer and director Tony Cox Award for Screenwriting in a Short Film, Nantucket Film Festival; Shorts Jury Special Mention, Dallas International Film Festival
2011	Little Murder	Corey Little	
2011	No Strings Attached	Lucy	
2011	A Good Old Fashioned Orgy	Alison Cohen	
2011	Home for Actresses	Lake	Short film for Funny or Die
2012	Black Rock	Louise	
2012	El Tonto	—N/a	Short film; writer and director
2013	In a World...	Carol Solomon	Also writer, director, and producer Waldo Salt Screenwriting Award, Sundance Film Festival 2013
2014	Mr. Peabody & Sherman	Mona Lisa	Voice
2014	Million Dollar Arm	Brenda Paauwe Bernstein	
2015	Man Up	Nancy Patterson	
2015	No Escape	Annie Dwyer	
2016	The Secret Life of Pets	Chloe	Voice
2017	Shot Caller	Kate Harlon	
2017	Home Again	Zoey Bell	
2017	I Do... Until I Don't	Alice Brewing	Also writer, director, and producer
2018	Time of Day	Herself	Short film
2018	Spider-Man: Into the Spider-Verse	Vanessa Fisk	Voice
2019	The Secret Life of Pets 2	Chloe	Voice
2021	Cryptozoo	Lauren Grey	Voice
2022	Summering	Laura	
2022	Black Panther: Wakanda Forever	Dr. Graham	
2023	Mother, Couch	Anne	
2025	Under the Lights	Lisa	

=== Television ===
Lake Bell television work
Year	Title	Role	Notes
2002	ER	Jody Holmes	Episodes: "One Can Only Hope" and "Tell Me Where It Hurts"
2003	Miss Match	Victoria Carlson	Main role; 18 episodes
2004	The Practice	Sally Heep	4 episodes
2004–2006	Boston Legal	Sally Heep	Main role (season 1); guest star (season 3); 14 episodes
2005–2006	Surface	Laura Daughtery	Main role; 15 episodes
2008–2016	Childrens Hospital	Dr. Cat Black	Main role; 57 episodes; also director
2009	Wainy Days	Blaire	Episode: "Dance Club"
2010	The League	Brooke	Episode: "The White Knuckler"
2010–2011	How to Make It in America	Rachel Chapman	Main role; 16 episodes
2011	New Girl	Amanda	Episode: "Naked"
2012	Top Gear	Herself	Episode: "Rut's Show"
2012	Tron: Uprising	Lux	Voice; episode: "Identity"
2012	Robot Chicken	Black Widow / Ariel	Voice; episode: "Collateral Damage in Gang Turf War"
2013	Newsreaders	Dixie Peters	Episode: "Hair Razing"
2015	Axe Cop	Axe Girl	Voice; episode: "Ultimate Mate"
2015	Wet Hot American Summer: First Day of Camp	Donna	Main role; 7 episodes
2015–2018	BoJack Horseman	Katrina Peanutbutter	Voice; 9 episodes
2016	Cassius & Clay	Shopcarter Clay	Voice; unsold television pilot
2017	Casual	—N/a	Director; 2 episodes
2017	Wet Hot American Summer: Ten Years Later	Donna	Recurring role; 5 episodes
2017	SuperMansion	Millicent	Voice; episode: "SuperMansion: Drag Me to Halloween"
2019–2025	Harley Quinn	Dr. Pamela Isley / Poison Ivy / Barbara Eileen-Gordon / various voices	Voice; main role
2019–2020	Bless This Mess	Rio Levine-Young	26 episodes; also executive producer, creator, writer, and director
2019	Drunk History	Belva Gaertner	Episode: "Femme Fatales"
2020	Medical Police	Dr. Blake Black	4 episodes
2020	Make It Work!	Herself	Television special
2021–2023	What If...?	Natasha Romanoff / Black Widow	Voice; 5 episodes
2022	Pam & Tommy	—N/a	Director; 2 episodes
2022	American Dad!	Various voices	2 episodes
2024	Kite Man: Hell Yeah!	Poison Ivy / Cheetah	Voice; episode: "Pilot, Hell Yeah!"
2025	Phineas and Ferb	Katherine Marshall	Voice; episode: "Out of Character"
2025	The Chair Company	Barb Trosper	8 episodes
2026	X-Men '97	Natasha Romanoff / Black Widow	Voice; Episode: "Rise of Apocalypse: Part 2"

=== Video games ===
Lake Bell video game work
Year	Title	Role	Notes
2009	Prototype	Dana Mercer	Voice
