= Tami Sagher =

American actress

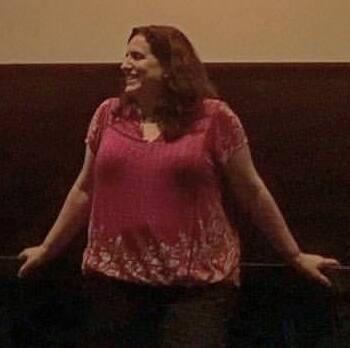
- Sagher at Don't Think Twice premiere in 2016
- Education: University of Chicago
- Occupations: Writer; actress; comedian
- Years active: 1996–present

Tami Sagher is an American comedy writer, producer, and actress.

== Biography ==
A native of Chicago, Sagher studied mathematics at the University of Chicago before joining Boom Chicago and then Second City.

== Career ==
=== TV ===
Sagher has written for the TV shows 30 Rock, Psych, MADtv, Broad City, Girls, and Inside Amy Schumer. She was a staff writer on the CBS sitcom How I Met Your Mother, leaving before the show's final season.

Sagher then spent two seasons as writer-producer on the Netflix series Orange is the New Black. From 2020 to 2021, Sagher was a writer-executive producer on the Hulu series Shrill.

=== National Public Radio ===
In addition, Sagher has contributed to This American Life.

=== Performance ===
Her performing includes playing an improv performer in Don't Think Twice, starring in the short film The Shabbos Goy, as well as various appearances on TV sitcoms and sketch shows. In particular, she appeared in Season 5 of Curb Your Enthusiasm.

== Honors ==
Sagher has been nominated for 4 Writers Guild of America Awards:

- Three for MADtv;
- One (2008 in the category of Best Comedy Series) for the third season of 30 Rock.
