= Mike Birbiglia: My Girlfriend's Boyfriend =

2013 television special directed by Seth Barrish

- Written by: Mike Birbiglia; Joe Birbiglia
- Directed by: Seth Barrish
- Starring: Mike Birbiglia
- Country of origin: United States
- Original language: English

Production
- Running time: 76 minutes

Original release
- Network: Netflix
- Release: September 4, 2013

Mike Birbiglia: My Girlfriend's Boyfriend is a 2013 American stand-up comedy film directed by Seth Barrish, and written by Mike Birbiglia and his brother Joe Birbiglia. Filmed for Netflix at the Intiman Theater in Seattle, Mike Birbiglia talks about his first kiss, his first girlfriend, his first time making a crush laugh hard, and more.

== Synopsis ==
The show begins with Birbiglia explaining that he is against the idea of marriage, leading to him and his friend Andy trying to put a stop to their friends getting married around their early thirties. Birbiglia talks about how he feels he must be right in arguments and has trouble letting little things go. One day in February 2007, Birbiglia has an argument with his girlfriend Jenny and talks with Andy about breaking up with her. Shortly after, Birbiglia is involved in a car accident while leaving Andy's house in Los Angeles.

Birbiglia goes into detail about how he met Jenny while doing a show in St. Louis and the two went out to an Irish pub with Andy. Birbiglia attempted to kiss Jenny towards the end of the night and was rejected, so he goes into detail about failed kisses in the past. In middle school, he invited his crush to go to the carnival with him but he vomited while riding the scrambler and did not get to kiss her that evening. A few years later in high school, he lied to his friends about having had his first kiss and eventually had his first kiss with a girl named Sondra at a school dance. Later, he found out from his friend that Sondra wasn't returning his calls because he was a terrible kisser, and he didn't want to tell his friends the truth about why.

Jenny agrees to go out with him again in New York City, where both of them live. They start building a relationship and go on a vacation to Bermuda where they start to open up to each other. Birbiglia laments that his punctual nature is at odds with Jenny's lackadaisical attitude towards arriving on time. The two admit that they don't see themselves getting married, though Jenny often ends her arguments by saying "that's how I feel." Birbiglia admits the two are falling in love and tells the audience about his high school girlfriend, Amanda. Amanda was a delinquent and Birbiglia was very well-behaved, leading him to think it's an "opposites-attract" situation. Later, he finds out that Amanda did not break up with her old boyfriend, frustrating him. He notes that he felt as if he compromised. Back in the present, he finds out that Jenny's old boyfriend is still present in her life and is staying with her parents. Upset over the same thing happening again, the two break up after a fight.

After little contact for six months, Birbiglia caves and calls Jenny, and the two decide to get back together and move in together. One night, the two argue over marriage - Jenny says she would get married, but he goes on a long rant about his feelings. Jenny says that she would still marry him because "that's how she feels," but now he's upset because he's running late for a flight out of Newark Airport for a show in Los Angeles. Birbiglia manages to make it to the gate in time but falls asleep and misses his flight. He has to catch the next flight, missing a show for the first time in his life and deeply upsetting him. He eventually arrives in Los Angeles in a sour mood and won't answer Jenny's calls or texts - Andy persuades him to finally break up with her, and as he is leaving Andy's house, the accident happens.

Birbiglia was hit in the door by a drunk driver and is unharmed, but shaken up. The responding officer has him fill out paperwork as quickly as he can before he returns to Andy's house. He firmly decides that he and Jenny should get married, but Andy tells him to sleep on it. After he returns home, he finds out that the officer didn't fill out the paperwork properly and found him at fault. He hires a private investigator but can't get the officer on the phone. When he finally does, the officer tells him to just "do the right thing" and pay for the drunk driver's vehicle. He starts frenetically building a case over the next few weeks and alienating most of his friends. One night at dinner, while furiously scribbling on a napkin, Jenny tells him that she's just happy he's okay. Birbiglia, acknowledging that he needs to move on and how much the two are in love, drops the case and the two get married in June 2007.

The show closes with Birbiglia saying that he does not believe in marriage, but he believes in Jenny, and has given up on the idea of being right.

== Cast ==
- Mike Birbiglia

== Release ==
The special is currently available from PlutoTV online streaming service.

== Reception ==
My Girlfriend's Boyfriend received critical acclaim and is regarded as some of Birbiglia's best work. The special has a 100% critic rating on Rotten Tomatoes. My Girlfriend's Boyfriend was featured as the number one stand-up special of 2013 by Vulture, Paste, The Laugh Button and Laughspin. It was also named one of Time Out New York's Best Comedy Specials of 2013.

Vulture and Paste later named the special one of the best of the decade. Flavorwire listed the special as one of the top 20 funniest stand-up specials of all time.
