= Hillside Strangler =

Media epithet for American serial killers

The Hillside Stranglers
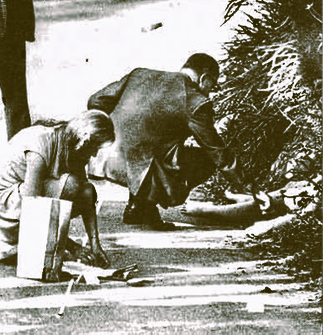
- LAPD investigators process the crime scene of Hillside Strangler victim Lauren Wagner
- Born: Kenneth Alessio Bianchi; May 22, 1951 (age 75); Angelo Buono Jr. October 5, 1934
- Died: Buono: September 21, 2002 (aged 67)
- Motive: Sexual gratification; sexual sadism; possession; misogyny; control
- Convictions: Bianchi: California First degree murder (5 counts) Washington First degree murder (2 counts); Buono: California First degree murder with special circumstances (9 counts)
- Penalty: Bianchi: Life imprisonment (x2) with possibility of parole; Buono: Life imprisonment without possibility of parole

Details
- Victims: 10
- Span of crimes: October 17, 1977 – February 16, 1978
- Country: United States
- State: California
- Date apprehended: Bianchi: January 12, 1979; 47 years ago; Buono: October 22, 1979; 47 years ago

The Hillside Strangler, later the Hillside Stranglers, is the media epithet for one, later discovered to be two, American serial killers who terrorized Los Angeles, California, between October 1977 and February 1978, with the nicknames originating from the fact that many of the victims' bodies were discovered on the wooded hillsides surrounding the city. The perpetrators were identified as cousins Kenneth Bianchi and Angelo Buono Jr.

All except one of the murders were committed in Buono's upholstery shop in Glendale, California. The victims, who ranged in age from 12 to 28, were raped, sodomized, beaten, and sometimes tortured, before being strangled to death with ligature. Their corpses were then cleaned and dumped naked across wooded hillsides in Los Angeles. Buono and Bianchi impersonated police officers to lure their victims from nearby locales, then drove them to Buono's upholstery shop to be raped and killed.

The murders began with the deaths of two prostitutes who were found strangled and dumped naked on hillsides northeast of Los Angeles in October and November 1977. It was not until the deaths of five young women who were not prostitutes, but those who had been abducted from middle-class neighborhoods, that the media attention and subsequent "Hillside Strangler" moniker came to prominence. The murders caused a moral panic among young women who were terrified to go out after dark, as well as being pulled over by police. There were two more deaths in December 1977 and February 1978 before the murders abruptly stopped. An extensive investigation proved fruitless until Bianchi's arrest in January 1979 for the rapes and murders of two more young women in Bellingham, Washington, and the subsequent linking of his past to the Strangler case.

In order to avoid the death penalty, Bianchi named Buono as the other perpetrator of the Hillside Strangler killings and agreed to testify against him, leading to Buono's arrest in October 1979. Bianchi pleaded guilty to five of the murders, for which he was sentenced to life imprisonment with the possibility of parole, two consecutive terms for the Washington murders and five concurrent terms for the California murders. Bianchi is currently serving his sentence at Washington State Penitentiary and was denied parole twice in 2010 and 2025, respectively. Buono pleaded not guilty and was convicted of nine of the murders in November 1983 before being sentenced to life imprisonment without the possibility of parole in January 1984. Buono died of a heart attack on September 21, 2002, at age 67 while serving his sentence at Calipatria State Prison.

== Background ==
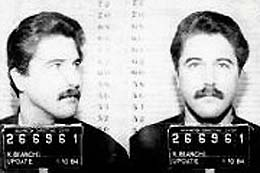
Kenneth Bianchi mugshot in 1979

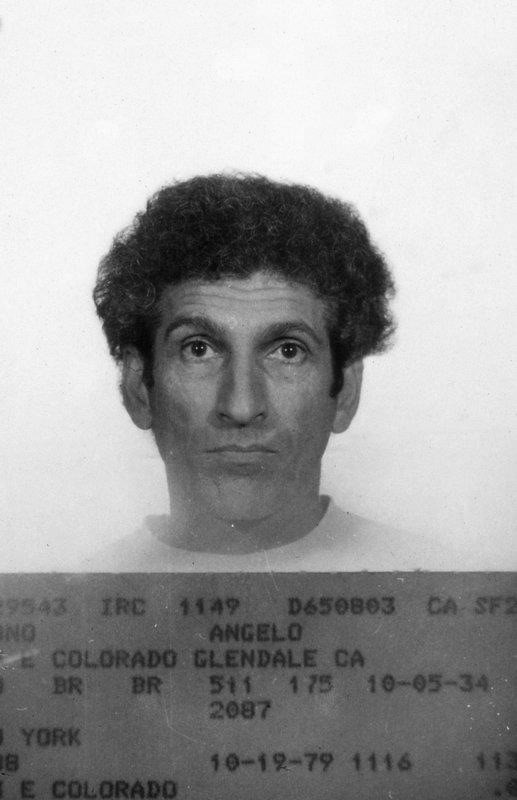
Angelo Buono mugshot

In January 1976, Kenneth Bianchi left Rochester, New York, and moved to Los Angeles, California, to live with his cousin Angelo Buono Jr. Buono provided a strong role model for the docile Bianchi. When Bianchi was short of money, Buono came up with the idea of getting some girls to work for them as prostitutes. Two teenage runaways, Sabra Hannan and Becky Spears, met Bianchi and Buono, and once under their control, were forced to prostitute themselves. Eventually, Spears happened to meet lawyer David Wood, who was appalled at her situation and arranged for her to escape from the city.

Encouraged by Spears' escape, Hannan ran away from Bianchi and Buono a short time later. With their pimping income gone, they decided to find more teenage girls. Impersonating police officers, they eventually found another young woman and installed her in the previous girl's bedroom. Additionally, they purchased (from a prostitute named Deborah Noble) a supposed "trick list" with names of men who frequented prostitutes. Noble and her friend, Yolanda Washington, delivered the trick list to Buono in October 1977.

== Murders ==
=== Yolanda Washington ===
The nude body of the first Hillside Strangler victim, 19-year-old Yolanda Washington, a sex worker and part-time waitress, was found on October 18, 1977, on a hillside near the Ventura Freeway. Detectives determined that her corpse was cleaned before being dumped, while faint marks were also visible around the neck, wrists, and ankles, signs of a rope being used, and she had been assaulted, raped, and strangled.

According to Bianchi, they picked Washington up from a street corner on Sunset Boulevard and Detroit Street the previous evening in Bianchi's Cadillac. Buono, who was in the driver's seat, flashed his badge and handcuffed her, after which Bianchi stripped her, raped her, and strangled her to death after a brief struggle.

=== Judith Miller ===
On November 1, 1977, police were called to Alta Terrace Drive in La Crescenta, a community 12 mi (19 km) north of downtown Los Angeles, where the body of a teenage girl was found naked, face up on a parkway in a middle-class residential area. The homeowner had covered her with a tarp in the early morning hours to prevent the neighborhood children from viewing her on their way to school. Ligature marks were on her neck, wrists, and ankles, indicating to police she was bound and strangled. The body had been dumped, indicating she was killed elsewhere.

Detective Salerno also found a small piece of light-colored fluff on her eyelid and saved it for the forensic experts. A coroner's report further detailed that she had been raped and sodomized. The girl, who was described as being "small and thin, weighing about 90 lb (41 kg) and appearing to be about 16 years old", was eventually identified as 15-year-old Judith Lynn Miller, a former student of Hollywood High School. After dropping out, Miller ran away from home in September 1977 and became a small-time sex worker.

Miller was last seen alive on Halloween 1977 talking to a man driving a large, two-toned sedan on Sunset Boulevard next to Carney's. The stranglers had told her they were "undercover" police officers, handcuffed her, and took her to Buono's Auto Upholstery Shop at 703 E. Colorado St. in Glendale, where she was raped and murdered.

=== Lissa Kastin ===
Five days later, on November 6, 1977, the nude body of another woman was discovered thrown down an embankment near the Chevy Chase Country Club in Glendale. Like Miller, her body bore five-point (neck, wrists, and ankles) ligature marks, and showed signs of having been strangled and raped, but not sodomized. The woman was identified as 21-year-old waitress Elissa Teresa "Lissa" Kastin, who was last seen leaving the restaurant where she worked the night before her body was discovered.

In addition to working full-time, Kastin was also a professional dancer in the all-female dance and cabaret troupe, The L.A. Knockers. Unlike the previous two victims, Kastin was not a sex worker, drug user, or runaway. The stranglers followed Kastin after she was seen driving home from work, pulled her over on the street she lived on, presented a fake "police badge", and told her that they were detectives. They then handcuffed her and told her they needed to take her in for questioning.

=== Aborted abduction of Catharine Lorre Baker ===
At some point in early November 1977, the two men approached 24-year-old Catharine Lorre Baker, the daughter of actor Peter Lorre—famous for his role as a serial killer in Fritz Lang's film M—with the intent of abducting and killing her. However, when Lorre produced not only her driver's license when requested, but also a picture of her sitting on her father's lap as a child, the two let her go without incident, fearing the murder of a celebrity's child would attract an unusually high amount of police and press attention.

Lorre did not realize who the men were until they were arrested, at which point she recalled that two men flashing police badges had approached her in the past.

=== Dolores Cepeda and Sonja Johnson ===
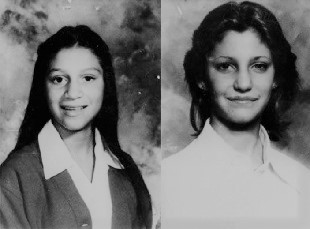
Dolores Cepeda (left) and Sonja Johnson

On Sunday, November 13, 1977, two girls, 12-year-old Dolores Ann "Dolly" Cepeda and 14-year-old Sonja Marie Johnson, boarded an RTD bus in front of the Eagle Rock Plaza on Colorado Boulevard and headed home. The last time they were seen was getting off the bus on York Boulevard and North Avenue 46, and approaching a two-tone sedan that reportedly had two men inside. They were forced into the car by the duo and were taken to Buono's home in Glendale, where they were killed. Their corpses were discovered by a 9-year-old boy who was treasure hunting in a trash heap on a hillside near Dodger Stadium on November 20, 1977. Both of the girls' bodies had already begun to decompose and it was determined that they had been strangled and raped.

=== Kristina Weckler ===
Earlier that same day, November 20, 1977, hikers found the naked body of 20-year-old Kristina Weckler, a quiet, unassuming honors student at the Art Center College of Design, described by Detective Bob Grogan of the Los Angeles Police Department as a "…loving and serious young woman who should have had a bright future ahead of her". Weckler was discovered on a hillside near the 4100 block of Ranons Way between Glendale and Eagle Rock. The last person to speak to Weckler was her father in San Francisco, who she had a telephone conversation with the previous evening.

When found by Detective Grogan, the typical ligature marks were on her wrists, ankles, and neck, and when he turned her over, bruises were observed on her breasts and blood oozed from her rectum. Unlike the first three victims, there were two puncture marks on her arm, but no signs of the needle tracks that indicated a drug addict. According to Bianchi, he and Buono tried to kill her by injecting air into her veins to cause an embolism. When this failed, they then injected with Windex, a common ammonia-based window, glass and hard-surface cleaner. This caused her to have convulsions, but again did not kill her. They then tied a plastic bag around her head with a rope and siphoned gas from the stove into it. She was determined to have been killed by strangulation.

=== Evelyn Jane King ===
At about 8:40 p.m. on November 23, 1977, the badly decomposed body of 28-year-old Evelyn Jane King was discovered in bushes near the Los Feliz Boulevard westbound off-ramp of the Golden State Freeway. King had gone missing on November 9. The severity of decomposition prevented determination as to whether she had been raped or tortured, but she had been strangled like the others.

Buono and Bianchi allegedly picked King up from a bus stop in the 5900 block of Franklin Avenue. King, an aspiring actress, had just finished an actor's workshop held at the nearby Church of Scientology center. According to Bianchi, the duo posed as police officers to gain her trust and offered her a ride. She was taken to Buono's upholstery shop where she was killed on either November 9 or 10th.

In response to her murder, authorities created a task force—initially composed of 30 officers from the LAPD, the Sheriff's Department and the Glendale Police Department—to catch the predator now dubbed the "Hillside Strangler".

=== Lauren Wagner ===
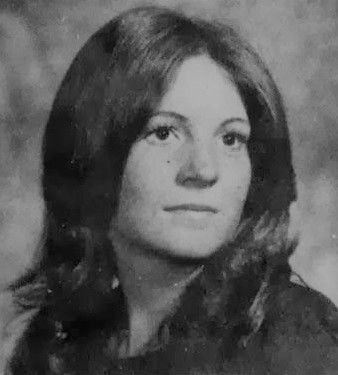
Lauren Rae Wagner

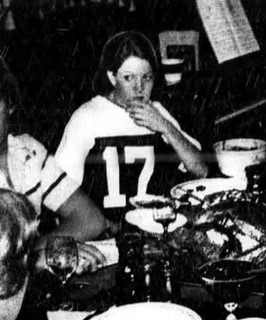
Lauren Wagner, pictured at a family Thanksgiving dinner on November 24, 1977

On November 29, 1977, police found the body of 18-year-old Lauren Rae Wagner at 1217 Cliff Drive in the Glassell Park neighborhood. She had ligature marks on her neck, ankles, and wrists, as well as burn marks on her hands indicating she was tortured.

Wagner was a business student at Sawyer Business College in Van Nuys. She lived with her parents on the 5900 block of Lemona Avenue in the San Fernando Valley. According to Bianchi, he and Buono approached Wagner posing as police officers and forced her out of her car. Lauren's parents had expected her to come home before midnight, and the next morning, when they found her car parked across the street with the door ajar, her father questioned the neighbors.

He found that the woman who lived in the house where Lauren's car had been parked saw her abduction. This woman stated that she saw two men: one was tall and young, the other one was older and shorter with bushy hair. She also stated that she heard Wagner cry out "You won't get away with this!" during her abduction. She was killed at Bruno's upholstery shop after she was sexually assaulted.

=== Kimberly Martin ===
On December 14, 1977, the naked body of 17-year-old sex worker Kimberly Diane Martin, which also showed signs of torture, was found on a deserted lot near Los Angeles City Hall. Martin had previously joined a call girl agency named Climax Outcall Service because she feared exposing herself on the streets with the Strangler on the loose.

The killers happened to place a call to her agency from a Hollywood Public Library pay phone requesting a blond girl, and she was the call girl who was dispatched. She was sent to an apartment located at 1950 Tamarind Avenue, in the same complex that Buono was also living in. Bianchi claimed that when Martin showed up, he and Buono placed her under arrest while posing as police officers. A struggle ensued, with Martin eventually being taken to Buono's apartment, where she was sexually assaulted and murdered.

When police investigated the apartment she had been dispatched to, they found it vacant and broken into. Bianchi's fingerprints were found on the pay phone used to call for her and in the apartment she was taken from.

=== Cindy Hudspeth ===
The body of the final Hillside Strangler victim, 20-year-old Cindy Lee Hudspeth, a student and part-time waitress, was discovered in Los Angeles on February 17, 1978, when a helicopter pilot spotted an orange Datsun abandoned midway down a cliff on the Angeles Crest Highway. Police responded to the scene and discovered her nude body in the trunk. Her corpse showed ligature marks and she had been raped, tortured, and strangled. Her body was placed in the trunk of her car, which was then pushed off the cliff.

Hudspeth's murder had initially been unplanned. Bianchi had arrived at Buono's upholstery shop at closing time on February 16 to discover Hudspeth in the company of Buono, discussing upholstery work she wished him to perform on her car. The two men had a private discussion, opting to make her their next victim. She was reported missing a day later by her roommate.

Hudspeth lived across the street from a previous victim, Kristina Weckler.

== Investigation and trial ==
In January 1979, after an intense investigation, police charged Bianchi and Buono with the crimes. Bianchi had fled to Bellingham, Washington, where he was soon arrested by Bellingham Police Department for raping and murdering two women he had lured to a home for a house-sitting job. Bianchi attempted to set up an insanity defense, claiming that he had dissociative identity disorder and that a personality separate from himself committed the murders. Court psychologists, notably Dr. Martin Orne, observed Bianchi and found that he was faking, so Bianchi agreed to plead guilty and testify against Buono in exchange for leniency.

At the conclusion of Buono's trial in 1983, Presiding Judge Ronald M. George, who later became Chief Justice of the California Supreme Court, stated during sentencing, "I would not have the slightest reluctance to impose the death penalty in this case were it within my power to do so. Ironically, although these two defendants utilized almost every form of legalized execution against their victims, the defendants have escaped any form of capital punishment."

Bianchi is serving a life sentence at the Washington State Penitentiary in Walla Walla. Buono died of a heart attack on September 21, 2002, at Calipatria State Prison in California, where he was serving a life sentence.

== Veronica Compton ==
In 1980, Bianchi began a relationship with 24 year old Veronica Compton of Carson, California after meeting at the Los Angeles County jail. During his trial, she testified for the defense. While incarcerated, Bianchi had smuggled a semen filled condom to her in the spine of a book, so she could use it to stage a rape/murder committed by the Hillside Strangler to have authorities believe that the Strangler was still on the loose.

On September 19, 1980, Compton attempted to strangle a 26-year-old female at the Shangri-La Downtown Motel in Bellingham, Washington. She was later convicted of first degree attempted murder by the Whatcom County Superior Court in March 1981 and was imprisoned. In 1982, she was accused of planning to give a false alibi for Doug Clark when he was on trial for the Sunset Strip Murders. In the evening of July 26, 1988, she and another prisoner named Candice L. Burke escaped from the Washington Corrections Center for Women near Gig Harbor, Washington. Their escape was facilitated by Robert Elbert France, Burke's father and a member of a white supremacist group named The Order. France posed as a prison guard and cut through 4 layers of fencing surrounding the prison. The trio were captured on August 4, 1988, at a motel in Tucson, Arizona. They were found with stolen items, drug paraphernalia, and forged documents. She pleaded guilty to first degree escape with a deadly weapon and was sentenced to an additional three years in prison.

Compton was released in 2003.

== Media ==
=== Film adaptations ===
Year	Title	Cast			Notes
Year	Title	as Angelo Buono	as Kenneth Bianchi	also starring	Notes
1989	The Case of the Hillside Stranglers	Dennis Farina	Billy Zane	Richard Crenna as Police Sergeant Bob Grogan	Made for television; based on Two of a Kind: The Hillside Stranglers by Darcy O'Brien
2001	The Hillside Stranglers	Ron Gilbert	Jeff Marchelletta		Made for television; also known as Supersleuth
2004	The Hillside Strangler	Nicholas Turturro	C. Thomas Howell	Marisol Padilla Sánchez as Christina Chavez (based on Veronica Compton)	
2006	Rampage: The Hillside Strangler Murders	Tomas Arana	Clifton Collins Jr.	Brittany Daniel as a psychiatrist	Direct-to-video

== See also ==
- Alphabet murders
- List of serial killers in the United States

== Cited works and further reading ==
- Hall, Allan (1994). The Power and the Evil. Leicester: Blitz Editions. pp. 11–14. ISBN 1-856-05208-7.
- Lane, Brian; Gregg, Wilfred (1995) [1992]. The Encyclopedia of Serial Killers. New York City: Berkley Book. pp. 50–52. ISBN 978-0-425-15213-3.
- O'Brien, Darcy (1985). Two of a Kind. Virginia: Nal Books. ISBN 978-0-453-00499-2.
- Wynn, Douglas (1995). On Trial for Murder. London: Pan Books. pp. 30–33. ISBN 0-330-33947-8.
- Foreman, Laura (2005). Compulsion to Kill. London: Time Life Value. ISBN 978-1-844471-08-9.
