= Rampage: The Hillside Strangler Murders =

- DVD cover
- Directed by: Chris Fisher
- Written by: Chris Fisher; Aaron Pope
- Produced by: Chris Fisher; Ash R. Shah
- Starring: Brittany Daniel; Lake Bell; Michelle Borth; Tomas Arana; Clifton Collins, Jr.
- Cinematography: Eliot Rockett
- Edited by: Annette Davey; Daniel R. Padgett
- Music by: Ryan Beveridge
- Production companies: Nightstalker LLC; Silver Nitrate Pictures
- Distributed by: Sony Pictures Home Entertainment
- Release date: January 10, 2006
- Running time: 85 minutes
- Country: United States
- Language: English
- Budget: $1,000,000 (estimated)

Rampage: The Hillside Strangler Murders is a 2006 American direct-to-video crime thriller about the Hillside Strangler murders. The film featured Brittany Daniel, Lake Bell and Michelle Borth, with Tomas Arana and Clifton Collins Jr. playing the killers Angelo Buono and Kenneth Bianchi, respectively. It was directed by Chris Fisher.

== Plot ==
Kenneth Bianchi, one of the two serial rapists and killers (along with his cousin Angelo Buono) who terrorized the Los Angeles area in the late 1970s, is giving police station interviews to psychiatrist Dr. Samantha Stone who has disquieting lifestyle issues of her own. It falls to her to delve into the details of the case to determine the veracity of Bianchi's claims of multiple personality disorder, but in so doing, she is forced to relive the horrific crimes, one of which occurs at her very doorstep.

== Cast ==
- Brittany Daniel as Dr. Samantha Stone, Psychiatrist
- Lake Bell as Jillian Dunne
- Michelle Borth as Nicole
- Tomas Arana as Angelo Buono
- Clifton Collins Jr. as Kenneth Bianchi
- Joleigh Fioravanti (credited as Joleigh Pulsonetti) as Tanya
- Bret Roberts as Jack
- Mike Hagerty as Detective Smith
- Mikal Kartvedt as Swat Officer
- Eddie Jemison as Kantor
- Stephen R. Hudis as Swat Captain

== Production ==
Started production in 2004 but was held back. The role of Jack was specifically written for Bret Roberts. Vincent Pastore was offered the part of Angelo Buono. When he had to decline, Tomas Arana got the part. Claire Forlani was also considered for the part of Samantha Stone.

Directed primarily with a hand-held camera by Chris Fisher. Filming took place in Valencia, California and was Shot in only 15 days.

== Reception ==
The film received negative reviews. On IMDb, it holds an average score of 4.2/10, with the critical consensus being that the script and acting were melodramatic and that it was not scary enough to be a thriller.

== See also ==
- The Hillside Strangler (film)
