= Alphabet murders =

Unsolved serial murders

The Alphabet murders
- Carmen Colón (left), Wanda Walkowicz (center) and Michelle Maenza (right)
- Other name: The Double Initial murders

Details
- Victims: 3
- Span of crimes: November 16, 1971 – November 26, 1973
- Country: United States
- State: New York
- Killed: 3
- Date apprehended: Unapprehended

The Alphabet murders (also known as the Double Initial murders) are an unsolved series of child murders which occurred between 1971 and 1973 in Rochester, New York.

All three victims were girls aged ten or eleven whose surname began with the same letter as that of her first name. Each victim had been sexually assaulted and murdered by either manual or ligature strangulation before her body was discarded in or near a town or village near Rochester with a name beginning with the same letter as the victim's name.

== Murders ==
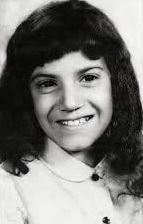
Carmen Colón

=== Carmen Colón ===
At 4:20 p.m. on November 16, 1971, a 10-year-old Puerto Rican child named Carmen Colón disappeared while returning home from an errand in Rochester, New York. According to eyewitnesses, Colón entered the pharmacy her grandmother had instructed her to visit on West Main Street, but left the store upon learning the prescription she had been instructed to collect had not been processed, informing the storeowner, Jack Corbin: "I got to go. I got to go." She was then observed entering a car parked close to the pharmacy. Colón was reported missing to the Rochester Police Department at 7:50 p.m.

Approximately fifty minutes after Colón exited the pharmacy, scores of motorists driving along Interstate 490 observed the child, naked from the waist down, running from a reversing vehicle believed to be a dark-colored Ford Pinto hatchback, frantically waving her arms and shouting in an attempt to flag down a passing vehicle. At least one of these witnesses observed Colón being submissively led back to this vehicle by her abductor. (Note: Although investigators would later determine Colón had been observed running from this vehicle, semi-naked and in an evident state of hysteria, by scores if not hundreds of vehicles in rush hour traffic, not one motorist had stopped to offer her any assistance to escape from her abductor.)

Two days later, two teenage boys discovered Colón's partially nude body in a gully not far from Interstate 490, and close to the village of Churchville. This location was approximately 12 miles from where Colón had last been seen alive. Her coat was discovered in a culvert some three hundred feet from her body; her trousers were later discovered on November 30, close to the service road near where numerous motorists had observed her attempting to escape her abductor.

An autopsy revealed that, in addition to having been raped, the child had suffered a fracture to her skull and one of her vertebrae before she had been manually strangled to death. Furthermore, her body had been extensively scratched by fingernails.

Both the murder of Colón and the fact no individual who had observed the child attempting to flee from her abductor alongside Interstate 490 had attempted to offer her any assistance generated intense public outrage. Two New York newspapers, the Times Union and the Democrat and Chronicle, initially offered a combined reward of $2,500 (equivalent to $19,875 in 2025) for information leading to the arrest and conviction of her murderer, and all information each publication received was relayed to police. Numerous local businesses and residents added private donations to the reward fund, gradually leading the sum to exceed $6,000 (equivalent to $47,699 in 2025). Although police interrogated several suspects in the months following Colón's murder, including her uncle, no individual was charged with her murder and by December 21, the number of investigators assigned to the case on a full-time basis was decreased to three.

One of the five billboards erected alongside Rochester expressways following the murder of Carmen Colón, appealing for public information relating to her murder

In early 1972, five large billboards—each measuring 30-feet-by-12-feet—were erected alongside major Rochester expressways. Each bore an 8 feet (2.4 m) high picture of the child alongside the headline: Do You Know Who Killed Carmen Colón? Free use of these billboards was given for one month by the Rochester Outdoor Advertising Company. Each offered a $6,000 reward for information leading to the arrest and conviction of Colón's murderer or murderers in addition to displaying the telephone hotline number and postal address—each established the previous November to encourage the public to submit anonymous information. Although this tactic generated several new leads, all failed to bear fruit. (Note: The murder of Carmen Colón proved to be the first homicide in Monroe County to remain unsolved in over five years.)

=== Wanda Walkowicz ===
Seventeen months later, at approximately 5:00 p.m. on April 2, 1973, 11-year-old Wanda Walkowicz disappeared from the east side of Rochester while returning home from an errand. According to the owner of the delicatessen Walkowicz had been instructed to visit, the child had purchased the groceries she had been instructed to buy at approximately 5:15 p.m. before she had begun walking alone down Conkey Avenue. Walkowicz was reported missing by her mother, Joyce, at 8:00 p.m.

Police immediately launched an intense search to locate Walkowicz. Almost fifty detectives searched several square miles of the terrain around her home, the delicatessen, and areas around the Genesee River where she had been known to play. These searches failed to locate the child, although several neighborhood residents recalled observing Walkowicz, struggling to carry the bag of groceries, walking just north of Avenue B. Three classmates specifically observed her bracing the bag against a fence so that she could improve her grip as a brown vehicle drove past her.

Walkowicz's fully clothed body was found by a police officer at 10:15 a.m. the following day, discarded at the base of a hillside alongside an access road to State Route 104 in Webster, approximately seven miles (11 km) from Rochester. The position of her body indicated she had likely been thrown from a moving vehicle, with her body rolling down the embankment.

An autopsy revealed she had been sexually assaulted, then strangled from behind with a ligature, most likely a belt. Several defensive wounds indicated Walkowicz had fought her murderer. (Note: About the defensive wounds discovered upon Walkowicz's body and her height of just four feet seven inches and weight of 77 pounds, the medical examiner who conducted her autopsy, Dr. John Edland, stated in his official report: "She was such a tiny [child]. I don't think she was capable of putting up much of a struggle.") In addition, her body had been redressed after death. The autopsy also revealed traces of semen and pubic hair on the child's body. Furthermore, several strands of white cat fur were found upon her clothing, although the Walkowicz family did not own a pet with fur of this color.

As had been the case with Carmen Colón, investigators established an anonymous telephone hotline in addition to distributing numerous flyers throughout Rochester appealing for information. A reward of $10,000 for information leading to the arrest and conviction of Walkowicz's murderer was also established.

These police inquiries produced an eyewitness who informed investigators that as Walkowicz had walked home from the delicatessen on the evening of April 2, he had observed the child standing alongside the passenger door of a large brown vehicle, conversing with the driver. This eyewitness was unable to obtain a clear view of the occupant of the vehicle, although the location of this sighting was just two-tenths of a mile from the Walkowicz home. Another individual who contacted investigators following the installation of the anonymous hotline informed investigators she had observed a man forcing a red-haired girl matching Walkowicz's description into a light-colored Dodge Dart on Conkey Avenue between 5:30 p.m. and 6:00 p.m. on the evening of her disappearance.

The Rochester Police Department dismissed any suggestion of a link between the murders of Colón and Walkowicz, although a sheriff's sergeant who had been assigned to investigate Colón's murder (by this stage still an open although largely inactive case) was reassigned to the task force implemented to investigate the murder of Walkowicz.

In September 1973, local television network WOKR announced plans to broadcast a televised reconstruction of Walkowicz's abduction and subsequent recovery of her body. This 30-minute episode was broadcast on 21 October, accompanied by public appeals for witnesses to contact authorities. Although this program resulted in the Rochester Police Department receiving over 200 calls from the public, no useful leads were gained.

=== Michelle Maenza ===
Seven months later, on the evening of November 26, 1973, 11-year-old Michelle Maenza was reported missing by her mother, Carolyn, after she failed to return home from school. Subsequent investigations would determine Maenza was last seen by her classmates at approximately 3:20 p.m. walking alone en route to a shopping plaza located close to her school with the intention of retrieving a purse her mother had left inside a store within the plaza earlier that day. Approximately ten minutes later, a witness observed Maenza sitting in the passenger seat of a beige or tan vehicle traveling at high speed on Ackerman Street before turning onto Webster Avenue. According to this witness, the child had been weeping.

At 5:30 p.m on November 26, a motorist observed a man standing by a large beige or tan vehicle with a flat tire, parked alongside Route 350 in the town of Walworth, holding a girl he strongly believed to be Michelle Maenza by the wrist. When this motorist had stopped to offer assistance, the individual had deliberately "grabbed the girl and pushed her behind his back", also obscuring his license plate from the motorist's view as he stared in his direction with such a menacing expression on his face that the motorist had felt compelled to drive away.

Maenza's fully clothed body was discovered at 10:30 a.m. on November 28, lying face down in a ditch alongside a rural road in Macedon, approximately 15 miles (24 km) from Rochester. Her autopsy revealed that in addition to receiving extensive blunt force trauma to her body, Maenza had been raped, then strangled to death from behind with a ligature, possibly a thin rope. Numerous strands of white cat fur were discovered upon her clothing, and leaf samples matching the foliage where her body was discovered were recovered from within one of her clenched hands, indicating she had likely been strangled to death at or near the location where she was found. (Note: One of the police officers to attend this crime scene, Anthony Fantigrossi, is known to have informed the media the Maenza crime scene had been "an exact duplicate" of the Walkowicz crime scene.) Investigators were able to retrieve a partial palm print from her neck and traces of semen on her body and underwear. A forensic analysis of the semen samples determined she had been raped by one individual.

Composite drawing of the individual seen with Michelle Maenza prior to her murder

An analysis of the contents of Maenza's stomach revealed traces of a hamburger and onions which had been consumed approximately one hour before her murder, giving credence to earlier reports of a girl matching Maenza's description having been seen in the company of a Caucasian man with dark hair, aged between 25 and 35, approximately 6 ft 0 in (1.83 m) tall and weighing 165 lb (75 kg) both at a fast food restaurant in the town of Penfield at approximately 4:30 p.m. on the afternoon of her disappearance, and alongside Route 350 approximately one hour later.

== Funerals ==
Carmen Colón, Wanda Walkowicz, and Michelle Maenza were each laid to rest in Rochester's Holy Sepulchre Cemetery.

Colón's funeral was conducted on November 22, 1971. Her funeral Mass was attended by 200 mourners. Walkowicz was laid to rest on April 6, 1973. She was laid to rest in a small white and gold casket following a service officiated by the Reverend Benedict Ehmann. Maenza's funeral was held at the Corpus Christi Church on December 1, 1973. Her open-casket funeral service was attended by scores of mourners. At the conclusion of Michelle's funeral service, her father, Christopher Maenza, stated to other mourners: "She was a sweet little girl. She didn't fight much."

== Investigation ==
All three child murders generated intense public outrage; each received intense publicity. Following the murder of Michelle Maenza, investigators released a composite drawing of the individual seen with the child by numerous witnesses to the media. They also installed a telephone hotline exclusively devoted to the manhunt for the perpetrator, whom they strongly suspected had committed all three murders. Anonymity was again offered to any caller offering information, and a reward was again offered for any information leading to the arrest and conviction of the perpetrator. Although these efforts resulted in numerous calls from the public, no credible suspect was located.

Although investigators interrogated more than 800 potential suspects in relation to the Alphabet murders, the perpetrator or perpetrators of the homicides was never caught, and the case remains unsolved. As each child hailed from a poor Catholic family, had few friends, and had recently experienced issues such as bullying or poor academic performance at her school, investigators have not discounted the possibility the murderer may have been employed by, or held knowledge of the practises of, a social service agency in his efforts to initiate contact with and/or gain the trust of each victim.

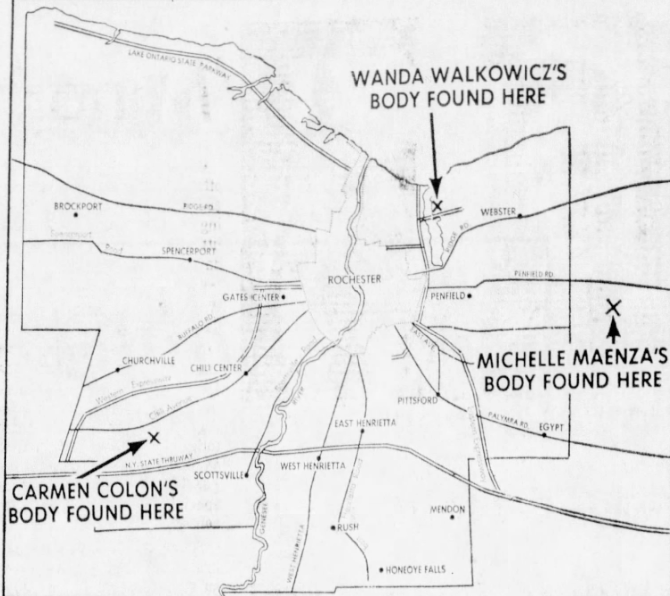
Contemporary newspaper illustration depicting the body recovery locations of Colón, Walkowicz, and Maenza

=== Similarities ===
All three victims were preadolescent females who had disappeared from Rochester in the early afternoon on days of light or heavy rain and whose bodies were later discovered within nearby towns. The body of each girl had been discovered either fully clothed or partially clothed close to an expressway at a location typically accessible by vehicle and each victim had evidently been thrown from or carried from a car to the location her body had been discarded.

Each child was short in height, and all three girls had been raped before being strangled to death. In addition, all three were known to be viewed as somewhat lonely outcasts among their peers. Furthermore, an analysis of the stomach contents of both Walkowicz and Maenza revealed both girls had ingested food shortly before their death which neither girl is known to have eaten prior to her disappearance, and the bodies of both girls had been redressed after death.

Both contemporary and current investigators have stated the possibility each victim had been selected due to the double initials of her name is extremely unlikely, as for an offender to preselect his victims for this incidental reason would likely involve his stalking his victim over an extensive period of time, thus increasing the risk of his being noticed. Furthermore, some investigators believe that, although the murders of Walkowicz and Maenza may have been committed by the same individual who had lured the girls to their deaths, the overall modus operandi of the murder of Carmen Colón strongly indicates her murder had been committed by an individual known—and possibly related—to her as opposed to an individual unknown to her, who had abducted her by force. (Note: In the months prior to Carmen Colón's abduction and murder, her grandparents had noted her sleeping pattern had become frequently disturbed by recurring nightmares. These nightmares Colón experienced were often so violent the child would fall from her bed. Recurring nightmares is a classic symptom of the distress felt by victims of child sexual abuse.)

== Suspects ==
=== Miguel Colón ===
In the case of Carmen Colón, her uncle, Miguel Colón, is considered by investigators to be a strong suspect in her murder. Miguel was her paternal uncle. Following the separation of Colón's parents, he had formed a relationship with her mother, Guillermina.

Typically, on occasions Colón walked to the pharmacy to collect family prescriptions, she had been accompanied by her grandfather, Felix, although on the date of her disappearance, Colón had pleaded with her grandparents to be allowed to walk to the pharmacy unaccompanied.

Just weeks prior to Colón's abduction and murder, her uncle is known to have purchased a car closely matching the vehicle seen by eyewitnesses reversing upon Interstate 490 in pursuit of the child. (Note: The Rochester Police Department received six differing descriptions of the model of vehicle reversing in pursuit of Carmen Colón—although all of the eyewitnesses described the car as a luxury model. However, one of these eyewitnesses also observed the child being led back to the vehicle by the arm, suggesting she had likely known her abductor.) Investigators did conduct a search of this vehicle shortly after Colón's murder, discovering the interior and exterior of the car had been extensively cleaned, and the trunk had been washed with a strong cleaning solution. Questioning of the dealership which had recently sold the vehicle to Miguel revealed the trunk had not been washed with a detergent prior to sale. Moreover, a doll belonging to the child was found in his car, although Colón's relatives informed investigators she had frequently traveled in Miguel's vehicle and may have left the toy in his car. Furthermore, according to a friend, two days after the death of his niece, Miguel had informed him of his intention to leave the country as he had "done something wrong in Rochester." He relocated from Rochester to Puerto Rico just four days after the murder of his niece.

Investigators did travel to San Juan to question Miguel in March 1972, although local newspapers published articles detailing police intentions to question him, resulting in Miguel fleeing from authorities. Miguel surrendered to authorities on March 26, and agreed to be extradited back to Rochester to face questioning.

Miguel Colón was unable to provide a credible alibi for his movements on the date of his niece's murder, and no individual could be located to corroborate his claims regarding his whereabouts. Despite strong circumstantial evidence attesting to Miguel's guilt, no physical evidence was located at the crime scene or within his vehicle to link him to the murder.

Miguel Colón died by suicide in 1991 at the age of 44 following an incident of domestic violence in which he shot and wounded both his wife and his brother.

=== Dennis Termini ===
One individual considered a strong suspect in the Alphabet murders is a 25-year-old Rochester firefighter named Dennis Termini. Termini was a prolific serial offender known as the "Garage Rapist" who is known to have committed a minimum of fourteen rapes of teenage girls and young women between 1971 and 1973. He is also known to have owned a beige vehicle similar in description to the vehicle observed by several eyewitnesses to the abductions. Moreover, he lived at an address on Bock Street—an address close to the area where Michelle Maenza was last seen alive.

Five weeks after the death of the final victim of the Alphabet murders, on January 1, 1974, Termini attempted to abduct a teenage girl at gunpoint, although he fled the scene when the teenager refused to stop screaming. Shortly thereafter, he abducted another potential victim, although on this occasion he was pursued by the police, culminating in Termini committing suicide by shooting himself in the head. A subsequent forensic examination of Termini's vehicle did reveal traces of white cat fur on the upholstery.

In January 2007, Termini's body was exhumed to obtain a DNA sample for comparison with the semen samples recovered from Walkowicz's body. The results of this test confirmed Termini was not responsible for her murder. However, no physical evidence retrieved from the bodies of Colón or Maenza exists for comparison with Termini's DNA. (Note: The sole remaining physical evidence pertaining to any of the Alphabet murders are the semen samples recovered from the body of Wanda Walkowicz. All physical evidence recovered from the bodies of Colón and Maenza and their respective crime scenes has been lost or destroyed.)

=== Kenneth Bianchi ===
Another suspect in the Alphabet murders is serial killer Kenneth Bianchi, who at the time of the murders worked as an ice cream vendor in Rochester. He is known to have worked at locations close to the first two murder scenes. Bianchi had relocated from Rochester to Los Angeles in January 1976. Between 1977 and 1978, he and his cousin, Angelo Buono, Jr., committed the Hillside Strangler murders of 10 girls and young women between the ages of 12 and 28.

Bianchi was never charged with the Alphabet murders, and has vehemently denied any culpability in the homicides. He has repeatedly attempted to have investigators officially clear him of suspicion. However, while residing in Rochester, he is known to have driven a vehicle of the same color and model as a vehicle seen near one of the abduction sites.

=== Joseph Naso ===
In April 2011, a 77-year-old named Joseph Naso was arrested in Reno, Nevada for the murders of four women in California committed between 1977 and 1994, all of whom are believed to have been prostitutes and each of whose surname began with the same letter as that of her first name. (Note: One of Naso's victims had also been named Carmen Colón.) Naso was a New York native who had lived in Rochester during the early 1970s and who is known to have regularly traveled between New York and California.

Initially described by authorities as a person of interest in the Alphabet murders, DNA testing has confirmed Naso's DNA is not a match to the semen samples recovered from the body of Wanda Walkowicz.

Naso was brought to trial on June 18, 2013, charged with the murder of the four California Alphabet Murder victims. He was unanimously convicted of each murder on August 20. On November 22, 2013, Naso was formally sentenced to death.

== Aftermath ==
In 1995, the mother of Carmen Colón made her first public statement regarding the murder of her daughter. In this interview, granted to Democrat and Chronicle reporter Jack Jones, Guillermina Colón stated that although she had lived her entire life in poverty, if she could have only one thing before her own death, it would not be wealth, but knowing who had murdered her daughter, adding: "[If] I could die knowing who killed my Carmencita, I could die more peacefully than I have lived. It is the only thing I want in my life, to know that this person had to pay for the terrible things he did to my little girl. If the person who did this could have any compassion, he would see the pain and suffering the families of these little girls have gone through, for all this time."

The Democrat and Chronicle newspaper published a series of articles focusing upon the ongoing police investigation into the Alphabet murders in 2009, appealing for public information with view to closing the case. These articles resulted in the Rochester Police Department receiving approximately twenty new leads of inquiry. Although all leads received were pursued, none resulted in the apprehension and conviction of the perpetrator(s). Nonetheless, a police spokesman has stated the Rochester Police Department remains committed to solving the case.

== Media ==
=== Film ===
- A feature film, The Alphabet Killer, is inspired by the Alphabet murders. Written by Tom Malloy and directed by Rob Schmidt, the movie was released in November 2008 and stars Eliza Dushku.

=== Literature ===
- Farnsworth, Cheri L. (2010). Alphabet Killer: The True Story of the Double Initial Murders. Stackpole Books. ISBN 978-0-811-70632-2.
- Thompson, Emily G. (2018). Unsolved Child Murders: Eighteen American Cases, 1956–1998. North Carolina: McFarland & Company Inc. pp. 34–43. ISBN 978-1-476-67000-3.
- Tubman, Donald A. (2018). Nightmare in Rochester: The Double-Initial Murders. United States: Amazon Kindle Direct Publishing. ISBN 978-1-790-16809-5.

=== Television ===
- The Discovery Channel has broadcast a 45-minute episode focusing upon the Alphabet murders. First broadcast in 2001, this episode features interviews with former FBI profiler Roy Hazelwood, who developed an offender profile for investigators for usage in the case which indicates the likelihood of two separate offenders.

== See also ==
- Child abduction
- Child sexual abuse
- Cold case
- List of fugitives from justice who disappeared
- List of kidnappings
- List of murdered American children
- List of serial killers in the United States
- List of unsolved deaths

== Cited works and further reading ==
- Benson, Michael (2010). Murder Times Two: Killer Twins. New York: Pinnacle Books. ISBN 978-0-78603185-6.
- Benson, Michael (2015). The Devil at Genesee Junction: The Murders of Kathy Bernhard and George-Ann Formicola. Lambeth: Rowman & Littlefield. pp. 63–68. ISBN 978-1-442-25233-2.
- Cawthorne, Nigel (2007). The Mammoth Book of Killers at Large. London: Robinson Publishing. ISBN 978-1-845-29631-5.
- Farnsworth, Cheri L. (2010). Alphabet Killer: The True Story of the Double Initial Murders. Stackpole Books. ISBN 978-0-811-70632-2.
- Hickey, Eric W. (2009). Serial Murderers and Their Victims. California: Wadsworth Publishing Co. ISBN 978-0-495-60081-7.
- Hunt, Amber; Thompson, Emily G. (2019). Unsolved Murders: True Crime Cases Uncovered. London: DK Publishing. ISBN 978-0-241-36132-0.
- Lane, Brian; Gregg, Wilfred (1995) [1992]. The Encyclopedia Of Serial Killers. New York City: Berkley Books. ISBN 0-425-15213-8.
- Newton, Michael (1999). Still at Large: A Casebook of 20th Century Serial Killers who Eluded Justice. Washington: Loompanics Unlimited. ISBN 978-1-559-50184-2.
- Newton, Michael (2009). The Encyclopedia of Unsolved Crimes. New York: Facts on File. ISBN 978-0-816-07818-9.
- Ramsland, Katherine; McGrain, Patrick N. (2009). Inside the Minds of Sexual Predators. Connecticut: Praeger Publishers. ISBN 978-0-313-37960-4.
- Schechter, Harold (1996). The A to Z Encyclopedia of Serial Killers. New York: Pocket Books. ISBN 978-1-476-67000-3.
- Schwarz, Ted (2004). The Hillside Strangler: The Three Faces of America's Most Savage Rapist and Murderer and the Shocking Revelations from the Sensational Los Angeles Trial. California: Quill Driver Books. pp. 253–261. ISBN 978-1-884-95637-9.
- Thompson, Emily G. (2018). Unsolved Child Murders: Eighteen American Cases, 1956–1998. North Carolina: McFarland & Company Inc. ISBN 978-1-476-67000-3.
- Tubman, Donald A. (2018). Nightmare in Rochester: The Double-Initial Murders. United States: Amazon Kindle Direct Publishing. ISBN 978-1-790-16809-5.
