= Kenneth Bianchi =

American serial killer (born 1951)

Kenneth Alessio Bianchi
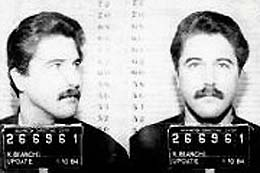
- Bianchi in 1979
- Born: Kenneth Alessio Bianchi; May 22, 1951 (age 75); Rochester, New York, U.S.
- Other name: The Hillside Strangler, Kennifer
- Motive: Sexual sadism
- Convictions: California; First degree murder (5 counts); Sodomy; Conspiracy to commit a felony Washington; First degree murder, Jaywalking (2 counts)
- Penalty: Two consecutive life sentences with the possibility of parole

Details
- Victims: 12+
- Span of crimes: October 16, 1977 – January 11, 1979
- Country: United States
- States: California; Washington
- Date apprehended: January 12, 1979
- Imprisoned at: Washington State Penitentiary

Kenneth Alessio Bianchi (/ˈbiːænkiː/; born May 22, 1951) is an American serial killer, kidnapper, and rapist. He is known for the Hillside Strangler murders which he committed with his cousin Angelo Buono Jr. in Los Angeles, as well as for two more murders in Washington State as the sole perpetrator. Bianchi is currently serving a sentence of life imprisonment in Washington State Penitentiary for these crimes. He was also at one time a suspect in the Alphabet murders, three unsolved murders in his home city of Rochester, New York, from 1971 to 1973. Bianchi was most recently denied parole in 2025.

== Early life ==
Kenneth Bianchi was born on May 22, 1951, in Rochester, New York, to a 17-year-old prostitute who gave him up for adoption two weeks after he was born. He was adopted in August 1951 by Italian-American couple Nicholas Bianchi and his wife, Frances Scioliono-Bianchi, and was their only child. Bianchi was deeply troubled from a young age, with his adoptive mother describing him as "a compulsive liar" from the time he could talk. He would often fall into inattentive, trance-like daydreams where his eyes would roll back into his head. From these symptoms, a physician diagnosed the five-year-old Bianchi with petit mal seizures. He was also frequently given physical examinations by doctors due to a problem with involuntary urination, causing him a great deal of humiliation.

Bianchi was prone to fits of anger as well as bouts of insomnia and habitual bedwetting when he was young. On January 2, 1957, he accidentally fell off a jungle gym and landed on his face. Bianchi's adoptive mother, in an attempt to change his behavior, sent him to a private Catholic elementary school and to sessions with a psychiatrist, with Bianchi being diagnosed with a passive-aggressive personality disorder at the age of ten. Bianchi's intelligence quotient was measured at 116 at the age of eleven, but despite having above-average intelligence, he was an underachiever and was removed twice from schools after failing to get along with teachers. Bianchi's adoptive mother described him as "lazy," and his teachers claimed that he was working below his potential.

In July 1963, Bianchi pulled down a six-year-old girl's underwear after deciding that he liked doing it. After his adoptive father died suddenly from pneumonia in 1964, the teenaged Bianchi refused to cry or show any other signs of grief. After her husband's death, Bianchi's adoptive mother had to work while he attended a public high school and was known for keeping Bianchi home from school for long periods of time. Nonetheless, Bianchi dated frequently and even joined a motorcycle club. Shortly after he graduated from Gates-Chili High School in 1970, Bianchi married his high school sweetheart, Brenda Beck. The union ended after eight months. Supposedly, she left him without an explanation.

As an adult, Bianchi decided that he wanted to become a police officer, and he enrolled at Monroe Community College to study police science and psychology. He dropped out of college after just one semester, however, and drifted through a series of menial jobs, finally finding employment as a security guard at a jewelry store. This gave Bianchi the opportunity to steal valuables, which he often gave to girlfriends or prostitutes to buy their loyalty. He applied for a position at the local sheriff's department but was rejected.

Because of his many petty thefts, Bianchi was constantly on the move. In 1976 he moved to Los Angeles, and started spending time with his older cousin and Frances' nephew, Angelo Buono Jr., who impressed Bianchi with his fancy clothes, jewelry and talent for getting any woman he wanted and "putting them in their place." Before long, they worked together as pimps and, by late 1977, had escalated to committing what would become known as the "Hillside Strangler" murders. Bianchi and Buono had raped and murdered ten young women and girls by the time they were arrested in early 1979.

== Murders ==
Bianchi and Buono frequently impersonated police officers, flashing phony police badges and ordering the unassuming victims to get into Bianchi's Cadillac, telling them that it was an unmarked police car. They'd then handcuff them and drive them to Buono's upholstery shop, where they would proceed to sexually abuse their victims before strangling them. They experimented with other methods of killing, such as lethal injection, electric shock and carbon monoxide poisoning. Even while committing the murders, Bianchi applied for a job with the Los Angeles Police Department (LAPD) and had even been taken for several ride-alongs with police officers while they were searching for the Hillside Strangler. The crimes and murders that the duo committed are as follows:

Victims
Name	Age	Date Killed	Details
Yolanda Washington	19	Oct 17, 1977	Washington was a sex worker whose nude body was found on October 17, 1977, on a hillside near the Ventura Freeway at 6510 Forest Lawn Drive in Los Angeles, positioned in a lewd manner. Her body had been cleaned before being dumped and faint rope marks were visible around her neck, wrists and ankles. She had been beaten, raped and strangled to death, and was the first confirmed mutual victim of Bianchi and Buono. The two men picked up Washington and killed her in their vehicle as they pretended to be police officers in civilian attire.
Judith Lynn Miller	15	Oct 31, 1977	Miller was a student at Hollywood High School who also was a child victim of underaged prostitution. In the 8300 Block of Sunset Boulevard, Miller was looking for clients when Bianchi and Buono approached her on October 31, 1977. She was murdered in Angelo's upholstery shop at 703 East Colorado Street in Glendale, and her body was dumped next to 2844 Alta Terrace in La Crescenta, a flood control channel. Her nude body was discovered that evening, lying face up in a parkway in the hills above Glendale. Her legs were posed in the shape of a diamond, and she had been raped, sodomised and strangled. Her neck, wrists and ankles all displayed evidence of ligature marks.
Elissa Teresa Kastin	21	Nov 5, 1977	Kastin was a dancer and waitress working in North Hollywood. Her body was found on November 6, 1977, next to a country club in the Chevy Chase Canyon neighborhood in Glendale. She had been beaten, raped but not sodomised, and strangled when she was discovered nude with rope marks on her wrists and ankles. Kastin's co-workers had noticed that she had been conversing with two clients who acted strangely the evening before she had vanished.
Evelyn Jane King	28	Nov 9, 1977	King, an aspiring actress and Scientologist, was found dead in some bushes near the Los Feliz exit on the Golden State Freeway on November 23, 1977. She had vanished on November 9 while awaiting a bus. It was impossible to tell if King had been raped or tortured due to the severity of her decomposition, but it was strongly suspected that she had been sodomised in addition to being strangled.
Dolores Ann “Dolly” Cepeda	12	Nov 13, 1977	Dolly Cepeda and Sonja Johnson were schoolgirls and close friends who were abducted after getting off a bus at Eagle Rock Plaza on November 13, 1977. Presenting fake police identification, Bianchi and Buono kidnapped the girls, who were killed at Buono's upholstery shop in Glendale. On November 20, their bodies were discovered in a garbage pile in Highland Park. Although their bodies were already starting to decompose, it was determined that both had been raped and killed via strangulation.
Sonja Johnson	14	Nov 13, 1977	Sonja Johnson and Dolly Cepeda were found on November 20, 1977, in a trash heap in Highland Park. Their bodies were already decomposing, but it could be determined that both had been raped and killed via strangulation.
Kristina Weckler	20	Nov 20, 1977	Weckler was an honors student at ArtCenter College of Design whose body was found by hikers on a hillside in a residential area of Los Angeles on November 20, 1977. She had ligature marks on her neck, wrists and ankles but no defensive wounds. Weckler's breasts were bruised, she had two puncture scars on her arm and her rectum was bleeding. It was later determined that she had been tortured by having Windex cleaning fluid injected into her body. She was fatally asphyxiated with gas from an oven. Weckler's nude body was discovered not far from her Glendale residence.
Lauren Rae Wagner	18	Nov 28, 1977	Wagner, a business school student, was found dead on the west side of Mount Washington at 1217 Cliff Drive Glassell Park on November 29, 1977. She appeared to have been burned by an electrical cord while being tortured based on burn marks found on the inside of her hands. Additionally, there was evidence that suggested Wagner was handcuffed before being strangled. At this time, investigators came to the conclusion that the perpetrator might have been a police officer or posing as one. They consequently issued a caution to female drivers who were stopped by policemen to double-check that they were in fact law enforcement.
Kimberly “Kim” Diane Martin	17	Dec 13, 1977	Martin, a sex worker and model, was found on a deserted lot near Los Angeles City Hall on December 14, 1977. Her body had been dumped over the side of a hill in the Silver Lake neighborhood, and could be seen from Parker Center, the LAPD's then-headquarters. Martin was working for an outcall escort service when she was called to 1950 Tamarind, Hollywood, on the night of her murder. She was raped and tortured before being strangled.
Cindy Lee Hudspeth	20	Feb 16, 1978	Hudspeth was a waitress who was sexually assaulted, strangled and then dumped in the trunk of her Datsun before being pushed off a cliff on Angeles Crest Highway on February 16, 1978. The following day, she was discovered. Hudspeth had been tortured; ligature marks were apparent on her neck, ankles and wrists.
Karen Lauretta Mandic	22	Jan 11, 1979	Mandic and Wilder were lured by Bianchi into a house he was guarding. Both women were strangled to death. These last two murders were committed by Bianchi alone, without help from Buono.
Diane Amy Wilder	27	Jan 11, 1979	Working as a security guard, Bianchi lured Mandic and Wilder, both students at Western Washington University, into a house he was guarding in Bellingham, Washington. Bianchi forced Mandic down the stairs in front of him and then strangled her. He murdered Wilder in a similar fashion. Without Buono's guidance, Bianchi left many clues and police apprehended him the next day. A California driver's license and a routine background check linked Bianchi to the addresses of two Strangler victims. These last two murders were committed by Bianchi alone, without help from Buono.

- Following his arrest, Bianchi admitted that he and Buono, while posing as police officers, stopped a young woman called Catharine Lorre with the intention of abducting and killing her in 1977, but released her after learning she was the daughter of actor Peter Lorre. Only after the men were arrested did Catharine learn of their identities.
- Between 1971 and 1973, three young girls in Rochester were abducted, sexually assaulted, and murdered in what were later dubbed the "Alphabet murders." Bianchi was never formally charged in these crimes, but he was considered a suspect because he had worked as an ice cream vendor near two of the murder scenes and drove a car similar to a suspicious vehicle spotted near one of the abduction sites. Bianchi has denied any responsibility for these murders.
- On September 4, 1977, the body of 26-year-old Laura Collins was discovered in Griffith Park, having been strangled. She was initially included by the Los Angeles media as a potential victim of the Strangler, but a 1979 complaint against Bianchi and Buono did not ultimately list her as one of their victims. Bianchi and Buono were never found guilty of her murder or confessed to it. Collins' death is still unsolved.
- On November 10, 1977, 18-year-old Jill Terry Barcomb, a native of Oneida, New York, was sexually assaulted, beaten and strangled before being dumped in a ravine off the Mulholland Highway and was originally thought to have been a victim of the Strangler. However, her case was ultimately decided by authorities to have been unrelated after the arrests of Bianchi and Buono. Neither confessed or were ever convicted of the murder. In March 2010, serial killer Rodney Alcala was convicted of Barcomb's murder as well as with four others.
- On November 17, 1977, 17-year-old Kathleen Kimberly Robinson, was found dead in a parkway in the Wilshire district of Los Angeles. She was initially believed to be a victim of the Strangler, but as soon as it was discovered that the circumstances of her case were different from the others, a connection was quickly ruled out. Robinson's murder is still unsolved.

== Trial ==
At his trial, Bianchi pleaded not guilty by reason of insanity, claiming that another personality, one "Steve Walker," had committed the crimes. It was believed he had recently seen the film Sybil (1976), about a woman suffering from multiple personalities triggered by childhood abuse. Bianchi convinced a few expert psychiatrists that he indeed suffered from multiple personality disorder, but investigators brought in their own psychiatrists, mainly Martin Orne. When Orne mentioned to Bianchi that in genuine cases of the disorder, there tend to be three or more personalities, Bianchi promptly created another alias, "Billy."

To prove that Bianchi had lied about having multiple personalities to avoid being prosecuted, Orne tested him by introducing him to his lawyer, who was not present. Bianchi interacted with the imaginary lawyer. Orne then brought in his real lawyer, flustering Bianchi, who claimed that the imaginary lawyer had vanished. Prior to his actual lawyer's appearance, Bianchi even leaned over to shake the hand of the imaginary one; an action which is referred to as "tactile hallucinations" that experts explained is an event that rarely, if ever, happens during hypnosis nor other types of neurological-event triggered hallucination. Orne had never seen a true "tactile hallucination" in his career, suggesting that this was a complete fabrication. Bianchi eventually pleaded guilty in order to avoid the death penalty in Washington State.

Investigators eventually discovered that the name "Steven Walker" came from a student whose identity Bianchi had previously attempted to steal for the purpose of fraudulently practicing psychology. Police also found a small library of books in Bianchi's home on topics of modern psychology, further suggestion of his ability to fake multiple personality disorder. Once his claims were subjected to scrutiny, Bianchi eventually admitted that he had been faking the disorder. He was eventually diagnosed with antisocial personality disorder with sexual sadism disorder.

In an attempt to obtain a reduced sentence, Bianchi agreed to testify against Buono. However, in giving his testimony, he made every effort to be as uncooperative and self-contradictory as possible, apparently hoping to avert Buono's conviction. In the end, Bianchi's efforts were unsuccessful, as Buono was convicted and sentenced to life imprisonment. Bianchi himself was also ultimately sentenced to two terms of life imprisonment with the possibility of parole.

In 1980, Bianchi began a relationship with Veronica Compton, a woman he had met while in prison. During his trial, she testified for the defense, telling the jury a false, vague tale about the crimes in an attempt to exculpate Bianchi. She also admitted to wanting to buy a mortuary with another convicted murderer for the purpose of necrophilia. Compton was later convicted and imprisoned for attempting to strangle a woman she had lured to a motel in an attempt to convince authorities that the Hillside Strangler was still on the loose. Bianchi had allegedly given her some semen during a prison visit to plant on the planned victim to make it look like a rape/murder committed by the Strangler.

In 1992, Bianchi sued Catherine Yronwode for $8.5 million for having an image of his face depicted on a trading card; he claimed his face was trademarked. The judge dismissed the case after ruling that, if Bianchi had been using his face as a trademark when he was killing women, he would not have tried to hide it from the police.

== Detention ==
Bianchi is currently serving his sentence at Washington State Penitentiary in Walla Walla, Washington.

In March 1989, he joined the Seventh-day Adventist Church.

On September 21, 1989, at age 38, he married 36-year-old Shirlee Joyce Book, from Montgomery, Alabama. They had begun communicating in 1986 by mail and phone. The wedding ceremony took place in the penitentiary chapel. Nine people attended, including Bianchi's father and stepmother. Bianchi was denied conjugal visits with his wife.

In June 1989, Bianchi was granted an appeal with the United States Court of Appeals for the Ninth Circuit. He claimed that the Bellingham Police Department did not have probable cause to arrest him, and that he was held for more than 72 hours without charges being filed against him.

In 1994, Bianchi again appealed, citing that he had ineffective council and had been coerced into pleading guilty under hypnosis. His appeal was denied.

He was denied parole on August 18, 2010, by a state board in Sacramento.

During his detention, Bianchi changed his name to Anthony D'Amato.

Bianchi was most recently denied parole in July 2025.

== Media ==
In the 1989 film The Case of the Hillside Stranglers, Bianchi was portrayed by actor Billy Zane. In the 2004 film The Hillside Strangler, Bianchi was portrayed by actor C. Thomas Howell, and in Rampage: The Hillside Strangler Murders (2006), he was played by Clifton Collins Jr. On January 18, 2026, a documentary about the case came out on MGM+. In it, Bianchi appears in a new on-camera interviews in which he proclaims his innocence.

== See also ==
- List of serial killers in the United States
- List of serial killers by number of victims
