= Calipatria State Prison =

Male-only state prison in California, US

Calipatria State Prison (CAL)
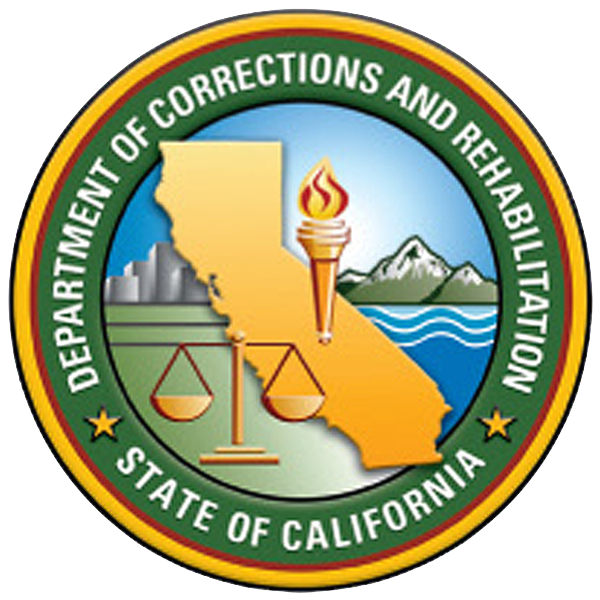
- Aerial View
- Interactive map of Calipatria State Prison (CAL)
- Location: Calipatria, California; 33.166°N 115.486°W
- Status: Operational
- Security class: Minimum-maximum
- Capacity: 2,308
- Population: 2,500 (108.3% capacity) (January 31, 2023)
- Opened: 1992
- Managed by: California Department of Corrections and Rehabilitation
- Warden: Warren Montgomery

Calipatria State Prison (CAL) is a male-only state prison located in the city of Calipatria, in Imperial County, California.

== Facilities ==
Although located about 3 miles (4.8 km) from the center of Calipatria, the prison is within the city limits. Called the lowest prison in the Western Hemisphere, it lies 184 feet (56 m) below sea level. As of Fiscal Year 2005/2006, CAL had a total of 1,143 staff and an annual operating budget of $123 million.

The facility covers a total of 1,227.5 acres (496.8 ha) (with the prison on 300 acres (120 ha)). In September 2007, it had a design capacity of 2,308 but a total institution population of 4,180, for an occupancy rate of 181.1 percent.

As of July 31, 2022, CAL was incarcerating people at 110.1% of its design capacity, with 2,543 occupants.

Over 2,000 of its housing units are maximum-security Level IV ("Cells, fenced or walled perimeters, electronic security, more staff and unarmed officers both inside and outside the installation"); the remainder are minimum-security Level I ("Open dormitories without a secure perimeter").

== History ==
Location of Calipatria within Imperial County, and location of Imperial County within California

CAL opened in January 1992, approximately 22 months before California State Prison, Centinela (the other state prison in Imperial County). A $1.5 million electrified fence, which could cause instantaneous death for escaping inmates and which was the first of its kind among California state prisons, was installed in November 1993. After a number of birds had died by electrocution, an ornithologist was hired to help redesign the fence and eliminate the problem.

As of 1995, CAL's problems included "double-celling" (placing two inmates in bunk beds in a cell designed for one), psychological stress, a drastic shortage of work for prisoners, chronic understaffing among prison employees, and gang violence. A May 1995 incident in which five inmates stabbed and assaulted eight officers was described in 1997 as the worst inmate attack on staff in California state prisons in recent years.

The weather in the area is desert-like, cold in winter and very hot in summer—up to 118 degrees Fahrenheit. The smell of cow manure pervades the prison and the entire area due to large cattle feed lots nearby.

Angelo Buono, Jr. (also known as the Hillside Strangler) died at CAL in September 2002 of a "massive heart attack."

An August 2005 riot at CAL was the most violent uprising at the prison. The event left 25 inmates and 25 prison staff members wounded. A guard shot and killed an inmate with a Ruger Mini-14 semiautomatic rifle, which was believed to have contributed to ending the violence. A spokesman for the California Department of Corrections and Rehabilitation stated that the disturbance involved Hispanic gang members.

== Notable inmates (current & former) ==
- Patrick Kearney, serial killer known as the Trashbag Killer. Spent time in CAL in the early 2000s.
- James Fagone, accomplice of murderer Larissa Schuster
- Angelo Buono Jr., serial killer and one of the two "Hillside Stranglers"; died in CAL in 2002
- Alexander Hernandez, serial killer
- Shazer Fernando Limas, murderer who killed his girlfriend and two young children.
- Jose Luis Orozco, murderer who killed Los Angeles Deputy Sheriff Jerry Ortiz on June 24, 2005. Sentenced to death.
- Herbert “Peanut” Tom, murderer who killed 4 in a drive by shooting in Calexico, California, on December 9, 1998.
