= Bellingham Police Department =

Municipal police force in the United States

City of Bellingham Police Department
- Municipal Flag
- Common name: Bellingham Police · Bellingham PD
- Abbreviation: BPD
- Motto: Committed to Community

Agency overview
- Formed: 1904; 122 years ago
- Annual budget: $34.7 million (2021)

Jurisdictional structure
- Operations jurisdiction: Washington, U.S.
- Bellingham Police jurisdiction
- Area: 30.511 square miles (79.02 km^{2})
- Population: 91,482
- Legal jurisdiction: City of Bellingham
- General nature: Local civilian police

Operational structure
- Headquarters: 505 Grand Ave, Bellingham, WA 98225
- Agency executive: Rebecca Mertzig, Chief of Police
- Precincts: 2

Facilities
- Stations: Bellingham Police Headquarters, and Downtown WTA Precinct

Website
- Official website

The City of Bellingham Police Department, more commonly known as the Bellingham Police Department and its initials BPD, is the primary law enforcement and investigation agency within the Bellingham, Washington city limits. Bellingham Police Department is the largest Police Department within Whatcom County, Washington and any other municipal agency north of the Seattle Metropolitan area. Bellingham Police Department is nationally accredited by the Washington Association of Sheriffs and Police Chiefs.

== History ==
On January 12, 1979, Bellingham Police arrested the prolific Hillside Strangler in Bellingham. Chief Terry Mangan was among the officers on the case: he would later serve as chief of the Spokane Police Department and work for the FBI.

In 2002, a Jamaican woman named Una James came to Bellingham to search for her son, Lee Boyd Malvo, who had fallen under the influence of John Allen Muhammad. Bellingham Police alerted immigration authorities to James's presence; she and Malvo were arrested. Malvo and Muhammad would commit the Beltway sniper attacks later that year. An area immigration attorney commented that an immigrant going to the police for help and being arrested instead was common; the Seattle Post-Intelligencer noted that the arrest may have served to separate James and Malvo and draw Malvo closer to Muhammad.

In 2008, a Bellingham Police car was stolen when an officer left it running in a parking lot while responding to a call. The car was found a half hour later with two flat tires and missing its radio microphones.

In 2013, Bellingham Police attempted to break up a 500-person riot near Western Washington University after students began throwing beer bottles and other objects at idling police cars. Police used riot gear, pepper balls, smoke and flash grenades. It remains unclear what started the riot.

In May 2016, Bellingham Police became an acknowledged National accredited law enforcement agency by the Washington Association of Sheriffs and Police Chiefs (WASPC)

In May 2017, a Bellingham officer fatally shot a man after he charged the officer with a knife. The man was a suspect in a stabbing the previous year.

In 2017, Officer Brooks Laughlin assaulted a man during a traffic stop. Laughlin was arrested twice in 2018 before he resigned from the force in April. In November 2018, he was convicted of three counts of second-degree assault, two counts of felony harassment, two counts of violating a no-contact order, one count of felony stalking and one count of fourth-degree assault. Court papers state that he was the third Bellingham police officer in three years to be arrested for assault.

An initiative on the November 2021 ballot banned the Bellingham Police Department, and the rest of the Bellingham city government, from the use of facial recognition and predictive policing technology.

In 2024, the Bellingham Police Department unveiled a new badge design for future use. The new badge features the Old City Hall, now the Whatcom Museum in Present day. The previous eagle-top design was considered "generic" and could be mistaken for a counterfeit badge. This marks the fourth design change to the badge since the department's establishment in 1904, when it was housed in the Old City Hall.

== Responsibilities ==
The Bellingham Police Departments main responsibility is to deter crime, assist the local community and Provide law enforcement services to all citizens of Bellingham, Washington.

BPD also works alongside the local metropolitan police force Whatcom County Sheriff's Office, as they are located in the heart of downtown Bellingham just a few doors down from the BPD headquarters. BPD officers have direct contact with WCSO staff everyday as they assist each other on traffic stops and other incidents at times, and the Sheriff's Office is responsible for county-wide corrections.

The Bellingham Police Department is the main law enforcement agency of the city of Bellingham, except for the campus of the Western Washington University, which is under the responsibility of WWU Police.

BPD has a number of specialty units including SWAT, bike patrol, motorcycles, "Walking the Beat", and a variety of detective units.

== Additional Services ==
The Bellingham Police Department began their Community service officer Program in 2022 after trialing the Downtown Safety Ambassador Program previously. BPD employs Community Service Officers (CSOs) to provide assistance to both the department and the public. CSOs, who are not sworn Police officers, carry out a range of tasks to aid various departments, with a focus on public safety.

BPD also runs a youth Cadet Program called the Bellingham Police Explorers. The academy typically occurs at Yakima Training Center.
