= Jennifer Tisdale =

American actress (born 1981)

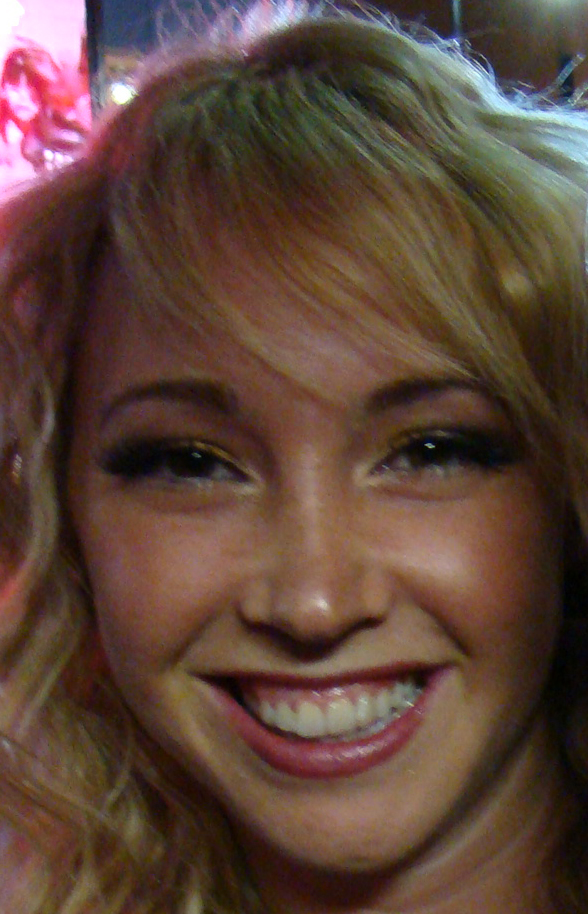
- Tisdale in January 2008
- Born: Jennifer Kelly Tisdale; September 18, 1981 (age 44)
- Education: California State University, Northridge
- Occupation: Actress
- Years active: 2000–2010
- Spouse: Shane McChesnie (m. 2009; div. 2011)
- Children: 1
- Relatives: Ashley Tisdale (sister)

Jennifer Kelly Tisdale (born September 18, 1981) is an American former actress.

== Early life ==
Tisdale was born on September 18, 1981 to Lisa Morris and contractor Michael Tisdale. Her sister is singer and actress Ashley Tisdale. Her father is Christian, and her mother is Jewish; she, along with her sister, were raised with "a little bit of both" religions. At age 7, she performed at Asbury Park's Jewish Community Center in the Teen Center Players' production of Gypsy; Tisdale portrayed Baby Louise, the title character's pre-teen incarnation.

A cheerleader in high school and college, Tisdale went to Cal State Northridge and graduated with a Screenwriting degree.

== Career ==
Tisdale's acting credits include main characters in the movies The Hillside Strangler and Dark Ride. She played Chelsea in the movie Bring It On: In It to Win It and also recorded a track titled "Don't You Think I'm Hot", which can be heard in the film. She also had a role in the MTV series Undressed. Guest star roles include Clubhouse, Raising Dad, Boston Public and others. Tisdale also appeared in her sister Ashley Tisdale's "He Said, She Said" music video in various scenes.

== Personal life ==
She married Shane McChesnie, who manages a restaurant in Los Angeles, in a private ceremony on August 7, 2009, in New Jersey; Ashley Tisdale, her younger sister, was the maid of honor. Together they have a daughter. The couple divorced in 2011 after being separated for some time.

== Filmography ==
=== Film ===
Year	Title	Role	Notes
2002	Mr. Deeds	Card Reader	
2002	Ted Bundy	Pretty Girl	
2004	The Hillside Strangler	Erin	
2006	Dark Ride	Liz	
2007	Bring It On: In It to Win It	Chelsea	Direct-to-video
2008	The House Bunny	Phi Iota Mu member #5	
2010	The Brazen Bull	Lauren Vinyec	

=== Television ===
Year	Title	Role	Notes
2000	City Guys	Cheerleader	Episode: "Shock Treatment"
2001	Boston Public	Katie Cooper	Episode: "Chapter 26"
2001	Undressed	Betsy	Main role (season 5)
2002	Raising Dad	Erin	Episode: "Home Plates"
2004	Clubhouse	Cheerleader	Episode: "Pilot"
2004	Grounded for Life	Amy	Episode: "Day Tripper"
2007	The Suite Life of Zack & Cody	Saloon girl	Episode: "The Suite Life Goes Hollywood: Part 2"
2008	The Suite Life on Deck	Connie	2 episodes

== Discography ==
Year	Title	Album
2007	"Don't You Think I'm Hot"	Bring It On: In It to Win It
