= Julia Lee (actress) =

American actress (born 1975)

- Born: Julia Lee; July 14, 1975 (age 51); Atlanta, Georgia, U.S.
- Education: University of California, Irvine
- Occupation: Actress
- Years active: 1997–2016
- Spouse: Spencer Stander (m. 2002)
- Children: 1

Julia Lee Stander (born July 14, 1975) is an American former actress. Her roles include Chantarelle/Lily/Anne Steele in Buffy the Vampire Slayer and Angel (1997–2004). She has also appeared in Charmed.

In 2006, Disneyland refurbished its Haunted Mansion attraction. For this project, Julia became the face and body of the character, Constance Hatchaway (voice by Kat Cressida). In 2007, Lee and Cressida's version of Constance was also installed in Walt Disney World's Mansion.

Julia and her husband, Spencer, run a company called 'Stander Productions'. Together they have one child.

== Filmography ==
=== Film ===
Year	Title	Role	Notes
2003	A Man Apart	Spa Receptionist	
2003	Hellborn	Lauren	
2003	Grind	Another Hot Girl	
2004	The Hillside Strangler	Lisa Erwin	
2006	After I'm Gone	Flapper	Short film
2012	Goldenstate	Julia	Short film
2016	Unreal Estate	Stacey Jones	

=== Television ===
Year	Title	Role	Notes
1997, 1998	Buffy the Vampire Slayer	Chanterelle, Lily Houston	One episode, each character
2000	Charmed	Young Gail	Episode: "How to Make a Quilt Out of Americans"
2001–2004	Angel	Anne Steele	3 episodes
2006	Free Ride	Maya	Episode: "Missouri Loves Company"
