= Alexander Hernandez (serial killer) =

American serial killer

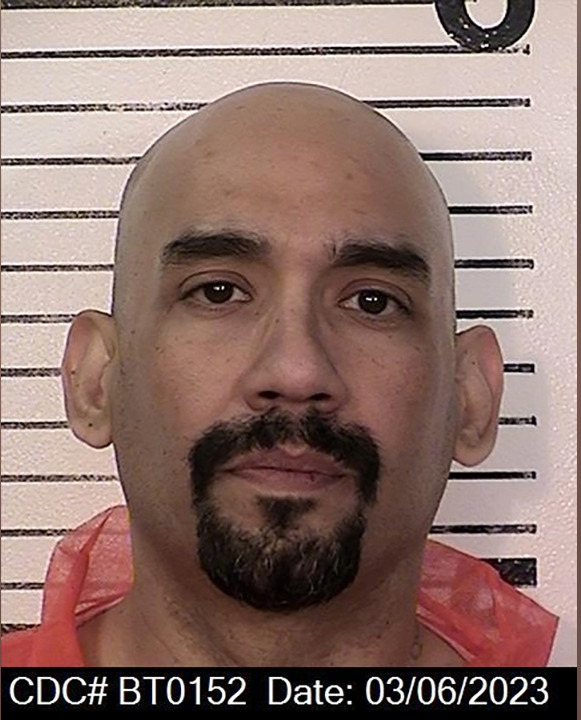
- Born: May 12, 1980 (age 46); Sylmar, Los Angeles, California, U.S
- Other name: "The Valley Killer"
- Years active: 2014
- Status: Incarcerated
- Convictions: Murder (5 counts); Attempted murder (11 counts); Shooting at an occupied motor vehicle (8 counts); Animal cruelty (3 counts); Possession of a firearm by a felon (2 counts); Possession of ammunition by a felon and negligent discharge of firearm (1 count)
- Penalty: Life imprisonment without possibility of parole

Details
- Victims: 5 killed; 11 survived
- Span of crimes: March – August 2014
- Country: United States
- State: California
- Location: Los Angeles metropolitan area
- Weapons: Handgun; shotgun
- Date apprehended: August 24, 2014
- Imprisoned at: Calipatria State Prison, Calipatria, California

Alexander Hernandez (born May 12, 1980) is an American serial killer who murdered five people during a series of drive-by shootings in the Los Angeles Metropolitan area of California between March and August 2014. He targeted victims at random, murdering five people, injuring 11 others, and killing two dogs. He was later convicted of the crimes and sentenced to life imprisonment without the possibility of parole.

== Early life ==
Alexander Hernandez was born on May 12, 1980. Hernandez had previous vandalism, drug possession, and weapons convictions dating back to 2004. In 2010, Hernandez's former girlfriend filed a restraining order against him because she feared the safety of herself and her children.

In June 2014, he was arrested after threatening his cousin with a knife. However, prosecutors refused to charge him.

== Shootings ==
On March 14, 2014, Hernandez shot 35-year-old Sergio Sanchez to death while both of them were driving on the 210 Freeway in Sylmar. Sanchez, who had been driving home, was discovered dead in his own car on an off-ramp.

On April 27, 2014, a man was injured after being shot in his car parked in front of a Pacoima apartment building. On May 11, 2014, Hernandez shot a 19-year-old man during a car-to-car shooting in Northridge. The victim, who had dropped his girlfriend off after their high school prom, was left partially paralyzed as a result of the shooting. At 6 a.m on June 15, 2014, a man was wounded after being shot in the arm on the 210 Freeway.

During a five-day long shooting spree in August 2014, Hernandez committed seven shootings with a shotgun, leaving four people dead and several others injured. At 6 a.m on August 20, 2014, a 42-year-old woman was shot and wounded in Atwater village as she exited the 5 freeway. On the same day, Hernandez shot at three dogs while driving near his home, killing two of them. At 5 a.m on the following day, he fatally shot Gildardo Morales, a 59-year-old man who was driving to work in his pickup truck in the Pacoima neighborhood of San Fernando Valley. On August 22, he shot at a couple in their pickup truck at West Hollywood. Both were able to escape unharmed.

At 5:50 a.m on August 24, 2014, the Franco family, who were driving to church, noticed Hernandez driving erratically behind them. When they pulled over at the 1400 block of Celis Street in San Fernando, Hernandez opened fire into the vehicle, murdering 22-year-old Mariana Franco and critically injuring her parents. Her siblings were also in the vehicle, but left unharmed. 40 minutes later, Michael Planells, 29, was fatally shot while searching for items to recycle in the parking lot of the Sylmar Recreational Center. Hernandez then exited the parking lot and drove to the 12900 block of Filmore Street in Pacoima, where he fatally shot 59-year-old Gloria Tovar as she sat in her car.

== Arrest and trial ==
On the evening August 24, 2014, Hernandez was taken into custody by a Los Angeles police SWAT team after he barricaded himself in his home for an hour. At the residence, they found the pistol-grip shotgun used in the August shootings. Hernandez was initially only charged with the August shootings, and wasn't linked to the earlier attacks until 2015. Despite being arrested in 2014, his trial did not begin until 2022 because his mental competency was questioned at various points, and his trial had been put on hold for 18 months due to the COVID-19 pandemic. Prosecutors originally sought the death penalty against Hernandez, but George Gascón, the district attorney of Los Angeles County, barred prosecutors from seeking capital punishment in 2020.

On May 25, 2022, Hernandez was sentenced to life imprisonment without parole after being found guilty of five counts of murder, 11 counts of attempted murder, eight counts of shooting at an occupied motor vehicle, three counts of animal cruelty, two counts of possession of a firearm by a felon, and one count of possession of ammunition by a felon and negligent discharge of firearm. Hernandez is currently incarcerated in the Correctional Training Facility Soledad.

== See also ==
- Gun violence in the United States
- Dale Hausner and Samuel Dieteman
