= The Brazen Bull =

- Directed by: Douglas Elford-Argent
- Written by: Thomas Bilyeu; Chris Van de Polder
- Produced by: David Fletcher; Charles Arthur Berg; Michael Madsen
- Starring: Jennifer Tisdale; Michael Madsen; Rachel Hunter; Gwendolyn Garver; David Frank Fletcher. Jr; Nills Allan Stewart
- Music by: Tim Williams
- Distributed by: Alliance Films
- Release date: July 13, 2011
- Running time: 85 minutes
- Country: United States
- Language: English

The Brazen Bull is a 2011 American thriller/horror film released on July 13. It was written, directed, and produced by Douglas Elford-Argent. It stars Jennifer Tisdale as the main role and Michael Madsen as the killer. It was released on DVD on September 2, 2011.

== Plot ==
A nameless serial killer torments the people of Los Angeles.

== Cast ==
- Jennifer Tisdale as Lauren Vinyec
- Michael Madsen as The Man
- Gwendolyn Garver as Ashley
- David Frank Fletcher Jr. as Tyler
- Rachel Hunter as Natasha Vinyec
- Nills Allen Stewart as Detective Miller
- Anastasia McPherson as Lilly
- Shannon Kingston as Lisa Klein (Amelia Kingston)
- Elissa Dowling as Lola
- Christian Madsen as Billy
- Marek Motousek as Homeless Person
- Tom Riles as The Photographer
- Steve Shaheen as Paramedic

== Critical reception ==
The film received mixed-to-negative reviews from critics, scoring a 12% audience approval rating on Rotten Tomatoes. Head of Virgil Productions said of the film that "It's very much your typical revenge story taken to a more sinister blood spraying level. Madsens character of the absolute Psycho takes me back to his Reservoir Dogs days. The movie has its moments, Rachel Hunters performance could have used a bit more work, accent was slipping in and out from American to Kiwi. Loved the level of gore, The fact its all filmed in one location makes it an easy watch and keeps your attention. Michael Madsen continues to impress me with his awesome roles, I'll never stop admiring his work."

== Production Companies ==
- 30 Something Productions
- Libra-Con Productions
- Luckster Productions
