= Dark Ride (film) =

- Theatrical release poster
- Directed by: Craig Singer
- Written by: Craig Singer; Robert Dean Klein
- Produced by: Daniel Bickel; Chris M. Williams
- Starring: Jamie-Lynn Sigler; Patrick Renna; Jennifer Tisdale; Andrea Bogart
- Cinematography: Vincent E. Toto
- Edited by: Sam Bauer
- Music by: Kostas Christides
- Production companies: My2Centences; Blue Omega Entertainment
- Distributed by: Lionsgate; After Dark Films
- Release date: November 17, 2006 (After Dark Horrorfest)
- Running time: 90 minutes
- Country: United States
- Language: English
- Budget: ~$5 million
- Box office: $321,875

Dark Ride is a 2006 American slasher film directed by Craig Singer and written by Singer and Robert Dean Klein. It was selected to play at the "8 Films To Die For" film festival, as one of the first eight films to be featured in the festival's series. The film revolves around a group of friends who are terrorized by a crazy masked murderer at a dark ride in Asbury Park.

== Plot ==
Twin teenage girls, Sam and Colleen, enter the mysterious Dark Ride. Sam, who is tough and competitive, gets annoyed at Colleen because she is anxious and scared. The killer kidnaps Sam and slices her stomach, then brutally kills Colleen.

10 years later, Cathy and Liz are getting ready for spring break. They decide to take a road trip with three of their male friends, Bill, Steve, and Jim. The friends embark together in Jim's van and meet a hitchhiker named Jen. While at a gas station, Bill wanders around trying to find the bathroom. When he rejoins the others, he claims to have found a pamphlet about the Dark Ride reopening after many years of closure. The group decides to make a detour to the amusement park and spend the night in the Dark Ride attraction. Once they arrive, Cathy decides to stay in the van while the others go into the ride. Unbeknownst to them, the killer, named Jonah, has escaped from a mental hospital after killing two orderlies.

Liz, Steve, Jim, and Jen find a door inside. Jim switches on the power, illuminating the lights and launching the ride, along with its scary theatrical effects. The four then sit and smoke marijuana. Bill tells them about the two girls who were killed 10 years earlier and reveals that they were his cousins. After some initial skepticism, the others eventually believe him. Jen and Jim wander into the hallway to fool around. Jen sees something and notices Cathy's fake corpse sitting in a chair with her throat slashed. The prank was meant to be pulled on Steve, who is livid due to the trauma. Cathy argues with him, and they both stop fighting when Bill breaks it up. Steve, angry about the prank, wanders off by himself.

The others are moving along when the power goes out. Jim goes to the basement to fix it, and Jen follows him down and starts fellating him. Jonah slides through a hidden entrance on the floor and cuts off Jen's head. Jim tries to run but hits his head on a pipe and knocks himself out. Meanwhile, Liz, Cathy, and Bill start trying to find their way out of the ride when they stumble upon Steve's mutilated corpse. Frightened, the girls run one way, and Bill goes the other way.

After Cathy finds Liz's body, a policeman arrives and tries to help her, but Jonah slashes his head in half with a machete. Cathy jumps out of an opening and gets into the van. Jonah attacks Jim with a sickle, but Cathy drives the van into the building, impaling Jonah on a wall of spikes, killing him and causing her to pass out. Bill appears and reveals that he and Jonah are brothers and fatally stabs Jim. Bill thanks Cathy, who runs out of the Dark Ride and falls to her knees as she hears sirens approaching. The film ends showing what appears to be Bill wearing Jonah's mask.

== Production and release ==
Filming began 25 October 2004 and finished 19 November 2004. The film saw a limited release on November 17, 2006, at the After Dark Horrorfest, an event in which movies "too graphic" for theaters are finally shown to the public for one weekend only, across several states in the US.

The DVD was released on March 27, 2007.

== Cast ==
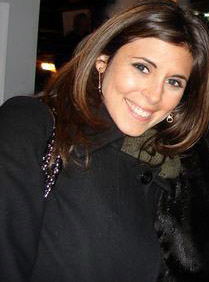
Jamie-Lynn Sigler stars in the film as Cathy.

- Jamie-Lynn Sigler as Cathy
- Patrick Renna as Bill
- Jennifer Tisdale as Liz
- David Clayton Rogers as Steve
- Alex Solowitz as Jim
- Andrea Bogart as Jen
- Brittany Coyle as Colleen
- Chelsea Coyle as Samantha
- David Warden as Jonah
- Jim Williams as Ticket Taker
- Erin Dawson as Hippie
- Jack Doner as Old Man
- David Ury as Attendant #1
- Atticus Todd as Attendant #2
- Steve Mattila as Homeless Man
- Damon Standifer as Reggie
- Julie Bickel as Teen Female #1
- Jessica Lobaina as Teen Female #2
