= Angelo Buono Jr. =

American serial killer (1934–2002)

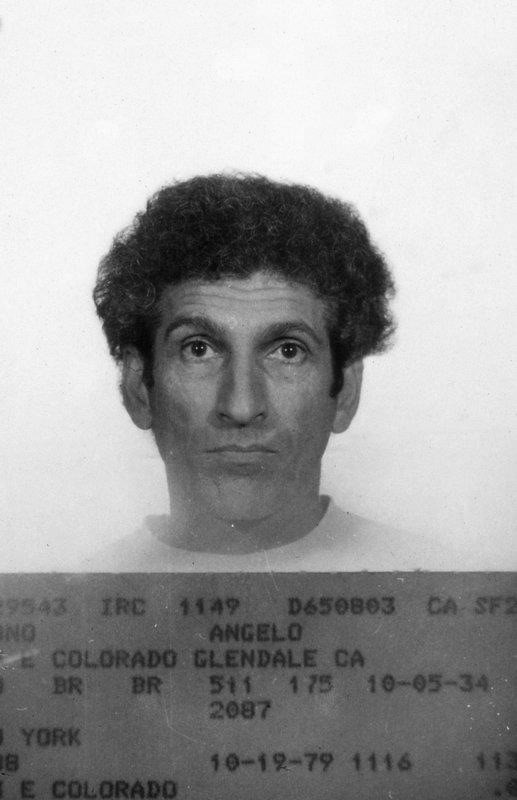
- Buono's 1979 mug shot
- Born: Angelo Anthony Buono Jr. October 5, 1934; Rochester, New York, U.S.
- Died: September 21, 2002 (aged 67); Calipatria State Prison, Calipatria, California, U.S.
- Other name: The Hillside Strangler
- Spouses: Geraldine Vinal (m. 1956; div. 1956) Mary Castillo (m. 1957; div. 1964) Deborah Taylor (m. 1972) Christine Kizuka (m. 1986)
- Children: 8
- Convictions: First degree murder with special circumstances (9 counts); Assault; Rape; Failure to pay child support; Grand theft auto
- Penalty: Life imprisonment without the possibility of parole

Details
- Victims: 10
- Span of crimes: October 17, 1977 – February 17, 1978
- Country: United States
- State: California
- Date apprehended: October 22, 1979
- Imprisoned at: Calipatria State Prison

Angelo Anthony Buono Jr. (/buːˈoʊnoʊ/; October 5, 1934 – September 21, 2002) was an American serial killer, kidnapper and rapist who, together with his adopted cousin Kenneth Bianchi, raped and murdered ten young women and girls between October 1977 and February 1978 in Los Angeles, California in what became known as the Hillside Strangler murders, as the victims were usually strangled to death and dumped on a hillside. In November 1983, after a two-year-long trial, Buono was convicted of 9 counts of murder and subsequently sentenced to life imprisonment.

Although Buono began killing in 1977, he previously had a lengthy rap sheet of convictions, ranging from failure to pay child support to car theft. He began committing crimes as a teenager, primarily petty theft which he committed alongside a group of youths, then it escalated into stealing a car in his mid-teens. Buono also had a history of violence, mostly sexual, towards women ever since he was young. As an adult, Buono frequently forced young women to perform oral sex on him and held them in captivity for days, forcing them to "turn tricks" for customers of his upholstery business.

Following his arrest for the Hillside Strangler murders, Buono maintained his innocence, even after being convicted. At one point, he accused the court of "violating his constitutional rights". Buono died of a heart attack on September 21, 2002, at age 67 while he was serving his life sentence. He never expressed any remorse for his crimes.

== Personal life ==
Angelo Anthony Buono Jr. was born on October 5, 1934, in Rochester, New York, the son of Sicilian immigrants from Caltagirone. He moved to Glendale, California at five years old. As a teenager, Buono began blaming his mother for his parents' divorce, and calling her demeaning names such as "whore", and idolized rapist Caryl Chessman. He also boasted to his friends about raping and sodomizing girls. He dropped out of school at age 16. In 1951, he was sent to reformatory school, but escaped shortly afterwards with several other youths.

Throughout his adult life, Buono had fathered eight children and got married four times, including once in prison, though during the murders, he was unmarried. He also piled up an extensive criminal record, ranging from grand theft auto, rape, pimping and failure to pay child support. On January 10, 1956, 17-year-old Geraldine Vinal, Buono's first wife, gave birth to his first son, Michael Lee Buono. He divorced her shortly afterwards and refused to pay child support. On April 15, 1957, Buono married his second wife, Mary Catherine "Candy" Castillo, aged 17, with whom Buono had five children. One night in late 1963, Buono dragged Candy by the hair to the living room, tossed her on the floor and assaulted her in full view of their children because she had rejected his advances. In May 1964, Candy filed for divorce, citing Buono's aggressive and perverse sexual desires and his unpredictable violence. A year later, Buono moved in with 25-year-old Nanette Campina, a single mother of two. He treated her similarly to how he had treated Candy; physically and sexually abusing her, to the point where she was afraid to leave him because she thought he might kill her. Buono had two children with Campina, born in 1967 and 1969, respectively. Shortly before the birth of Buono's first child with Campina, he was given a one-year suspended sentence for stealing a car.

In 1971, Buono began sexually abusing his 14-year-old stepdaughter, which caused Campina to leave Buono, taking the children with her. In 1972, Buono married Deborah Taylor, his third wife, and moved in with a male roommate shortly afterwards. Buono never moved in with Taylor and didn't bother getting a divorce. On one occasion, the roommate witnessed Buono watching school children through binoculars while masturbating.

In May 1975, Buono, aged 40, moved into his own place and opened up his own upholstery shop at 703 East Colorado Street, in northeast Glendale. He reportedly reveled in the fact that he was Italian and hung up the Italian flag on top of his shop. He began calling himself the "Italian Stallion" and earned a reputation for being a "stud", having multiple young girlfriends at once, some as young as 13, impressing the girls with his fancy clothing and expensive jewelry, such as a gold chain and a large turquoise ring. In July 1975, Buono began dating a teenaged girl, whom he impregnated twice. He forced her to abort the first child, while the second pregnancy ended in a miscarriage. While the girl stayed loyal to Buono, he frequently had sexual relations with other young women.

In January 1976, Buono's adoptive cousin, 24-year-old Kenneth Bianchi moved in with him. Bianchi was a criminal himself, having been arrested numerous times, mostly for petty theft. When Bianchi arrived to his cousin's home, he discovered that Buono had been holding four teenaged girls in his home virtually as prisoners, a sight which Bianchi described as a "junior harem". Bianchi later claimed that two of Buono's sons, Peter and Danny, often brought their own girlfriends to their father's place to be used for sex. In August 1976, about seven months after his cousin had moved in, Buono practically "threw [Bianchi] out of the house", after having grown tired of having him at his house so often. In June 1977, Bianchi met 16-year-old Sabra Hannan, from Phoenix, Arizona, and brought her to Buono's residence under a false pretense of nude photography in exchange for money as the girl had run out of cash. One night, Buono and Bianchi stripped her, beat her with a wet towel and then raped her. The girl was held as a prisoner for the following three months; she endured harsh beatings from the pair and was forced to "turn tricks" for customers at Buono's upholstery shop, which he used to bolster the business. The girl was sometimes starved for days at a time. In early September, Sabra escaped her captivity by running away during an "outside job".

In the fall of 1977, Buono and Bianchi began discussing the idea of pimping young women as a way to make money. The idea was initially proposed by Buono as they were short on cash. By this point, according to Bianchi, he and Buono had already started talking about the possibility of killing someone. On October 16, 1977, Buono and Bianchi paid two sex workers; 18-year-old Deborah Noble and 19-year-old Yolanda Washington, who was also a part-time waitress, $175 for a list of their clients, known as a "trick list" in slang. The latter told Buono that she frequented a street on Sunset Boulevard. Shortly afterwards, the two found out the list was fake, and, infuriated, they pursued Noble and Washington to get revenge for the money they'd paid. On October 17 evening, Buono and Bianchi raped Washington in the back of Bianchi's car before strangling her to death. Soon afterwards, the pair embarked on a five-month killing spree which left nine more young women and girls dead; strangled with a garrote and then dumped naked on wooded hillsides across Los Angeles.

== Murders ==
In October 1977, Buono and Bianchi began killing women. Cruising around Los Angeles, California, in Buono's car and using fake badges, the two men persuaded their victims that they were undercover police officers. They would then order the victims into Bianchi's Cadillac, which they claimed was an unmarked police car, and drive to Buono's home, where they typically raped and sodomized them before killing them. The women and girls ranged in age from 12 to 28. The confirmed victims were:

- Yolanda Washington, age 19 – October 17, 1977
- Judith Lynn Miller, age 15 – October 31, 1977
- Lissa Kastin, age 21 – November 5, 1977
- Jane King, age 28 – November 9, 1977
- Dolores Cepeda, age 12 – November 13, 1977
- Sonja Johnson, age 14 – November 13, 1977
- Kristina Weckler, age 20 – November 20, 1977
- Lauren Wagner, age 18 – November 28, 1977
- Kimberly Martin, age 17 – December 13, 1977
- Cindy Lee Hudspeth, age 20 – February 16, 1978

Both Buono and Bianchi would sexually abuse their victims before strangling them. They experimented with other methods of killing, such as lethal injection, electric shock, and carbon monoxide poisoning. Even while committing the murders, Bianchi applied for a job with the Los Angeles Police Department (LAPD) and had even been taken for several rides with police officers while they were searching for the Hillside Strangler.

== Arrest, trial and conviction ==
In January 1979, Bianchi was arrested in connection with the murders of two women in Bellingham, Washington. After pleading guilty, Bianchi was quickly linked to the Hillside Strangler murders in California. In order to avoid the death penalty, Bianchi named Buono as the other perpetrator in the Hillside Strangler case and agreed to testify against him. On October 22, 1979, Buono was arrested at his upholstery shop in Glendale and charged with 24 felonies, including murder, sodomy and rape. Upon his arrival at the Los Angeles County Jail, Buono was assigned to Highpower, a supersecurity section designed for prisoners who were at "high risk" from other inmates, primarily informers or rapists whose victims were young. One day, an inmate had asked Buono why he killed all those girls, to which he reportedly replied: "They were no good. They deserved to die. It had to be done. But I only killed a couple of 'em. I ain't worried."

The preliminary hearing on Buono lasted for 10 months. The legal case against Buono was based largely upon Bianchi's testimony. After Bianchi made repeated self-contradictory statements in order to diminish his own credibility as a witness to have the case against Buono dismissed, the case's original prosecutors from District Attorney John Van de Kamp's office moved to dismiss all charges against Buono and set him free. On July 21, 1981, the presiding judge, Ronald M. George, refused to release Buono, believing there was sufficient probable cause to believe Buono had committed murder, and reassigned the case to California Attorney General George Deukmejian's office.

Buono's trial would become the longest in American legal history, lasting from November 1981 until November 1983, with nearly 400 witnesses testifying. Jury selection for Buono's trial was completed in the spring of 1982. In June 1982, Bianchi took the stand and, once again, purposely made contradictory statements. In fact, one of the prosecutors warned the jury to "expect some lies" during Bianchi's testimony. The prosecutors played Bianchi's taped confession to the jury. Throughout the trial, the jurors were taken on a series of excursions to the sites where the victims were abducted or dumped, including the exact spot where the bodies of Sonja Johnson and Dolores Cepeda were discovered. The jury was also shown the graphic photos of the murdered women's corpses. During the trial, the defense attorneys called ten character witnesses for Buono, including his older sister, who testified that Buono was a "non-violent person" who cared for their cancer-stricken mother the same year that the killings had occurred. The prosecutors, in turn, called one of Buono's boyhood friends, who testified that Buono "talked about rape all the time."

The jury returned 10 verdicts from October 30 to November 14, 1983; convicting Buono of 9 counts of murder. He was found not guilty in the murder of Yolanda Washington. On November 16, Buono took the stand for the first time. When asked what the appropriate punishment for him would be, he replied: "My morals and constitutional rights have been broken. I ain't taking any procedure in this trial." The prosecutors called for the death penalty, describing Buono and Bianchi's acts as "worse than animals." After one hour of deliberation, on January 4, 1984, Buono was sentenced to life imprisonment. Judge George concluded the two-year long trial by commenting that the death sentence was the appropriate punishment for both Buono and Bianchi, adding that the two "should never see the outside of a jail cell again."

== Detention, death and aftermath ==
Shortly after his sentencing, Buono was initially sent to Folsom State Prison, where he refused to come out of his cell due to fear of injury by other inmates, before being transferred. In 1986, Buono married for the fourth time; Christine Kizuka, a mother of three and a supervisor at the California State Employment Development Department. He died of a heart attack on September 21, 2002, in his jail cell while incarcerated at Calipatria State Prison. His body was cremated.

In 2007, Buono's grandson, Christopher Buono, committed suicide shortly after shooting his grandmother, Mary Castillo, in the head. Castillo was at one time married to Buono, and had five children with him, including Chris's father. Chris Buono was unaware of his grandfather's true identity until 2005.

== Media ==
In the 1989 film The Case of the Hillside Stranglers, Buono was portrayed by actor Dennis Farina. In the 2004 film The Hillside Strangler, Buono was portrayed by actor Nicholas Turturro and in Rampage: The Hillside Strangler Murders (2006), he was played by Tomas Arana.

== See also ==
- List of serial killers in the United States
- List of serial killers by number of victims

== General and cited sources ==
- Foreman, Laura (2005). Compulsion to Kill. London: Time Life Value. ISBN 978-1-844471-08-9.
