= Martin Theodore Orne =

American physician

1996 portrait by John Boyd Martin

Martin Theodore Orne (October 16, 1927 – February 11, 2000) was a professor of psychiatry and psychology at the University of Pennsylvania. Orne is best known for his pioneering research into demand characteristics, illustrating the weakness of informing participants that they are taking part in a psychology experiment and yet expecting them to act normally. He was well known as a researcher in the field of hypnosis and is also noted for his involvement with the poet Anne Sexton, and with the trials of Patty Hearst and Kenneth Bianchi.

== Personal life and education ==
Orne was born on October 16, 1927, to Frank Orne, a surgeon and Martha Brunner, a psychiatrist in Vienna, Austria. His family moved from Austria to escape the Nazi Anschluss and relocated to New York City in 1938.

He studied at the Bronx High School of Science. He later moved to Boston and studied at Harvard University. Orne enlisted in the U.S. Army during World War II and returned to Harvard afterward. He graduated cum laude in 1948. While at Harvard, he studied under the psychologists Henry Murray and Robert White. Orne received his M.D. degree from Tufts University Medical School in 1955, with a residency in psychiatry at Massachusetts Mental Health Center. In 1958, he received his Ph.D. in psychology from Harvard University.

Orne was married to psychologist, Emily Carota Orne, whom he collaborated with throughout his career. He had two children, Tracey and Franklin. Orne died of cancer on February 11, 2000, in Paoli, Pennsylvania; he was 72.

== Work ==
Orne's main research was concerned with the objective study of subjective states of mind. Of particular significance was Orne's characterisation of the hypnotic state of consciousness, which included a phenomenon called "trance logic". The latter refers to "the apparent tendency of hypnotized individuals to engage simultaneously in logically contradictory or paradoxical thoughts and perceptions and to be oblivious to their incongruity. It has been suggested that trance logic represents evidence of parallel processing in that there appears to be simultaneous registration of information at different levels of awareness" [ APA Dictionary of Psychology, 2022]. Orne devoted much of his career to the investigation of memory distortion and hypnosis. His first published paper focused on issues and myths of hypnosis and age regression in adults. In the 1950s, he published the study "The Social Psychology of the Psychological Experiment" which proved that in most experiments, participants tell experimenters what they want to hear in hopes of pleasing the experimenters.

Orne became the therapist to the poet Anne Sexton when she was 28. He recorded their sessions and would have Sexton transcribe them as a way to reflect. He also encouraged Sexton to write poetry. Sexton committed suicide in 1974 and the tapes were later passed to Diane Wood Middlebrook, a Sexton biographer. His decision to release the tapes was controversial and met with backlash; he was accused of "dishonoring his profession" although Sexton gave him permission prior to her death and was given consent by Sexton's daughter, Linda Gray Sexton, her literary executor.

Orne was the editor in chief for the journal International Journal of Clinical and Experimental Hypnosis from 1961 to 1992.

Orne testified as a defense witness during the Patty Hearst trial in 1976; His testimony made the claim that Hearst feared for her life and followed the Symbionese Liberation Army's orders. He later argued that she be pardoned.

In 1979, Orne served as a witness in the Bianchi trial. Orne proved that Bianchi lied about having multiple personalities to avoid being prosecuted. Orne tested Bianchi by introducing him to his lawyer who wasn't present. Bianchi interacted with the imaginary lawyer. Orne then brought in his real lawyer which flustered Bianchi and claimed that the imaginary lawyer vanished. Bianchi pleaded guilty in October 1979.

=== Antisocial Behavior and Manchurian Candidates ===
Orne received CIA funding through Project MKUltra Subproject 84 but was given no special direction for his research.

Orne did not believe it was possible to use hypnosis for the purpose of creating a Manchurian Candidate stating, “When the layman inquires whether hypnosis can be used to induce antisocial behavior, he generally wonders whether a hypnotist can induce trance in a total stranger and then compel him to carry out behavior for his own personal and private benefit--the subject somehow becoming the helpless tool of the powerful hypnotist."..."No authority has seriously maintained that such a total control fantasy could be translated into real life with the help of hypnosis. Fortunately, the Manchurian Candidate still remains fiction.”

Orne sought to prove his stance by replicating experiments previously believed to have demonstrated hypnosis could coerce subjects into "unacceptable” or “antisocial” behavior – such as handling a poisonous snake or throwing acid on a research assistant. By adding a control group of simulators to these experiments, Orne demonstrated that the control group (simulators) were more likely than the hypnotized subjects to perform the requested “antisocial” act. Orne explains that this is because subjects in these experiments, both hypnotized and simulators, trusted that they were not in any real danger. He concludes: “The popular view which holds that hypnosis is able to exert a unique form of control over the hypnotized individual, which can compel him to carry out otherwise repugnant actions, must be rejected.

Orne used the CIA’s money as emergency contingency funds while awaiting grants from other sources. When MKUltra Subproject 84 was discontinued, Orne was allowed to retain the remaining monies, nearly 2/3rds of which he had not yet used.

Orne spent a 3 month sabbatical at the University of Sydney in Australia where he furthered his research into the effects of hypnosis on antisocial behavior, subject-expectancy effect, and demand characteristics.

== Legacy and awards ==
Orne founded and directed the Unit for Experimental Psychiatry at the University of Pennsylvania. He was a professor at the university for 32 years becoming a Professor Emeritus in 1996. At the time of his death in 2000, Orne was an Adjunct Professor Emeritus in Psychology and Professor Emeritus in Psychiatry at the University of Pennsylvania.

Orne received lifetime achievement awards from the American Psychological Association, the American Psychological Society, and the American Academy of Psychiatry and the Law as well as two honorary doctorates.

Orne's work has been cited by the Supreme Court of the United States in over 30 cases. Guidelines were adopted restricting the use of hypnosis as valid testimony in criminal cases.

The "good subject effect" or "participant effect", where a study participant knows what the researcher expects and will behave accordingly, is sometimes referred to as the "Orne effect".

The Center for Inquiry acquired over 250 boxes of material from Orne's wife. The collection was made available to the public in 2015. The collection contains much of Orne's books and scholarly articles. It is shelved in the CFI's special collections.

== Selected works ==
- Orne, Martin T. (1962). "On the social psychology of the psychological experiment: With particular reference to demand characteristics and their implications". American Psychologist. 17 (11): 776–783. doi:10.1037/h0043424.
- Orne, Martin T. (1969). "Demand Characteristics and the Concept of Quasi-Controls". In Rosenthal, Robert; Rosnow, Ralph L. (eds.). Artifacts in Behavioral Research. New York: Academic Press. ISBN 9780195385540.
- Orne, Martin T. (1975). "Hypnosis". In Thompson, Richard F; Lindzey, Gardner; Hall, Calvin S (eds.). Psychology. New York: Worth Publishers. pp. 150–154. ISBN 9780879010362.
- Orne, Martin T. (1980). "On the construct of hypnosis: How its definition affects research and its clinical application". In Dennerstein, Lorraine; Burrows, Graham D (eds.). Handbook of hypnosis and psychosomatic medicine. Amsterdam; New York: Elsevier/North-Holland Biomedical Press. pp. 29–51. ISBN 9780444801487.
- Orne, Martin T. (1985). Hypnotically Refreshed Testimony: Enhanced Memory Or Tampering with Evidence?. DIANE Publishing. ISBN 978-0-7567-1069-9.
