= Tomas Arana =

Italian-American actor

- Born: Thomas Clifford Arana; April 3, 1955 (age 71); Auburn, California, U.S.
- Occupation: Actor
- Years active: 1976 — Present

Thomas Clifford Arana (born April 3, 1955) is an American actor. He appeared in the films The Church (1989), The Hunt for Red October (1990), The Bodyguard (1992), L.A. Confidential (1997), Gladiator (2000), The Bourne Supremacy (2004), Limitless (2011) and The Dark Knight Rises (2012).

== Career ==
Arana has played leading and supporting roles in over 30 European productions including films by directors Lina Wertmüller, Liliana Cavani, Carlo Verdone and Michele Soavi, and with the Japanese director Koreyoshi Kurahara in the Toho production Umi e, See You. He appeared as Quintus in Ridley Scott's Gladiator, Michael Bruening in Curtis Hanson's L.A. Confidential and in the second film of the Bourne series, The Bourne Supremacy.

Arana also played the GRU sleeper agent Loginov in the 1990 film adaptation of Tom Clancy's novel The Hunt for Red October, the would-be killer in 1992's The Bodyguard starring Kevin Costner and Whitney Houston, a Belarusian resistance leader in Edward Zwick's 2008 film Defiance, and The Man In The Tan Coat in 2011's Limitless alongside Bradley Cooper and Robert De Niro. He appeared in the third installment of Christopher Nolan's Batman trilogy, The Dark Knight Rises, as Bruce Wayne's lawyer. In 2013, Arana appeared in the miniseries Crimes of the German television broadcaster ZDF. In 2014, Arana appeared as a Kree ambassador in Guardians of the Galaxy.

In theatre, Arana was a producer and leading actor in the theatre company Falso Movimento, based in Naples, Italy. Under Arana and artistic director Mario Martone, Falso Movimento won many awards including Best Play of the Year and Best Set Design, as well as the Mondello Prize.

== Filmography ==
=== Film ===
Year	Title	Role	Notes
1978	Blood Feud	Fascist	Uncredited role
1979	Atrocious Tales of Love and Death	Walter Navarro	Uncredited role
1981	The Skin	American G.I.	
1986	Incidente di percorso	Rebelsky	
1987	Io e mia sorella	Gábor	
1988	Intimacy	Porter	
1988	The Last Temptation of Christ	Lazarus	
1988	Umi e, See You	Antonio Vázquez	
1988	Domino	Gavros	
1989	The Church	Evan	
1989	Francesco	Learned Brother	Uncredited role
1990	The Hunt for Red October	Matrose Igor Loginov	
1991	The Sect	Damon	
1991	Shadows and Fog	Confessing Man	Uncredited role
1992	Body Puzzle	Michael	
1992	The Bodyguard	Greg Portman	
1993	Over the Line	The Warden	
1993	Tombstone	Frank Stilwell	
1996	First Kid	Harold	
1997	L.A. Confidential	Detective Sergeant Michael Breuning	
1998	Passage to Paradise	Harrison	
1998	Heartwood	Jordan Barrett	
1999	Branchie	Subotnik	
1999	Wildflowers	Wade	
2000	Gladiator	Quintus	
2001	Chimera	Tomas Berti	
2001	Pearl Harbor	Vice Admiral Frank J. Fletcher	
2002	Derailed	Mason Cole	
2003	The Accidental Detective	Matt Brandon	
2003	This Girl's Life	Aronson	
2004	La volpe a tre zampe	Il Generale	
2004	Il servo ungherese	August Dailerman	
2004	The Bourne Supremacy	CIA Director Martin Marshall	
2004	Legami sporchi	Raymond Toom	
2005	Private Property	Nigel	
2006	Rampage: The Hillside Strangler Murders	Angelo Buono	
2008	Defiance	Ben Zion Gulkowitz	
2010	Mission London	Munroe	
2011	The Roommate	Jeff Evans	
2011	Limitless	Man In Coat	
2012	The Dark Knight Rises	Ward Neeley	
2013	The President's Staff	President Harry Carrey	
2013	Romeo & Juliet	Lord Montague	
2014	The Possession of Michael King	Augustine	
2014	Guardians of the Galaxy	Kree Ambassador	
2016	Ustica: The Missing Paper	Fragalà	
2016	Incarnate	Felix	
2017	American Satan	Reporter	
2019	Don't Stop Me Now	Eden Bauen	
2021	Echoes of the Past	General von Le Suire	
2024	Limonov: The Ballad	Steven	

=== Television ===
Year	Title	Role	Notes
1976	The Taming of the Shrew	Clown	TV film
1985	Otello	Iago	TV film
1985	Perfidi incanti	F. Scott Fitzgerald	TV film
1987	Il cespuglio delle bacche velenose	Andrea	TV film
1988	The Prince of Terror	Vincent Omen	TV film
1989	Miami Vice	Walter Stevens	Episode: "Over the Line"
1990	Blue Blood	Ugo Mancini	1 episode
1996	Seduced by Madness	Leon	Miniseries; 2 episodes
1996	The Lazarus Man	Andrew Hawthorne	Episode: "Killer"
1997	The Burning Zone	Professor Herbert Tobler	Episode: "Midnight of the Carrier"
1997	The Hunger	Rick McCabe	Episode: "Red Light"
1998	Walker, Texas Ranger	Jackson Mandell	Episode: "Tribe"
1998	Players	Andrew Pickett	Episode: "Con-undrum"
2001	ER	Rifkin	Episode: "Fear of Commitment"
2001	Law & Order: Criminal Intent	Rudy Langer	Episode: "Art"
2001	Thieves	Honigger	Episode: "Bad Moon Rising"
2002	Il Comissario	L'Americano	Miniseries; 2 episodes
2002	Without a Trace	Chuck	Episode: "Midnight Sun"
2003	CSI: Miami	Mr. Davis	Episode: "Evidence of Things Unseen"
2003	Skin	Garret	Episode: "Secrets & Lies"
2003–2004	Spooks	Herman Joyce	2 episodes
2004	Crossing Jordan	Father Casnelli	Episode: "Til Death Do Us Part"
2004	Frankenfish	Jeff	TV film
2005	24	Dave Conlon	2 episodes
2005	CSI: Crime Scene Investigation	Joseph Diamond	Episode: "Shooting Stars"
2006	In Justice	Detective Ben Dryer	Episode: "Pilot"
2006	Justice League Unlimited	Tharok	Voice, episode: "Far From Home"
2007	Pompeii	Massimo	Miniseries, 2 episodes
2007	Murder 101: If Wishes Were Horses	Rene De Leon	TV film
2007	Bats: Human Harvest	Dr. Benton Walsh	TV film
2008	Rebecca, la prima moglie	Jack Favell	TV film
2008–2009	Tutti pazzi per amore	Riccardo Balstrieri	12 episodes
2009	Lie to Me	Judge Simon	Episode: "The Core of It"
2010	Crimini	Zen	1 episode
2010	Colpo di fulmine	Lorenzo Fieschi	TV film
2012	6 passi nel giallo	Marc Douglas	Episode: "Gemelle"
2013	Project S.E.R.A.	Corvallis	Web series, 6 episodes
2013	Crime Stories	Unbekannter Mann	Episode: "Notwehr"
2014	Intelligence	DNI Adam Weatherly	10 episodes
2016	Code Black	Admiral Stark	Episode: "What Lies Beneath"
2020	The New Pope	Tomas Altbruck	
2021	Succession	Laurie	2 episodes
2024	Mike	Philip Bongiorno	TV film
