= The Hillside Strangler (film) =

- Directed by: Chuck Parello
- Written by: Stephen Johnston
- Starring: C. Thomas Howell; Nicholas Turturro; Marisol Padilla Sánchez
- Music by: Danny Saber
- Release date: October 8, 2004
- Country: United States
- Language: English

The Hillside Strangler is a 2004 horror film directed by Chuck Parello and written by Stephen Johnston, based on the true story of Kenneth Bianchi and Angelo Buono Jr., the Hillside Strangler serial killers. The film stars C. Thomas Howell as Bianchi and Nicholas Turturro as Buono.

== Plot ==
At the end of the 1970s, psychopath Kenneth Bianchi (C. Thomas Howell) lives with his mother Frances (Roz Witt) and is obsessed with joining the police force. When his application is refused, his mother sends him to Los Angeles to live with his sadistic cousin Angelo Buono (Nicholas Turturro). Kenneth unsuccessfully tries to join the LAPD, and Angelo convinces him to start a prostitution business with him. They force Erin (Jennifer Tisdale) and April (Jessica Allegra), two girls from Tucson to work for them, but when they intrude on the territory of another prostitution ring led by Ronnie (Damon Whitaker), their business is destroyed and their money is stolen. The frustrated Kenneth and Angelo decide on revenge against Gabrielle (Kent Masters King) the prostitute who put them into competition with Ronnie, and Kenneth strangles her, feeling great pleasure with her death. The two cousins become addicted to murder, initially killing prostitutes and then attacking single women, dumping their bodies on the hill.

== Cast ==
- C. Thomas Howell as Kenneth Bianchi
- Nicholas Turturro as Angelo Buono Jr.
- Marisol Padilla Sánchez as Christina Chavez (Veronica Compton)
- Allison Lange as Claire Shelton (Kelli Boyd)
- Jennifer Tisdale as Erin (Sabra Hannan)
- Kent Masters King as Gabrielle (Yolanda Washington)
- Aimee Brooks as Felicia Waller (Cindy Hudspeth)
- Natasha Melnick as Karyn (Lauren Wagner)
- Damon Whitaker as Ronnie
- Brandin Rackley as Janice Cooley (Judy Miller)
- Jessica Allegra as April (Becky Spears)
- Roz Witt as Frances Bianchi
- Lin Shaye as Jenny Buono
- Geneviere Anderson as Tina Mayfield (Kimberly Martin)
- Julia Lee as Lisa Erwin (Diane Wilder)
- Kelly Lohman as Sue Radigan (Karen Mandic)
- Tricia Dickson as Heather Brewer
