= Clifton Collins Jr. =

American actor (born 1970)

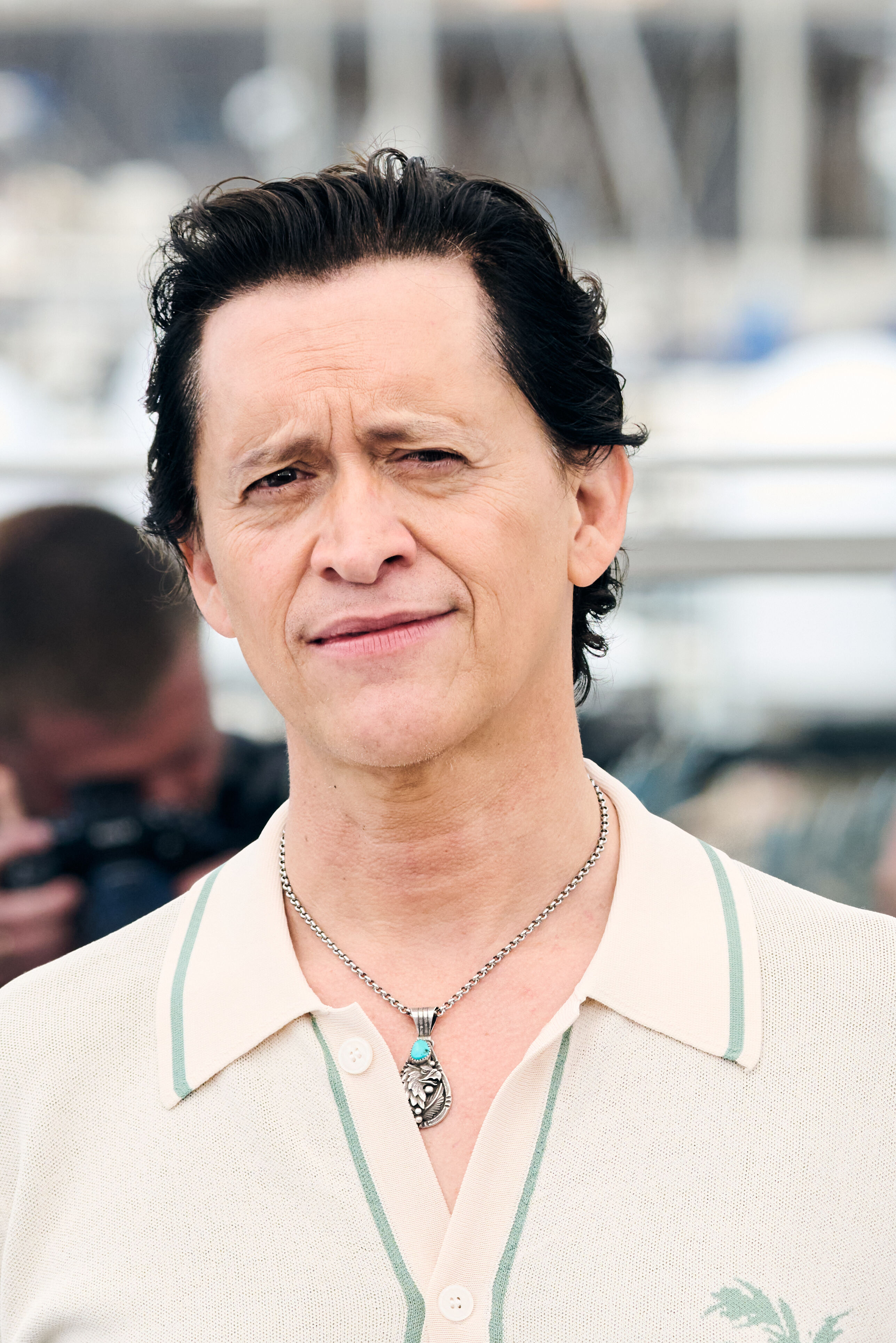
- Collins Jr. at the 2025 Cannes Film Festival
- Born: Clifton Craig Collins Jr. June 16, 1970 (age 56); Los Angeles, California, U.S.
- Other name: Clifton Gonzalez Gonzalez
- Occupations: Actor; author
- Years active: 1990–present
- Height: 5 ft 9 in (175 cm)
- Relatives: Pedro Gonzalez Gonzalez (grandfather); Jose Gonzalez Gonzalez (great-uncle)
- Website: cliftoncollinsjr.com

Clifton Craig Collins Jr. (born June 16, 1970) is an American film and television actor. He is a Primetime Emmy Award, Independent Spirit Award, Satellite Award, and four-time ALMA Award nominee, and a Screen Actors Guild Award winner. Prior to 1999, he was credited as Clifton Gonzalez Gonzalez.

After various small parts, he gained attention for his performance as a gangster in the crime drama One Eight Seven (1997). He then played featured parts in the major productions Traffic (2000) and The Last Castle (2001), and gained further recognition for his co-starring role as Perry Edward Smith in the biographical film Capote (2005). His subsequent films include Babel (2006), Star Trek, Crank: High Voltage (both 2009), Pacific Rim (2013), Knight of Cups (2015), The Mule (2018), Once Upon a Time in Hollywood (2019), and Nightmare Alley (2021). He won a Special Jury Prize at the Sundance Film Festival for his performance in the independent film Jockey (2021).

Collins' work on television series includes a starring role as Jack Hill on Thief (2006), which earned him an Emmy Award nomination, Thomas on The Event (2010–11), Maximo Gomez on Ballers (2015–17), and Lawrence Gonzales / "El Lazo" on Westworld (2016–2020). He also provided the voice of Cesar Vialpando in the action-adventure game Grand Theft Auto: San Andreas (2004).

== Early life ==
Clifton Craig Collins Jr. was born on June 16, 1970 in Los Angeles, California. He is the grandson of actor Pedro Gonzalez Gonzalez. He is sometimes credited as Clifton Gonzalez-Gonzalez in honor of his grandfather. His father is of German descent and his mother is of Mexican ancestry.

== Career ==
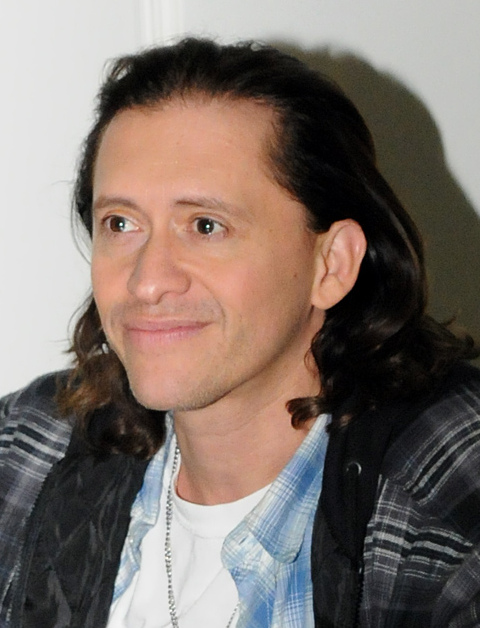
Collins Jr. in 2013

Collins made his acting debut on a 1990 episode of Freddy's Nightmares, and made his film debut the following year in Lawrence Kasdan's Grand Canyon. He played various small roles, notably in the Hughes brothers' Menace II Society (1993) and Dead Presidents (1995), and a more prominent supporting part in the cult action film Fortress (1992). Most notably , he play Tack the Gack in the 90s cult classic “the stoned age”.

He first broke through the mainstream in 1997 with a performance as gangster César Sánchez in the film One Eight Seven. In 1998, he was in the Stuart Gordon-directed, Ray Bradbury-written cult film The Wonderful Ice Cream Suit. He next portrayed a gay hitman named Francisco "Frankie Flowers" Flores for the Mexican drug cartels in Steven Soderbergh's 2000 ensemble drama Traffic.

For his portrayal of a US Marine prisoner in the 2001 film The Last Castle, Collins was nominated for the 2002 American Latino Media Arts (ALMA) Award for Best Supporting Actor in a Motion Picture. In 2002, he played the role of Buddy in the film American Girl.

In 2005, Collins won reviews for his subtle portrayal of killer Perry Smith in the film Capote, which was nominated for the Academy Award for Best Picture in 2006.

He starred in the 2005 film Dirty. Collins starred on FX Networks' series Thief and received an Emmy nomination. Collins also played a supporting role on FX Network's series The Shield as undercover ICE agent Hernan. He also had a small role in 2006's Babel, directed by Alejandro González Iñárritu.

In 2007, Collins took the lead role in the indie feature The Perfect Game, playing former baseball player Cesar Faz, who coaches a local Mexican youth league team, leading them all the way to the Little League World Series.

In 2008, Collins directed two music videos for the country music group Zac Brown Band: "Chicken Fried" and "Whatever It Is". "Chicken Fried" won the 2009 CMT breakthrough music video of the year award.

Collins starred in the comedy Sunshine Cleaning with Amy Adams, Emily Blunt and Alan Arkin. He played Winston, the owner of a cleaning supply shop who builds meticulously detailed model airplanes with only one arm. Collins played the role with one arm bound tightly behind his back. In 2009's Star Trek, Collins plays Ayel, a Romulan, second in command to the villain Nero.

In 2009, Collins joined Adrien Brody and Forest Whitaker in the psychological thriller The Experiment. Collins starred in Extract, a 2009 film by director Mike Judge. He co-produced the film National Lampoon's TV: The Movie in which he played Officer Sanchez alongside Jacob Vargas. He also voiced the fictional video game character Cesar Vialpando in Grand Theft Auto: San Andreas. In 2009, he played Romeo in the film The Boondock Saints II: All Saints Day.

Along with Jacob Vargas, Collins has appeared in several music videos for the alternative rock band Puscifer, for their songs "Toma", "Money Shot" and "Bullet Train to Iowa".

In 2010, Collins joined the cast of NBC's drama The Event as Thomas. The following year, he guested on two episodes of CSI: NY as a man named Raymond Harris, an ex-convict who seeks revenge against Mac Taylor and his partner to get some answers regarding a 17-year grudge against them. The episodes also guest-starred Peter Fonda, who Collins previously worked with in San Andreas, as Taylor's ex-partner, who ends up getting killed by Harris. In 2014, Collins portrayed a law enforcement official, Franco Rodriguez, alongside Casey Affleck, Anthony Mackie, Norman Reedus, Woody Harrelson, Kate Winslet in Triple 9.

In 2015, HBO's science fiction drama Westworld added Collins as Lawrence / El Lazo, a charming but lethal outlaw, with a knack for maneuvering and negotiating the various criminal elements.

In 2019, Collins filmed Jockey, which won the Sundance Film Festival U.S. Dramatic Special Jury Award for best acting.

== Writing ==
He wrote his first book, Prison Ramen: Recipes and Stories from Behind Bars with Gustavo "Goose" Alvarez, in 2015.

== Filmography ==
=== Film ===
Year	Title	Role	Notes
1991	Grand Canyon	Carlos' Friend	
1992	Fortress	Nino Gomez	
1993	Menace II Society	Vato	
1993	Poetic Justice	Mailroom Supervisor	
1994	The Stoned Age	Tack	
1995	Milestone	Clif	Short film
1995	Dead Presidents	Betancourt	
1995	One Tough Bastard	Jarhead	
1996	Sgt. Bilko	Soldier	
1997	One Eight Seven	Cesar Sanchez	
1997	The Bad Pack	Townsman	
1998	The Replacement Killers	Loco	
1998	The Wonderful Ice Cream Suit	Martinez	
1999	Mascara		
1999	Light It Up	Robert "Rivers" Tresmont	
1999	My Sweet Killer	Horton	
1999	Mi Abuela		Short film
2000	Price of Glory	Jimmy Ortega	
2000	Tigerland	Private Miter	
2000	Traffic	Francisco "Frankie Flowers" Flores	
2001	The Last Castle	Corporal Ramon Aguilar	
2002	Road Dogz	Raymo Serrano	
2002	Hip, Edgy, Sexy, Cool		
2002	The Rules of Attraction	Rupert	
2002	American Girl	Buddy	
2003	I Witness	Claudio Castillo	
2004	Mindhunters	Vince Sherman	
2005	Capote	Perry Edward Smith	
2005	Dirty	Officer Armando Sancho	
2005	Life of the Party	Kipp	
2006	Rampage: The Hillside Strangler Murders	Kenneth Bianchi	
2006	Babel	Officer At Border Crossing	
2006	Little Chenier	"T-Boy" Trahan	
2006	National Lampoon's TV: The Movie	Tijuana Cop #1 / Minion / Miranda	
2008	Sunshine Cleaning	Winston	
2008	Under Still Waters	Jacob	
2009	Horsemen	"Stingray"	
2009	The Perfect Game	Cesar Faz	
2009	Star Trek	Ayel	
2009	Crank: High Voltage	Jesus "El Huron" Verona	
2009	Extract	"Step"	
2009	The Boondock Saints II: All Saints Day	Romeo	
2009	Brothers	Major Cavazos	
2009	Tom Cool	Tom Picasso	
2010	Tell-Tale	Detective	Short film
2010	The Experiment	Nix	
2010	Scott Pilgrim vs. the World	Vegan Police	
2011	The FP	C.C. Jam	
2011	Machine Gun Justice	Jack Grizzly	Short film
2012	Potus	Pimp	Short film
2012	Gotten	Gun Dealer	Short film
2012	Hellbenders	Lawrence	
2012	Abraham Lincoln Vampire Hunter: The Great Calamity	Edgar Allan Poe (voice)	Short film
2012	Freeloaders	Vic	
2013	Parker	Ross	
2013	Pacific Rim	Ops Tendo Choi	
2014	Transcendence	Martin	
2015	Knight of Cups	Jordan	
2015	Stung	Sydney Perch	
2015	Man Down	Charles	
2016	Triple 9	Detective Franco Rodriguez	
2016	Transpecos	Hobbs	
2016	Punching Henry	Dramatic Actor	
2016	Hacker	Zed	
2017	Small Town Crime	Mood	
2017	M.F.A.	Kennedy	
2017	A Crooked Somebody	Nathan	
2017	The Vault	Detective Iger	
2017	Cabeza Madre	John	
2018	Super Troopers 2	Bus Driver	
2018	The Mule	Gustavo	
2019	Honey Boy	Tom	
2019	Once Upon a Time in Hollywood	Ernesto "The Mexican" Vaquero	
2019	Waves	Bobby	
2019	Running with the Devil	The Farmer	
2019	Lucky Day	DPO Ernesto Sanchez	
2021	Breaking News in Yuba County	Ray	
2021	Jockey	Jackson Silva	
2021	After Yang	George	
2021	Nightmare Alley	Funhouse Jack	
2021	Painted Beauty	Peter	
2023	Red, White & Royal Blue	Senator Oscar Diaz	
2024	The Bricklayer	Radek	
2025	By Design	Jacob the Stalker	
2025	Train Dreams	Boomer	
2025	Eddington	Lodge	
TBA	Red, White & Royal Wedding	Senator Oscar Diaz	Post-production

=== Television ===
Year	Title	Role	Notes
1990	Freddy's Nightmares	Mickey	Episode: "Interior Loft"
1990	The Flash	Javier O'Hara	Episode: "Double Vision"
1991	Adam-12	Kid in Class	Episode: "D.A.R.E."
1991	Veronica Clare	Latino Manager	Episode: "Slow Violence"
1991	Jake and the Fatman	Roberto	Episode: "Street of Dreams"
1992	For Richer, for Poorer	Co-Worker	TV movie
1993	Acapulco H.E.A.T.	David Kern	Episode: "Code Name: Desert Dragon"
1993	Sworn to Vengeance		TV movie
1994	Witch Hunt	Tyrone	TV movie
1995	Madman of the People	Jorge	Episode: "Notes from the Underground"
1995	Live Shot	Carlos Sandoval	Episode: "For Whom the Stinkin' Bell Tolls"
1996	Walker, Texas Ranger	Fito	Episode: "El Coyote: Part 1 & 2"
1996	Land's End		Episode: "Red Cadillac"
1997	Crisis Center	Nando Taylor	Main cast
1997	ER	Mr. Brown	Episode: "Tribes"
1997	NYPD Blue	Jimmy Cortez	Episode: "I Love Lucy"
1998	Diagnosis: Murder	Boyd Harcourt	Episode: "Rear Windows '98"
1998	The Defenders: Taking the First	Nelson Rodriguez	TV movie
1999	Martial Law		Episode: "Friendly Skies"
2000–2001	Resurrection Blvd.	James Garcia	Recurring cast: season 1
2002	The Twilight Zone	Andy Perez	Episode: "Last Lap"
2003	Alias	Javiar Parez	Recurring cast: season 3
2003	Undefeated	Loco	TV movie
2005	Bounty Hunters	Mouse	TV movie
2006	Thief	Jack "Bump" Hill	Main cast
2007	The Shield	Hernan	Episode: "Haunts" & "Exiled"
2007	Masters of Science Fiction	Frendon Blythe	Episode: "Little Brother"
2008	Fear Itself	Richard "Family Man" Brautigan	Episode: "Family Man"
2010	Southland	Detective Ray Suarez	Episode: "The Runner"
2010–2011	The Event	Thomas	Main cast
2011	CSI: NY	Raymond Harris	Episode: "Nothing for Something" & "Life Sentence"
2011	Pound Puppies	Scar/Weasel (voice)	Episode: "Rebel Without a Collar"
2013	Red Widow	James Ramos	Main cast
2013	Cleaners	Julian	Main cast: season 1
2013	The Blacklist	Hector Lorca	Episode: "The Stewmaker (No. 161)"
2015–2017	Ballers	Maximo Gomez	Recurring cast: seasons 1-3
2016–2020	Westworld	Lawrence/"El Lazo"	Main cast: seasons 1–2, guest: season 3
2019	Veronica Mars	Alonzo Lozano	Main cast: season 4
2021	The Stand	Bobby Terry	Episode: "The Vigil"
2025	The Last Frontier	Isaac 'Ike' Romero	Main Cast: season 1
2026	Lucky	Harris "Dutch" Ocampo	Recurring
2026	The Lowdown	Johnny (Samantha's boyfriend)	Season 2
TBA	The Murder of JonBenét Ramsey	Thomas Trujillo	Upcoming series

=== Video games ===
Year	Title	Voice role	Notes
2004	Grand Theft Auto: San Andreas	Cesar Vialpando	
2021	Grand Theft Auto: The Trilogy – The Definitive Edition	Cesar Vialpando	Archival recordings Remaster of Grand Theft Auto: San Andreas only

== Awards and honors ==
Institution	Year	Category	Work	Outcome
ALMA Awards	2002	Outstanding Supporting Actor in a Television Series	The Last Castle	Nominated
ALMA Awards	2006	Outstanding Actor in a Television Series	Capote	Nominated
ALMA Awards	2009	Outstanding Actor in Film	Star Trek, Crank: High Voltage	Nominated
Boston Society of Film Critics Awards	2010	Best Cast	Star Trek	Won
Imagen Award	2011	Best Supporting Actor – Television	The Event	Nominated
Independent Spirit Awards	2021	Best Male Lead	Jockey	Nominated
Satellite Award	2022	Best Actor in a Motion Picture	Jockey	Nominated
Screen Actors Guild Awards	2001	Outstanding Performance by a Cast in a Motion Picture	Traffic	Won
Screen Actors Guild Awards	2006	Outstanding Performance by a Cast in a Motion Picture	Capote	Nominated
Sundance Film Festival	2021	Dramatic Special Jury Award: Best Actor	Jockey	Won
Primetime Emmy Awards	2006	Outstanding Supporting Actor in a Miniseries or a Movie	Thief	Nominated
Phoenix Film Festival	2007	Best Cast	Little Chenier	Won

In 2019, Collins was awarded an Impact Award by the National Hispanic Media Coalition for Outstanding Performance in Film and Television. On October 29, 2021, he received the Distinguished Performance Award at the SCAD Savannah Film Festival.
