= Actor Award for Outstanding Performance by a Female Actor in a Comedy Series =

American award for acting in television

Actor Award for Best Actress in a Comedy Series
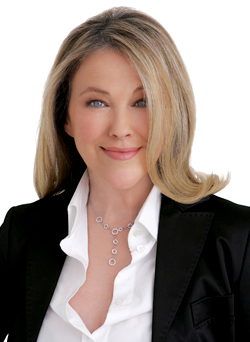
- The 2025 recipient: Catherine O'Hara
- Awarded for: Outstanding Performance by a Female Actor in a Comedy Series
- Location: Los Angeles, California
- Presented by: SAG-AFTRA
- Currently held by: Catherine O'Hara for The Studio (2025)
- Website: sagawards.org

The Actor Award for Outstanding Performance by a Female Actor in a Comedy Series is an award given by the Screen Actors Guild to honor the finest female acting achievement in a comedy series. Actresses are eligible for the award whether they appear in leading or supporting roles in their respective programs.

Julia Louis-Dreyfus holds the record for both the most wins (5) and nominations (12). She won twice for playing Elaine Benes in Seinfeld (1996, 1997) and thrice for playing Selina Meyer in Veep (2013, 2016, 2017). Tina Fey has earned four wins for her role as Liz Lemon in 30 Rock. Actresses who received seven nominations include Edie Falco, Tina Fey and Megan Mullally.

== Winners and nominees ==
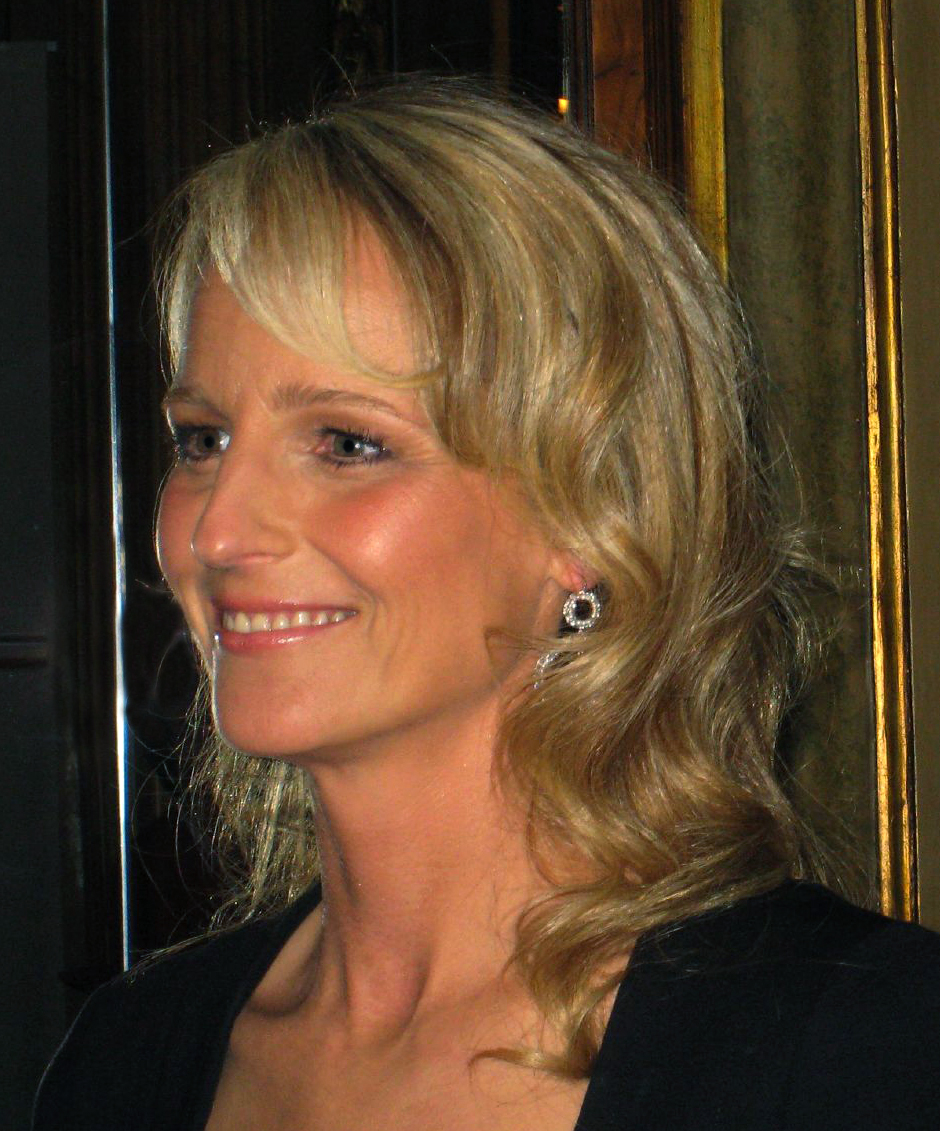
Helen Hunt won for Mad About You (1994)

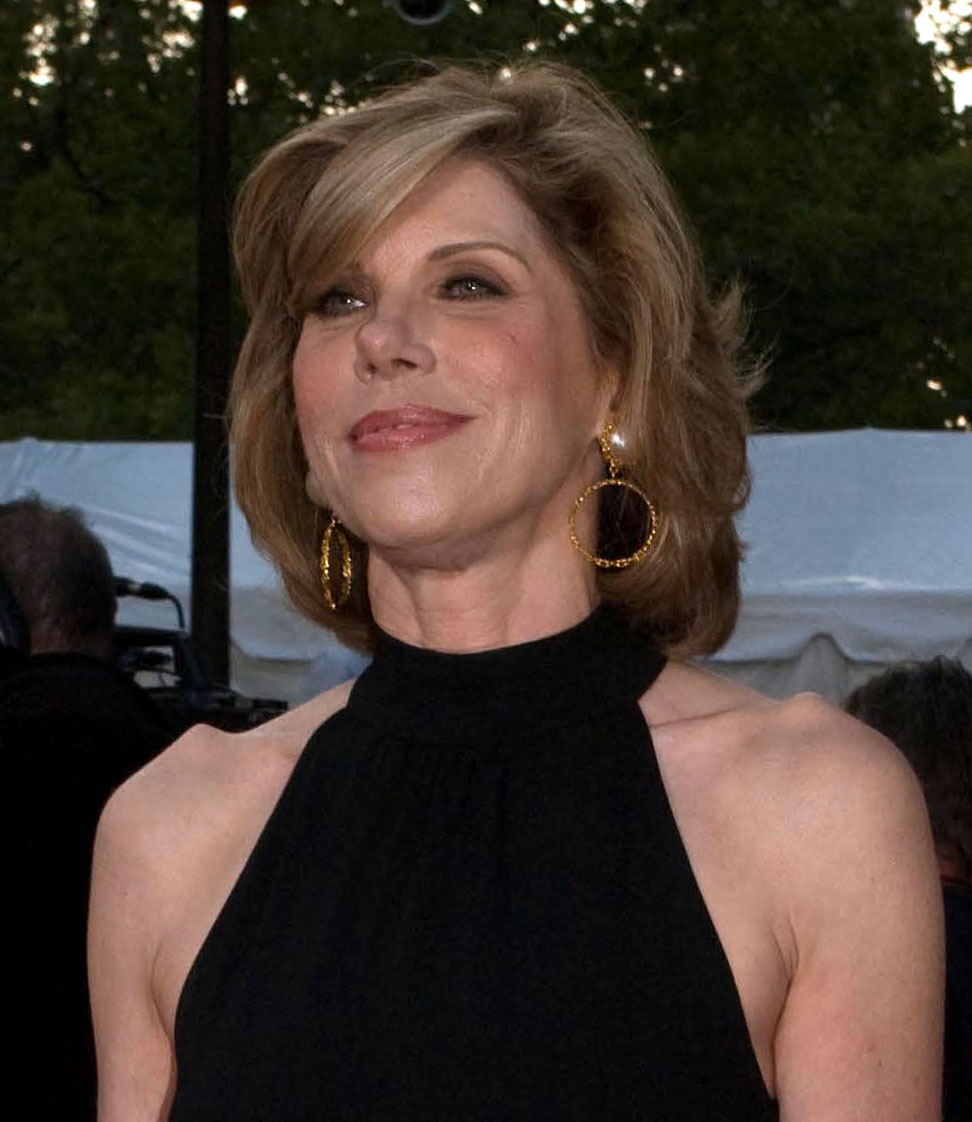
Christine Baranski won for Cybill (1995)

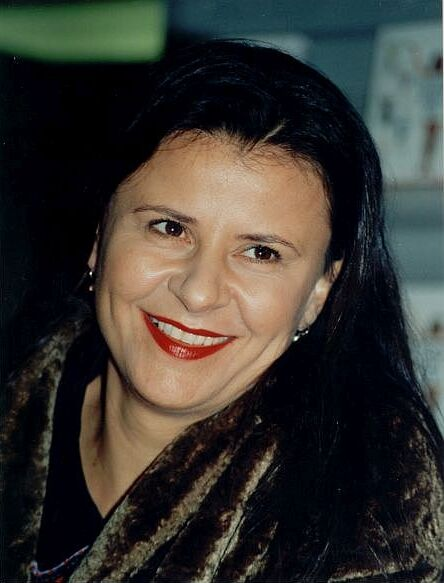
Tracey Ullman won for Tracey Takes On... (1998)

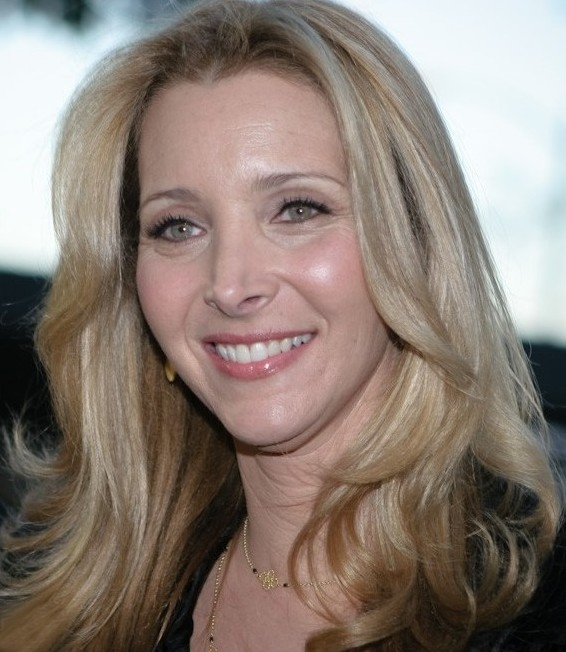
Lisa Kudrow won playing Phoebe Buffay in Friends (1999)

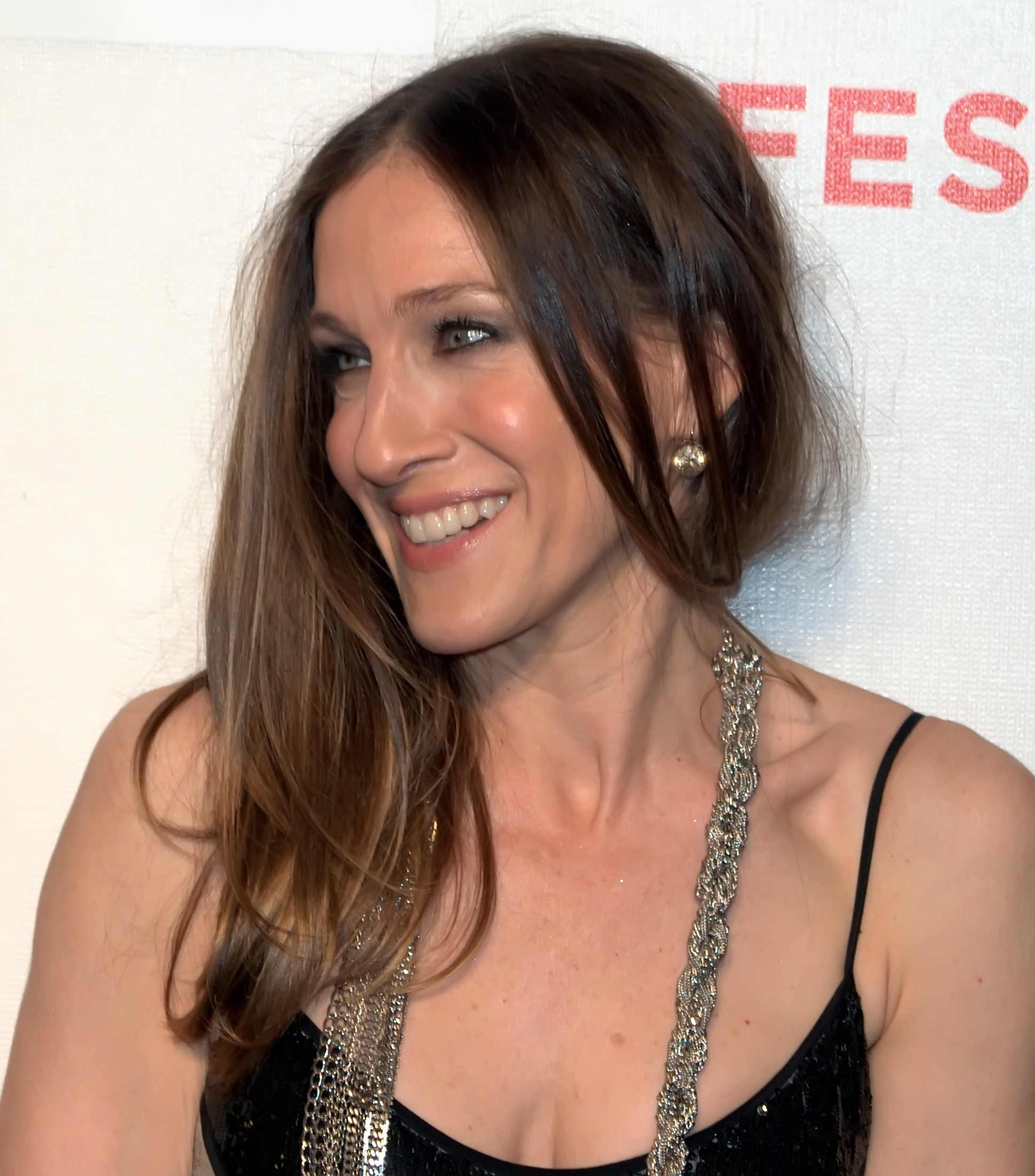
Sarah Jessica Parker won for Sex and the City (2000)

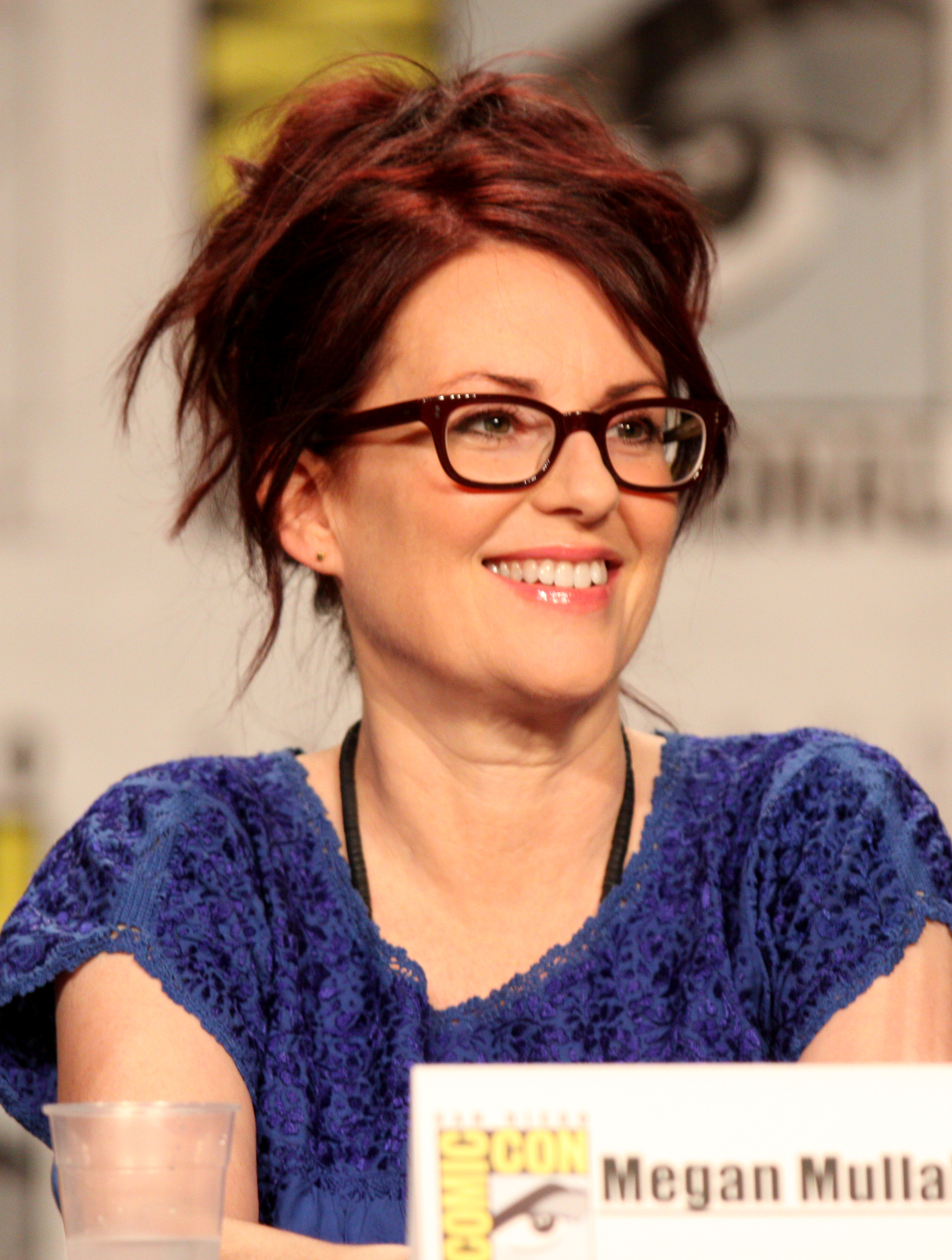
Megan Mullally won thrice for Will & Grace (2001–2003)

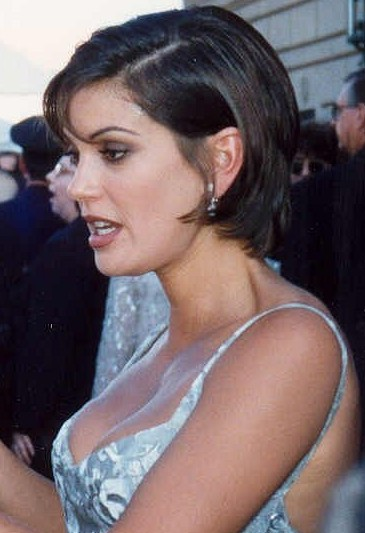
Teri Hatcher won for Desperate Housewives (2004)

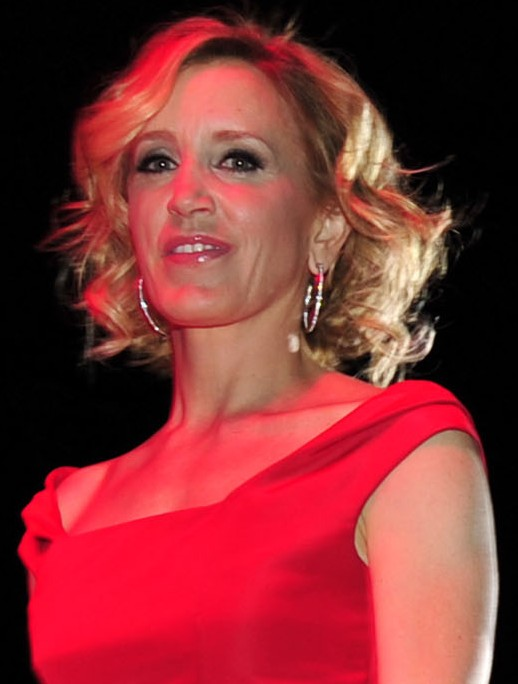
Felicity Huffman won for Desperate Housewives (2005)

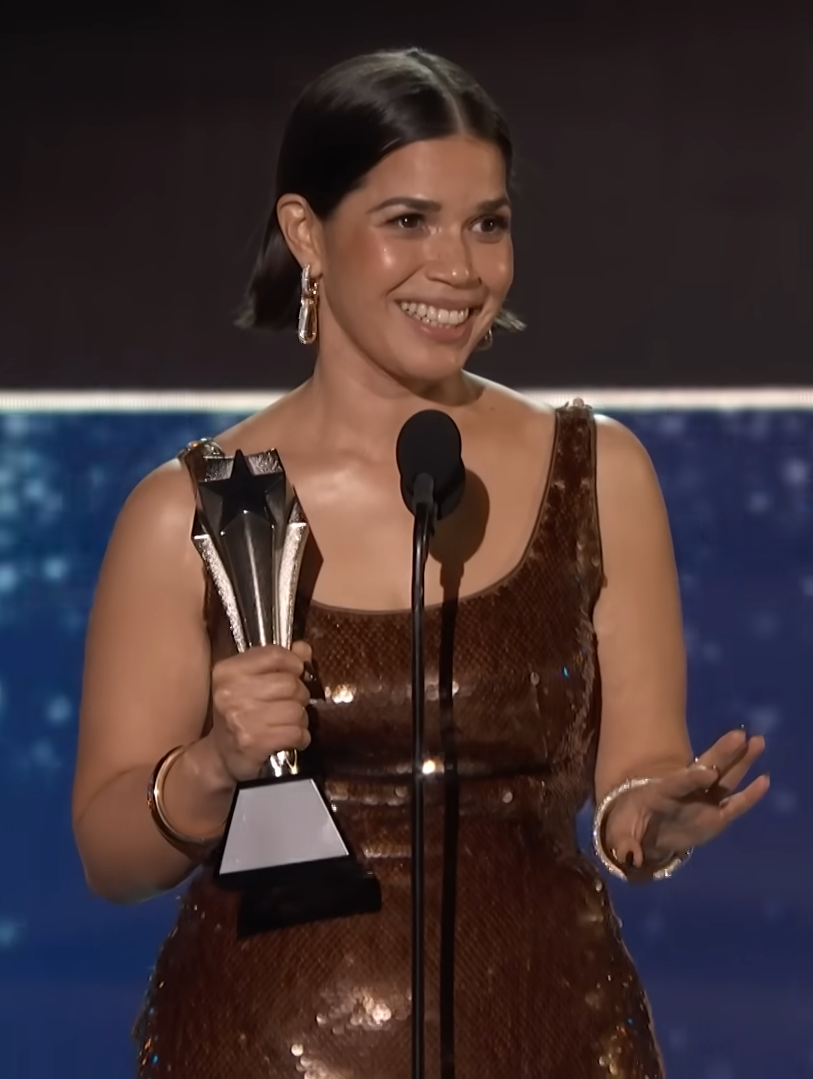
America Ferrera won for Ugly Betty (2006)

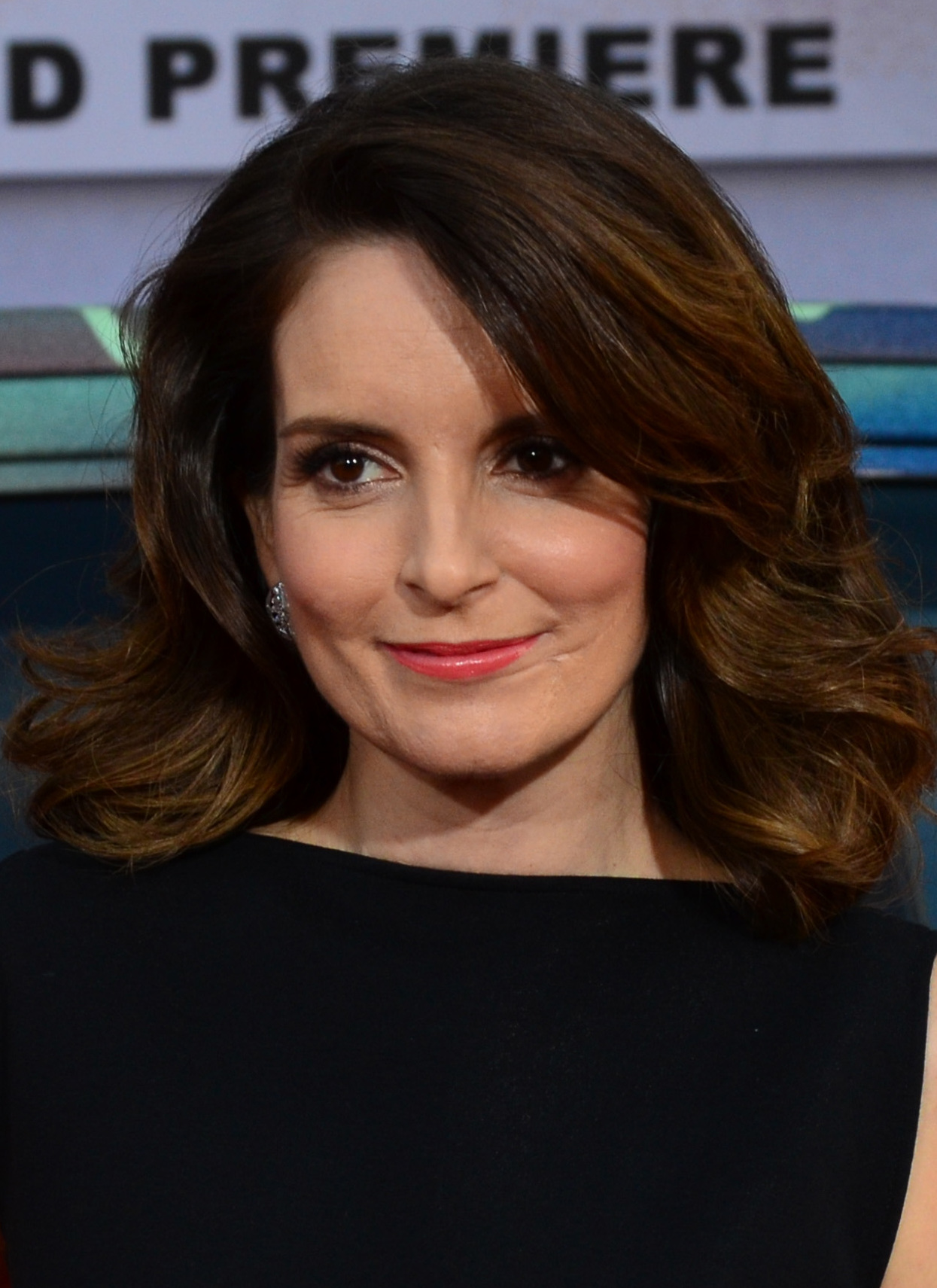
Tina Fey won four times playing Liz Lemon in 30 Rock (2007–2009, 2012)

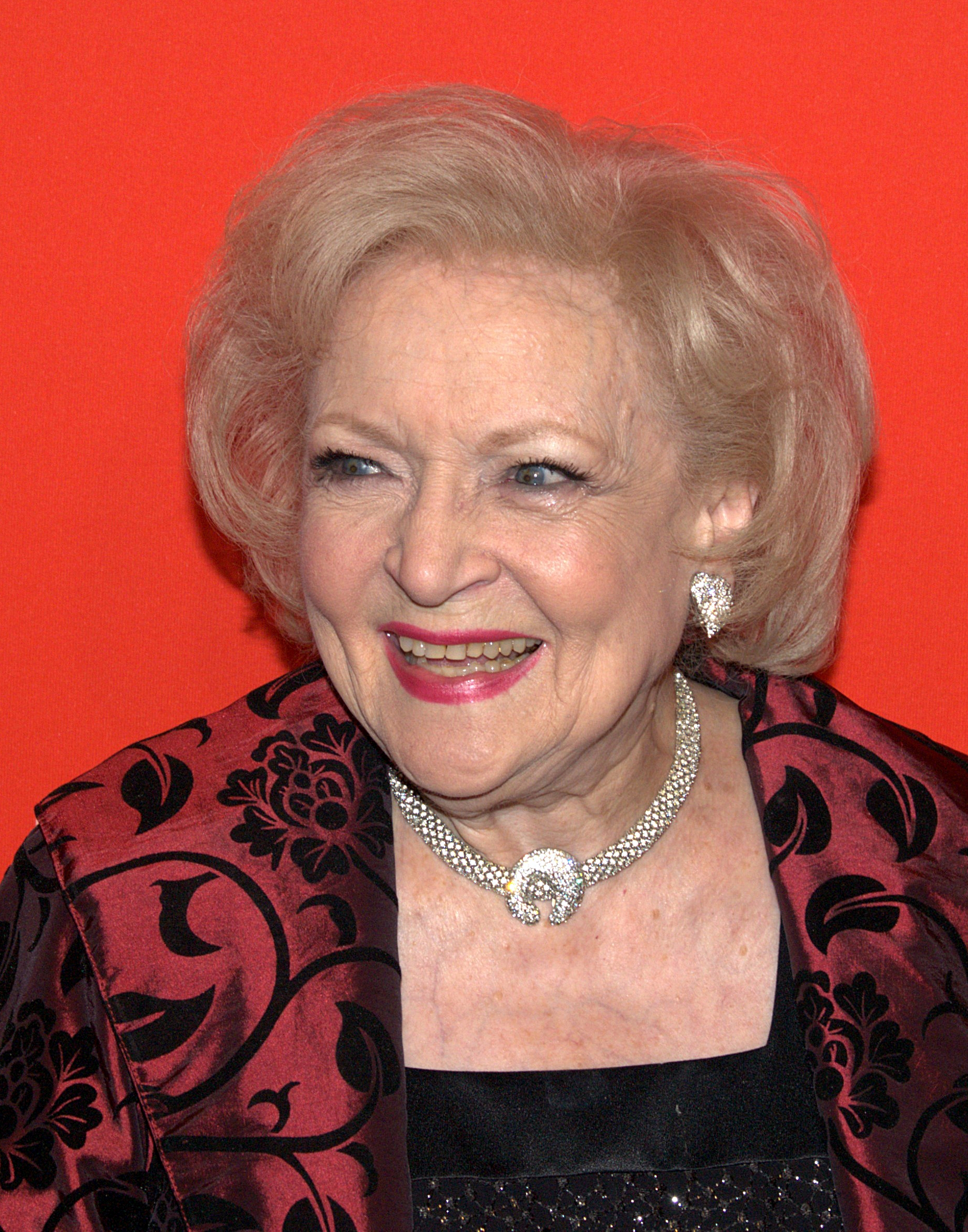
Betty White won twice for Hot in Cleveland (2010, 2011)

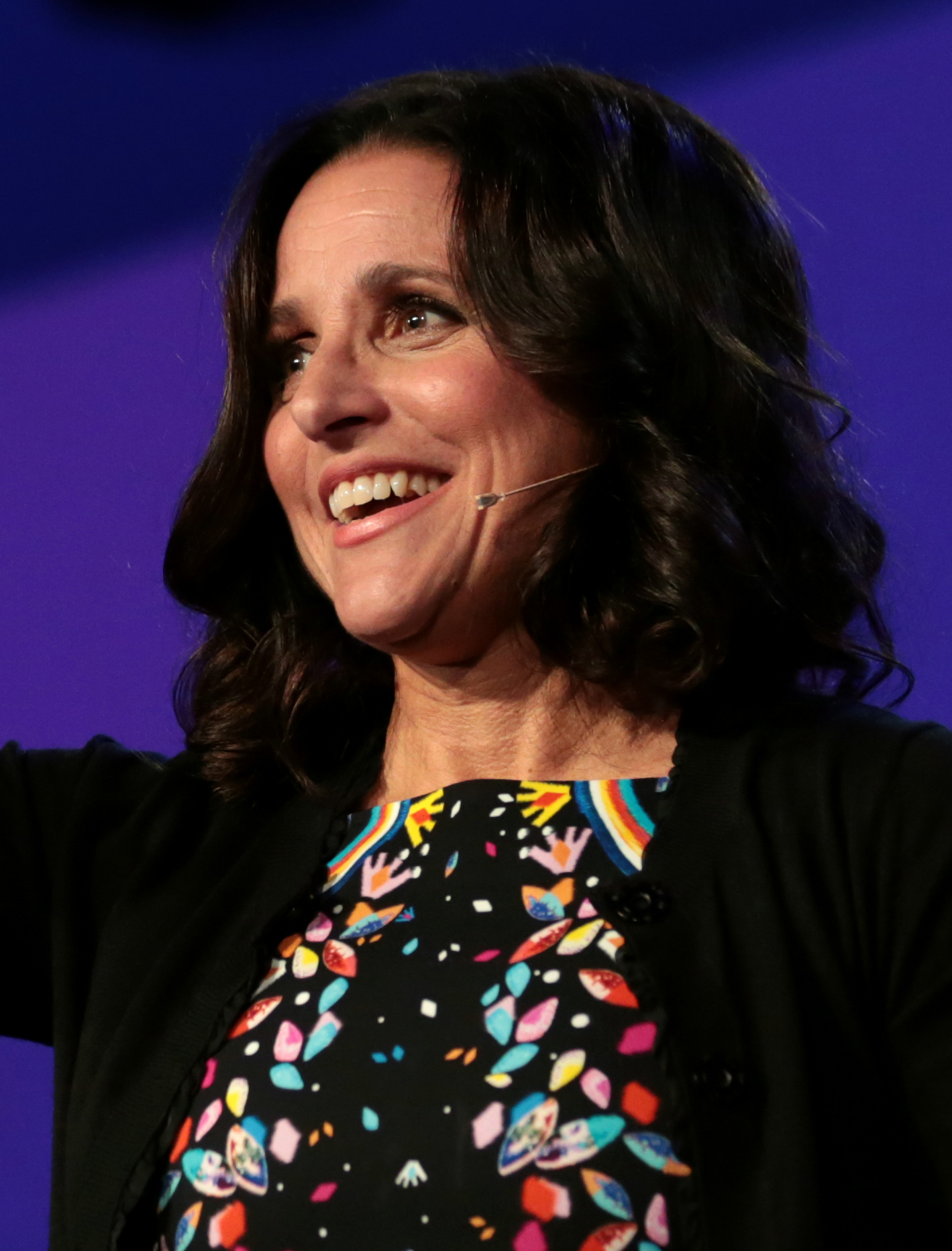
Julia Louis-Dreyfus won five times, twice for Elaine Benes in Seinfeld (1996, 1997), and thrice for Selina Meyer in Veep (2013, 2016–2017)

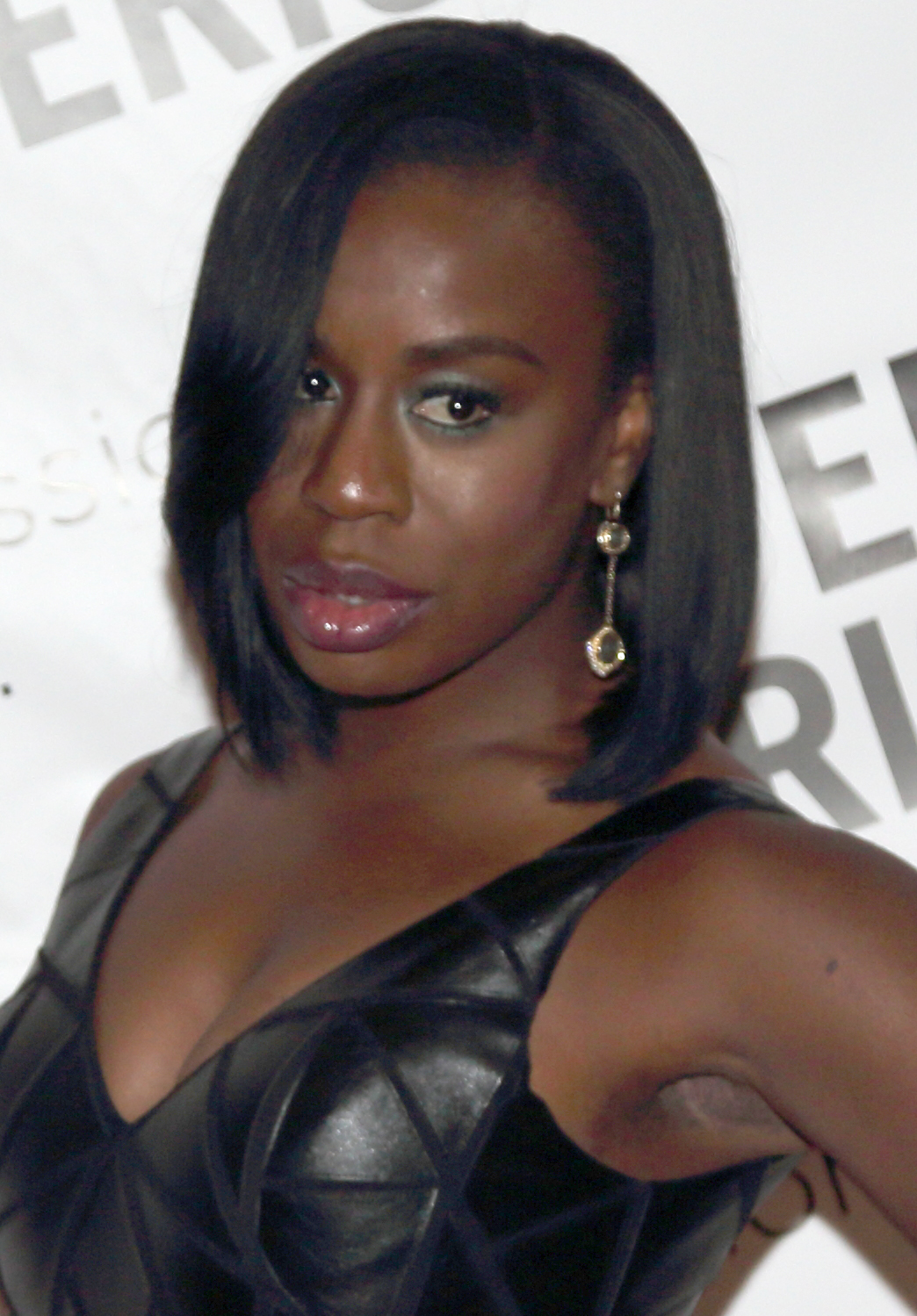
Uzo Aduba won twice for Orange is the New Black (2014–2015)

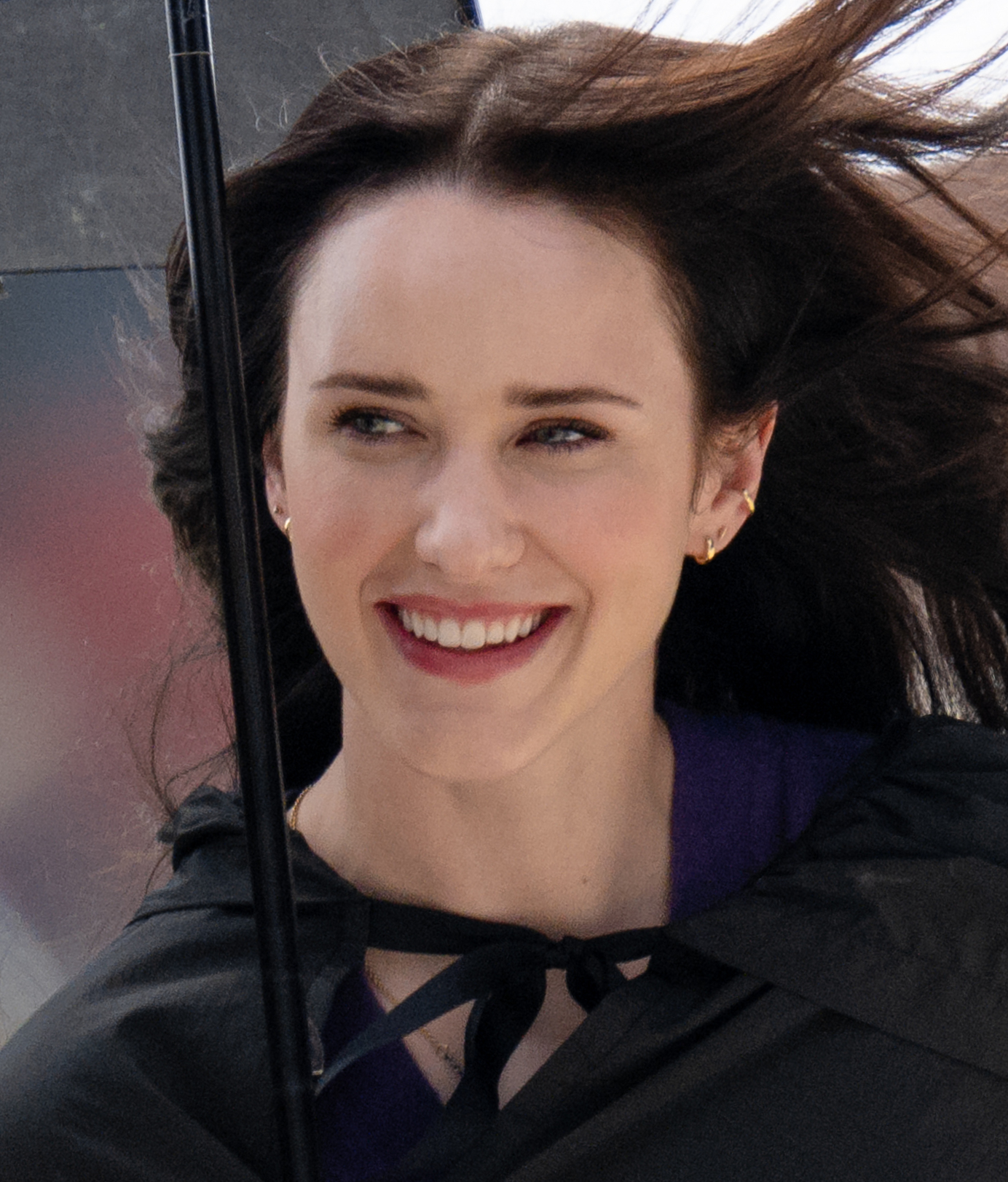
Rachel Brosnahan won for The Marvelous Mrs. Maisel (2018)

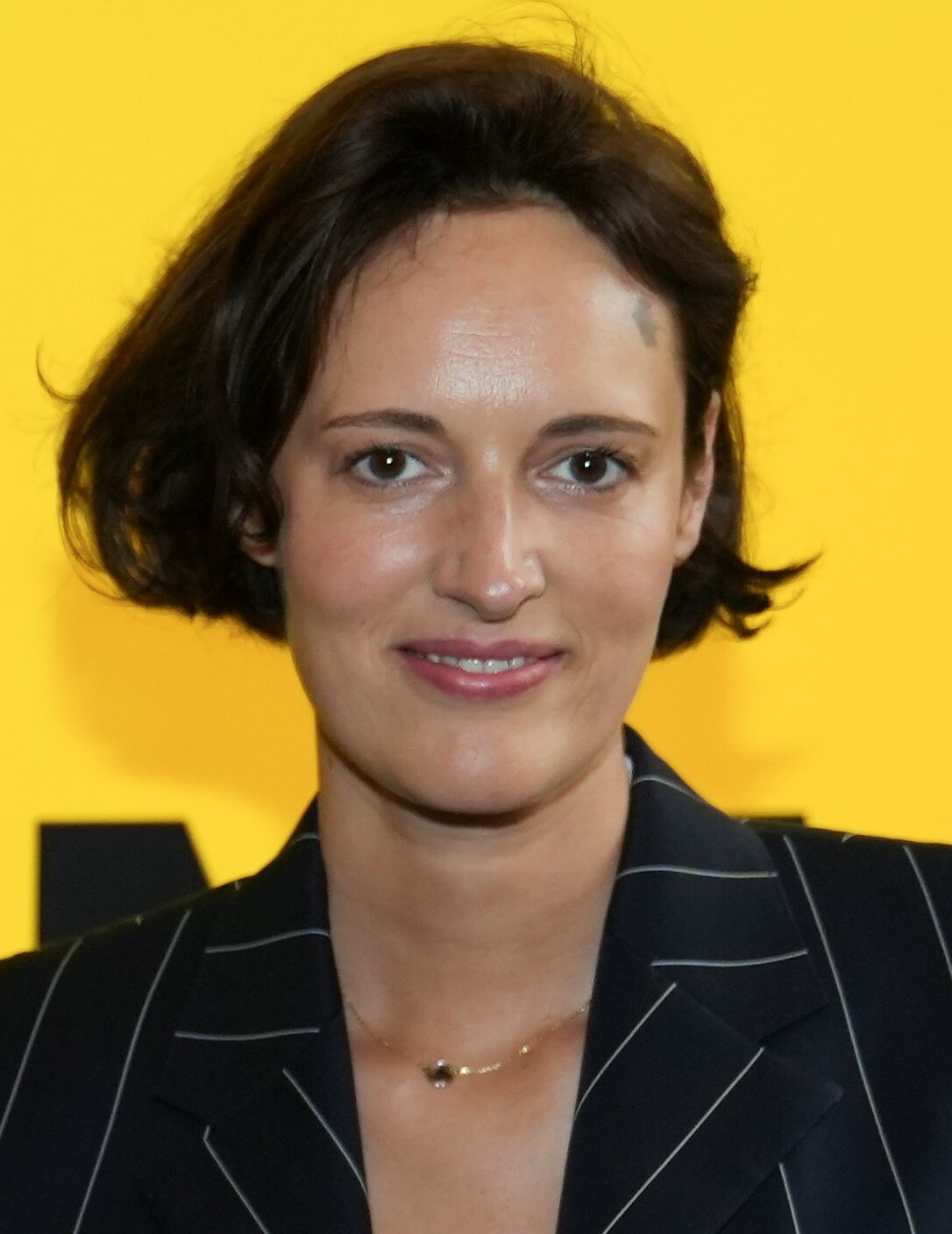
Phoebe Waller-Bridge won for Fleabag (2019)

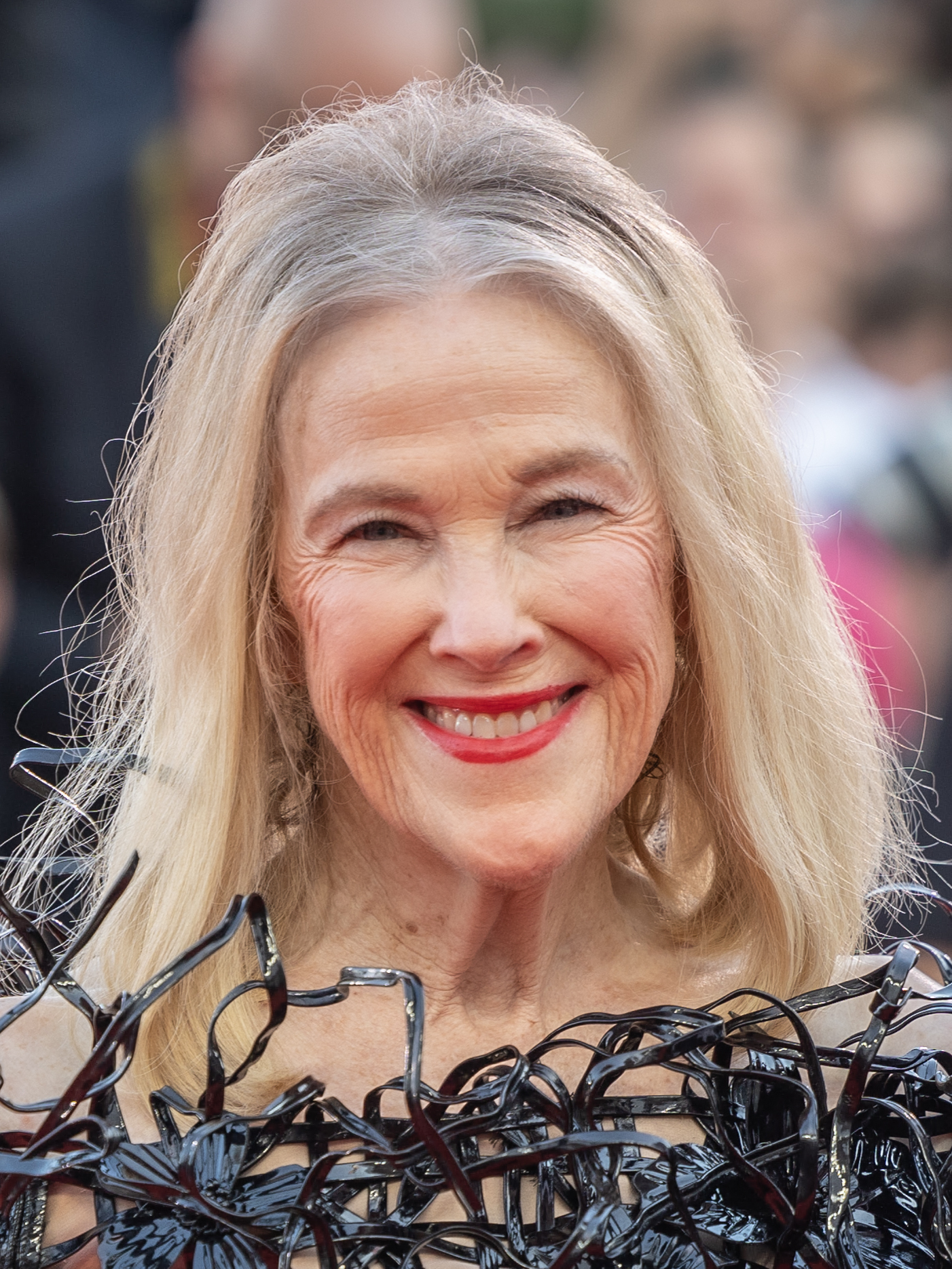
Catherine O'Hara won twice, with one each for Schitt's Creek (2020) and The Studio (2025)

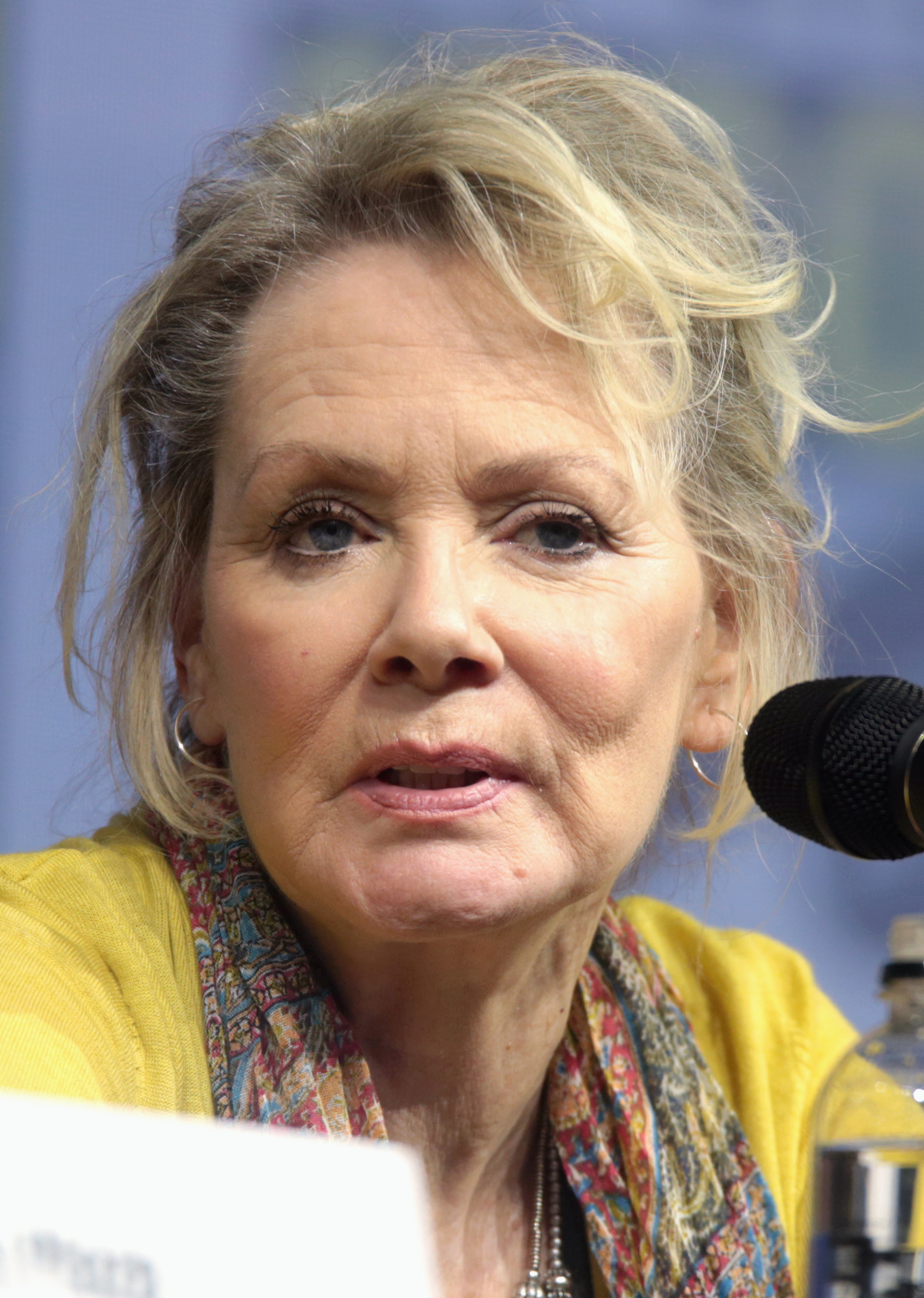
Jean Smart won thrice for Hacks (2021–2022, 2024)

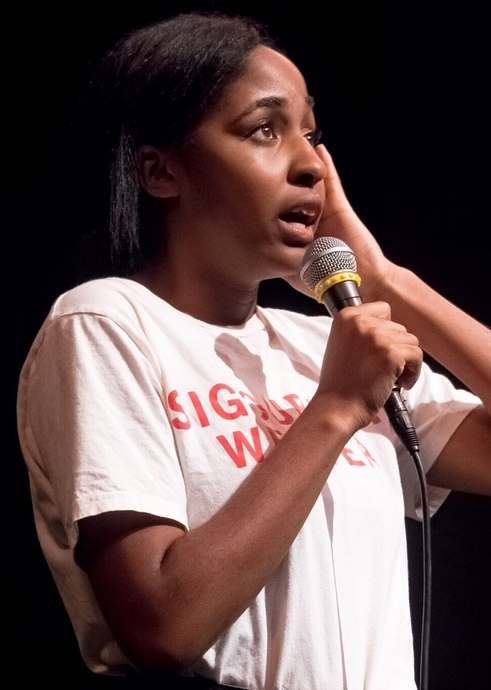
Ayo Edebiri won for The Bear (2023)

=== 1990s ===
Year	Actress	Film	Role(s)	Ref.
1994 (1st)	Helen Hunt	Mad About You	Jamie Buchman	
1994 (1st)	Roseanne Barr	Roseanne	Roseanne Conner	
1994 (1st)	Candice Bergen	Murphy Brown	Murphy Brown	
1994 (1st)	Ellen DeGeneres	Ellen	Ellen Morgan	
1994 (1st)	Julia Louis-Dreyfus	Seinfeld	Elaine Benes	
1995 (2nd)	Christine Baranski	Cybill	Maryann Thorpe	
1995 (2nd)	Candice Bergen	Murphy Brown	Murphy Brown	
1995 (2nd)	Helen Hunt	Mad About You	Jamie Buchman	
1995 (2nd)	Lisa Kudrow	Friends	Phoebe Buffay	
1995 (2nd)	Julia Louis-Dreyfus	Seinfeld	Elaine Benes	
1996 (3rd)	Julia Louis-Dreyfus	Seinfeld	Elaine Benes	
1996 (3rd)	Christine Baranski	Cybill	Maryann Thorpe	
1996 (3rd)	Ellen DeGeneres	Ellen	Ellen Morgan	
1996 (3rd)	Helen Hunt	Mad About You	Jamie Buchman	
1996 (3rd)	Kristen Johnston	3rd Rock from the Sun	Sally Solomon	
1997 (4th)	Julia Louis-Dreyfus	Seinfeld	Elaine Benes	
1997 (4th)	Kirstie Alley	Veronica's Closet	Veronica Chase	
1997 (4th)	Ellen DeGeneres	Ellen	Ellen Morgan	
1997 (4th)	Calista Flockhart	Ally McBeal	Ally McBeal	
1997 (4th)	Helen Hunt	Mad About You	Jamie Buchman	
1998 (5th)	Tracey Ullman	Tracey Takes On...	Various Characters	
1998 (5th)	Calista Flockhart	Ally McBeal	Ally McBeal	
1998 (5th)	Lisa Kudrow	Friends	Phoebe Buffay	
1998 (5th)	Julia Louis-Dreyfus	Seinfeld	Elaine Benes	
1998 (5th)	Amy Pietz	Caroline in the City	Annie Spadaro	
1999 (6th)	Lisa Kudrow	Friends	Phoebe Buffay	
1999 (6th)	Calista Flockhart	Ally McBeal	Ally McBeal	
1999 (6th)	Lucy Liu	Ally McBeal	Ling Woo	
1999 (6th)	Sarah Jessica Parker	Sex and the City	Carrie Bradshaw	
1999 (6th)	Tracey Ullman	Tracey Takes On...	Various Characters	

=== 2000s ===
Year	Actress	Film	Role(s)	Ref.
2000 (7th)	Sarah Jessica Parker	Sex and the City	Carrie Bradshaw	
2000 (7th)	Calista Flockhart	Ally McBeal	Ally McBeal	
2000 (7th)	Jane Kaczmarek	Malcolm in the Middle	Lois	
2000 (7th)	Debra Messing	Will & Grace	Grace Adler	
2000 (7th)	Megan Mullally	Will & Grace	Karen Walker	
2001 (8th)	Megan Mullally	Will & Grace	Karen Walker	
2001 (8th)	Jennifer Aniston	Friends	Rachel Green	
2001 (8th)	Kim Cattrall	Sex and the City	Samantha Jones	
2001 (8th)	Patricia Heaton	Everybody Loves Raymond	Debra Barone	
2001 (8th)	Sarah Jessica Parker	Sex and the City	Carrie Bradshaw	
2002 (9th)	Megan Mullally	Will & Grace	Karen Walker	
2002 (9th)	Jennifer Aniston	Friends	Rachel Green	
2002 (9th)	Kim Cattrall	Sex and the City	Samantha Jones	
2002 (9th)	Patricia Heaton	Everybody Loves Raymond	Debra Barone	
2002 (9th)	Jane Kaczmarek	Malcolm in the Middle	Lois	
2003 (10th)	Megan Mullally	Will & Grace	Karen Walker	
2003 (10th)	Patricia Heaton	Everybody Loves Raymond	Debra Barone	
2003 (10th)	Lisa Kudrow	Friends	Phoebe Buffay	
2003 (10th)	Debra Messing	Will & Grace	Grace Adler	
2003 (10th)	Doris Roberts	Everybody Loves Raymond	Marie Barone	
2004 (11th)	Teri Hatcher	Desperate Housewives	Susan Mayer	
2004 (11th)	Patricia Heaton	Everybody Loves Raymond	Debra Barone	
2004 (11th)	Megan Mullally	Will & Grace	Karen Walker	
2004 (11th)	Sarah Jessica Parker	Sex and the City	Carrie Bradshaw	
2004 (11th)	Doris Roberts	Everybody Loves Raymond	Marie Barone	
2005 (12th)	Felicity Huffman	Desperate Housewives	Lynette Scavo	
2005 (12th)	Candice Bergen	Boston Legal	Shirley Schmidt	
2005 (12th)	Patricia Heaton	Everybody Loves Raymond	Debra Barone	
2005 (12th)	Megan Mullally	Will & Grace	Karen Walker	
2005 (12th)	Mary-Louise Parker	Weeds	Nancy Botwin	
2006 (13th)	America Ferrera	Ugly Betty	Betty Suarez	
2006 (13th)	Felicity Huffman	Desperate Housewives	Lynette Scavo	
2006 (13th)	Julia Louis-Dreyfus	The New Adventures of Old Christine	Christine Campbell	
2006 (13th)	Megan Mullally	Will & Grace	Karen Walker	
2006 (13th)	Mary-Louise Parker	Weeds	Nancy Botwin	
2006 (13th)	Jaime Pressly	My Name Is Earl	Joy Turner	
2007 (14th)	Tina Fey	30 Rock	Liz Lemon	
2007 (14th)	Christina Applegate	Samantha Who?	Samantha Newly	
2007 (14th)	America Ferrera	Ugly Betty	Betty Suarez	
2007 (14th)	Mary-Louise Parker	Weeds	Nancy Botwin	
2007 (14th)	Vanessa Williams	Ugly Betty	Wilhelmina Slater	
2008 (15th)	Tina Fey	30 Rock	Liz Lemon	
2008 (15th)	Christina Applegate	Samantha Who?	Samantha Newly	
2008 (15th)	America Ferrera	Ugly Betty	Betty Suarez	
2008 (15th)	Mary-Louise Parker	Weeds	Nancy Botwin	
2008 (15th)	Tracey Ullman	Tracey Ullman's State of the Union	Various Characters	
2009 (16th)	Tina Fey	30 Rock	Liz Lemon	
2009 (16th)	Christina Applegate	Samantha Who?	Samantha Newly	
2009 (16th)	Toni Collette	The United States of Tara	Tara Gregson	
2009 (16th)	Edie Falco	Nurse Jackie	Jackie Peyton	
2009 (16th)	Julia Louis-Dreyfus	The New Adventures of Old Christine	Christine Campbell	

=== 2010s ===
Year	Actress	Film	Role(s)	Ref.
2010 (17th)	Betty White	Hot in Cleveland	Elka Ostrovsky	
2010 (17th)	Edie Falco	Nurse Jackie	Jackie Peyton	
2010 (17th)	Tina Fey	30 Rock	Liz Lemon	
2010 (17th)	Jane Lynch	Glee	Sue Sylvester	
2010 (17th)	Sofía Vergara	Modern Family	Gloria Delgado-Pritchett	
2011 (18th)	Betty White	Hot in Cleveland	Elka Ostrovsky	
2011 (18th)	Julie Bowen	Modern Family	Claire Dunphy	
2011 (18th)	Edie Falco	Nurse Jackie	Jackie Peyton	
2011 (18th)	Tina Fey	30 Rock	Liz Lemon	
2011 (18th)	Sofía Vergara	Modern Family	Gloria Delgado-Pritchett	
2012 (19th)	Tina Fey	30 Rock	Liz Lemon	
2012 (19th)	Edie Falco	Nurse Jackie	Jackie Peyton	
2012 (19th)	Amy Poehler	Parks and Recreation	Leslie Knope	
2012 (19th)	Sofía Vergara	Modern Family	Gloria Delgado-Pritchett	
2012 (19th)	Betty White	Hot in Cleveland	Elka Ostrovsky	
2013 (20th)	Julia Louis-Dreyfus	Veep	Selina Meyer	
2013 (20th)	Mayim Bialik	The Big Bang Theory	Amy Farrah Fowler	
2013 (20th)	Julie Bowen	Modern Family	Claire Dunphy	
2013 (20th)	Edie Falco	Nurse Jackie	Jackie Peyton	
2013 (20th)	Tina Fey	30 Rock	Liz Lemon	
2014 (21st)	Uzo Aduba	Orange Is the New Black	Suzanne "Crazy Eyes" Warren	
2014 (21st)	Julie Bowen	Modern Family	Claire Dunphy	
2014 (21st)	Edie Falco	Nurse Jackie	Jackie Peyton	
2014 (21st)	Julia Louis-Dreyfus	Veep	Selina Meyer	
2014 (21st)	Amy Poehler	Parks and Recreation	Leslie Knope	
2015 (22nd)	Uzo Aduba	Orange Is the New Black	Suzanne "Crazy Eyes" Warren	
2015 (22nd)	Edie Falco	Nurse Jackie	Jackie Peyton	
2015 (22nd)	Ellie Kemper	Unbreakable Kimmy Schmidt	Kimmy Schmidt	
2015 (22nd)	Julia Louis-Dreyfus	Veep	Selina Meyer	
2015 (22nd)	Amy Poehler	Parks and Recreation	Leslie Knope	
2016 (23rd)	Julia Louis-Dreyfus	Veep	Selina Meyer	
2016 (23rd)	Uzo Aduba	Orange Is the New Black	Suzanne "Crazy Eyes" Warren	
2016 (23rd)	Jane Fonda	Grace and Frankie	Grace Hanson	
2016 (23rd)	Ellie Kemper	Unbreakable Kimmy Schmidt	Kimmy Schmidt	
2016 (23rd)	Lily Tomlin	Grace and Frankie	Frankie Bergstein	
2017 (24th)	Julia Louis-Dreyfus	Veep	Selina Meyer	
2017 (24th)	Uzo Aduba	Orange Is the New Black	Suzanne "Crazy Eyes" Warren	
2017 (24th)	Alison Brie	GLOW	Ruth Wilder	
2017 (24th)	Jane Fonda	Grace and Frankie	Grace Hanson	
2017 (24th)	Lily Tomlin	Grace and Frankie	Frankie Bergstein	
2018 (25th)	Rachel Brosnahan	The Marvelous Mrs. Maisel	Miriam "Midge" Maisel	
2018 (25th)	Alex Borstein	The Marvelous Mrs. Maisel	Susie Myerson	
2018 (25th)	Alison Brie	GLOW	Ruth Wilder	
2018 (25th)	Jane Fonda	Grace and Frankie	Grace Hanson	
2018 (25th)	Lily Tomlin	Grace and Frankie	Frankie Bergstein	
2019 (26th)	Phoebe Waller-Bridge	Fleabag	Fleabag	
2019 (26th)	Christina Applegate	Dead to Me	Jen Harding	
2019 (26th)	Alex Borstein	The Marvelous Mrs. Maisel	Susie Myerson	
2019 (26th)	Rachel Brosnahan	The Marvelous Mrs. Maisel	Miriam "Midge" Maisel	
2019 (26th)	Catherine O'Hara	Schitt's Creek	Moira Rose	

=== 2020s ===
Year	Actress	Film	Role(s)	Ref.
2020 (27th)	Catherine O'Hara	Schitt's Creek	Moira Rose	
2020 (27th)	Christina Applegate	Dead to Me	Jen Harding	
2020 (27th)	Linda Cardellini	Dead to Me	Judy Hale	
2020 (27th)	Kaley Cuoco	The Flight Attendant	Cassie Bowden	
2020 (27th)	Annie Murphy	Schitt's Creek	Alexis Rose	
2021 (28th)	Jean Smart	Hacks	Deborah Vance	
2021 (28th)	Elle Fanning	The Great	Catherine the Great	
2021 (28th)	Sandra Oh	The Chair	Ji-Yoon Kim	
2021 (28th)	Juno Temple	Ted Lasso	Keeley Jones	
2021 (28th)	Hannah Waddingham	Ted Lasso	Rebecca Welton	
2022 (29th)	Jean Smart	Hacks	Deborah Vance	
2022 (29th)	Christina Applegate	Dead to Me	Jen Harding	
2022 (29th)	Rachel Brosnahan	The Marvelous Mrs. Maisel	Miriam "Midge" Maisel	
2022 (29th)	Quinta Brunson	Abbott Elementary	Janine Teagues	
2022 (29th)	Jenna Ortega	Wednesday	Wednesday Addams	
2023 (30th)	Ayo Edebiri	The Bear	Sydney Adamu	
2023 (30th)	Alex Borstein	The Marvelous Mrs. Maisel	Susie Myerson	
2023 (30th)	Rachel Brosnahan	The Marvelous Mrs. Maisel	Miriam "Midge" Maisel	
2023 (30th)	Quinta Brunson	Abbott Elementary	Janine Teagues	
2023 (30th)	Hannah Waddingham	Ted Lasso	Rebecca Welton	
2024 (31st)	Jean Smart	Hacks	Deborah Vance	
2024 (31st)	Kristen Bell	Nobody Wants This	Joanne	
2024 (31st)	Quinta Brunson	Abbott Elementary	Janine Teagues	
2024 (31st)	Liza Colón-Zayas	The Bear	Tina Marrero	
2024 (31st)	Ayo Edebiri	The Bear	Sydney Adamu	
2025 (32nd)	Catherine O'Hara (posthumous)	The Studio	Patty Leigh	
2025 (32nd)	Kathryn Hahn	The Studio	Maya Mason	
2025 (32nd)	Jenna Ortega	Wednesday	Wednesday Addams	
2025 (32nd)	Jean Smart	Hacks	Deborah Vance	
2025 (32nd)	Kristen Wiig	Palm Royale	Maxine Simmons	

== Superlatives ==
Superlative	Female Actor - Drama Series		Female Actor - Comedy Series		Overall	
Actress with most awards	Julianna Margulies	4	Julia Louis-Dreyfus	5	Julia Louis-Dreyfus	5
Actress with most nominations	Julianna Margulies	9	Julia Louis-Dreyfus	12	Edie Falco	14
Actress with most nominations without ever winning	Kyra Sedgwick	7	Edie Falco	7	Kyra Sedgwick	7
Television program with most wins	The Crown	4	30 Rock	4	30 Rock / The Crown	4
Television program with most nominations	The Sopranos	12	Will & Grace	9	The Sopranos	12

== Actors with multiple awards ==
5 wins

- Julia Louis-Dreyfus

4 wins

- Tina Fey

3 wins

- Megan Mullally
- Jean Smart

2 wins

- Uzo Aduba
- Catherine O'Hara
- Betty White

== Series with multiple awards ==
4 wins

- 30 Rock (NBC)

3 wins

- Hacks (HBO Max)
- Veep (HBO)
- Will & Grace (NBC)

2 wins

- Desperate Housewives (ABC)
- Hot in Cleveland (TV Land)
- Orange Is the New Black (Netflix)
- Seinfeld (NBC)

== Actors with multiple nominations ==
12 nominations

- Julia Louis-Dreyfus

7 nominations

- Edie Falco
- Tina Fey
- Megan Mullally

6 nominations

- Christina Applegate

5 nominations

- Patricia Heaton

4 nominations

- Uzo Aduba
- Rachel Brosnahan
- Calista Flockhart
- Helen Hunt
- Lisa Kudrow
- Mary-Louise Parker
- Sarah Jessica Parker
- Jean Smart

3 nominations

- Candice Bergen
- Alex Borstein
- Julie Bowen
- Quinta Brunson
- Ellen DeGeneres
- America Ferrera
- Jane Fonda
- Catherine O'Hara
- Amy Poehler
- Lily Tomlin
- Tracey Ullman
- Sofía Vergara
- Betty White

2 nominations

- Jennifer Aniston
- Christine Baranski
- Alison Brie
- Kim Cattrall
- Ayo Edebiri
- Felicity Huffman
- Jane Kaczmarek
- Ellie Kemper
- Debra Messing
- Jenna Ortega
- Doris Roberts
- Hannah Waddingham

== Series with multiple nominations ==
9 nominations

- Will & Grace (NBC)

7 nominations

- 30 Rock (NBC)
- Everybody Loves Raymond (CBS)
- The Marvelous Mrs. Maisel (Amazon)
- Nurse Jackie (Showtime)

6 nominations

- Friends (NBC)
- Grace and Frankie (Netflix)
- Modern Family (ABC)
- Sex and the City (HBO)

5 nominations

- Ally McBeal (Fox)
- Seinfeld (NBC)
- Veep (HBO)

4 nominations

- Dead to Me (Netflix)
- Hacks (HBO Max)
- Mad About You (NBC)
- Orange Is the New Black (Netflix)
- Ugly Betty (ABC)
- Weeds (Showtime)

3 nominations

- Abbott Elementary (ABC)
- The Bear (FX)
- Desperate Housewives (ABC)
- Ellen (ABC)
- Hot in Cleveland (TV Land)
- Parks and Recreation (NBC)
- Samantha Who? (ABC)
- Schitt's Creek (PopTV)
- Ted Lasso (Apple TV)

2 nominations

- Cybill (CBS)
- GLOW (Netflix)
- Malcolm in the Middle (Fox)
- Murphy Brown (CBS)
- The New Adventures of Old Christine (CBS)
- The Studio (Apple TV)
- Tracey Takes On... (HBO)
- Unbreakable Kimmy Schmidt (Netflix)
- Wednesday (Netflix)

== See also ==
- Primetime Emmy Award for Outstanding Lead Actress in a Comedy Series
- Primetime Emmy Award for Outstanding Supporting Actress in a Comedy Series
- Golden Globe Award for Best Actress – Television Series Musical or Comedy
