= Christopher Matthew Cook =

American actor

- Occupation: Actor
- Years active: 2011–present
- Known for: Hours (2013); Dog Eat Dog (2016)

Christopher Matthew Cook is an American actor who portrayed Licari in Season 5 of AMC's The Walking Dead. He is also known for Dog Eat Dog, Renfield, and Hours.

== Filmography ==
=== Movies ===
Year	Title	Role
2013	Flying Monkeys	Matt Cook
2013	2 Guns	Papi's Men - Thick
2013	Paradise	Security Guard
2013	The Starving Games	Guard
2013	Hours	Lenny
2016	Mr. Right	Garrety
2016	Dog Eat Dog	Diesel
2016	Billy Lynn's Long Halftime Walk	Roadie Foreman
2017	An American in Texas	Sgt. Elton Bryant
2018	Regarding the Case of Joan of Arc	Calhoun
2019	The Drone	Richie
2023	Renfield	Bob
2023	Fast Charlie	Lloyd "The Freak" Mercury
2024	Beverly Hills Cop: Axel F	Officer Reid
2024	The Bunker	The Handler

=== Television ===
Year	Title	Role	Notes
2011	Treme	Officer Kerry Clayton	1 episode
2012	Breakout Kings	Rick	1 episode
2012	Common Law	Catcher's Mask	1 episode
2013	Revolution	Militia	Uncredited; 1 episode
2013	Mob City	Huey	1 episode
2014	Star-Crossed	Atrian Captain	1 episode
2014	Reckless	Blake Stayne	2 episodes
2014	NCIS: New Orleans	Oscar Randolph	1 episode
2014	Under the Dome	Rick	1 episode
2014	The Walking Dead	Licari	2 episodes
2014	Legends	Billy	1 episode
2015	Zoo	Sergeant	1 episode
2019	S.W.A.T.	Maddox	Episode: "Cash Flow"
2019	Just Roll with It	Mr. Nice Guy	1 episode
2022	Pam & Tommy	Tino	2 episodes
2022	Young Rock	George "The Animal" Steele	2 episodes
2025	High Potential	SWAT Captain Cliff Halloway	1 episode
2025	Georgie & Mandy's First Marriage	Doug	1 episode
2025	Fallout	Bill	1 episode
2026	The Hawk	Zev	4 episodes
