= List of Samantha Who? characters =

From left to right: Dena (Melissa McCarthy), Howard Newly (Kevin Dunn), Regina Newly (Jean Smart), Samantha Newly (Christina Applegate), Todd Deepler (Barry Watson), Andrea Belladonna (Jennifer Esposito), Frank (Tim Russ).

The following is a list of characters in the ABC comedy television series Samantha Who?.

== Primary characters ==
Character	Actor/ Actress	Description
Samantha "Sam" Newly	Christina Applegate	A hit-and-run accident leaves Samantha in a coma for eight days; when she wakes up she has retrograde amnesia. As the series progresses, Sam begins to remember bits and pieces of her lost memory but she still needs her friends and family to remind her of key events in her life that she has forgotten. She worked as a Vice President at a Chicago realtor's firm. She quit her job in the episode "The Butterflies".
Todd Deepler	Barry Watson	Todd Deepler is Samantha's Canadian ex-boyfriend. Todd lived with Samantha before they broke up and still lives in her apartment (while she lives with her parents). Todd is a freelance photographer who sells pictures to newspapers and also holds gallery exhibits. Samantha and Todd have an on and off relationship throughout the series.
Regina Newly	Jean Smart	Regina is Samantha's mother who wants to have a healthy relationship with her daughter but prior to her coma they hadn't spoken to each other for two years. She, like Samantha, has a 'bad' side, and has commented that the 'bad' side improves in every generation (episode "The Car").
Andrea Belladonna	Jennifer Esposito	Andrea is Samantha's best friend and co-worker. She's a materialistic party girl and wishes Samantha would go back to who she was before the accident. Regina thinks Andrea is a bad influence on Sam, and regularly chastises her for being a drunk. She is also an attorney. In the past, Samantha was very rude to her as she suddenly recalls. She is engaged to basketball player Tony Dane in order to keep his sexuality out of the tabloids. Among Sam's friends, Andrea acts as her shoulder devil.
Dena	Melissa McCarthy	Dena is Samantha's socially awkward childhood best friend whom Samantha hasn't seen since seventh grade. When Samantha wakes up from her coma she convinces Samantha that they have always been best friends. While Andrea eventually forces her to reveal the truth, Samantha still remains friends with her. She lives with her two dogs. Among Sam's friends, Dena acts as her shoulder angel.
Howard Newly	Kevin Dunn	Howard is Samantha's dad, who works as a chicken farmer; he's happy that he has his daughter back and loves to go hunting.
Frank	Tim Russ	Frank is the doorman at Samantha's building. He is often sarcastic towards Samantha. It's eventually revealed that he is married and has a daughter.

== Recurring characters ==
Character	Actor / Actress	Description	Duration
Chase Chapman	Rick Hoffman	Chase Chapman is Samantha's business-minded former boss who co-owns Chapman and Funk. He is also Dena's boyfriend.	1-2
Winston Funk	Timothy Olyphant (Season 1); Billy Zane (Season 2)	Winston Funk is the co-owner of Chapman and Funk. He is Samantha's former boss and despite previously being involved with and proposing to Samantha, he is still interested in pursuing a romantic relationship with her. (The role was recast in the second season because Timothy Olyphant was unavailable to reprise his character.)	1-2
Seth Barber	Stephen Rannazzisi	Seth is a friend of Todd's. He has feelings for Andrea even though she rejects him.	2
Tony Dane	McKinley Freeman	Tony Dane is a basketball player who Andrea is engaged to. The engagement was concocted by his agents in order to keep his homosexuality out of the tabloids.	2

=== Former main/recurring characters ===
Character	Actor/ Actress	Description	Seasons
Owen	James Tupper	Owen was Samantha's boyfriend and they met when he buys a building from Samantha. He is a hardcore environmentalist and a vegan. Like Sam, he is still friends with his ex (Willow).	2
Kevin Eisling	Eddie Cibrian	Kevin Eisling was Samantha's hockey-loving ex-boyfriend. He was the first person she had dated since her amnesia.	1
Chloë	Kiele Sanchez	Chloë is Todd's third ex-girlfriend. She is depicted as emotional and possessive. After Todd dumped her secretly for Samantha, Chloë went to Samantha for comfort.	1
Willow	Eliza Coupe	Willow is Owen's ex-girlfriend. She formerly worked as a model and was Todd's classmate in art school.	2
Tracy	Joy Osmanski	Tracy was Samantha's assistant. She is often intimidated by Samantha, due to Samantha's treatment of her in the past.	1
