= Kevin Dunn =

American actor (born 1956)

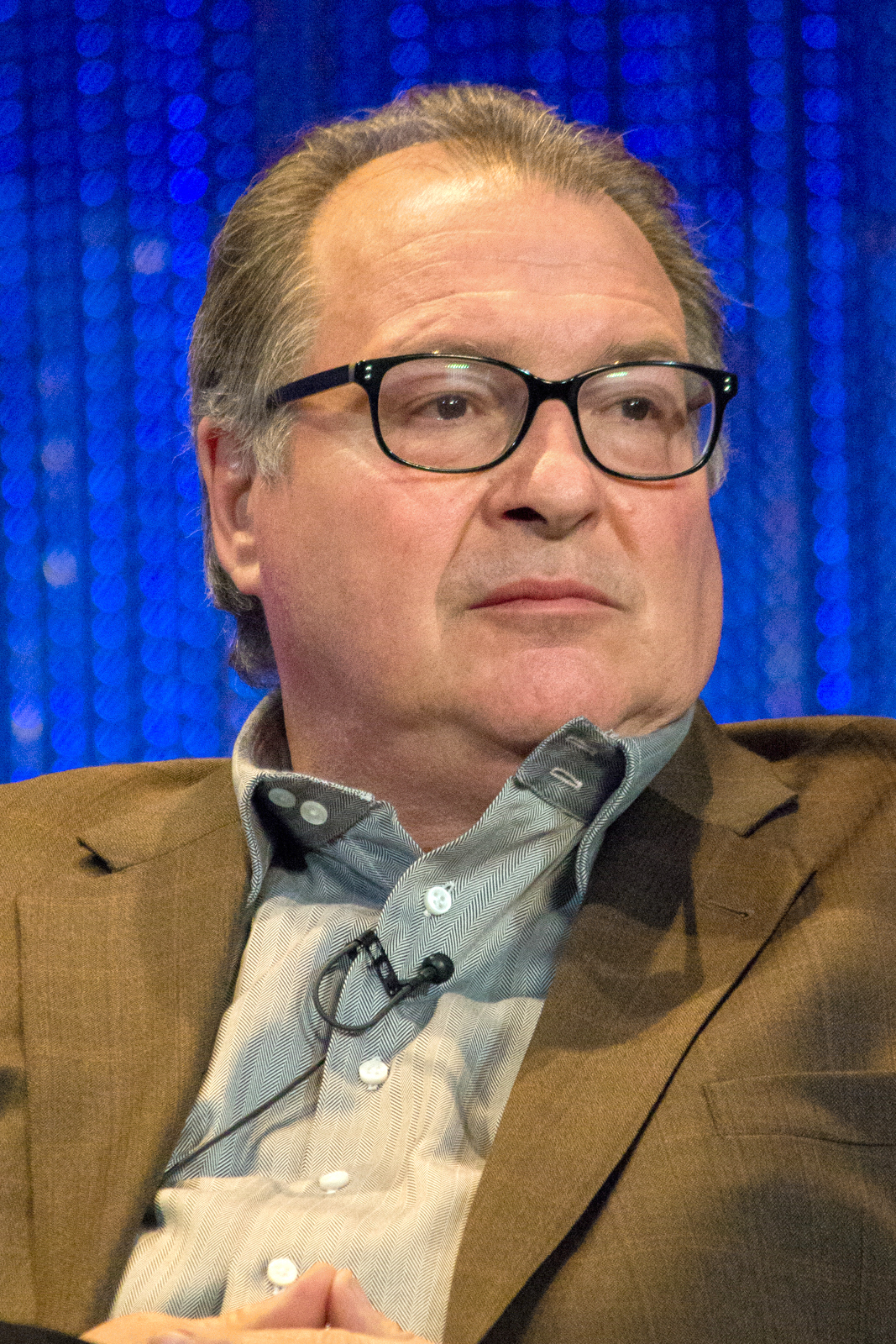
- Dunn in 2014
- Born: August 24, 1956 (age 70); Chicago, Illinois, U.S.
- Education: Illinois Wesleyan University
- Occupation: Actor
- Years active: 1986–present
- Spouse: Katina Alexander (m. 1986)
- Children: 1
- Relatives: Nora Dunn (sister)

Kevin Dunn (born August 24, 1956) is an American actor who has appeared in supporting roles in numerous films and television series since the 1980s.

Dunn's roles include White House Communications Director Alan Reed in the political comedy Dave (1993), U.S. Army Colonel Hicks in the 1998 version of Godzilla, a role he reprised for the animated TV adaptation Godzilla: The Series (1998–2000), Alan Abernathy's father Stuart in Small Soldiers (1998), Sam Witwicky's father Ron in the Transformers film series, Oscar Galvin in the 2010 action thriller Unstoppable and misanthropic White House Chief of Staff Ben Cafferty in Veep. He has also had recurring roles on True Detective in 2014 and on the TV series adaptation of The Mosquito Coast in 2021.

== Early life and education ==
Dunn was born on August 24, 1956, in Chicago, Illinois, the son of John Dunn, a musician and poet, and his wife Margaret (née East), a nurse. His sister is actress/comedian Nora Dunn (born 1952). He also has a brother, Michael Dunn, a high school history teacher and football coach. He was raised in a Catholic family, and has Irish, English, Scottish, and German ancestry. Dunn graduated from Illinois Wesleyan University in 1977, and received an honorary doctorate in 2008 from the same school.

== Career ==
Dunn appeared in many live performances in Chicago and its suburbs, including the theater companies Northlight, Remains, Wisdom Bridge and Goodman before his TV and motion picture career. Dunn's work includes Samantha Who?, a series appearing on ABC from 2007 to 2009, as well as playing Ron Witwicky in Michael Bay's Transformers film series. His film appearances include Ghostbusters II (1989), Hot Shots! (1991), 1492: Conquest of Paradise (1992), Dave (1993), Beethoven's 2nd (1993), Nixon (1995), Mad Love (1995), Small Soldiers (1998), Godzilla (1998), Snake Eyes (1998), and Stir of Echoes (1999). Dunn also played Murry Wilson in a 2000 miniseries, The Beach Boys: An American Family. He played President Richard Nixon's White House Counsel, Charles Colson, in Nixon and played President Bill Clinton's National Security Advisor, Sandy Berger, in the ABC miniseries The Path to 9/11. In 2000, he co-starred in Bette, a sitcom starring Bette Midler, in which he played her husband in the show's first 11 episodes. From 2004 to 2006, Dunn had a small recurring role as Terry Hardwick, a baseball coach and mentor to Tyler Hoechlin character Martin Brewer, on the long-running family drama 7th Heaven.

Dunn played Joel Horneck, Jerry's overzealous childhood friend, in the Seinfeld episode "Male Unbonding". He has also featured in Live Free or Die as well as the 2006 film Gridiron Gang.

Dunn is an executive producer of the award-winning documentary film Kumpanía: Flamenco Los Angeles (2011).

Dunn played the role of White House Chief of Staff Ben Cafferty in HBO's late 2010s political comedy Veep.

== Personal life ==
Dunn and his wife, Katina Alexander, married in 1986 and they have a son.

== Filmography ==
=== Film ===
Year	Title	Role	Notes
1988	Mississippi Burning	FBI Agent Bird	
1989	Ghostbusters II	Milton Angland	Uncredited
1990	Blue Steel	Assistant Chief Stanley Hoyt	
1990	Marked for Death	FBI Agent Sal Roselli	
1990	The Bonfire of the Vanities	Tom Killian	
1991	Only the Lonely	Patrick Muldoon	
1991	Hot Shots!	Lieutenant Commander Block	
1992	1492: Conquest of Paradise	Captain Mendez	
1992	Chaplin	FBI Director J. Edgar Hoover	
1993	Dave	Alan Reed	
1993	Beethoven's 2nd	Brillo, Missy's Owner	Uncredited
1994	Little Big League	Arthur Goslin	
1995	Mad Love	Clifford Leland	
1995	Nixon	Charles Colson	
1996	Chain Reaction	FBI Agent Doyle	
1997	The 6th Man	Mikulski	
1997	Picture Perfect	Mr. Mercer	
1998	Godzilla	Colonel Anthony Hicks	
1998	Almost Heroes	Hidalgo	
1998	Small Soldiers	Stuart Abernathy	
1998	Snake Eyes	Lou Logan, Reporter	
1999	Stir of Echoes	Frank McCarthy	
2002	Confessions	Unknown	Short film
2004	I Heart Huckabees	Marty	
2006	The Darwin Awards	Insurance Executive	
2006	Live Free or Die	Chief Monson	
2006	The Black Dahlia	Cleo A. Short, Elizabeth Short's Father	Uncredited
2006	Gridiron Gang	Ted Dexter	
2006	All the King's Men	Alex	
2007	Transformers	Ron Witwicky	
2007	Lions for Lambs	Howard, ANX Editor	
2008	Vicky Cristina Barcelona	Mark	
2009	Transformers: Revenge of the Fallen	Ron Witwicky	
2010	Unstoppable	Oscar Galvin	
2011	You May Not Kiss the Bride	Agent Ross	
2011	Transformers: Dark of the Moon	Ron Witwicky	
2011	Warrior	Principal Joe Zito	
2011	Kumpania: Flamenco Los Angeles	—N/a	Documentary; Executive producer
2012	Fire with Fire	Agent Calvin Mullens	
2013	Jobs	Dr. Gil Amelio	
2013	The Frozen Ground	Lieutenant Bob Jent	
2014	Cesar Chavez	Dr. Arlo	Uncredited
2014	Draft Day	Marvin	
2015	Ashby	Coach Bruton	
2015	Slow Learners	Darren Lowry	
2016	Keeping Up with the Joneses	Carl Pronger	
2017	The Bachelors	Paul Abernac	
2018	Trading Paint	"Stumpy"	
2019	Captive State	Police Chief Igoe	
2019	Standing Up, Falling Down	Gary Rollins	
2019	Above Suspicion	Bob Singer	
2021	Thunder Force	Frank	
2021	Catch the Fair One	Willie	
2021	King Richard	Vic Braden	
2025	Mermaid	Keith	
2026	72 Hours	Terry	

=== Television ===
Year	Title	Role	Notes
1986	Jack and Mike	Anthony Kubecek	2 episodes
1987	Night of Courage	Policeman	Television movie
1987	Cheers	Jim McNulty	Episode: "The Last Angry Mailman"
1988	Beverly Hills Buntz	Rinaldo de Martino	Episode: "Brief Encounter"
1988	Day by Day	Mel Schrom	Recurring role (5 episodes)
1988	Sunny Spoon	Unknown	Episode: "Papa Rozzi"
1988	Family Ties	Bob	Episode: "The Boys Next Door"
1989	21 Jump Street	Reed Bowman	Episode: "The Blu Flu"
1988–1989	L.A. Law	Barry Braunstein	2 episodes
1989	Family Ties	Glen	Episode: "All in the Neighborhood (Part 1)"
1989	Gideon Oliver	Jacob Waldner	Episode: "Kennonite"
1989	Roseanne	Burt Drucker	Episode: "Somebody Stole My Gal"
1989	Taken Away	Lombardi	Television movie
1990	Seinfeld	Joel	Episode: "Male Unbonding"
1990	Sydney	Jake	Episode: "Jake"
1990	Dear John	Bob Morris	Episode: "A Priest's Story"
1990	Blind Faith	Lieutenant Gladston	Miniseries; 2 episodes
1992	Double Edge	Webber	Television movie
1995	The Four Diamonds	Charles Millard / Charles The Mysterious	Television movie
1995	JAG	Rear Admiral Al Brovo	Episode: "A New Life"
1995	Jack Reed: One of Our Own	Phil Brenner	Television movie
1995	Shadow of a Doubt	Mark Evola	Television movie
1996	Jack Reed: A Killer Among Us	Phil Brenner	Television movie
1996	Unforgivable	Milton "Milt" Stella	Television movie
1996	Shattered Mind	Eric	Television movie
1997	The Second Civil War	Jimmy Cannon	Television movie
1997	Arsenio	Al	Recurring role (6 episodes)
1997	On the Edge of Innocence	Dr. Barbico	Television movie
1998–2000	Godzilla	Major Anthony Hicks (voice)	Series regular (20 episodes)
1999	The First Gentleman	The First Gentleman	Television movie
1999	Batman Beyond	Dr. Howard Hodges (voice)	Episode: "Heroes"
2000	The Beach Boys: An American Family	Murry Wilson	Miniseries; 2 episodes
2000	God, the Devil and Bob	(voice)	Recurring role (3 episodes)
2000–2001	Bette	Roy	Recurring role (12 episodes)
2002	The Practice	Bill Munce	Episode: "Man and Superman"
2002	Gleason	Jack Philbin	Television movie
2002	Push, Nevada	Mitch Mann	2 episodes
2002	Boomtown	Ron Berman	Episode: "The David McNorris Show"
2003	Ann Rule Presents: The Stranger Beside Me	Dick Reed	Television movie
2003	Dragnet	J.J. Halsted	Episode: "Let's Make a Deal"
2003	L.A. County 187	Lieutenant Bob Coughlan	Television movie
2003	Boston Public	Ed "Big Ed"	Episode: "Chapter Seventy-Five"
2004	NTSB: The Crash of Flight 323	Cyrus	Television movie
2004	LAX	Vic Tilden	Episode: "Out of Control"
2004	Huff	Berkowitz	Episode: "Control"
2004	NYPD 2069	Joe Banning	Television movie
2005	Law & Order	Arnie MacLaren	Episode: "Publish and Perish"
2005	Marsha Potter Gets a Life	Unknown	Television movie
2004–2006	7th Heaven	Coach Terry Hardwick	Recurring role (4 episodes)
2006	Lost	Gordy	Episode: "The Long Con"
2006	Law & Order: Criminal Intent	Detective Carson Laird	Episode: "The Good"
2006	The Closer	Mar. Catalina	Episode: "Head Over Heels"
2006	The Path to 9/11	Samuel "Sandy" Berger	Miniseries; 2 episodes
2006	A Perfect Day	Darren	Television movie
2006	The Mikes	Unknown	Television movie
2006–2007	Boston Legal	Attorney Jonathan Weiner	2 episodes
2007	Prison Break	Cooper Green	2 episodes
2007–2009	Samantha Who?	Howard	Series regular (35 episodes)
2010–2011	Scooby-Doo! Mystery Incorporated	Various Characters (voice)	Recurring role (3 episodes)
2011	Harry's Law	District Attorney George Kupcheck	Episode: "Send in the Clowns"
2011–2012	Luck	Marcus Becker	Series regular (9 episodes)
2013	Prosecuting Casey Anthony	George Anthony	Television movie
2013–2019	Veep	Ben Cafferty	Main role (54 episodes)
2014	True Detective	Major Ken Quesada	Recurring role (5 episodes)
2015–2016	Code Black	Dr. Taylor	Recurring role (9 episodes)
2016	American Dad!	Councilman (voice)	Episode: "Roots"
2016	The Night Of	Daniel Lang	Television miniseries Episode: "The Beach"
2018	Ghosted	Mervyn "Merv" Minette	Recurring role (5 episodes)
2019	Documentary Now!	Rob Seger	Episode: "Any Given Saturday Afternoon"
2019	City on a Hill	District Attorney Nathan Rey	6 episodes
2019	Suits	George Richardson	Episode: "Whatever It Takes"
2019	Constance	Unknown	Television movie
2020	Miracle Workers	Uncle Bert	Episode: "Dark Ages: Holiday"
2020	Mom	Gary	Episode: "Smitten Kitten and a Tiny Boo-Boo Error"
2021	The Mosquito Coast	Margot's Dad	Episode: "Light Out"
2022	God's Favorite Idiot	Gene	Main role
2022	A League of Their Own	Morris Baker	2 episodes
2023	Law & Order	Defense Attorney Keith Hollins	Episodes: "Battle Lines" & "Deadline"
2025	Ballard	Gary Pearlman	

Preceded by Chris Latta	Voice of and portrayed Sparkplug Witwicky; 2007–2009	Succeeded by incumbent
