= Hours (2013 film) =

2013 film by Eric Heisserer

- Theatrical release poster
- Directed by: Eric Heisserer
- Written by: Eric Heisserer
- Produced by: Peter Safran
- Starring: Paul Walker; Genesis Rodriguez; T. J. Hassan; Shane Jacobsen; Judd Lormand
- Cinematography: Jaron Presant
- Edited by: Sam Bauer
- Music by: Benjamin Wallfisch
- Production companies: The Safran Company; Laguna Ridge Pictures; PalmStar Entertainment
- Distributed by: Pantelion Films
- Release dates: March 10, 2013 (SXSW); December 13, 2013 (United States)
- Running time: 97 minutes
- Country: United States
- Language: English
- Budget: $4.6 million
- Box office: $1.7 million

Hours is a 2013 American thriller film directed and written by Eric Heisserer. The film stars Paul Walker, Genesis Rodriguez, T. J. Hassan, and Judd Lormand, and follows a father who struggles to keep his newborn infant daughter alive after the electricity cuts off in the wake of Hurricane Katrina. The film premiered on March 10, 2013 at the South by Southwest Film Festival in the Topfer Theatre in Austin, Texas. It went on general release on December 13, 2013, two weeks after Paul Walker's death on November 30, 2013.

== Plot ==
In 2005, Nolan Hayes rushes his wife Abigail to a New Orleans hospital as she is in labor five weeks early. She dies in childbirth and leaves behind a newborn girl, who must be kept in a ventilator for the next two days before she can breathe on her own. As Hurricane Katrina approaches, the hospital is evacuated, and Nolan is left alone with his daughter (whom he names Abigail, after her mother) because the ventilator cannot be transported. In his search for food, Nolan encounters a cook on his way to a nearby hospital unaffected by the hurricane and receives change for the vending machines and some sausage. After a nurse promises to bring back help, the flooding of the basement causes a power outage, prompting Nolan to search for a generator for the ventilator battery. The generator he finds must be hand-cranked every three minutes, and with each charge the battery life gets shorter, making Nolan's every action an increasingly tight race against time.

Nolan discovers a rescue dog tangled in rope and frees it, naming it Sherlock and feeding it his sausage. Nolan hears helicopters flying overhead and goes to the roof to signal one, but it is repelled by criminals shooting at it. He then finds an ambulance parked outside and tries to call for help using the radio, but only receives an automated announcement. Nolan searches for a spare battery, but has no luck. He does find a generator in a flooded basement room, but it is ruined from immersion and almost electrocutes him. He is barely in time to charge the battery again. Despite being awake for over 36 hours, running low on food, and having cut his hand from cranking the generator, he continues to come up with clever ways to charge the battery (e.g. using his foot and later a rod).

Looters break into the hospital and steal food, drugs and saline water needed for the baby. One comes in Nolan's room and tries to steal food, but gets run off by Sherlock. Nolan later realizes that this man had robbed and killed the nurse who was bringing back supplies. Since Nolan has not slept in almost two days, he takes a shot of adrenaline to keep himself awake. Two more looters break in, looking for drugs. Nolan overpowers one of them, takes his gun and shoots the other. After 40 hours, the crank of the charger finally breaks, and the exhausted Nolan gives Abigail mouth-to-mouth resuscitation to keep her alive, but passes out from shock, stress, and exhaustion. He then hears the ventilator beeping; it is running out of power, but he is too weak to get up and accepts that he has failed his child. Sherlock brings two paramedics, who start to wheel Nolan out on a stretcher. When Abigail starts crying, the paramedics hand Nolan his baby.

== Cast ==
- Paul Walker as Nolan Hayes
- Genesis Rodriguez as Abigail Hayes
- T. J. Hassan as Jeremy
- Shane Jacobsen as Marc
- Judd Lormand as Glenn
- Nancy Nave as Sandra
- Michelle Torres as Hurricane Katrina victim
- Kerry Cahill as Nurse Shelly
- Yohance Myles as Dr. Edmonds
- Natalia Safran as Karen
- Elton LeBlanc as Paramedic
- Tony Bentley as Doctor
- Emily D. Haley as Patient
- Christopher Matthew Cook as Lenny
- Cynthia LeBlanc as Head Nurse
- Lena Clark as Lucy

== Reception ==
On Rotten Tomatoes, a review aggregator, the film holds an approval rating of 64% with an average rating of 5.2/10, based on 33 reviews. On Metacritic, the film has a weighted average score of 55 out of 100, based on 16 critics, indicating "mixed or average" reviews.

Variety film critic Joe Leydon wrote that Hours' "ingeniously simple setup is cunningly exploited for maximum suspense."
