= My Future Boyfriend =

2011 film set in 32nd century

My Future Boyfriend is a television film starring Sara Rue and Barry Watson. It premiered on ABC Family on April 10, 2011. It is directed by Michael Lange. The screenplay was written by James Orr.

The film begins in the 32nd century, where the concept of love has been forgotten by humanity. A man decides to time travel to the year 2011 in order to investigate the concepts described in 21st-century romance novels. He finds himself in love with a female novelist.

== Synopsis ==
P-A-X-497/341 (aka Pax), a curious human from a well-ordered but loveless year 3127, travels back in time to the year 2011 to satisfy his curiosity about such archaic concepts as love, passion and sex, after finding a book by newly published romance novelist Elizabeth Barrett, who also works at a newspaper that deals in primarily made up stories. He is told that love caused people to act strangely and was one of the root causes for suffering in the world. He decided to go back to the year 2011 to figure what love is.

He winds up making his own discoveries when he meets Elizabeth, who turns out to be the woman of his dreams. Unfortunately, Elizabeth has a boyfriend, Richard. When Pax doesn't return to the future by the given deadline, his fellow scientist Bob travels back in time to find him. Upon returning to the future Pax misses Elizabeth and, she is the only thing he is thinking about. He also feels he has lost his chance with her. Bob lets Pax travel all the way back to where Elizabeth and Richard met, which allows Pax to meet Elizabeth first.

== Cast ==
- Sara Rue as Elizabeth Barrett
- Barry Watson as Pax
- Fred Willard as Bob
- T. J. Hassan as Fred Smatters
- Jordan Wall as Theo Nyborg
- Justin Smith as Richard Babcock
- Valerie Harper as Bobbi Moreau
- Ryan Felton as PROFAX, a HAL 9000-like intelligent computer
- Adam Boyer as Agent Curt Redding
