= List of Samantha Who? episodes =

Season 1 box set, was released on September 23, 2008, in Region 1 format

The following is a list of episodes of the situation comedy television series Samantha Who?. The program premiered on October 15, 2007, in the United States on the American Broadcasting Company (ABC). Created by Cecelia Ahern and Donald Todd, Samantha Who? follows the life of Samantha Newly (Christina Applegate) who was hit by a car and now has retrograde amnesia. Samantha Who? began its first season on October 15, 2007 and concluded on May 12, 2008. A second season of the series aired on ABC's 2008–09 schedule from October 13, 2008, to July 23, 2009. A total of 35 original episodes of Samantha Who? were produced over two seasons.

The show's first season was released to Region 1 DVD by ABC Studios and Disney Studios on September 23, 2008. The second season was released to Region 1 DVD on August 25, 2009.

== Series overview ==
Season	Episodes	Originally released	
Season	Episodes	First released	Last released
1	15	October 15, 2007	April 28, 2008
2	20	October 13, 2008	July 23, 2009

== Episodes ==
=== Season 1 (2007–08) ===
No. overall	No. in season	Title	Directed by	Written by	Original release date	Prod. code	Viewers (millions)
1	1	"Pilot"	Robert Duncan McNeill	Cecelia Ahern & Donald Todd	October 15, 2007	101	14.42
After a hit-and-run accident, a young woman (Samantha) wakes from an 8-day coma only to find that she has amnesia; she, her parents, and her friends start the slow journey of getting to re-know one another.
2	2	"The Job"	Lee Shallat-Chemel	Donald Todd	October 22, 2007	102	13.68
It's Samantha's first day back at work, and her first board meeting gives her a shocking look at how cutthroat and competitive she was.
3	3	"The Wedding"	Michael Spiller	Christine Zander	October 29, 2007	104	14.18
Sam shows up in bridesmaid attire at the wedding of a friend, Valerie (Jessica St. Clair), without realizing that her previous bad behavior had prompted the bride to rescind the invitation; Sam tries to make amends.
4	4	"The Virgin"	Barnet Kellman	Bob Kushell	November 5, 2007	103	12.86
Sam -- with no memories of her sexual experiences -- is torn between experimenting now or waiting for a man she care about.
5	5	"The Restraining Order"	Barnet Kellman	Alex Reid	November 12, 2007	105	13.40
Sam learns that Nathan (Todd Grinnell), one of her ex-boyfriends, has a restraining order against her; she starts wondering what role her relationship with her father has played in her relationships with men.
6	6	"The Hypnotherapist Expert"	Michael Spiller	Pamela Ribon	November 19, 2007	106	14.38
In an effort to regain some memories, Sam seeks help from a hypnotherapist, but it doesn't yield the payoff she expected.
7	7	"The Hockey Date"	Tucker Gates	Justin Adler	November 26, 2007	107	11.69
Regina sets up Samantha with the man (Eddie Cibrian) who's refinishing her floors. Though Sam is initially resistant, she likes the guy and, having presented herself as an avid hockey fan, asks Todd for a crash course in the sport.
8	8	"The Car"	Paul Lazarus	Jim Reynolds	December 3, 2007	109	7.16
After crashing her father's car, Sam pushes it into a lake so he won't know how irresponsible she was. He, in turn, having briefly thought she'd been critically hurt in an accident, buys her a new car, which ups her feelings of guilt. Regina discovers what Sam has done and uses the info to force Sam to model garments at a sales party.
9	9	"The Break-Up"	Tucker Gates	Ric Swartzlander	December 10, 2007	108	6.71
After sleeping with Kevin, Sam convinces herself that she's in love with him and throws herself into the relationship -- but they aren't on the same wavelength.
10	10	"The Girlfriend"	Julie Anne Robinson	Jessi Klein	April 7, 2008	110	10.42
Facing eviction for having illegally sublet her apartment to Todd, Sam is forced to move back in with him and his new girlfriend, Chloe (Kiele Sanchez). Regina and Dena bond when Sam misses a makeover night.
11	11	"The Boss"	Julie Anne Robinson	Jenny Lee	April 14, 2008	111	9.47
Winston (Timothy Olyphant) -- the wealthy owner of the company that Sam and Andrea work for, and the object of Andrea's affection -- asks Sam to marry him.
12	12	"The Butterflies"	Lee Shallat-Chemel	Kim Duran	April 21, 2008	113	9.39
Samantha finds out that a construction project she's in charge of will destroy the habitat of an endangered butterfly; she tries to use Dena to manipulate her boss (Rick Hoffman) into halting the project. Todd and Sam share a passionate kiss.
13	13	"The Gallery Show"	Lee Shallat-Chemel	Alex Reid	April 28, 2008	115	9.87
Invited by Todd to his photo exhibit but unwilling to go alone, Sam asks Craig (Jerry O'Connell), whom she thinks is a stranger, to join her; while there, a memory of an earlier interaction with him surfaces, and the evening doesn't go smoothly. Also at the exhibit, Howard is agitated by a nude portrait of Sam.
14	14	"The Affair"	Paul Lazarus	Bob Kushell	May 5, 2008	114	9.89
Regina's unusual behavior prompts Sam to wonder whether her mother is having an affair -- and to do a little digging. Dena and Andrea contemplate opening a coffee shop.
15	15	"The Birthday"	Dennie Gordon	Donald Todd	May 12, 2008	112	10.24
Samantha wonders whether Chloe is lying about a gravely ill relative just to keep Todd from leaving her. Andrea and Regina argue about a forthcoming birthday party for Sam.

=== Season 2 (2008–09) ===
No. overall	No. in season	Title	Directed by	Written by	Original release date	Prod. code	Viewers (millions)
16	1	"So I Think I Can Dance"	Wendey Stanzler	Marco Pennette	October 13, 2008	201	11.45
Regina's old enemy is in a dance competition, and Regina desperately wants to beat her, but she needs Sam's help. There's only one problem, the new Sam has two left feet, unlike the old Sam who could dance. Meanwhile, Todd weasels his way back into Sam's apartment, just as she was looking to start her new independent life. Roger find's a cat
17	2	"Out of Africa"	Lee Shallat-Chemel	Donald Todd	October 20, 2008	202	9.64
Sam chickens out of going to Africa when she finds out what she has to do to go. She won't tell her family this though, as they predicted she would do this. Instead, she hides out with Dena and Andrea so they think she's gone.
18	3	"The Pill"	Peter Lauer	Dawn DeKeyser	October 27, 2008	203	10.47
Desperate to regain her memory, Sam opts to join a clinical trial and starts taking pills for her memory. Sam's memories start coming back, but she doesn't like what she learns about her former self. Elsewhere, someone confuses Dena and Andrea as being a gay couple, which frustrates Andrea and sends her on the hunt to find someone hotter than Dena.
19	4	"The Building"	Lee Shallat-Chemel	Jim Reynolds	November 3, 2008	204	8.72
Sam and Regina open up a real estate business. Sam wants to do things fairly, but her first client could change her mind. In an attempt to gain a basketball player's phone number, Andrea flirts with Todd's friend, Seth (Stephen Rannazzisi).
20	5	"Help!"	Lee Shallat-Chemel	Pamela Ribon	November 10, 2008	205	10.40
After being given community service for her altercation with a cop, Sam tries to help out Natalie (played by Mary-Kate Olsen) a wayward young woman, despite pleas from her friends not to. Howard tries to give Todd advice on how to win Sam back, even though he told Howard he wasn't interested anymore.
21	6	"The Ex-Girlfriend"	Beth McCarthy-Miller	Jessi Klein	November 17, 2008	206	10.23
Sam breaks the news to Owen, that Todd is not only her roommate, but also her ex-boyfriend. Owen is understanding because his ex-girlfriend, Willow, is his best friend. Ironically, Todd and Willow know each other from art school.
22	7	"The Farm"	Lee Shallat-Chemel	Rafael Garcia	November 24, 2008	207	10.72
Sam and Owen head over to Regina and Howard's for dinner. Everything is going fine until Owen (James Tupper) starts in on the horror of chicken farms, not knowing that Howard owns one. Dena oversteps her boundaries, when she undermines Chapman's authority with his employees. Todd enjoys the apartment alone after not telling Sam his mother isn't coming after all.
23	8	"The Park"	Bob Berlinger	Bob Kushell	December 1, 2008	208	6.04
Sam tries to make herself appear to be an environmentalist, so Owen might like her more. Andrea doesn't fare well when the basketball player, Tony Dane, is looking for a date.
24	9	"The Family Vacation"	Paul Lazarus	Jim Reynolds	December 1, 2008	211	6.51
The Newlys decide to pack it up and head out for an overdue family vacation to a lodge. Sam is met by an unexpected friend at the lodge, Brad (Teddy Sears), who was her childhood sweetheart.
25	10	"My Best Friend's Boyfriend"	Lee Shallat-Chemel	Dawn DeKeyser	March 26, 2009	212	6.57
Sam and Todd double-date with Andrea and pro basketball player Tony Dane. But Todd discovers there's something about Tony that could affect Andrea's interest, and Sam can't help meddling. Dena asks Regina for help after developing an online relationship with a lonely soldier that could make Chase jealous.
26	11	"The Dog"	Paul Lazarus	Pamela Ribon	April 2, 2009	213	4.70
When Sam feels her biological clock ticking away and realizes her desire to be a mother, she tries to probe her own motherly instincts by borrowing Dena's dog to find out if she's nurturing enough to care for and love it. Meanwhile, Regina attempts pilot lessons when she learns that Howard's late step-brother has willed them a plane, and Andrea continues to fuel the tabloid fires while she dates famous pro-basketball star Tony Dane.
27	12	"The Amazing Racist"	Lee Shallat-Chemel	Marco Pennette	April 9, 2009	216	4.83
Sam tries to become friends with Frank, after a real estate client spreads allegations that she's racist. Andrea doesn't want to lose all the glamour of dating a celebrity, after Tony is outed as being gay.
28	13	"The Debt"	Lee Shallat-Chemel	Jim Reynolds	April 16, 2009	215	4.84
Sam runs into financial trouble at the craps table in Vegas with her parents. Could her old boss, Winston Funk (Billy Zane), be just the person she needs to help her out of her jam? Dena pulls a fast one on Andrea after Dena reluctantly agrees to help improve Andrea's image in the media.
29	14	"The Rock Star"	Lee Shallat-Chemel	Marco Pennette	June 25, 2009	209	3.44
Sam alienates her best friends Andrea and Dena after she begins dating a rock superstar, Tommy Wylder (John Taylor).
30	15	"Todd's Job"	Lee Shallat-Chemel	Alex Reid	July 2, 2009	210	3.40
Sam tries to help Todd get a job by sabotaging his competition; Regina puts Dena's house on the market without telling Dena.
31	16	"The Sister"	Lee Shallat-Chemel	Alex Reid	July 2, 2009	214	3.18
Samantha is stunned to learn that she has an aunt, Amy (Christine Ebersole), a grandmother, Loretta (Florence Henderson) and a great grandmother, since no one has mentioned their existence over a longstanding family feud.
32	17	"The Dream Job"	Joanna Kerns	Matthew Carlson	July 9, 2009	217	3.43
After Winston hires her to head his charity foundation, Samantha hires Andrea to be her vice president of legal affairs; Dena, hoping to be a bridesmaid, offers to help Andrea with the wedding plans.
33	18	"The First Date"	Lee Shallat-Chemel	Bob Kushell	July 9, 2009	218	3.11
Samantha tries to find balance between her new job and Todd. Andrea is shadowed by a camera crew for a new reality show on celebrity weddings. Howard's retirement causes problem with Regina.
34	19	"The Other Woman"	Rebecca Asher	Chad Drew & Annie Weisman	July 23, 2009	219	3.43
Samantha vaguely remembers something about her and Winston Funk's ex wife Gigi (Angie Harmon), before the accident. Chapman tries to ask Dena to marry him. Andrea tries to lure Tony Dane into bed. Regina is caught in a love triangle as to prepare to leave on vacation with Howard.
35	20	"With This Ring"	Beth McCarthy-Miller	Donald Todd	July 23, 2009	220	3.19
On Andrea's wedding day to gay pro-basketball player Tony Dane, Sam finds herself at a crossroads and must choose between being with Winston Funk or Todd. Meanwhile, Regina and Howard discover that their lives are beginning to take separate paths.

== Weekly ratings ==
=== Season 1 ===
Orange states that this was the highest rated episode of the season.
Yellow states that this was the lowest rated episode of the season.

Order	Episode	Air Date	U.S. Timeslot (EST)	Rating	Share	18–49	Viewers	Rank
1	"Pilot"	October 15, 2007	Monday 9:30PM	10.2	15	4.2 (#2)	14.92 (#1)	#10
2	"The Job"	October 22, 2007	Monday 9:30PM	9.6	14	4.6 (#2)	14.35 (#1)	#18
3	"The Wedding"	October 29, 2007	Monday 9:30PM	10.5	15	4.9 (#2)	15.36 (#1)	#14
4	"The Virgin"^{†}	November 5, 2007	Monday 9:45PM	10.3	16	4.6 (#2)	12.86 (#1)	#18
5	"The Restraining Order"	November 12, 2007	Monday 9:30PM	9.5	14	4.4 (#2)	14.34 (#1)	#15
6	"The Hypnotherapist"	November 19, 2007	Monday 9:30PM	10.1	15	4.8 (#2)	15.42 (#1)	#13
7	"The Hockey Date"	November 26, 2007	Monday 9:00PM	8.4	12	4.1 (#2)	12.62 (#2)	#22
8	"The Car"	December 3, 2007	Monday 9:00PM	5.0	7	2.9 (#3)	7.53 (#3)	#49
9	"The Break-Up"	December 10, 2007	Monday 9:00PM	4.4	7	2.8 (#3)	6.72 (#3)	#47
10	"The Girlfriend"	April 7, 2008	Monday 9:30PM	7.3	11	3.4 (#2)	11.80 (#2)	#19
11	"The Boss"	April 14, 2008	Monday 9:30PM	6.4	10	3.0 (#3)	9.98 (#3)	#25
12	"The Butterflies"	April 21, 2008	Monday 9:30PM	7.0	11	2.9 (#3)	10.13 (#3)	#27
13	"The Gallery Show"	April 28, 2008	Monday 9:30PM	10.4	15	3.1 (#3)	9.87 (#3)	

=== Season 2 ===
Red states that this was the highest rated episode of the season.
Green states that this was the lowest rated episode of the season.

Order	Episode	Air Date	U.S. Timeslot (EST)	Rating	Share	18–49	Viewers	Rank
14	"The Affair"	September 29, 2008	Monday 9:30PM	7.1	11	3.0 (#3)	10.53 (#4)	#24
15	"The Birthday"	October 6, 2008	Monday 9:30PM	7.5	11	3.2 (#5)	11.02 (#4)	#17
16	"So I Think I Can Dance"	October 13, 2008	Monday 9:30PM	7.9	12	3.1	11.45	#17
17	"Out of Africa"	October 20, 2008	Monday 9:30PM	7.4	11	3.0	9.64	#17
18	"The Pill"	October 27, 2008	Monday 9:30PM	7.6	11	3.0	10.45	
19	"The Building"	November 3, 2008	Monday 9:30PM	6.5	10	2.7	9.71	
20	"Help"	November 10, 2008	Monday 9:30PM	7.3	11	3.0	11.03	
21	"The-Ex"	November 17, 2008	Monday 9:30PM	7.3	11	3.0	11.12	
22	"The Farm"	November 24, 2008	Monday 9:30PM	7.7	11	3.2	11.93	
23	"The Park"	December 1, 2008	Monday 9:00PM	4.3	6	2.2	6.70	
24	"The Family Vacation"	December 1, 2008	Monday 9:30PM	4.3	6	2.1	6.79	
25	"My Best Friends Boyfriend"	March 26, 2009	Thursday 8:30PM	4.5	7	2.2	6.57	
26	"The Dog"	April 2, 2009	Thursday 8:30PM	3.2	5	1.4	4.90	
27	"The Amazing Racist"	April 9, 2009	Thursday 8:30PM	3.2	6	1.4	4.87	
28	"The Debt"	April 16, 2009	Thursday 8:30PM	3.3	6	1.5	4.96	
29	"The Rock Star"	June 25, 2009	Thursday 8:00PM	2.6	5	1.0	3.72	
30	"Todd's Job"	July 2, 2009	Thursday 8:00PM / 8:30 PM	2.2	4	1.0	3.50	
31	"The Sister"	July 2, 2009	Thursday 8:00PM / 8:30 PM	2.2	4	1.0	3.28	
32	"The Dream Job"	July 9, 2009	Thursday 8:00PM / 8:30 PM	2.2	5	1.0	3.59	
33	"The First Date"	July 9, 2009	Thursday 8:00PM / 8:30 PM	2.1	4	1.0	3.23	
34	"The Other Woman"	July 23, 2009	Thursday 8:00PM / 8:30 PM			0.9	3.46	
35	"With This Ring"	July 23, 2009	Thursday 8:00PM / 8:30 PM			0.9	3.31	
