= Kumpanía: Flamenco Los Angeles =

- Directed by: Katina Dunn
- Produced by: Katina Dunn; Kevin Dunn; Noah Berlow
- Starring: Antonio de Jerez; Jose Tanaka; Timo Nunez; Briseyda Zarate Fernandez; Mizuho Sato
- Narrated by: Bruce Bisenz
- Cinematography: Avi Cohen
- Edited by: Noah Berlow
- Music by: Canyon Cody; Sean Dwyer; Jose Tanaka
- Distributed by: Nelson Madison / Indie Rights
- Release date: October 13, 2011 (Buffalo International Film Festival)
- Running time: 60 minutes
- Country: United States
- Language: English

Kumpanía: Flamenco Los Angeles is a 2011 independent documentary film by director Katina Dunn. The film explores flamenco, including its origins in the oppressed Gypsy community in 17th-century southern Spain and also the flamenco culture of contemporary Spain.

The documentary focuses specifically on a group of flamenco dancers, singers, and guitarists in Los Angeles, who are dedicated to preserving the art in its original form. "Kumpanía" is a Romani word meaning "people who travel the same territory".

== Overview ==
After providing an overview of the Romani origins of flamenco in 17th-century Spain, Kumpanía intercuts live performance footage with interviews and opinions from various singers, guitarists, and dancers. The performers describe what flamenco means both historically and also to them personally, and relate how they came to be involved in it.

The focus of Kumpanía is a group of contemporary musicians and dancers in Los Angeles. These performers are dedicated to preserving the flamenco puro style of music and dance closely aligned with its original Gypsy roots, rather than the diluted showy style commonly seen in popular culture.

Although dedicated to authentic flamenco, diversity is also present both in the film and in the artists showcased. "The dozen-plus performers featured in the film hail from varied backgrounds. Singer Antonio de Jerez is Spanish Romani, dancer Mizuho Sato and guitarist José Tanaka are Japanese, and dancer Briseyda Zarate Fernandez and percussionist Joey Heredia are of Mexican descent", noted the Los Angeles Times. Shockya notes that "Gitano, Spanish, Mexican, Japanese and French flamenco, among others" are displayed in the film.

The film also focuses on the emotional depth and commitment of both the music and the performers. According to director Katina Dunn, flamenco, like blues, is "an expression of pain or isolation or happiness". One of the film's subjects, dancer Briseyda Zarate Fernandez, commented that flamenco "is unlike any other dance form and unlike any other art form. It’s a really passionate, emotive art form that also is very musically and technically sophisticated. So it has the sophistication of ... classical music or contemporary or ballet dance, and then it also has ... the emotive, passionate aspect where you really get to see the inner workings and intimate emotions of a human being."

== Production ==
A good deal of the film was shot at the Fountain Theatre, which showcases flamenco every week. Many of the featured Los Angeles flamenco dancers, singers, and guitarists perform there, and they were filmed there in live performance, and interviewed at the theater for the film. Deborah Lawlor, co-artistic director of the theater, is also interviewed.

== Screenings ==
Kumpanía: Flamenco Los Angeles premiered on October 13, 2011 at the Buffalo International Film Festival, where it won the Audience Award. It screened at additional national and international festivals, where it received additional awards, including the Audience Award at the Madrid International Film Festival. In Madrid, director Katina Dunn was also interviewed on RTVE radio regarding the film and the flamenco culture in Los Angeles. Many of Kumpanía's festival screenings were accompanied by live flamenco demonstrations.

Kumpanía had its Los Angeles premiere on January 31, 2013 at the El Cid restaurant's Flamenco Dinner Theatre in Hollywood. In May 2013 the documentary had its Los Angeles festival premiere at the 16th Annual Dances With Films festival, at the TCL Chinese Theatre in Hollywood.

== Awards ==
- Audience Award – Buffalo International Film Festival 2011
- Best Documentary Award – On Location: Memphis International Film & Music Festival 2012
- Best Documentary Award – Peloponnesian International Film Festival 2012
- Audience Award – Madrid International Film Festival 2012
