= TJ Hassan =

British actor (born 1981)

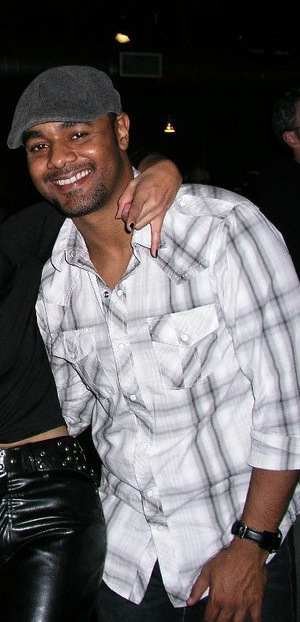
- Hassan at Comic-Con 2010
- Born: 23 May 1981 (age 45); Kingsbury, London, England
- Occupation: Actor
- Years active: 2008–present

TJ Hassan (born 23 May 1981) is a British film, television and stage actor. He is perhaps best known for several supporting and leading roles both in independent and mainstream films and television.

== Career ==
His first film role was in the Jerry Zaks directed 2008 biopic Who Do You Love?, playing Lonnie Johnson, an American blues musician, opposite Alessandro Nivola and Chi McBride. Other supporting roles in films included Lottery Ticket, The Change-Up and For Colored Girls. Television appearances include guest starring as Major Brett Hagen, an Army psychiatrist on the Lifetime series Army Wives, Detective Chico Cubbs on the Comedy Central-produced series M'larky, along with Dan Fogler, Gilbert Gottfried, Jeffrey Ross, and Lennon Parham, and the ABC Family film My Future Boyfriend. He was also the face of the 2010 Coke Zero Playbook of Possibilities campaign.

== Filmography ==
=== Film ===
Year	Title	Role	Notes
2008	Who Do You Love?	Lonnie Johnson	
2010	Lottery Ticket	Interviewee	Uncredited
2010	For Colored Girls	Bill #2	Uncredited
2011	The Change-Up	Kinkabe Lawyer	
2012	Echo at 11 Oak Drive	Clark	
2013	Hours	Jeremy	

=== Television ===
Year	Title	Role	Notes
2008–2010	Army Wives	Major Brett Hagen / Sgt. Walsh	4 episodes
2010	M'larky	Detective Chico Cubbs	5 episodes
2010	Atom TV	Detective Chico Cubbs	Episode: "M'Larky"
2011	My Future Boyfriend	Fred Smatters	Television film
2011	The Vampire Diaries	Coach	Episode: "Smells Like Teen Spirit"
2012	Let's Stay Together	Rene	Episode: "Owners, Players and Thieves"
2012	Revolution	Monroe Guard	Episode: "The Children's Crusade"
2012	Homeland	Sentry	Episode: "The Choice"
2013	Necessary Roughness	Officer Chuck Silvia	2 episodes
2015	Quantico	Quantico Agent	Episode: "Run"
2016	The Detour	Max	Episode: "The Restaurant"
2018	Love Is	Chris	2 episodes
2022	Pieces of Her	California Highway Patrol	Episode #1.6
2023	Aqua Teen Hunger Force	Blade/Wesley Snipes	Episode: "Shaketopia"
