= Barry Watson (actor) =

American actor (born 1974)

- Born: Michael Barrett Watson; April 23, 1974 (age 52); Traverse City, Michigan, U.S.
- Occupation: Actor
- Years active: 1990–present
- Spouses: Laura Payne-Gabriel (m. 1996; div. 2002) Tracy Hutson (m. 2006; div. 2010) Natasha Gregson Wagner (m. 2014)
- Children: 3

Michael Barrett "Barry" Watson (born April 23, 1974) is an American actor known for his roles of Matt Camden on 7th Heaven, Brian Davis in What About Brian, Todd Deepler in Samantha Who? and Lachlan Murdoch in The Loudest Voice.

== Early life ==
Watson, the third of four children, was born in Traverse City, Michigan. His father worked as an attorney and his mother as a paralegal. At the age of eight, his family moved to Dallas, Texas. Watson was fourteen when his parents divorced. When he was fifteen, he moved to Burbank, California, where he immediately landed a six month contract on the soap opera Days of Our Lives. After his contract ended, Watson moved back to Texas, and graduated from Richardson High School in 1992.

== Career ==
Watson had guest spots in several television series such as Baywatch and Sister, Sister. Eventually he was chosen for a minor role on the Aaron Spelling series Malibu Shores. Though his role was brief, it led him to Aaron Spelling's next project, 7th Heaven.

It was on The WB's 7th Heaven that Watson finally gained much recognition for his portrayal as Matt Camden. Watson said in 2016 that his mindset at the time was one of wanting to get paid despite his unsureness in the project or why the people involved wanted him to participate in the first place. He stopped being a full-time regular after the sixth season, mainly due to his cancer diagnosis, but continued in a recurring and guest star status on the show until its 10th season. In his break from acting on 7th Heaven, he was brought in to write an episode by series creator and producer Brenda Hampton. He did not appear at all during the eleventh and final season.

In 1999, he starred in his first feature film with fellow WB star Katie Holmes in Teaching Mrs. Tingle. Watson hoped that his role in the film would help him avoid being pigeonholed by his role in 7th Heaven. During the production, Watson felt "strange" at times due to his being the only male on set, but had "an amazing experience" working with his co-stars. Watson directed two episodes of 7th Heaven in 2005, and likewise directed one episode of The Secret Life of the American Teenager in 2010.

In 2002, Watson had a starring role as Dave and his alter ego Daisy in Sorority Boys; his performance was met with a mixed reception amid the film being panned. In a negative review, Lindy Keffer of pluggedin.com lamented that Watson's presence in the film would bring it additional attention.

From 2006 to 2007, Watson starred as the lead character, Brian Davis, in the ABC series What About Brian. Watson also starred as Todd in the ABC series Samantha Who? In 2011, he played Pax in My Future Boyfriend, an ABC Family original movie. In 2012, Watson appeared on Gossip Girl as Serena Van der Woodsen's boyfriend.

In 2014, he enjoyed guest-starring roles on the television shows Masters of Sex and Hart of Dixie. He also starred in the television films Far from Home and The Santa Con.

In 2019, Watson starred in the Showtime drama The Loudest Voice, which tells the story of Roger Ailes and the rise of Fox News. Watson played Lachlan Murdoch, the son of media mogul and owner of News Corp, Rupert Murdoch.

== Personal life ==
Watson has been married three times. His first marriage was to Laura Payne-Gabriel, whom he met through actress Tori Spelling. He and Tracy Hutson had their first son, Oliver, in May 2005, and their second son in November 2007, Felix Watson. They parted in 2010. In May 2012, Watson and girlfriend Natasha Gregson Wagner, daughter of producer Richard Gregson and actress Natalie Wood, had a daughter. They married on December 21, 2014.

In May 2002, at age 28, Watson was diagnosed with stage IIB Hodgkin lymphoma after experiencing persistent fatigue and discovering a lump in his neck. He underwent chemotherapy every two weeks for six months, temporarily stepping away from acting while remaining involved with 7th Heaven as a member of the writing staff. Watson completed treatment in October 2002; the cancer became undetectable during treatment, and he subsequently entered remission. He later returned to 7th Heaven and has remained in remission in the years since.

== Filmography ==
=== Film ===
Year	Title	Role	Notes
1999	Teaching Mrs. Tingle	Luke Churner	MTV Movie Awards (nominated); Teen Choice Awards (nominated)
2001	When Strangers Appear	Jack Barrett	
2001	Ocean's Eleven	Himself	Cameo
2002	Sorority Boys	Dave/Daisy	Teen Choice Awards (nominated)
2004	Love on the Side	Jeff Sweeney	
2005	Boogeyman	Tim Jensen	
2012	Kiss at Pine Lake	Luke	
2014	Far from Home	Nicholas Bell	
2015	Ominous	Michael	
2017	An Hour Behind	Parker	
2019	A Dog's Way Home	Gavin	
2019	My Mom's Letter from Heaven	Connor Johnson	
2021	Highway to Heaven	Bruce	

=== Television ===
Year	Title	Role	Notes
1990	Days of Our Lives	Randy	3 episodes
1993	Fatal Deception: Mrs. Lee Harvey Oswald	Young Guy at TV Station	Television film
1993	Attack of the 50 Ft. Woman	Teen Boy	Television film
1994	The Nanny	Greg	Episode: "Everybody Needs a Bubby" (uncredited)
1995	Sister, Sister	Barney	Episodes: "Thanksgiving in Hawaii: Parts I & II"
1996	Baywatch	Thomas Edward 'Cowboy' O'Hara	Episode: "The Incident"
1996	Co-ed Call Girl	Jack Collins	Television film
1996	Nash Bridges	Trent	Episode: "Home Invasion"
1996	Malibu Shores	Seth	4 episodes
1996–2006	7th Heaven	Matt Camden	Main role (seasons 1–6 & 9); special guest star (seasons 7, 8, & 10)
2006–2007	What About Brian	Brian Davis	Main role
2007–2009	Samantha Who?	Todd Deepler	Main role
2010	Drop Dead Diva	Evan	Episode: "Good Grief"
2011	My Future Boyfriend	Pax	Television film
2011	The Chateau Meroux	Chris	Television film
2012	Gossip Girl	Steven Spence	Recurring role
2012	Wedding Band	Boboroff	Episode: "We Are Family"
2013	Wilfred	Michael	Episode: "Suspicion"
2014	Hart of Dixie	Davis Polk	Recurring role
2014	Masters of Sex	Shelley Decklin	Episodes: "Fight", "Blackbird"
2017	Date My Dad	Ricky Cooper	Main role
2017	An Hour Behind	Parker	TV Movie
2018	A Very Nutty Christmas	Chip	TV Movie
2019	The Loudest Voice	Lachlan Murdoch	Recurring role
2020	Into the Dark	Henry Cameron	Episode: "The Current Occupant"
2022	Naomi	Greg McDuffie	Main role
