= Samantha Who? =

American television sitcom

- Genre: Sitcom
- Created by: Cecelia Ahern; Donald Todd
- Starring: Christina Applegate; Jennifer Esposito; Kevin Dunn; Melissa McCarthy; Tim Russ; Barry Watson; Jean Smart
- Narrated by: Christina Applegate
- Music by: Jan Stevens
- Country of origin: United States
- Original language: English
- No. of seasons: 2
- No. of episodes: 35 (list of episodes)

Production
- Executive producers: Christina Applegate; Donald Todd; Peter Traugott; Bob Kushell; Alex Reid; Marco Pennette
- Producers: John Amodeo; Cecelia Ahern; Christina Applegate; Jim Reynolds; Leslie Waldman; Andy Bobrow; Matthew Carlson; Jerram A. Swartz; Neil Rapp
- Production locations: Los Angeles, California
- Camera setup: Single-camera
- Running time: 22 minutes
- Production companies: Donald Todd Productions; Brillstein Entertainment Partners; ABC Studios

Original release
- Network: ABC
- Release: October 15, 2007 – July 23, 2009

Samantha Who? is an American television sitcom that originally aired on ABC from October 15, 2007, to July 23, 2009. The series was created by Cecelia Ahern and Donald Todd, who also served as producers. Although highly rated during its first season, the sitcom lost viewers throughout its second season, and ABC canceled the show in May 2009 before the remaining seven episodes were burned off the 2008–09 TV schedule.

The series was produced by Brillstein Entertainment Partners and ABC Studios and executive produced by Christina Applegate, Donald Todd, Peter Traugott, Bob Kushell, Alex Reid, and Marco Pennette.

== Plot ==
The show centered on Samantha Newly (Christina Applegate), a vice president of a real estate firm who develops retrograde amnesia after a hit and run accident. After awakening, she progressively realizes to her dismay that she had been selfish and unlikable before her accident, and therefore sets out to make amends and become a better daughter to her somewhat dysfunctional parents, Howard (Kevin Dunn) and Regina (Jean Smart), a better friend to self-centered Andrea (Jennifer Esposito) and needy but well-meaning Dena (Melissa McCarthy), and a better on-again, off-again girlfriend to her roommate and ex-boyfriend, Todd (Barry Watson). Wryly observing her transformation from "Old Sam" to "New Sam" is Samantha's bemused doorman, Frank (Tim Russ).

== Production history ==
Produced by ABC Studios, Donald Todd Productions, and Brillstein-Grey Television, the series was officially greenlit and given a thirteen-episode order on May 11, 2007.

The show was originally named Sam I Am until ABC renamed it Samantha Be Good due to conflicts with the estate of Dr. Seuss. TV Guide later reported that ABC had changed the title of the series once more to Samantha Who?. Early television promotions for the series, playing off of the concept of its lead character's amnesia, appeared without stating any specific title. The lack of stated title (with a question mark shown instead) was attributed in promotions to Applegate's character not remembering the name of the series.

The series premiered on October 15, 2007, at 9:30PM Eastern/8:30PM Central and moved to 9:00PM Eastern/8:00PM Central on Mondays on November 26, 2007.

On October 25, 2007, ABC ordered six additional scripts for Samantha Who?.

On October 30, 2007, ABC ordered a full season of 22 episodes for Samantha Who?. However, due to the 2007–2008 Writers Guild of America strike, only 15 episodes were produced for season one.

On February 11, 2008, ABC picked up Samantha Who? for the 2008–09 television season.

On October 31, 2008, ABC ordered seven more episodes of Samantha Who? bringing the total number of episodes for the show's second season to 20. The announcement came in advance of mandated budget cuts at ABC Studios, which produces the series.

The series, which was filmed in the single-camera format, went on hiatus during the 2008–2009 television season and returned in a new timeslot on Thursday, March 26, 2009, following In the Motherhood before being pulled.

On May 18, 2009, ABC announced that they would not be renewing Samantha Who? for a third season. ABC burned off the final episodes on Thursday nights at 8:00PM Eastern/7:00PM Central from June 25, 2009, until the finale on July 23, 2009 (with additional episodes airing Thursday, July 2 and Thursday, July 9 at 8:30PM Eastern/7:30PM Central).

Pop began rebroadcasting the series in September 2011.

== Cast and characters ==
- Christina Applegate as Samantha "Sam" Newly
- Jennifer Esposito as Andrea Belladonna
- Kevin Dunn as Howard Newly
- Melissa McCarthy as Dena
- Tim Russ as Frank
- Barry Watson as Todd Deepler
- Jean Smart as Regina Newly

== Episodes ==
Season	Episodes	Originally released	
Season	Episodes	First released	Last released
1	15	October 15, 2007	April 28, 2008
2	20	October 13, 2008	July 23, 2009

== U.S. television ratings ==
=== Standard ratings ===
In the following summary, "rating" is the percentage of all households with televisions that tuned to the show, and "share" is the percentage of all televisions in use at that time that are tuned in. "18–49" is the percentage of all adults aged 18–49 tuned into the show. "Viewers" are the number of viewers, in millions, watching at the time. "Rank"; how well the show did compared to other TV shows aired that week.

Unless otherwise cited, the overnight rating, share, 18–49 and viewing information come from Your Entertainment Now. The weekly ranks come from ABC Medianet.

^{†} This episode started at 9:45PM, so the ratings are estimated and are the average of the 9:30 half-hour and the 10:00 half-hour.

- For the first six episodes of Samantha Who?, the show held the title of highest rated sitcom, a title which was held consistently by Two and a Half Men for the previous two television seasons.
- Samantha Who? was, for its first seven episodes, the highest rated sitcom which debuted during the 2007–2008 television season.

Without a strong lead-in (provided by Dancing with the Stars in its fifth and sixth seasons) and paired with another failing ABC comedy In the Motherhood, the ratings for Samantha Who? dropped to lows of around 4 million in its second season.

=== Seasonal ratings ===
Seasonal rankings (based on average total viewers per episode) of Samantha Who? on ABC:

Note: Each U.S. network television season starts in late September (sometimes in early October) and ends in late May, or occasionally early June, which coincides with the completion of May sweeps.

Season	Episodes	Timeslot (Eastern)	Premiere	Finale	TV season	Rank	Viewers (in millions)	18–49 Rating/Share (rank)
1	15	Monday 9:30 P.M. (October 15, 2007 – November 19, 2007) Monday 9:00 P.M. (November 26, 2007 – December 10, 2007) Monday 9:30 P.M. (April 7, 2008 – May 12, 2008)	October 15, 2007	May 12, 2008	2007–2008	#26	11.82	TBA
2	20	Monday 9:30 P.M. (October 13, 2008 – December 1, 2008) Thursday 8:30 P.M.(March 26, 2009 – July 23, 2009) Thursday 8:00 P.M. (June 25, 2009 – July 23, 2009)	October 13, 2008	July 23, 2009	2008–2009	#54	8.9	TBA

=== Ratings competition ===
Samantha Who? first aired against fellow freshmen show K-Ville on FOX. It also aired against Rules of Engagement on CBS, Heroes on NBC and The Game on The CW—each in their second season. This was for the first six episodes Samantha Who? aired at 9:30pm.

On November 26, 2007, Samantha Who? shifted to the 9pm time slot. Its competition shifted from The Game to Girlfriends on The CW and from Rules of Engagement to Two and a Half Men on CBS. Sophomore sitcom Notes from the Underbelly assumed the 9:30pm position.

== DVD releases ==
Walt Disney Studios Home Entertainment released the entire series on DVD in Region 1. They also released season 1 on DVD in Region 2 & Region 4 (Australia). Both seasons contain several special features including bloopers and deleted scenes. The Region 1 releases have been discontinued and are out of print.

On February 9, 2012, it was announced that Lionsgate Home Entertainment had acquired the rights to the series and plan on re-releasing it. Seasons 1 and 2 were re-released on May 1, 2012.

DVD name	Ep #	Region 1	Region 2	Region 4	Special features
The Complete First Season	15	September 23, 2008; May 1, 2012 (re-released)	May 3, 2010	February 12, 2009	Deleted Scenes; Gag Reel; Comments in Audio
The Complete Second and Final Season	20	August 25, 2009; May 1, 2012 (re-released)	N/A	N/A	Kit for Beginners; Deleted Scenes; Gag Reel; Conversation of Girls; Set Tour with Christina Applegate; Moment "Dance" Christina

== Awards and nominations ==
Awards and nominations received by Samantha Who
Award	Year	Category	Nominee(s)	Result	Ref.
BMI Film and TV Awards	2008	BMI TV Music Award	Jan Stevens	Won	
Golden Globe Awards	2008	Best Actress – Musical or Comedy Series	Christina Applegate	Nominated	
Golden Globe Awards	2009	Best Actress – Musical or Comedy Series	Christina Applegate	Nominated	
People's Choice Awards	2008	Favorite New Series – Comedy	Samantha Who?	Won	
People's Choice Awards	2008	Favorite Television Series – Comedy	Samantha Who?	Nominated	
People's Choice Awards	2008	Favorite Female TV Star	Christina Applegate	Won	
Primetime Emmy Awards	2008	Outstanding Lead Actress in a Comedy Series	Christina Applegate	Nominated	
Primetime Emmy Awards	2008	Outstanding Supporting Actress in a Comedy Series	Jean Smart	Won	
Primetime Emmy Awards	2009	Outstanding Lead Actress in a Comedy Series	Christina Applegate	Nominated	
PRISM Awards	2008	Performance in a Comedy Series	Christina Applegate	Nominated	
PRISM Awards	2008	Comedy Episode	"Pilot"	Nominated	
Satellite Awards	2008	Best Actress in a Television Series, Comedy or Musical	Christina Applegate	Nominated	
Screen Actors Guild Awards	2008	Outstanding Actress – Comedy Series	Christina Applegate	Nominated	
Screen Actors Guild Awards	2009	Outstanding Actress – Comedy Series	Christina Applegate	Nominated	
Screen Actors Guild Awards	2010	Outstanding Actress – Comedy Series	Christina Applegate	Nominated	
Teen Choice Awards	2008	Choice TV Actor: Comedy	Barry Watson	Nominated	
Teen Choice Awards	2008	Choice TV Actress: Comedy	Christina Applegate	Nominated	
Teen Choice Awards	2008	Choice TV: Breakout Show	Samantha Who?	Nominated	
Television Critics Association Awards	2008	Individual Achievement in Comedy	Christina Applegate	Nominated	

== Broadcast ==
In the United Kingdom the series was broadcast on E4 and Comedy Central. The series aired in Ireland on TG4. In New Zealand the series ran on TV 2, and in Australia the series aired on Seven Network and 7Two. The series later reran on Pop and currently reruns in Logo TV.
