= List of awards and nominations received by Melissa McCarthy =

Melissa McCarthy awards
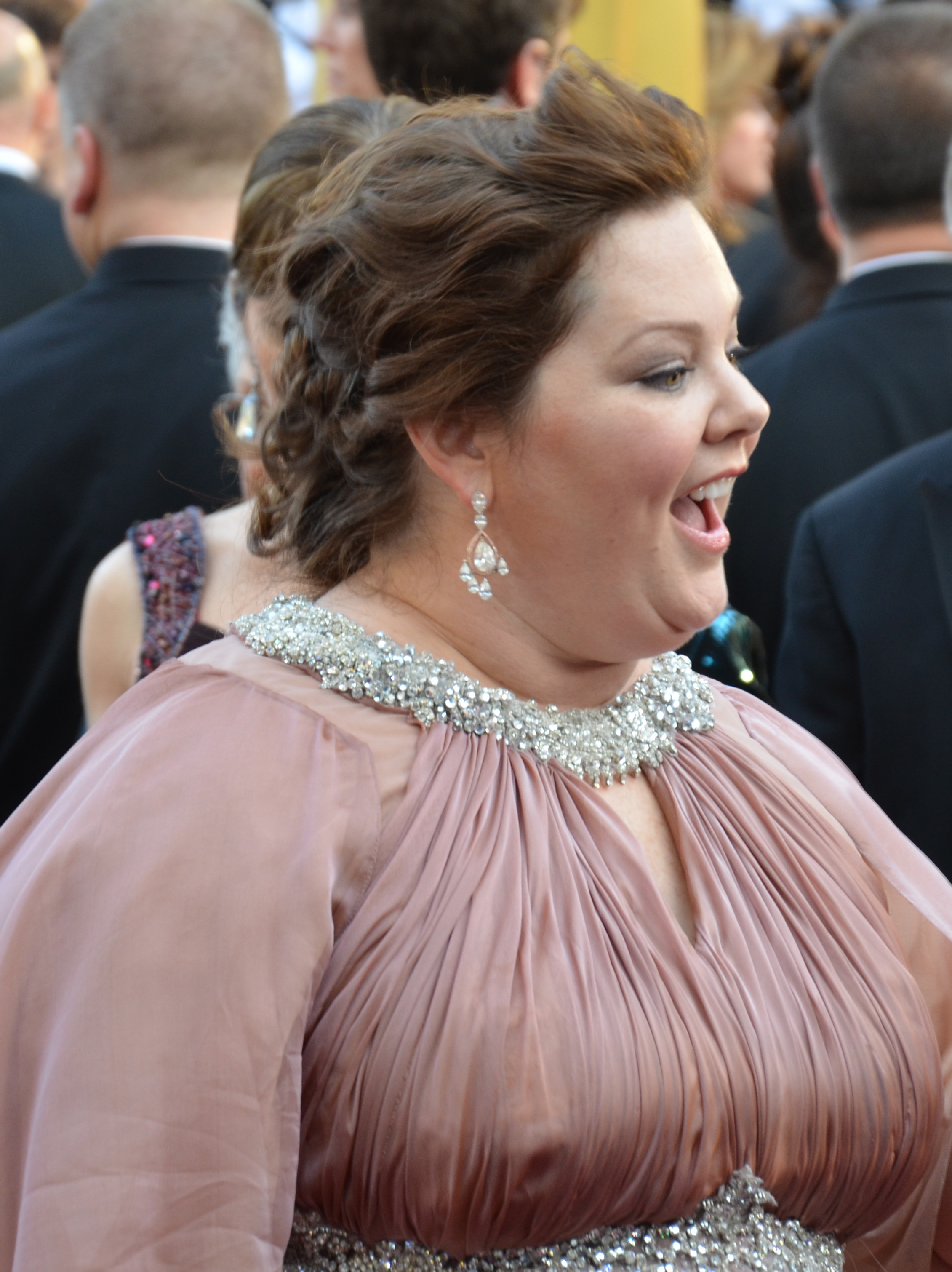
- McCarthy at the 84th Academy Awards in 2012, where she received a Best Supporting Actress nomination for her comic role in Bridesmaids
Totals
Award	Wins	Nominations
Academy Awards	0	2
BAFTA Awards	0	2
Critics' Choice Awards	0	6
Golden Globe Awards	0	2
Primetime Emmy Awards	2	8
Screen Actors Guild Awards	0	3
Awards	31
Nominations	110
Honors	4

The following is a list of awards and nominations received by Melissa McCarthy.

Melissa McCarthy is American actress, comedian and producer. Over her career she has received two Primetime Emmy Awards as well as nominations for two Academy Awards, two BAFTA Awards, two Golden Globe Awards and three Screen Actors Guild Awards.

For her performance in the comedy film Bridesmaids (2011), McCarthy received nominations for the BAFTA Award, Critics' Choice Movie Award, SAG Award, and Academy Award for Best Supporting Actress. Along with the ensemble cast of Bridesmaids, she received nominations for the SAG Award, Critics' Choice Movie Award, and numerous other critics groups. For her performance in the action comedy film Spy (2015), she received a Golden Globe Award nomination. McCarthy portrayed Lee Israel in the biographical drama film Can You Ever Forgive Me? (2018), for which she received nominations for the BAFTA Award, Critics' Choice Movie Award, SAG Award, Golden Globe Award, and Academy Award for Best Actress.

Among other accolades, McCarthy also received an MTV Movie Award for Best Comedic Performance, Comedy Award for Best Comedic Actress, and the Santa Barbara International Film Festival's Virtuoso Award and Montecito Award. In 2016, she became the first woman to ever win the Comedic Genius Award at the MTV Movie Awards. She is a recipient of the Primetime Emmy Award for Outstanding Lead Actress in a Comedy Series in 2011 for her performance in the comedy series Mike & Molly and the Primetime Emmy Award for Outstanding Guest Actress in a Comedy Series in 2017 for her performance in the variety series Saturday Night Live. In 2015, she received a motion picture star on the Hollywood Walk of Fame.

In 2020, The New York Times ranked McCarthy as #22 in its list of the 25 Greatest Actors of the 21st Century.

== Major associations ==
=== Academy Awards ===
Year	Category	Nominated work	Result	Ref.
2012	Best Supporting Actress	Bridesmaids	Nominated	
2019	Best Actress	Can You Ever Forgive Me?	Nominated	

=== BAFTA Awards ===
Year	Category	Nominated work	Result	Ref.
British Academy Film Awards
2012	Best Actress in a Supporting Role	Bridesmaids	Nominated	
2019	Best Actress in a Leading Role	Can You Ever Forgive Me?	Nominated	

=== Critics' Choice Awards ===
Year	Category	Nominated work	Result	Ref.
Critics' Choice Movie Awards
2012	Best Supporting Actress	Bridesmaids	Nominated	
2012	Best Acting Ensemble	Bridesmaids	Nominated	
2014	Best Actress in a Comedy	The Heat	Nominated	
2015	Best Actress in a Comedy	St. Vincent	Nominated	
2016	Best Actress in a Comedy	Spy	Nominated	
2019	Best Actress	Can You Ever Forgive Me?	Nominated	

=== Emmy Awards ===
Year	Category	Nominated work	Result	Ref.
Primetime Emmy Awards
2011	Outstanding Lead Actress in a Comedy Series	Mike & Molly (episode: "First Date")	Won	
2012	Outstanding Lead Actress in a Comedy Series	Mike & Molly (episode: "The Dress")	Nominated	
2012	Outstanding Guest Actress in a Comedy Series	Saturday Night Live (episode: "Melissa McCarthy / Lady Antebellum")	Nominated	
2013	Outstanding Guest Actress in a Comedy Series	Saturday Night Live (episode: "Melissa McCarthy / Phoenix")	Nominated	
2014	Outstanding Lead Actress in a Comedy Series	Mike & Molly (episode: "Mind Over Molly")	Nominated	
2014	Outstanding Guest Actress in a Comedy Series	Saturday Night Live (episode: "Melissa McCarthy / Imagine Dragons")	Nominated	
2016	Outstanding Guest Actress in a Comedy Series	Saturday Night Live (episode: "Melissa McCarthy / Kanye West")	Nominated	
2017	Outstanding Guest Actress in a Comedy Series	Saturday Night Live (episode: "Melissa McCarthy / Haim")	Won	

=== Golden Globe Awards ===
Year	Category	Nominated work	Result	Ref.
2016	Best Actress in a Motion Picture – Musical or Comedy	Spy	Nominated	
2019	Best Actress in a Motion Picture – Drama	Can You Ever Forgive Me?	Nominated	

=== Screen Actors Guild Awards ===
Year	Category	Nominated work	Result	Ref.
2012	Outstanding Actress in a Supporting Role	Bridesmaids	Nominated	
2012	Outstanding Cast in a Motion Picture	Bridesmaids	Nominated	
2019	Outstanding Actress in a Leading Role	Can You Ever Forgive Me?	Nominated	

== Miscellaneous awards ==
Awards and nominations received by Melissa McCarthy
Award	Year	Category	Nominated work	Result	Ref.
Golden Raspberry Awards	2015	Worst Actress	Tammy	Nominated	
Golden Raspberry Awards	2019	Worst Picture	The Happytime Murders	Nominated	
Golden Raspberry Awards	2019	Worst Actress	Life of the Party	Won	
Golden Raspberry Awards	2019	Worst Actress	The Happytime Murders	Won	
Golden Raspberry Awards	2019	Worst Screen Combo^{G}	The Happytime Murders	Nominated	
Golden Raspberry Awards	2019	Razzie Redeemer Award	Can You Ever Forgive Me?	Won	
Golden Raspberry Awards	2025	Worst Screen Combo^{G}	Unfrosted	Nominated	
Kids' Choice Awards	2017	Favorite Movie Actress	Ghostbusters	Won	
Kids' Choice Awards	2021	Favorite Movie Actress	Superintelligence	Nominated	
Kids' Choice Awards	2024	Favorite Movie Actress	The Little Mermaid	Nominated	
Kids' Choice Awards	2024	Favorite Villain	The Little Mermaid	Nominated	
MTV Movie & TV Awards	2012	Best Cast	Bridesmaids	Nominated	
MTV Movie & TV Awards	2012	Best Comedic Performance	Bridesmaids	Won	
MTV Movie & TV Awards	2012	Best WTF Moment^{[A]}	Bridesmaids	Won	
MTV Movie & TV Awards	2012	Breakthrough Performance	Bridesmaids	Nominated	
MTV Movie & TV Awards	2014	Best Comedic Performance	The Heat	Nominated	
MTV Movie & TV Awards	2014	Best Fight^{[B]}	Identity Thief	Nominated	
MTV Movie & TV Awards	2014	Best Musical Moment	Identity Thief	Nominated	
MTV Movie & TV Awards	2016	Best Comedic Performance	Spy	Nominated	
MTV Movie & TV Awards	2016	Best Fight (with Nargis Fakhri) ^{[C]}	Spy	Nominated	
MTV Movie & TV Awards	2017	Trending	"Sean Spicer's Press Conference" (from Saturday Night Live)	Nominated	
People's Choice Award	2014	Favorite Comedic Movie Actress	The Heat / Identity Thief	Nominated	
People's Choice Award	2014	Favorite Movie Actress	The Heat / Identity Thief	Nominated	
People's Choice Award	2014	Favorite Movie Duo^{[D]}	The Heat	Nominated	
People's Choice Award	2014	Favorite Comedic TV Actress	Mike & Molly	Nominated	
People's Choice Award	2015	Favorite Comedic Movie Actress	Tammy	Won	
People's Choice Award	2015	Favorite Movie Actress	Tammy	Nominated	
People's Choice Award	2015	Favorite Comedic TV Actress	Mike & Molly	Nominated	
People's Choice Award	2016	Favorite Comedic Movie Actress	Spy	Won	
People's Choice Award	2016	Favorite Movie Actress	Spy	Nominated	
People's Choice Award	2016	Favorite Comedic TV Actress	Mike & Molly	Won	
People's Choice Award	2017	Favorite Comedic Movie Actress	Ghostbusters / The Boss	Won	
People's Choice Award	2017	Favorite Movie Actress	Ghostbusters / The Boss	Nominated	
People's Choice Award	2018	The Comedy Movie Star of 2018	Life of the Party	Won	
People's Choice Award	2024	The Movie Performance of the Year	The Little Mermaid	Nominated	
Palm Springs Film Festival	2019	Spotlight Award	Can You Ever Forgive Me?	Won	
Satellite Awards	2011	Best Actress: Television Series Musical or Comedy	Mike & Molly	Nominated	
Satellite Awards	2019	Best Actress – Motion Picture	Can You Ever Forgive Me?	Nominated	
Saturn Awards	2023	Best Supporting Actress	The Little Mermaid	Nominated	
Teen Choice Awards	2011	Choice Movie: Scene Stealer	Bridesmaids	Nominated	
Teen Choice Awards	2013	Choice Movie: Chemistry^{[E]}	The Heat	Won	
Teen Choice Awards	2013	Choice Movie: Hissy Fit	The Heat	Nominated	
Teen Choice Awards	2013	Choice Summer Movie Star: Female	The Heat	Nominated	
Teen Choice Awards	2013	Choice Movie Actress: Comedy	Identity Thief	Nominated	
Teen Choice Awards	2013	Choice Movie: Villain	Identity Thief	Nominated	
Teen Choice Awards	2014	Choice Summer Movie Star	Tammy	Nominated	
Teen Choice Awards	2015	Choice Movie: Hissy Fit	Spy	Nominated	
Teen Choice Awards	2015	Choice Summer Movie Star: Female	Spy	Nominated	
Teen Choice Awards	2016	Choice Movie Actress: Comedy	The Boss	Nominated	
Teen Choice Awards	2016	Choice Summer Movie Star: Female	Ghostbusters	Nominated	
Teen Choice Awards	2018	Choice Summer Movie Actress	Life of the Party	Nominated	

== Critics awards ==
Awards and nominations received by Melissa McCarthy
Award	Year	Category	Nominated work	Result	Ref.
Alliance of Women Film Journalists	2011	Best Ensemble Cast	Bridesmaids	Won	
Alliance of Women Film Journalists	2019	Best Actress	Can You Ever Forgive Me?	Nominated	
Alliance of Women Film Journalists	2019	Bravest Performance	Can You Ever Forgive Me?	Nominated	
Boston Society of Film Critics	2011	Best Supporting Actress	Bridesmaids	Won	
Boston Society of Film Critics	2018	Best Actress	Can You Ever Forgive Me?	Won	
Central Ohio Film Critics Association	2012	Best Supporting Actress	Bridesmaids	Nominated	
Central Ohio Film Critics Association	2012	Best Ensemble	Bridesmaids	Nominated	
Chicago Film Critics Association	2011	Best Supporting Actress	Bridesmaids	Nominated	
Chicago Film Critics Association	2018	Best Actress	Can You Ever Forgive Me?	Nominated	
Dallas-Fort Worth Film Critics Association	2011	Best Supporting Actress	Bridesmaids	Nominated	
Dallas-Fort Worth Film Critics Association	2018	Best Actress	Can You Ever Forgive Me?	Nominated	
Denver Film Critics Society	2011	Best Supporting Actress	Bridesmaids	Nominated	
Detroit Film Critics Society	2011	Breakthrough Performance	Bridesmaids	Nominated	
Detroit Film Critics Society	2018	Best Actress	Can You Ever Forgive Me?	Nominated	
Houston Film Critics Society	2011	Best Supporting Actress	Bridesmaids	Nominated	
Houston Film Critics Society	2019	Best Actress	Can You Ever Forgive Me?	Nominated	
Indiana Film Journalists Association	2014	Best Supporting Actress	St. Vincent	Runner-Up	
Iowa Film Critics	2011	Best Supporting Actress	Bridesmaids	Won	
Las Vegas Film Critics Society	2011	Best Supporting Actress	Bridesmaids	Won	
New York Film Critics Online Awards	2011	Best Supporting Actress	Bridesmaids	Won	
New York Film Critics Online Awards	2011	Best Ensemble	Bridesmaids	Won	
New York Film Critics Online Awards	2018	Best Actress	Can You Ever Forgive Me?	Won	
Online Film Critics Society Award	2011	Best Supporting Actress	Bridesmaids	Nominated	
Phoenix Film Critics Society	2011	Best Ensemble Acting	Bridesmaids	Nominated	
Phoenix Film Critics Society	2018	Best Actress	Can You Ever Forgive Me?	Won	
San Diego Film Critics Society	2018	Best Female Actor	Can You Ever Forgive Me?	Runner-up	
San Francisco Film Critics Circle	2018	Best Actress	Can You Ever Forgive Me?	Won	
Santa Barbara International Film Festival	2012	Virtuoso Award	Bridesmaids	Won	
Santa Barbara International Film Festival	2019	Montecito Award	Can You Ever Forgive Me?	Won	
Toronto Film Critics Association	2018	Best Actress	Can You Ever Forgive Me?	Nominated	
Vancouver Film Critics Circle Award	2012	Best Supporting Actress	Bridesmaids	Nominated	
Vancouver Film Critics Circle Award	2018	Best Actress	Can You Ever Forgive Me?	Won^{1}	
Washington D.C. Area Film Critics Association	2011	Best Supporting Actress	Bridesmaids	Nominated	
Washington D.C. Area Film Critics Association	2011	Best Ensemble	Bridesmaids	Won	
Washington D.C. Area Film Critics Association	2018	Best Actress	Can You Ever Forgive Me?	Nominated	
Women Film Critics Circle	2011	Best Comedic Actress	Bridesmaids	Won	
Women Film Critics Circle	2013	Best Comedic Actress	The Heat	Won	
Women Film Critics Circle	2015	Best Comedic Actress	Spy	Nominated	
Women Film Critics Circle	2016	Best Female Action Hero^{[F]}	Ghostbusters	Won	
Women Film Critics Circle	2018	Courage in Acting	Can You Ever Forgive Me?	Nominated	
Women Film Critics Circle	2018	Best Comedic Actress	Can You Ever Forgive Me?	Nominated	

== Honors and achievements ==
Organizations	Year	Award	Result	Ref.
Elle Magazine	2013	Woman of The Year	Honored	
CinemaCon Award	2014	Female Star of the Year	Honored	
Hollywood Walk of Fame	2015	Motion Picture - Star	Honored	
MTV Movie Awards	2016	Comedic Genius Award	Honored	
Time Magazine	2016	100 most influential people in the world	Honored	
Santa Barbara International Film Festival	2019	Montecito Award	Honored	
The New York Times	2020	Ranked her #22 in its list of the 25 Greatest Actors of the 21st Century	Honored	
