= Breakthrough (soundtrack) =

2019 soundtrack albums

Breakthrough (Music from and Inspired by the Motion Picture)

Soundtrack album by various artists
- Released: April 5, 2019
- Genres: Contemporary Christian music; Christian pop; Christian rock
- Length: 38:39
- Labels: Mercury Nashville; Fox Music

Breakthrough (Original Motion Picture Score)

Film score by Marcelo Zarvos
- Released: April 17, 2019
- Genre: Film score
- Length: 51:32
- Label: Fox Music
- Producer: Marcelo Zarvos

Marcelo Zarvos chronology
The Best of Enemies (2019)	Breakthrough (2019)	Otherhood (2019)

Breakthrough is a 2019 American Christian medical drama film directed by Roxann Dawson. Two soundtracks were released in order to promote Breakthrough: Breakthrough (Music from and Inspired by the Motion Picture) featuring the original, pre-existing and songs specially used or inspired by the film, was released through Mercury Records and Fox Music on April 5, 2019. Breakthrough (Original Motion Picture Score) featuring the original score composed by Marcelo Zarvos was released through Fox Music, on April 17, that coincided the film's release.

== Background ==
The original score for Breakthrough is composed by Marcelo Zarvos. Zarvos added that some of his favorite scores had inspired from spiritual elements and when he received the opportunity to score the film, he eventually took that. He further added that their conversations with Dawson had brought insights about the use of cello, which they liked it, because it can provide depth and expressiveness, and used a particular sound which was the "frozen cello" that portrayed the lake waters where John's accident takes place, and the moments where miracles or unexpected events would occur. Dawson further stated that Zarvos completely understood the dynamics and heart of the scenes also knowing where to support the emotion and allowing to have a breathing space for the scenes.

Cindy Mabe, the president of Universal Music Group Nashville watched a screening of the film, and "was so moved and inspired by the film and the storyline that I wanted to help give it a bigger voice" further adding that their artists would "bring inspiration and purpose through their music as an extension of this film". She then discussed with the executives of Fox and producer DeVon Franklin regarding the idea of a soundtrack, which they liked it. An assortment of country musicians ranging from popular artists such as Carrie Underwood and Darius Rucker to low-profile names like Mickey Guyton and Adam Hambrick, who added that they were immediately struck with the inspiration to record the songs.

Guyton said that prior to recording "Hold On"—co-written with Karen Kosowski and Victoria Banks—she suffered from a medical emergency because of an allergic reaction and was entirely sick for a day, even though the song was written and recorded within 30 minutes, considering the allergy as a "godsend" as the song was for a faith-based film and had god played a part in it. Hambrick added that he wrote "Looking Out for Me" at the middle of a snowstorm in Minneapolis and completed it by that afternoon, while he recorded the song with Andrew Roberts within two days and mixed and mastered it within five days.

Chrissy Metz, who starred in the film also served as a singer, and Franklin offered her to contribute a song for the soundtrack, which she considered it to be "a dream come true" moment. The song "I'm Standing with You" opened the soundtrack, which she co-wrote it with Diane Warren, owing to her taking the singing and songwriting stint after her big break came with This Is Us and she enjoyed that experience on recording the album. Underwood's "Love Wins" which she recorded for her sixth studio album Cry Pretty (2018) is featured in this film. The album featured a mix of Phil Wickham's "This Is Amazing Grace" featuring rap portions by Lecrae and "Oceans (Where Feet May Fail)" performed by Taylor Mosby and Kirk Franklin.

== Track listing ==
=== Breakthrough (Music from and Inspired by the Motion Picture) ===
No.	Title	Artist(s)	Length
1.	"I'm Standing with You"	Chrissy Metz	4:05
2.	"Hold On"	Mickey Guyton	3:13
3.	"Love Wins"	Carrie Underwood	3:48
4.	"Breathe Again"	Lauren Alaina	3:19
5.	"Big Old Shoulders"	Darius Rucker	4:16
6.	"Colorful"	Jukebox the Ghost	3:11
7.	"Play It Again"	Pigeon John	3:15
8.	"Looking Out for Me"	Adam Hambrick	3:13
9.	"People Need People"	Maddie & Tae	3:17
10.	"This Is Amazing Grace (Breakthrough Mix)"	Phil Wickham feat. Lecrae	2:37
11.	"Oceans (Where Feet May Fail)"	Taylor Mosby feat. Kirk Franklin	4:25
Total length:			38:39

=== Breakthrough (Original Motion Picture Score) ===
No.	Title	Length
1.	"Opening"	2:30
2.	"Homeroom"	1:22
3.	"Bless This Food"	2:46
4.	"Breathe Life Into John"	4:28
5.	"Doctor Garrett"	2:40
6.	"Tommy and John"	1:58
7.	"Frozen Waters / Miracle at the Lake"	7:41
8.	"Squeeze My Hand"	3:37
9.	"Let God Handle It"	3:43
10.	"John's Fight"	2:30
11.	"Hearing Voices"	1:44
12.	"To the Hospital"	1:06
13.	"Some Kind of Miracle"	3:23
14.	"I Didn't Ask for This"	4:04
15.	"He Gave Us a Rose"	1:27
16.	"Belief"	4:03
17.	"Stand for John"	2:30
Total length:		51:32

== Reception ==
Yolanda Machado of TheWrap wrote that "Music director Marcelo Zarvos' score is one of the only things that works in the film."

== Accolades ==
Awards Ceremony	Category	Recipient(s)	Result	References
Academy Awards	Best Original Song	"I'm Standing with You"	Nominated	
Critics' Choice Movie Awards	Best Song	"I'm Standing with You"	Nominated	
