= God's Favorite Idiot =

American sitcom

- Genre: Apocalyptic; Workplace comedy
- Created by: Ben Falcone
- Starring: Ben Falcone; Melissa McCarthy; Leslie Bibb; Kevin Dunn
- Composer: Fil Eisler
- Country of origin: United States
- Original language: English
- No. of seasons: 1
- No. of episodes: 8

Production
- Executive producers: Ben Falcone; Melissa McCarthy; Michael McDonald; Steve Mallory
- Production location: New South Wales
- Production company: On the Day Productions

Original release
- Network: Netflix
- Release: June 15, 2022

God's Favorite Idiot is an American apocalyptic workplace comedy television series created by and starring Ben Falcone for Netflix. The series was supposed to consist of sixteen episodes, and the first batch of eight episodes premiered on June 15, 2022. As of June 2025, the production of the remaining eight episodes is in limbo.

== Plot ==
After getting struck by lightning from an unusual angelic cloud, Clark suddenly has the ability to glow. His co-workers, including his friend Amily, believe that this may somehow be related to God. Their fears are confirmed when an angel tells Clark that he is to be God's messenger and must prevent the Apocalypse from happening.

== Cast and characters ==
- Ben Falcone as Clark Thompson
- Melissa McCarthy as Amily Luck (one of Clark's co-workers)
- Leslie Bibb as Satan: The Biblical demonic entity looking to upset the cosmic balance between good and evil.
- Kevin Dunn as Gene: Clark's father who committed himself after his divorce to raise his son.
- Yanic Truesdale as Chamuel
- Usman Ally as Mohsin Raza (another co-worker)
- Ana Scotney as Wendy (another co-worker)
- Chris Sandiford as Tom (another co-worker)
- Steve Mallory as Frisbee, a low-level middle manager lacking any authority.
- Georgie Bolton as Judy McGill (a news reporter)
- Michael McDonald as Lucifer
- Magda Szubanski as Bathroom God
- Suraj Kolarkar as Steve the Ogre
- Jordan Schulte as News Reporter
- Leon Ford as Reverend Milton Throp
- Rahel Romahn as Pestilence

== Episodes ==
No.	Title	Directed by	Written by	Original release date
1	"B-Minus"	Michael McDonald	Ben Falcone	June 15, 2022
2	"The Angel"	Michael McDonald	Ben Falcone	June 15, 2022
3	"The Preacher"	Michael McDonald	Ben Falcone	June 15, 2022
4	"God, Satan and All the Good Smells"	Michael McDonald	Ben Falcone	June 15, 2022
5	"The Word (It's Love)"	Sheila G. Waldron	Ben Falcone	June 15, 2022
6	"Tom the Baptist"	Sheila G. Waldron	Ben Falcone	June 15, 2022
7	"The Four Horsemen"	Michael McDonald	Ben Falcone	June 15, 2022
8	"Quitters Never Win, But Winners Sometimes Quit"	Michael McDonald	Ben Falcone	June 15, 2022

== Production ==
=== Development ===
In December 2020, Netflix gave a 16-episode series order to God's Favorite Idiot. Ben Falcone and Melissa McCarthy were set to star and executive produce via their On the Day Productions. Michael McDonald would direct and executive produce, after previously working with Falcone and McCarthy on Nobodies. Steve Mallory joined as an executive producer in February 2021.

=== Casting ===
Alongside the series announcement, Ben Falcone and Melissa McCarthy were cast. In February 2021, Yanic Truesdale, Usman Ally, Ana Scotney, Chris Sandiford, and Steve Mallory were cast. Leslie Bibb and Kevin Dunn were cast a month later.

=== Filming ===
Filming began in Byron Bay, Ballina and Lismore in northern New South Wales in March 2021. Filming wrapped in early June 2021 after shooting only eight episodes. The series was expected to wrap production in November 2021. The other batch of eight episodes were slated to shoot on a later date, but no further information has been provided as to when.

=== Music ===
Fil Eisler is the composer for the series.

== Reception ==
On Rotten Tomatoes, the series has an approval rating of 33% with an average rating of 4.6/10 based on 15 critic reviews. The website's critics consensus reads, "While it claims to have the Almighty's favor, this silver screen collaboration between Melissa McCarthy and Ben Falcone is too dunderheaded to win over everyday viewers."

Daniel D'Addario of Variety called it "a waste of precious time in the career of a talented performer, one whose fans will follow her anywhere, and who rewards them with so little of what she can do."
