= Melissa McCarthy =

American actress (born 1970)

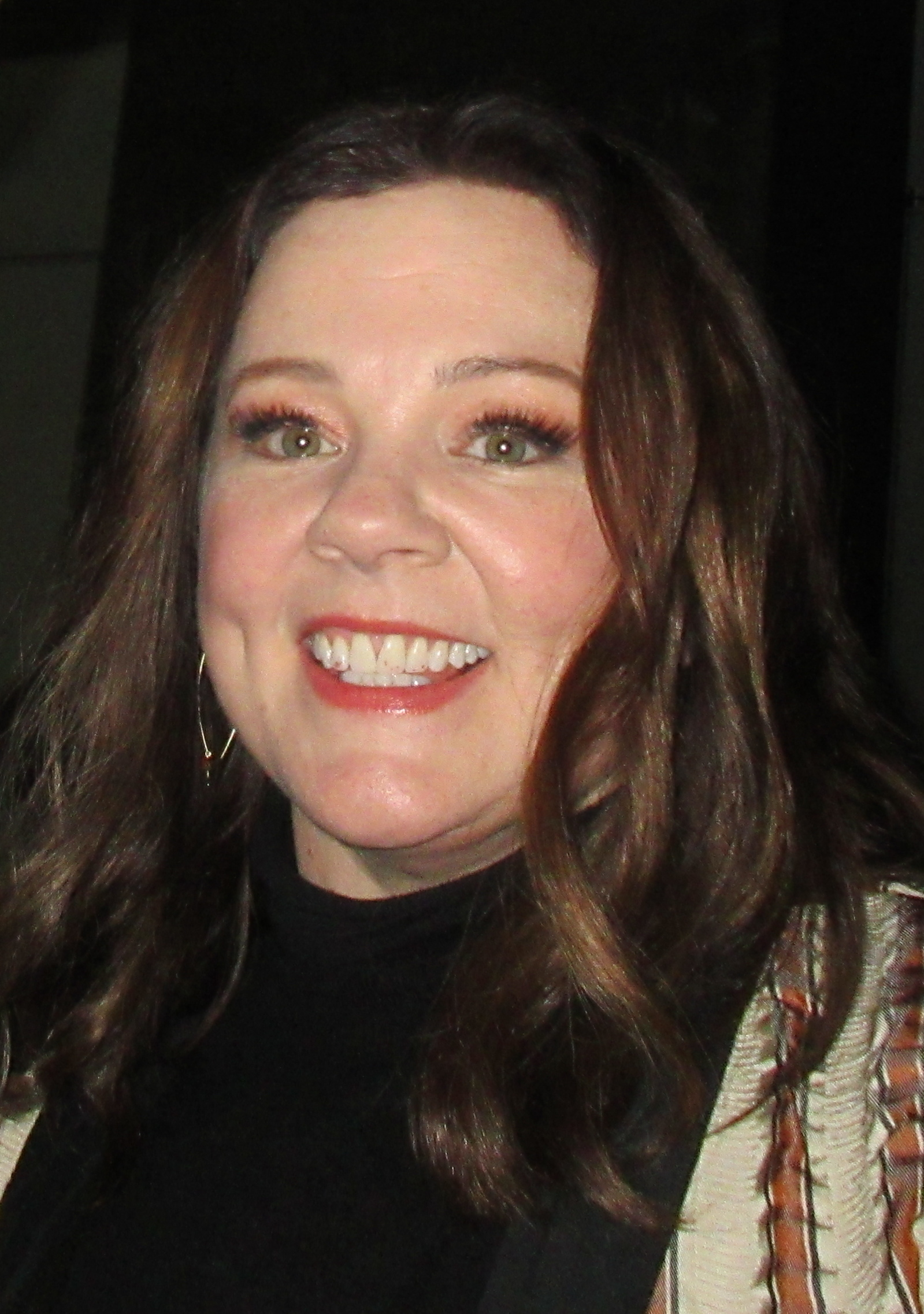
- McCarthy in 2018
- Born: Melissa Ann McCarthy; August 26, 1970 (age 56); Plainfield, Illinois, U.S.
- Occupations: Actress; comedian; screenwriter; producer
- Years active: 1997–present
- Spouse: Ben Falcone (m. 2005)
- Children: 2
- Relatives: Jenny McCarthy (cousin); Joanne McCarthy (cousin)
- Awards: Full list

Melissa Ann McCarthy (born August 26, 1970) is an American actress, comedian, and producer. She is the recipient of numerous accolades, including two Primetime Emmy Awards, and nominations for two Academy Awards and two Golden Globe Awards. McCarthy was named by Time as one of the 100 most influential people in the world in 2016, and she has been featured multiple times in annual rankings of the highest-paid actresses in the world. In 2020, The New York Times ranked her #22 in its list of the 25 Greatest Actors of the 21st Century.

McCarthy has received two Primetime Emmy Awards, her first for Outstanding Lead Actress in a Comedy Series for playing Molly Flynn on the CBS sitcom Mike & Molly (2010–2016) followed by her win for Outstanding Guest Actress in a Comedy Series for hosting Saturday Night Live (2017). She has also taken supporting roles in the comedy-drama series Gilmore Girls (2000–2007) and the sitcom Samantha Who? (2007–2009), a leading role in the miniseries Nine Perfect Strangers (2021), and a guest role in the comedy series Only Murders in the Building (2024).

On film, she has received two Academy Award nominations for Best Supporting Actress playing a comedic bridesmaid in the comedy Bridesmaids (2011) and Best Actress for her portrayal of writer Lee Israel in the biographical film Can You Ever Forgive Me? (2018). She has also starred in a string of commercially successful comedies such as Identity Thief (2013), The Heat (2013), Tammy (2014), St. Vincent (2014), Spy (2015), The Boss (2016), Ghostbusters (2016) and Life of the Party (2018). She played Ursula in the musical fantasy film The Little Mermaid (2023).

McCarthy and her husband Ben Falcone are the founders of the production company On the Day Productions, under which they have collaborated on several comedy films including Super Intelligence (2020), and Thunder Force (2021). In 2015, she launched her own clothing line for plus-sized women, named Melissa McCarthy Seven7, and she received a motion picture star on the Hollywood Walk of Fame.

== Early life and education ==
McCarthy was born on August 26, 1970, in Plainfield, Illinois, a suburb of Chicago. Her parents are Sandra and Michael McCarthy. She is a cousin of actress and model Jenny McCarthy. McCarthy was raised on a farm in a Catholic family. She is of mostly Irish descent, although she also has some German and English ancestry. Some of her forebears were from County Cork. She graduated from St. Francis Academy (now Joliet Catholic Academy) in Joliet, Illinois, and attended Southern Illinois University Carbondale.

Her career started with stand-up comedy in Los Angeles, and later in New York City. McCarthy is an alumna of The Groundlings, an improvisational and sketch comedy troupe based in Los Angeles, California. She also performed in New York City as a drag queen under the moniker Miss Y, including at the Wigstock festival.

== Career ==
=== 1997–2010: Early work and Gilmore Girls ===
McCarthy made her first television appearance in an episode of the NBC comedy series Jenny, opposite her cousin Jenny McCarthy. She made her feature film debut in a minor role in the 1999 comedy Go, and later had roles in the films Drowning Mona, Disney's The Kid, Charlie's Angels, Charlie's Angels: Full Throttle, The Third Wheel and The Life of David Gale. She also worked in three episodes of Kim Possible, voicing DNAmy. In 2000, McCarthy was cast as Sookie St. James, the upbeat and klutzy best friend of Lorelai Gilmore, on The WB television series Gilmore Girls. Throughout the series, Sookie is Lorelai's business partner and cheerleader. On April 7, 2016, McCarthy announced on The Ellen DeGeneres Show that she would be returning for the show's revival, Gilmore Girls: A Year in the Life, on Netflix. The series was released November 25, 2016 and McCarthy appeared in one of its four episodes.

In 2007, she starred opposite Ryan Reynolds in the science fantasy psychological thriller The Nines, written and directed by John August. She later starred in the independent comedies The Captain, Just Add Water, and Pretty Ugly People. Also in 2007, McCarthy starred as Dena Stevens on the ABC sitcom Samantha Who? McCarthy played Samantha's socially awkward childhood best friend, whom Samantha hasn't seen since seventh grade. When Samantha wakes from her coma, Dena convinces Samantha that they have always been best friends. While Andrea eventually forces her to reveal the truth, Samantha still remains friends with Dena. She guest starred in Rita Rocks and Private Practice. In 2010, McCarthy played supporting roles in films The Back-up Plan and Life as We Know It.

=== 2011–2017: Sitcom and film stardom ===
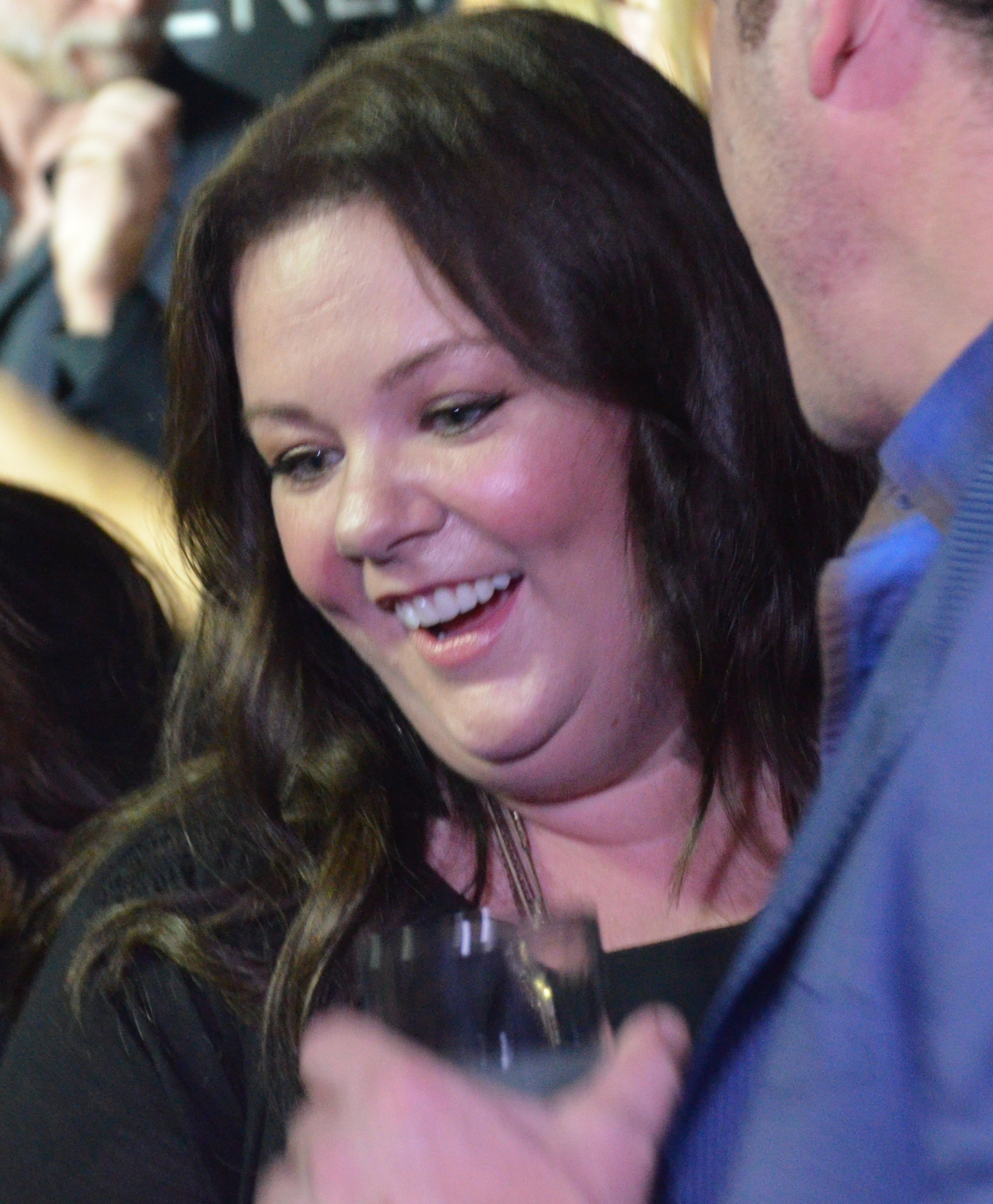
McCarthy in 2012

In 2010, McCarthy was cast in a leading role on the CBS sitcom Mike & Molly. Television critic Lucy Mangan from the Guardian commended McCarthy and her co-star Billy Gardell on some “unfeasibly delicate and charming work”, while decrying the show itself for hanging every one of its gags on the subject of their weight. In 2011, McCarthy had a breakout performance in the comedy film Bridesmaids alongside Kristen Wiig, Maya Rudolph, Rose Byrne, Wendi McLendon-Covey and Ellie Kemper. She received wide critical acclaim and press coverage for her performance. McCarthy received an Academy Award nomination for Best Supporting Actress for her performance. She received BAFTA, Critics' Choice and Screen Actors Guild Awards nominations, as well as won Boston Society of Film Critics Award, New York Film Critics Online Award for Best Supporting Actress, Women Film Critics Circle Award for Best Comedic Actress, and MTV Movie Award for Best Comedic Performance. One of McCarthy's most memorable scenes in Bridesmaids was improvised, according to director Paul Feig. In fall 2011, after achieving fame from Bridesmaids, she received her first Primetime Emmy Award for Outstanding Lead Actress in a Comedy Series for her role on Mike & Molly.

In June 2011, she hosted the Women in Film Crystal + Lucy Awards. She was invited to join the Academy of Motion Picture Arts and Sciences in June 2012 along with 175 others. McCarthy hosted Saturday Night Live on October 1, 2011, April 6, 2013, February 1, 2014, February 13, 2016, May 12, 2017 and December 6, 2025. She was nominated five times for a Primetime Emmy Award for Outstanding Guest Actress in a Comedy Series for her appearances on the television show from 2011 to 2017, winning in 2017. In 2011, McCarthy produced a CBS pilot which starred her husband, Ben Falcone. After her Bridesmaids breakout, McCarthy had supporting roles in the comedy films This Is 40 (2012), the spinoff to Judd Apatow's film Knocked Up, and The Hangover Part III (2013).

In 2013, McCarthy co-starred in the crime comedy Identity Thief with Jason Bateman. Identity Thief, her star vehicle, opened at No. 1 at the box office, and grossed $174 million worldwide despite negative reviews. R. Kurt Osenlund of Slant Magazine praised McCarthy's performance, writing that she "gives a performance leagues better than anything to be expected in a mainstream, early-in-the-year release, padding a typically sketched character with layers of hilarity and pathos. McCarthy owns 'Identity Thief' with a turn of limitless surprise, making an otherwise adequate comedy soar as a star vehicle. She is riveting in simply-penned moments of remorse and confession, adding tearful depth to her ace timing and formidable physical comedy." Peter Debruge of Variety magazine praised McCarthy but criticized the script, saying "Melissa McCarthy proves she’s got what it takes to carry a feature, however meager the underlying material." She received People's Choice and MTV Movie Awards nomination for her performance. Later in 2013, McCarthy co-starred with Sandra Bullock in the buddy cop comedy The Heat. The film was released in the United States and Canada on June 28, 2013, to both critical and commercial success. With McCarthy being called "box office gold," The Heat grossed $229 million worldwide. She won American Comedy Award for Best Comedy Actress - Film, and well as received nominations an Critics' Choice Movie Award for Best Actress in a Comedy and MTV Movie Award for Best Comedic Performance.

In 2013, McCarthy founded the production company On the Day Productions with her husband Ben Falcone. Tammy was the company's first project. The film cost $20 million. McCarthy co-wrote the script for the road comedy film, which was released in 2014. McCarthy's character loses her job and her car, and then learns that her husband has been unfaithful. To get away, she is forced to rely on her alcoholic grandmother (Susan Sarandon) for transportation as they embark on a journey of self-discovery. Although a box office success, grossing over $100 million from a $20 million budget, it received highly negative reviews from critics with McCarthy received Razzie nomination for Worst Actress. On Rotten Tomatoes, the site's critical consensus reads, "Melissa McCarthy remains an engaging screen presence, but her efforts aren't enough to keep the jumbled Tammy on track." Later in 2014, McCarthy played the female lead, opposite Bill Murray, in the comedy-drama film St. Vincent, directed and written by Theodore Melfi. The film received positive reviews from critics and her performance as an overworked single mom was noted. At the 20th Critics' Choice Awards, she received Best Actress in a Comedy Movie nomination.

In May 2015, McCarthy received a star on the Hollywood Walk of Fame. In August 2015, Forbes ranked her as the third highest-paid actress of 2015, with earnings of $23 million. Also in 2015, McCarthy played the lead in frequent collaborator Paul Feig's spy comedy Spy, a role that earned McCarthy her first Golden Globe Award nomination for Best Actress in a Motion Picture – Musical or Comedy. The film received positive reviews from critics and grossed $235 million worldwide against a $65 million budget. McCarthy's performance was praised by critics. Richard Roeper of The Chicago Sun Times called her "as funny and as winning as anyone in the movies these days". Tom Russo of The Boston Globe credited the film's success to McCarthy, writing, "part of what makes the action comedy such a loopy blast is the identity shifts she pulls on the audience." Bill Goodykoontz of Arizona Republic called the film McCarthy's return to form, writing "Finally, after the promise shown in Bridesmaids, but sold short since by weak scripts in films like Tammy and Identity Thief, Melissa McCarthy gets a movie vehicle worthy of her talents."

In 2016, McCarthy starred in the comedy film The Boss, a film based on a character which McCarthy had created in the Los Angeles Groundlings – a wealthy businesswoman "who goes to jail for insider trading, and struggles to reinvent herself as America's new sweetheart when she's released". Although it received generally negative reviews from critics, it grossed over $78 million worldwide on a budget of $29 million. Also that year, she played an author and scientist in the all-female reboot of Ghostbusters, directed by Paul Feig. The film grossed $229.1 million worldwide against its $144 million budget, making it a box office bomb with losses of over $70 million following theaters taking their revenue cut. At the 43rd People's Choice Awards, McCarthy won Award for Favorite Comedic Movie Actress.

In 2016, she recorded the song "Anything You Can Do (I Can Do Better)" with Barbra Streisand which appears on Streisand's album Encore: Movie Partners Sing Broadway. On February 4 and 11, 2017 she made surprise appearances on Saturday Night Live portraying White House Press Secretary Sean Spicer. She returned to the show to portray Spicer on April 16 and May 13, 2017 (also hosting the latter). McCarthy also appeared in a Super Bowl LI ad for Kia Motors, promoting the Kia Niro. McCarthy played a wannabe environmentalist, who has a series of mishaps befall her such as being capsized by a whale, being charged by a rhino, and falling down a crevasse. The commercial featured the song "Holding Out for a Hero".

=== 2018–present: Dramatic roles and expansion ===
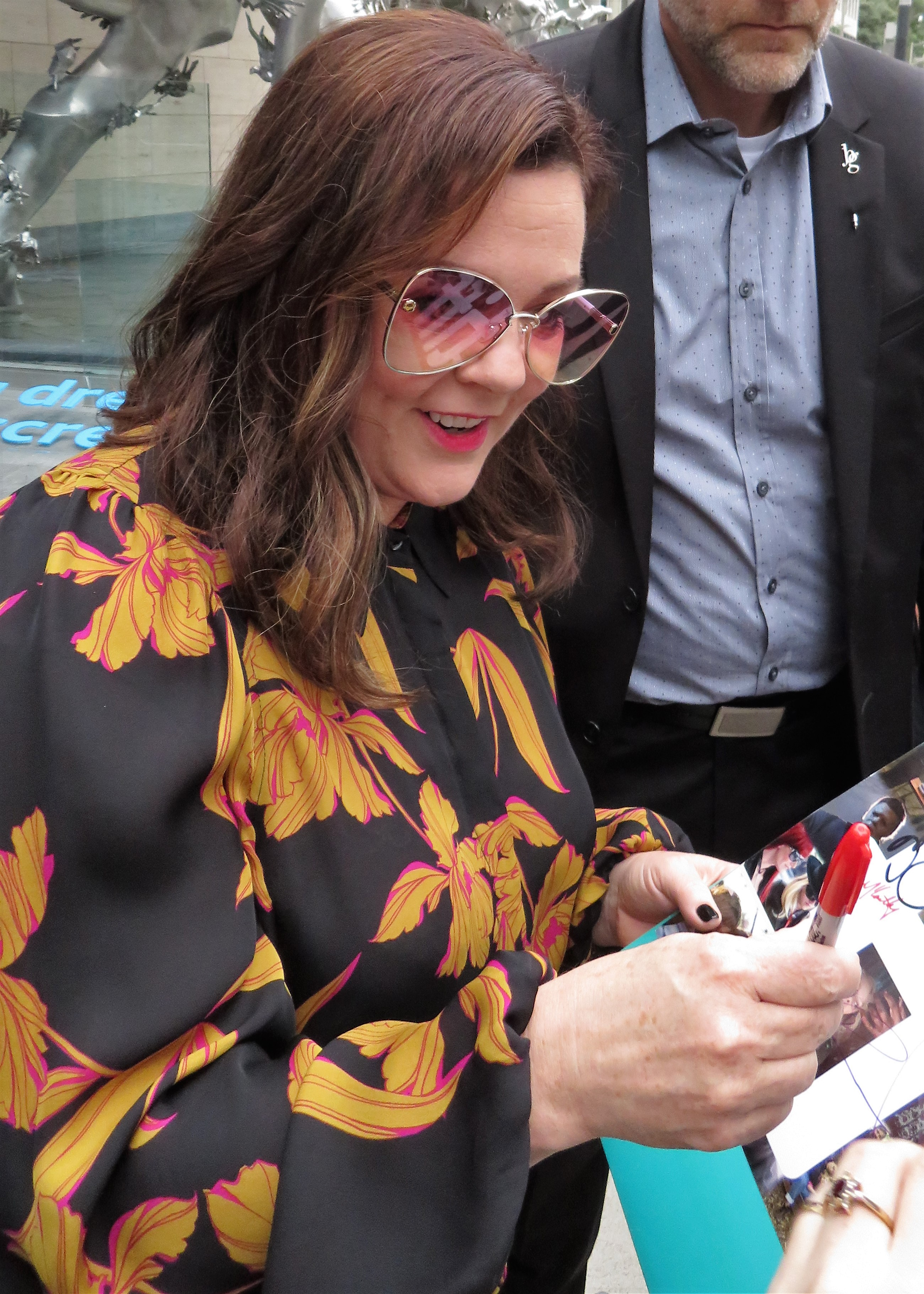
McCarthy at an event for Can You Ever Forgive Me? in 2018

McCarthy starred and produced another comedy film directed by Ben Falcone, Life of the Party. The film was released on May 11, 2018. It received mixed reviews from critics and grossed $65 million. She also starred in The Happytime Murders, an adult puppet buddy cop crime comedy film directed by Brian Henson. The film was released on August 24, 2018, and received mostly negative reviews and was a box-office bomb, grossing $27.5 million worldwide against a $40–47 million budget. It went on to debut to $9.5 million, marking the lowest opening of McCarthy's career as a lead.

Later in 2018, she starred as celebrity biographer Lee Israel in the dark comedy-drama film Can You Ever Forgive Me? directed by Marielle Heller. She replaced Julianne Moore, who was fired shortly before shooting was to begin. McCarthy's performance as Lee drew high praise. Film Journal International said McCarthy's performance is "stunning", and her previous film roles "could not anticipate how fearlessly and credibly she inhabits Lee Israel."

She received an Academy Award for Best Actress nomination, and well as Golden Globe, Critics' Choice, Screen Actors Guild Awards and BAFTA Awards nominations. She won Best Actress awards from New York Film Critics Online, San Francisco Bay Area Film Critics Circle, Boston Society of Film Critics, Vancouver Film Critics Circle and Florida Film Critics Circle. At the 39th Golden Raspberry Awards, McCarthy won two awards: for Worst Actress (Life of the Party and The Happytime Murders) and Redeemer Award for her Can You Ever Forgive Me? performance.

In 2019, McCarthy played the lead in the crime film The Kitchen. It received mostly negative reviews from critics and was a box-office bomb. Variety's Owen Gleiberman described the film as "just like Widows, except not as good." Gleiberman was critical of the script but praised McCarthy's fierce performance. The following year, she returned to comedy with the leading role in the Superintelligence. In 2021, she starred in the superhero comedy film Thunder Force, and the comedy-drama film The Starling; both were released on Netflix.

She executive produced and starred in the Hulu limited thriller drama series, Nine Perfect Strangers. The Guardian's Lucy Mangan said: "Most engagingly, there is Melissa McCarthy, sweeping all before her as charismatic, bestselling author Frances, who has recently been dealt harsh blows and is here to have pampered time to recover. As is so often the case with the magnificent McCarthy, she is the best, most arresting thing in the series, and every time she comes back on screen you wriggle with delight." She received Critics' Choice Television Award nomination for Best Supporting Actress in a Movie/Miniseries for her performance in series. In 2022, she co-starred with Ben Falcone in the Netflix comedy series, God's Favorite Idiot.

On June 28, 2019, it was announced that McCarthy was in talks to play Ursula in Disney's film The Little Mermaid, set to be directed by Rob Marshall. On February 18, 2020, McCarthy confirmed her casting as the villainess during an interview on The Ellen DeGeneres Show. The film was released in 2023 and grossed over $569 million worldwide against a total production budget of $250 million. Peter Debruge from the Variety wrote: "If Bailey is the film’s big discovery, then McCarthy is its no-brainer. Dolled up to look like Divine’s evil-stepsister in her glowing green lair, the comic star’s just delicious as the movie’s deep-sea villain. Her timing is impeccable, and though the part is virtually identical to the one Pat Carroll originated, she aces what’s demanded of these tricky remakes: Basically, McCarthy manages to hit every beat the super fans expect, while surprising with every pause and inflection."

McCarthy starred in the film Genie written by Richard Curtis. She also starred opposite Jerry Seinfeld in the comedy film Unfrosted for Netflix.

== Personal life ==
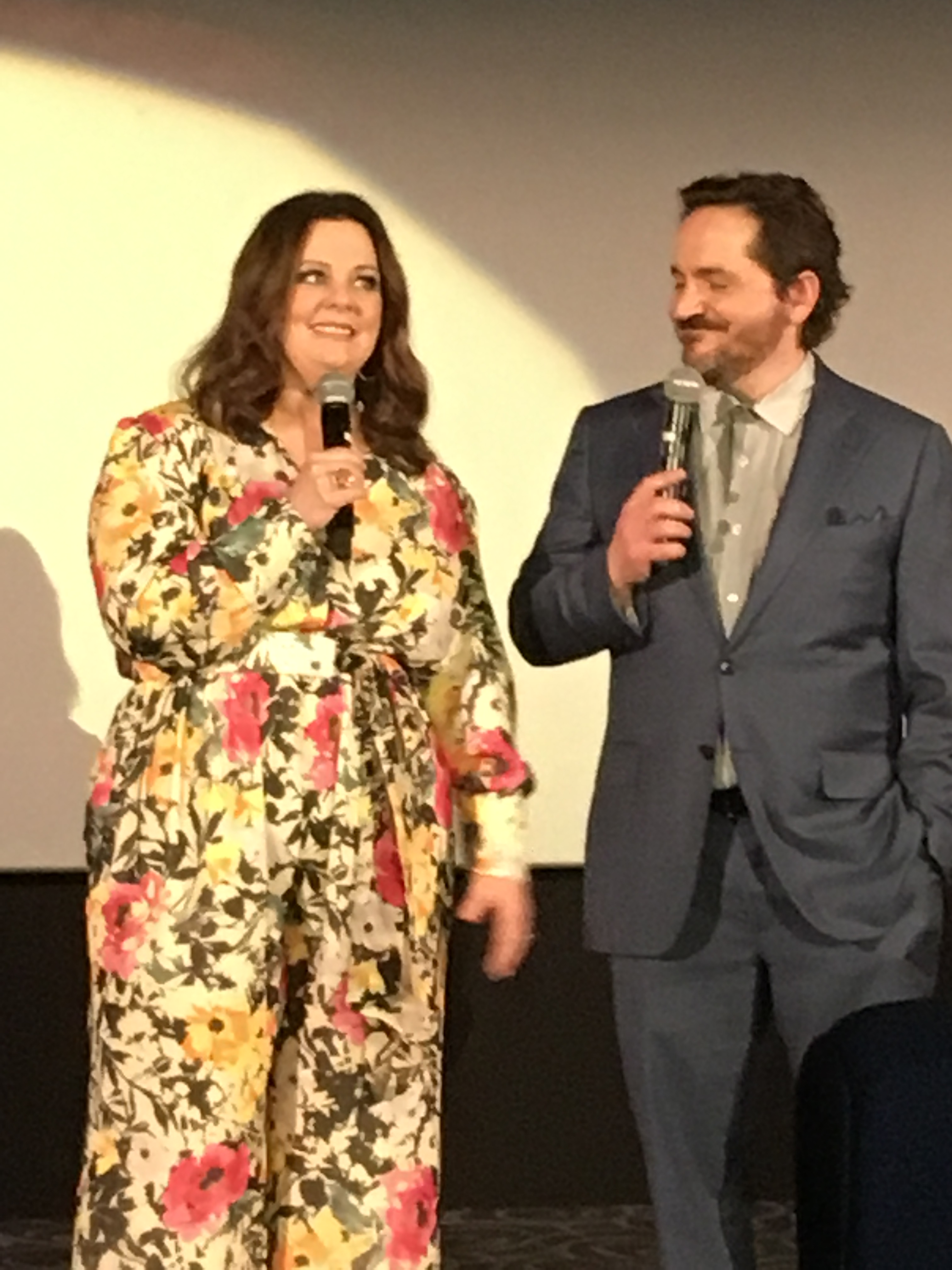
McCarthy and Ben Falcone at The Boss premiere in 2016

McCarthy married her longtime boyfriend Ben Falcone, an actor and member of The Groundlings, on October 8, 2005. The couple have two daughters. McCarthy's pregnancy was written into the last season of Gilmore Girls.

In the April 2021 issue of Instyle, McCarthy said that, with regard to politics, "It's very polarizing, but, I mean, I'm on the left for sure, though I'm not an extremist. And I think just saying like, "Can't we all just be kind to each other?" and that gets a "F— you, lady," I don't know what to do."

In August 2021, McCarthy joined the 40x40 campaign launched by Meghan Markle to mark her 40th birthday. 40x40 is a campaign that asks people around the world to spend 40 minutes of their time mentoring women reentering the workforce and combating the outsized economic impact of the COVID-19 pandemic on women.

== Fashion line ==
McCarthy studied textiles at Southern Illinois University and was interested in a fashion career before she pursued her interests in acting. When she moved to New York City, it was to attend the Fashion Institute of Technology. One of her closest friends is the shoe designer Brian Atwood. McCarthy also spent time working as a costumer for a dance company.

In 2015, McCarthy announced her first clothing collection, Melissa McCarthy Seven7, for plus-size women. The line includes clothes up to size 28. In an interview with More, McCarthy stated that "people don't stop at size 12. I feel like there's a big thing missing where you can't dress to your mood above a certain number. Malls segregate "plus-size" clothes stores and hide these stores away from other sections of the mall." Seven7, which was developed alongside Sunrise Brands, debuted in August 2015 on the Home Shopping Network.

== Filmography ==
=== Film ===
Year	Film	Role	Notes
1998	God	Margaret	Short film
1999	Go	Sandra	
2000	Charlie's Angels	Doris	
2000	Drowning Mona	Shirley	
2000	Auto Motives	Tonnie	Short film
2000	Disney's The Kid	Sky King Waitress	
2002	Pumpkin	Cici Pinkus	
2002	The Third Wheel	Marilyn	
2002	White Oleander	Paramedic	
2003	The Life of David Gale	Nico the Goth Girl	
2003	Chicken Party	Tot Wagner	
2003	Charlie's Angels: Full Throttle	Woman at Crime Scene	Uncredited
2007	Cook Off!	Amber Strang	
2007	The Nines	Margaret / Melissa / Mary	
2007	The Captain	Fran	Short film
2008	Just Add Water	Selma	
2008	Pretty Ugly People	Becky	
2010	The Back-up Plan	Carol	
2010	Life as We Know It	DeeDee	
2011	Bridesmaids	Megan Price	
2012	This Is 40	Catherine	
2013	Identity Thief	Diana / Dawn Budgie	
2013	The Hangover Part III	Cassy	
2013	The Heat	Detective Shannon Mullins	
2014	Tammy	Tammy Banks	Also screenwriter and producer
2014	St. Vincent	Maggie Bronstein	
2015	Spy	Susan Cooper	
2016	The Boss	Michelle Darnell	Also screenwriter and producer
2016	Central Intelligence	Darla McGuckian	Cameo(uncredited)
2016	Ghostbusters	Dr. Abigail "Abby" Yates	
2018	Life of the Party	Deanna Miles	Also screenwriter and producer
2018	The Happytime Murders	Detective Connie Edwards	Also producer
2018	Can You Ever Forgive Me?	Leonore "Lee" Israel	
2019	The Kitchen	Kathy Brennan	
2020	Superintelligence	Carol Vivian Peters	Also producer
2021	Thunder Force	Lydia Berman / The Hammer	Also producer
2021	The Starling	Lilly Maynard	
2022	Thor: Love and Thunder	Hela actress	Cameo
2023	The Little Mermaid	Ursula	
2023	Genie	Flora	Also executive producer
2024	Unfrosted	Donna Stankowski	
2027	Margie Claus	Margie Claus	Voice; also producer

=== Television ===
Year	Title	Role	Notes
1997	Jenny	Melissa	Episode: "A Girl's Gotta Live in the Real World"
2000	D.C.	Molly	2 episodes
2000–2007	Gilmore Girls	Sookie St. James	153 episodes
2002–2005	Kim Possible	Amy Hall "DNAmy"	Voice, 3 episodes
2004	Curb Your Enthusiasm	Saleswoman	Episode: "The Surrogate"
2006	I Love the '70s: Volume 2	Herself	Documentary miniseries
2007–2009	Samantha Who?	Dena	35 episodes
2009	Rita Rocks	Mindy Boone	5 episodes
2010	Private Practice	Lynn McDonald	Episode: "Best Laid Plans"
2010–2016	Mike & Molly	Molly Flynn	127 episodes
2011–2025	Saturday Night Live	Herself (host) / various	6 episodes as host, 5 episodes as guest
2012	The Penguins of Madagascar	Shelley	Voice, episode: "Hair Apparent/Love Takes Flightless"
2016	Gilmore Girls: A Year in the Life	Sookie St. James	Episode: "Fall"
2017–2018	Nobodies	Herself	8 episodes; also executive producer
2020	Little Big Shots	Herself (host)	13 episodes; also executive producer
2021	Nine Perfect Strangers	Frances Welty	8 episodes; also executive producer
2022	God's Favorite Idiot	Amily Luck	8 episodes; also executive producer
2022	The Simpsons	Calvin	Voice, episode: "Step Brother from the Same Planet"
2024	RuPaul's Drag Race	Herself	Episode: "The Sound of Rusic"
2024	Only Murders in the Building	Doreen	Episode: "Valley of the Dolls"
2026	Law & Order: Special Victims Unit	Jasmyn Jewell	Episode: "Gimmick"
2026	The Murder of JonBenét Ramsey	Patsy Ramsey	Lead role, Upcoming series

== Awards and nominations ==
Over her career, McCarthy has received two Primetime Emmy Awards (out of 8 nominations) winning the Primetime Emmy Award for Outstanding Lead Actress in a Comedy Series in 2011 for playing Molly Flynn on the CBS sitcom Mike & Molly (2010–2016), and Primetime Emmy Award for Outstanding Guest Actress in a Comedy Series in 2017 for hosting the NBC sketch series Saturday Night Live (2011–2017). She also has earned nominations for two Academy Awards, two BAFTA Awards, two Golden Globe Awards and three Screen Actors Guild Awards.
