= Thunder Force (film) =

American superhero comedy film

- Release poster
- Directed by: Ben Falcone
- Written by: Ben Falcone
- Produced by: Adam Siegel; Marc Platt; Ben Falcone; Melissa McCarthy
- Starring: Melissa McCarthy; Octavia Spencer; Bobby Cannavale; Pom Klementieff; Kevin Dunn; Melissa Leo; Jason Bateman
- Cinematography: Barry Peterson
- Edited by: Tia Nolan
- Music by: Fil Eisler
- Production companies: On the Day Productions; Marc Platt Productions
- Distributed by: Netflix
- Release date: April 9, 2021
- Running time: 106 minutes
- Country: United States
- Language: English

Thunder Force is a 2021 American superhero comedy film written and directed by Ben Falcone, and starring Melissa McCarthy, Octavia Spencer, Bobby Cannavale, Pom Klementieff, Taylor Mosby, with Melissa Leo, and Jason Bateman. It is the fifth collaboration between McCarthy and her husband Falcone, and follows two childhood friends who invent a way to become superheroes in a world where criminals have developed superpowers.

The film was digitally released by Netflix on April 9, 2021. It received generally negative reviews from critics.

== Plot ==
In 1983, Earth was subjected to cosmic rays that gave sociopaths superpowers, resulting in a rise of supervillains known as Miscreants. With no one able to stop the Miscreants, normal people are usually left living in fear of them. After a Miscreant kills her geneticist parents on their way home from work, Emily Stanton becomes determined to find a way to stop Miscreants.

By 1988, Emily has sacrificed much of her social life in favor of researching ways to fight back against Miscreants. While this results in her being bullied, Lydia Berman stands up for her and becomes her best and only friend. Lydia supports Emily's dream of giving superpowers to normal people, though she tries to make sure that Emily does not overwork herself. When Lydia convinces Emily to take a half-hour nap from studying, Emily accidentally oversleeps and wakes up late for an AP exam, straining their relationship and causing them to drift apart.

In 2024, Emily and Lydia have gone their separate ways, with Emily becoming a successful scientist and researcher for her own company and Lydia becoming a longshoreman. Lydia tries to reconnect with Emily when their high school reunion comes around. When she fails to show up on the night of the reunion, Lydia concludes that Emily is still uncomfortable attending parties by herself and goes to pick her up. Emily tells her that while she would have liked to go to the reunion, she had forgotten when the reunion was and had a project she had to work on that night, which Emily wants to show to Lydia. Unfortunately, Lydia accidentally injects herself with a serum Emily had been working on.

Having been injected with the serum, Lydia learns from Emily that the serum was designed to give a normal person superhuman strength and that she would have to undergo special training and treatment so the serum does not kill her. Emily also joins Lydia in the treatment, although a less painful one since Emily took the serum in a pill form to earn the other superpower concocted, invisibility. Lydia discovers that in the years since their high school graduation, Emily had a daughter, Tracy, with one of the researchers, who could not handle the responsibility and left them.

Once they finish their training and treatment, Emily and Lydia foil a liquor store robbery run by a Miscreant with crab arms known as the Crab, who falls in love with an equally smitten Lydia, much to Emily's concern. Emily and Lydia, now known as the superhero team Thunder Force, are praised for their heroics. This brings Thunder Force to the attention of mayoral candidate William Stevens, whose campaign is built on the idea that only he can end the Miscreants' crimes.

With the help of Laser, a Miscreant who can generate and control whip-like energy beams, Stevens tries to get Thunder Force to work for him, leaving Chicago at the mercy of the Miscreants unless he wins the mayoral election. Thunder Force continues to fight crime with their superpowers and support the rival mayoral candidate, thereby causing Stevens to lose the election. Stevens then sends Laser to attack Thunder Force at a diner. When she tries to get away, Lydia throws a bus at her despite Emily's protests. Though nobody is hurt, Emily decides that Lydia's impulsiveness is too dangerous, again straining their friendship.

In an effort to make amends, Lydia goes on a date with the Crab to get some useful information. From him, Lydia learns that Stevens is planning on blowing up everyone who did not vote for him in the election, along with the new mayor, at a party he's hosting under the guise of celebrating the new mayor. She tells Emily of what she learned and they reconcile.

After fighting off Laser again, Thunder Force go to stop Stevens from bombing the building. When they find the bomb, Stevens decides to fight Thunder Force himself, revealing himself to be a Miscreant with superhuman strength, significantly stronger than Lydia. Before Stevens can kill Lydia, the Crab double crosses Stevens and gets his claws broken off. Tracy also joins the fight, having injected herself with her mother's serum, giving her the ability to run at superhuman speed. Though they manage to defeat Stevens, Thunder Force realizes that the bomb will go off before they can disarm it.

With no guarantee that the bomb would be stable enough to not go off while Tracy carries the bomb to somewhere safe, Lydia decides to sacrifice herself, knowing that she can at least reduce the impact of the explosion. She jumps out of the building with the bomb and dives into the Chicago River, seemingly dying in the explosion. However, the paramedics manage to find her body and resuscitate her. Thunder Force, now with Emily and Lydia's friendship even stronger, are offered the assistance of the city's resources by the mayor, which they accept.

== Cast ==
- Melissa McCarthy as Lydia Berman / The Hammer
  - Mia Kaplan as teen Lydia Berman
  - Vivian Falcone as young Lydia Berman
- Octavia Spencer as Emily Stanton / Bingo
  - Tai Leshaun as teen Emily Stanton
  - Bria Danielle as young Emily Stanton
- Jason Bateman as Jerry / The Crab
- Bobby Cannavale as William Stevens / The King
- Pom Klementieff as Laser
- Melissa Leo as Allie
- Taylor Mosby as Tracy
- Marcella Lowery as Grandma Norma
- Melissa Ponzio as Rachel Gonzales
- Ben Falcone as Kenny
- Kevin Dunn as Frank
- Tyrel Jackson Williams as Jessie
- Sarah Baker as B. Krut
- David Storrs as Andrew
- Brendan Jennings as Clyde
- Jackson Dippel as Young Wayne

== Production ==
On March 29, 2019, it was reported that Netflix had greenlit a superhero comedy film entitled Thunder Force to be written and directed by Ben Falcone, with Melissa McCarthy and Octavia Spencer as lead roles.

Principal photography began September 25, 2019 in Atlanta, Georgia and wrapped on December 10, 2019.

In lieu of eating raw chicken on-screen, which McCarthy's character is required to do to maintain her super strength, the cast ate "really thinly sliced pears treated with citric acid and food coloring."

== Reception ==
=== Audience viewership ===
In its first 28 days of release, Thunder Force was watched by approximately 52 million viewers worldwide.

=== Critical response ===
On Rotten Tomatoes, the film has an approval percentage of 22% based on 143 reviews and an average rating of 4.10 out of 10. The critics consensus states: "It's got a few chuckles, but Thunder Force is largely a superhero comedy that's neither exciting nor funny -- and an egregious waste of its co-stars' talents." On Metacritic, the film has a score of 34 out of 100 based on 34 critic reviews, indicating "generally unfavorable".

Richard Roeper of the Chicago Sun-Times gave the film 1.5 out of 4 stars, writing: "It's always a shame when a group of talented humans get together and deliver something that comes across as a halfhearted effort, even if they poured their blood, sweat and tears into it." Kate Erbland of IndieWire gave the film a "C" and wrote: "While McCarthy and Spencer do their damndest to make the family-friendly feature work — McCarthy in particular brings real texture to her charming slacker with a heart of gold, a role she's played so many times before — Thunder Force isn't clever enough to break new ground in the superhero milieu, nor is it silly enough to mine its material for the kind of jokes that would make it distinctive."
