= The Last O.G. =

American comedy TV series (2018–2021)

- Title screen from the pilot
- Genre: Comedy
- Created by: John Carcieri; Jordan Peele
- Starring: Tracy Morgan; Tiffany Haddish; Allen Maldonado; Ryan Gaul; Taylor Christian Mosby; Dante Hoagland; Cedric the Entertainer
- Composer: Joseph Stephens
- Country of origin: United States
- Original language: English
- No. of seasons: 4
- No. of episodes: 40

Production
- Executive producers: Tracy Morgan; Jorma Taccone; Eric Tannenbaum; Kim Tannenbaum; Joel Zadak; John Carcieri; Jordan Peele; Saladin K. Patterson
- Producers: Alex Rubens; Jason Wang; Steven Ast
- Cinematography: Michael Simmonds
- Camera setup: Single-camera
- Running time: 22 minutes
- Production companies: Streetlife Productions Inc.; Monkeypaw Productions; Full Flavor; The Tannenbaum Company; Principato-Young Entertainment; Matthew 633; Artists First; Studio T

Original release
- Network: TBS
- Release: March 31, 2018 – December 21, 2021

The Last O.G. is an American comedy television series created by Jordan Peele and John Carcieri that premiered on March 31, 2018, on TBS. The series follows a convict released after serving fifteen years who returns to Brooklyn to find his old neighborhood has changed, and his ex-girlfriend is raising their children with another man. It stars Tracy Morgan, Tiffany Haddish, Allen Maldonado, Ryan Gaul, Taylor Christian Mosby, Dante Hoagland, and Cedric the Entertainer.

In October 2020, the series was renewed for a fourth season which premiered on October 26, 2021, and concluded on December 21, 2021. In April 2022, the series was canceled after four seasons.

== Premise ==
Tray is an ex-con who is released from prison for good behavior after serving fifteen years. He returns to his old Brooklyn neighborhood to find that it has become gentrified. His ex-girlfriend, Shannon (also known by nickname Shay-Shay), has married another man named Josh and is raising his twin children Amira and Shahzad. Tray decides to become a better man and a father with the help of the owner of a halfway house, Mullins, and his cousin Bobby.

== Cast and characters ==
=== Main ===
- Tracy Morgan as Tray Leviticus Barker
- Tiffany Haddish as Shannon "Shay-Shay" Birkeland (seasons 1–3)
- Allen Maldonado as Robert "Bobby" Barker (seasons 1–3)
  - Maldonado also plays Clyde Barker, Bobby's deceased older brother
- Ryan Gaul as Josh Birkeland
- Taylor Mosby as Amira Birkeland
- Dante Hoagland as Shahzad Birkeland
- Cedric the Entertainer as Miniard Mullins (main season 1, recurring season 2–3)
- Anna Maria Horsford as Roberta (recurring seasons 1–3, main season 4)
- Da'Vine Joy Randolph as Veesy (season 4)

=== Recurring ===
- Bresha Webb as Faith
- Byrne Davis, Jr. as Billy C.
- Cassandra Freeman as Jasmine
- Da'Vine Joy Randolph as Veesy
- Derek Gaines as Jason "Jaybird" Watkins
- Daniel J. Watts as Felony
- Dimitri Joseph Moise as Mostel Defferies
- Edi Patterson as Elizabeth
- Gino Vento as Gustavo
- Giovanni Figueroa as Javi
- Lord Jamar as Divine
- Janet Hubert as Miss May Miller
- Joel Marsh Garland as Erwin "Big Country"
- J. B. Smoove as Carl
- Malik Yoba as Wavy
- Method Man as Green-Eyes
- Miles G. Jackson as Benjamin
- Natalie Carter as Ruth
- Randy Gambill as Jason

=== Guest ===
- Beverly Sade as Angel
- Jon J. Masters as Mr. Washington
- Judith Roberts as Mrs. Washington
- Chrissy Metz as Pooh Cat
- Thomas Jefferson Byrd as Jimmy
- Ebony Jo-Ann as Aunt Mercedes
- Luenell as Aunt Elaine
- Katt Williams as Fred
- Mike Tyson as Triple O.G
- Gary Dourdan as Bricks
- Teddy Atlas as himself
- Mark Breland as himself

== Episodes ==
=== Series overview ===
Season	Episodes	Originally released	
Season	Episodes	First released	Last released
1	10	March 31, 2018	June 5, 2018
2	10	March 30, 2019	June 4, 2019
3	10	April 7, 2020	June 9, 2020
4	10	October 26, 2021	December 21, 2021

=== Season 1 (2018) ===
No. overall	No. in season	Title	Directed by	Written by	Original release date	U.S. viewers (millions)
1	1	"Pilot"	Jorma Taccone	John Carcieri & Jordan Peele	March 31, 2018 (Note: The episode originally aired as a "sneak peek" on March 31, 2018. It was later re-aired for its official television premiere on April 3, 2018.)	1.87 (Note: The episode's official premiere was viewed by 1.8 million people.)
2	2	"Bobo Beans"	Chioke Nassor	Jeff Stilson	April 10, 2018	1.52
3	3	"Truth Safari"	Chioke Nassor	Alex Rubens	April 17, 2018	1.12
4	4	"Swipe Right"	John Lee	Diallo Riddle & Bashir Salahuddin	April 24, 2018	1.16
5	5	"Repass"	Chioke Nassor	Diarra Kilpatrick	May 1, 2018	1.05
6	6	"Tray-ning Day"	Maurice Marable	Marc Theobald	May 8, 2018	1.15
7	7	"Lemon Drops"	John Lee	Adam Schulman	May 15, 2018	1.01
8	8	"That Backslide"	Maurice Marable	Diallo Riddle & Bashir Salahuddin	May 22, 2018	1.04
9	9	"Paid in Full"	Jorma Taccone	John Carcieri	May 29, 2018	1.17
10	10	"Clemenza"	Chioke Nassor	John Carcieri & Jordan Peele	June 5, 2018	1.16

=== Season 2 (2019) ===
No. overall	No. in season	Title	Directed by	Written by	Original release date	U.S. viewers (millions)
11	1	"Ladies First"	Pete Chatmon	Mary Fitzgerald	March 30, 2019 (Note: The episode originally aired as a "sneak peek" on March 30, 2019 and was later re-aired for its official television timeslot premiere on April 2, 2019 which received 1.00 viewers.)	1.63
12	2	"Git Up, Git Out & Git Something"	Jorma Taccone	Marc Theobald	April 9, 2019	0.89
13	3	"A Roller Skating Jam Named Saturdays"	Jorma Taccone	Diarra Kilpatrick	April 16, 2019	0.87
14	4	"Scenario"	Pete Chatmon	Allen Maldonado	April 23, 2019	0.85
15	5	"Sound of Da Police"	Matthew A. Cherry	Kevin Arietta	April 30, 2019	0.87
16	6	"Keep Their Heads Ringing"	Pete Chatmon	Jordan Black	May 7, 2019	0.82
17	7	"Criminal Minded"	Reginald Hudlin	Arthur Harris & Angela Nissel	May 14, 2019	0.74
18	8	"Mama Said Knock You Out"	Maurice Marable	Tracey Ashley	May 21, 2019	0.97
19	9	"Your Mom's in My Business"	Reginald Hudlin	Jordan Black	May 28, 2019	0.93
20	10	"Fight the Power"	Reginald Hudlin	Saladin K. Patterson	June 4, 2019	0.80

=== Season 3 (2020) ===
No. overall	No. in season	Title	Directed by	Written by	Original release date	U.S. viewers (millions)
21	1	"Lookin at the Front Door"	Matt Sohn	Keenen Ivory Wayans & Jerron Horton	April 7, 2020	0.81
22	2	"Started from the Bottom"	Dale Stern	Keenen Ivory Wayans & Tyree Elaine	April 14, 2020	0.66
23	3	"Ballin"	Dale Stern	Keenen Ivory Wayans & Kate Spurgeon	April 21, 2020	0.84
24	4	"They Reminisce Over You"	Matt Sohn	Keenen Ivory Wayans & Kate Spurgeon	April 28, 2020	0.71
25	5	"Family Feud"	Robert Townsend	Keenen Ivory Wayans & Andrew Barbot	May 5, 2020	0.72
26	6	"The Breaks"	Richie Keen	Keenen Ivory Wayans & Charla Lauriston	May 12, 2020	0.75
27	7	"In Da Club"	Richie Keen	Keenen Ivory Wayans & Marc Theobald	May 19, 2020	0.72
28	8	"Come Clean"	Robert Townsend	Keenen Ivory Wayans & Carl Jones	May 26, 2020	0.65
29	9	"All I Need"	Tiffany Johnson	Marc Theobald	June 2, 2020	0.76
30	10	"Warning"	Matt Sohn	Carl Jones	June 9, 2020	0.72

=== Season 4 (2021) ===
No. overall	No. in season	Title	Directed by	Written by	Original release date	U.S. viewers (millions)
31	1	"Staying Alive"	Ali LeRoi	Owen Smith	October 26, 2021	0.45
32	2	"The First Hump Is the Hardest"	Ali LeRoi	Lakshmi Sundaram	October 26, 2021	0.33
33	3	"Tray Finds His Purpose"	Keesha Sharp	Ian Edwards	November 2, 2021	0.46
34	4	"If You Can't Buy, Rent"	Keesha Sharp	Jeff Stilson	November 9, 2021	0.57
35	5	"Helping Is Hard"	Carl Weathers	Jim Woods	November 16, 2021	0.55
36	6	"The Negotiator"	Carl Weathers	Marc Theobald	November 23, 2021	0.60
37	7	"Smush"	Oz Scott	Ella Robinson Brooks	November 30, 2021	0.51
38	8	"Know Thyself"	Oz Scott	Amberia Allen	December 7, 2021	0.48
39	9	"The Squared Circle"	Mike Mariano	Mike Mariano	December 14, 2021	0.49
40	10	"The Payback"	Mike Mariano	Maiya Williams	December 21, 2021	0.52

== Production ==
=== Development ===
On January 16, 2016, it was announced that FX had given the production a pilot order. The episode was written by Jordan Peele and John Carcieri. Executive producers were set to include Peele, Carcieri, Tracy Morgan, Eric Tannenbaum, and Joel Zadak. Production companies involved with the pilot included FX Productions.

On October 17, 2016, it was announced that series was moving from FX to TBS and that it had been given a series order for a first season consisting of ten episodes. The previous month, FX decided not to proceed with the production and its producers began to shop it around. Various networks showed interest but it ultimately came down to TBS and Comedy Central. The existing pilot script was rewritten and Studio T became involved in the series' production replacing FX Productions.

On May 17, 2017, it was announced that the series had been titled The Last O.G. On July 27, 2017, it was announced that series would premiere on October 24, 2017, with two episodes airing for a full hour. However, on January 11, 2018, it was announced that series would premiere on April 3, 2018. The premiere had been delayed after the departure of series co-creator and showrunner John Carcieri, who left after production on season one had ended. He was replaced by Saladin K. Patterson. On April 23, 2018, it was announced that the series had been renewed for a second season. On January 16, 2019, it was announced that the second season would premiere on April 2, 2019. On May 15, 2019, the series was renewed for a third season which premiered on April 7, 2020. On October 15, 2020, TBS renewed the series for a fourth season which premiered on October 26, 2021. In April 2022, it was revealed that the fourth season was the final season, the final episode having aired on December 21, 2021.

=== Casting ===
Alongside the initial pilot announcement, it was confirmed that Tracy Morgan would star in the series. On March 15, 2017, it was announced that Allen Maldonado had been cast as series regular. On April 13, 2017, it was reported that Ryan Gaul was joining the main cast. In May 2017, it was announced that Tiffany Haddish, Cedric the Entertainer, Taylor Mosby, and Dante Hoagland were joining the show as series regulars.

== Release ==
=== Marketing ===
On February 16, 2018, TBS released the first trailer for the series. On January 16, 2019, a trailer for season two was released.

=== Premiere ===
On March 12, 2018, the series held its world premiere at the annual South by Southwest Film Festival in Austin, Texas at the Paramount Theatre. Following the screening, journalist Ramin Setoodeh moderated a question-and-answer session with Jorma Taccone, Tracy Morgan, and Tiffany Haddish.

== Reception ==
=== Critical response ===
The series was met with a positive response from critics upon its premiere. On review aggregation website Rotten Tomatoes, the series holds an approval rating of 82% with an average rating of 7.47 out of 10 based on 34 reviews. The website's critical consensus reads, "Despite uneven writing, The Last O.G. succeeds on the strength of Tracy Morgan's inspired performance and Tiffany Haddish's comic instincts." On Metacritic it has a weighted average score of 65 out of 100 based on 18 reviews, indicating "generally favorable reviews".

=== Ratings ===
On April 3, 2018, the official series premiere drew 1.8 million total viewers, with 882K in the key 18-49 demo in Live + same day. This was the largest cable comedy premiere since 2016, the largest scripted cable comedy premiere since 2015, and the strongest TBS original debut ever. In addition, more than 6.9 million total viewers tuned into the show over a three-night, five-telecast launch on TBS and TNT following the NCAA Men's Basketball Final Four.

=== Awards and nominations ===
Year	Award	Category	Nominee	Result	Ref.
2018	BET Awards	Best Actress	Tiffany Haddish	Won	
2018	Black Reel Awards	Outstanding Actor in a Comedy Series	Tracy Morgan	Nominated	
2018	Black Reel Awards	Outstanding Actress in a Comedy Series	Tiffany Haddish	Nominated	
2018	Black Reel Awards	Outstanding Writing in a Comedy Series	Jordan Peele & John Carcieri	Nominated	
2019	BET Awards	Best Actress	Tiffany Haddish	Nominated	
2019	NAACP Image Awards	Outstanding Actor in a Comedy Series	Tracy Morgan	Nominated	
2019	People's Choice Awards	Favorite Comedy TV Star	Tiffany Haddish	Nominated	
2019	Shorty Awards	Best TV Series	The Last O.G.	Nominated	
