= Ben Falcone =

American actor, comedian, screenwriter and producer

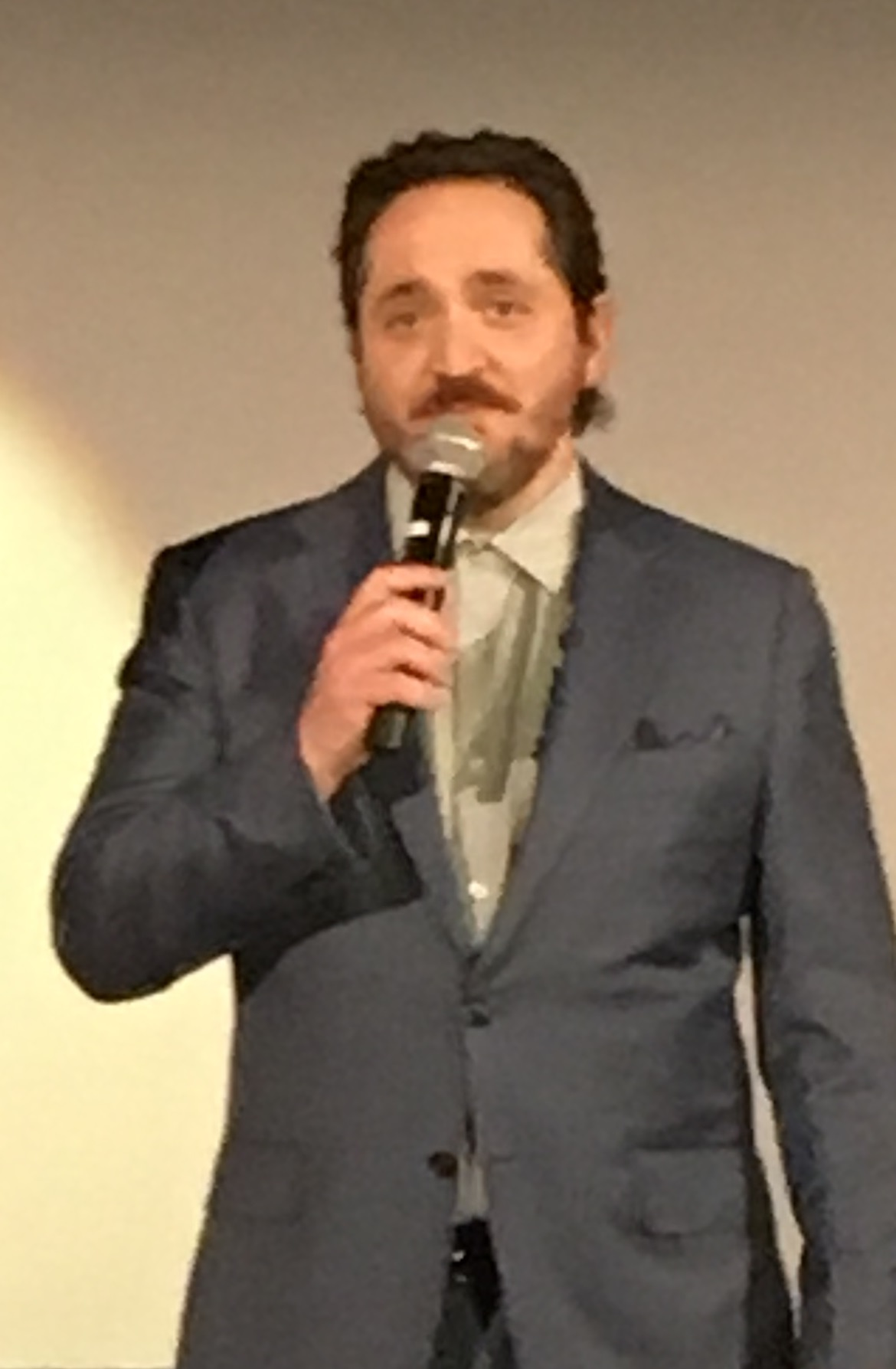
- Falcone in 2016
- Born: Benjamin Scott Falcone; August 25, 1973 (age 53); Carbondale, Illinois, U.S.
- Occupations: Actor; comedian; filmmaker
- Years active: 2001–present
- Spouse: Melissa McCarthy (m. 2005)
- Children: 2

Benjamin Scott Falcone (born August 25, 1973) is an American actor, comedian and filmmaker. He is married to actress Melissa McCarthy, with whom he frequently collaborates. Falcone made his directorial debut in 2014 with Tammy, which he co-wrote with McCarthy, and he also directed, co-wrote, and produced The Boss, Life of the Party, Superintelligence, and Thunder Force, all of which starred McCarthy. In 2022, Falcone created and starred in the Netflix series God's Favorite Idiot.

He has had cameos in Bridesmaids, Identity Thief, The Heat, Spy, Can You Ever Forgive Me?, and Nine Perfect Strangers, all of which starred his wife.

== Early life ==
Falcone was born in Carbondale, Illinois, the son of Peg and Steve Falcone. He is of Italian, English, German, and Irish descent.

== Personal life ==
Falcone married his longtime girlfriend, actress Melissa McCarthy, on October 8, 2005. They have two children.

== Filmography ==
=== Film Production ===
Year	Title	Director	Writer	Producer
2014	Tammy	Yes	Yes	Executive
2016	The Boss	Yes	Yes	Yes
2018	Life of the Party	Yes	Yes	Yes
2018	The Happytime Murders	No	No	Yes
2020	Superintelligence	Yes	No	Yes
2021	Thunder Force	Yes	Yes	Yes
2021	Bob Ross: Happy Accidents, Betrayal & Greed	No	No	Yes
2027	Margie Claus	No	Yes	Yes

Acting roles

Year	Movie	Role	Info
2005	Cheaper by the Dozen 2	Theater Patron	
2006	Garfield: A Tail of Two Kitties	Tourist at Castle	
2007	Smiley Face	Agent	
2007	The Nines	Himself	
2007	Cook Off!	Cameron Strang	
2011	Bridesmaids	Air Marshal Jon	
2012	What to Expect When You're Expecting	Gary Cooper	
2013	Identity Thief	Tony	
2013	The Heat	Blue-Collar Man	
2013	Enough Said	Will	
2013	Bad Words	Pete Fowler	
2014	Tammy	Keith Morgan	
2015	Spy	American Tourist	
2016	The Boss	Marty	
2016	Office Christmas Party	Doctor	
2017	CHiPs	Bicycle Cop	
2018	Life of the Party	Dale, the Uber Driver	
2018	Scooby-Doo! and the Gourmet Ghost	Evan	Voice
2018	The Happytime Murders	Donny	
2018	Can You Ever Forgive Me?	Alan Schmidt	
2020	Superintelligence	Agent Charles Kuiper	
2021	Thunder Force	Kenny	
2022	Thor: Love and Thunder	Stage manager	

=== Television ===
Year	Title	Director	Executive Producer	Writer	Notes
2011–2012	The Looney Tunes Show	No	No	Yes	14 episodes
2017–2018	Nobodies	Yes	Yes	No	Pilot episode
2022	God's Favorite Idiot	No	Yes	Yes	Creator and star

Acting roles

- 2002: Curb Your Enthusiasm (1 episode) Season 3, Episode 10, "The Grand Opening"
- 2002: Yes, Dear (1 episode) Stalker, Season 3 Episode 9
- 2003: Gilmore Girls (1 episode) Fran's Lawyer Season 3 Episode 20
- 2004–2006: Joey (17 episodes)
- 2006 My Name Is Earl (season 1 episode 18(Ed Reed))
- 2010: Bones (1 episode) Death of a Queen Bee Season 5 Episode 17
- 2011–2012: The Looney Tunes Show (Voice of Henery Hawk, 2 episodes)
- 2012: Don't Trust the B— in Apartment 23
- 2012: Up All Night (1 episode)
- 2012: Happy Endings (1 episode)
- 2013: Go On (1 episode)
- 2014–2015: New Girl – Mike
- 2014: A to Z (6 episodes)
- 2017–18: Nobodies (12 episodes)
- 2022: God's Favorite Idiot (8 episodes) - Clark Thompson
