= Usman Ally =

Pakistani actor

- Born: August 27, 1982 (age 43); Swaziland
- Education: Lewis and Clark College (BA); University of Florida (MFA)
- Occupation: Actor
- Children: 2

Usman Ally (born August 27, 1982) is a Swazi-born Pakistani-American film, stage and television actor. Marking his acting debut in 2008, Ally won an Obie Award in 2015 for his role in The Invisible Hand.

He has appeared in several stage productions including The Elaborate Entrance of Chad Deity, The Jungle Book and a production of Around the World in 80 Days. He is known for his on-screen roles such as Fernald the Hook-Handed Man in Netflix's adaptation of A Series of Unfortunate Events, which premiered in 2017 and Andy Malik in Suits.

== Background ==
Ally was born in Eswatini (formerly Swaziland) to Pakistani parents. He grew up in Kenya, Botswana, Tanzania, and Pakistan. According to Ally, his family regularly moved because his father was involved in international trade.

At age 18, Ally moved to the United States and attended Lewis & Clark College in Portland, Oregon, majoring in theater and cultural anthropology. Soon after graduating from Lewis and Clark, he attended the University of Florida, where he graduated magna cum laude with a Master of Fine Arts in acting. He has lived in Portland, Chicago, and Los Angeles.

== Filmography ==
=== Film ===
Year	Title	Role	Notes
2008	The Group	Sunil	Short film
2009	Chicago Overcoat	Pawnshop Owner	
2011	Our Fathers	Ahmed	Short film
2012	Just Like a Woman	Ousman	
2013	Star Trek Into Darkness	U.S.S. Vengeance Officer	
2015	Misled	Waseem	
2016	Love Meet Hope	Andrew	
2020	The Hunt	Crisis Mike	
2020	Superintelligence	Sergei	
2022	Grimcutty	Amir Chaudhry	

=== Television ===
Year	Title	Role	Notes
2011	The Chicago Code	Abrahm	Episode: "St. Valentine's Day Massacre"
2011	Damages	Nasim Marwat	4 episodes
2012	Boss	Joe Young	2 episodes
2013	Blue Bloods	Vendor	Episode: "No Regrets"
2014	Mind Games	Charles	Episode: "Pilot"
2014	Person of Interest	Jamal Risha	Episode: "Allegiance"
2014–2015	Madam Secretary	Zahed Javani	3 episodes
2015	Castle	Bilal Jafari	Episode: "Sleeper"
2015	The Player	Hamid	Episode: "Pilot"
2015	Brooklyn Animal Control	Lawyer	Episode 1.1
2016	Blindspot	Hakim	Episode: "Cease Forcing Enemy"
2016	Helen & Grace	Coach	2 episodes
2016	Agents of S.H.I.E.L.D.	Vincent	3 episodes
2016	The Librarians	Security Lt. Becker	Episode: "And the Fangs of Death"
2016–2017	Veep	Ambassador Al Jaffar	6 episodes
2017–2018	Nobodies	Gavin	Recurring role
2017–2018	Mike Tyson Mysteries	Raji, Mahmoud, Price Abdul Al Farooq	Voice, 2 episodes
2017–2019	A Series of Unfortunate Events	Fernald the Hook-Handed Man	Recurring role
2017–2019	Suits	Andrew Malik	4 episodes
2017	Just Add Magic	Mr. Morris	8 episodes
2017	Lifeline	Nathan	Main role
2017	Curb Your Enthusiasm	Morsi Driver	Episode: "Never Wait for Seconds!"
2019	Better Things	Dr. Babu	Episode: "No Limits"
2019	On Becoming a God in Central Florida	Stan Van Grundegaard	Recurring role
2019–2020	NCIS	Victor Mir	2 episodes
2020	68 Whiskey	Captain Hazara	Recurring role
2021	Call Me Kat	Dr. Kevin Khan	Episode: "Therapy"
2021	Young Justice	Khalid Nassour, Muhammad Nassour	Voice, recurring role (5 episodes)
2022	God's Favorite Idiot	Mohsin Raza	16 episodes
2023	The Good Doctor	Roland Barnes	Episode: "Old Friends"
2026	The Pitt	Dr. Raymond Javadi	Episode: "1:00 P.M."

=== Video games ===
Year	Title	Role	Notes
2016	Uncharted 4: A Thief's End	Asav	Multiplayer only
2017	Uncharted: The Lost Legacy	Asav	Also motion capture
2017	Middle-earth: Shadow of War	Serka	"Desolation of Mordor" DLC
2019	The Elder Scrolls Online	Zamarak	
2019	Magic: The Gathering Arena	Oko, Thief of Crowns	
2020	Fast & Furious Crossroads	Kai	
2020	Avengers	George Tarleton / M.O.D.O.K.	
2022	God of War Ragnarök	Durlin	
