= Superintelligence (film) =

2020 film by Ben Falcone

- Original release poster
- Directed by: Ben Falcone
- Written by: Steve Mallory
- Produced by: Ben Falcone; Melissa McCarthy; Rob Cowan
- Starring: Melissa McCarthy; Bobby Cannavale; Brian Tyree Henry; James Corden
- Cinematography: Barry Peterson
- Edited by: Tia Nolan
- Music by: Fil Eisler
- Production companies: Warner Max; Warner Bros. Pictures; New Line Cinema; Bron Creative; On the Day Productions
- Distributed by: HBO Max
- Release date: November 26, 2020
- Running time: 106 minutes
- Country: United States
- Language: English
- Box office: $4.2 million

Superintelligence is a 2020 American romantic action comedy film directed by Ben Falcone and written by Steve Mallory. The film stars Melissa McCarthy in her fourth collaboration with her husband, Falcone.

Superintelligence was released by Warner Bros. Pictures digitally in the United States via HBO Max, and theatrically in some international markets, on November 26, 2020. The film has grossed $4 million and received mixed reviews from critics, who called the film "forgettable", although McCarthy's performance was praised.

The film was removed from HBO Max in July 2022.

== Plot ==
Eight years ago, Carol Peters left her executive job at Yahoo! in order to lead a more altruistic life. Unsatisfied with the current job market in Seattle, she now lives day to day, doing non-profit work to advocate for the environment, caring for animals and making the world a better place. A friend and former colleague, Dennis, talks her into interviewing for a modern dating website. An interviewer labels her "the most average person on Earth", which is heard by an autonomous artificial intelligence (AI).

The next morning in her apartment, a voice starts communicating with Carol through her TV, cell phone and rice maker. The AI speaks with the voice of James Corden, as he is her favorite celebrity, to soothe her when she freaks out. The supercomputer has become sentient and now is determining whether to save, enslave or obliterate humanity and start over. Carol, as test subject, is the planet's only hope.

The AI wants to study Carol and her interactions as a way to learn about humanity. Telling Carol it will be watching her over three days to decide, it erases her student debt and deposits 10 million dollars into her bank account. It suggests she confide in Dennis, a researcher at Microsoft. She goes to his workplace, and the AI talks to him and convinces him it is real, not a figment of Carol's imagination.

The AI also convinces Carol to try to get back with her ex-boyfriend George. It thinks that observing their reconciliation would be the ideal way to prove humans are capable of love and redemption. The AI presents Carol with a self-driving Tesla and takes her to a high-end clothing designer to revamp her look.

When Carol arrives outside George's place, NSA agents abduct her, tipped off by Dennis. In their interrogation, she tells them the AI's goal. It announces it is freeing her, threatening their annihilation if they try to stop it. The AI organizes a meet cute for Carol and George. Initially ineffective, she tries again, inviting him to dinner. In the meantime, Dennis meets with the President of the United States, convincing her and the world to shut down all electronics, hoping to neutralize the AI.

Although George will be leaving the country in a few days, he and Carol bond in that time. The AI steers them to the Mexican restaurant where they had their first date. They reconcile, spending the night together. They spend the whole next day together doing things George loves, including meeting his personal hero at a Seattle Mariners game.

Carol steps away from George, getting accosted by the NSA again. She is told about their grand plan of trapping the AI in Seattle, and they swear her to secrecy. Although she has had an amazing day with George, Carol opts not to stay the night, believing if she did so, it would be too hard to let him go.

As Carol leaves, the AI hounds her to explain herself, but she blocks him out. The next morning, she is told the Earth is now on a five-hour countdown to destruction. Carol selflessly chooses to turn down the NSA's offer to protect her with them in an underground bunker and instead helps George finish packing for his Ireland fellowship. Carol's unexpected actions convince the AI that it has not really understood, so cancels Armageddon.

== Cast ==
- Melissa McCarthy as Carol Vivian Peters
- James Corden as the voice of "Super Intelligence"/himself
- Bobby Cannavale as George Churchill, Carol's love interest
- Brian Tyree Henry as Dennis Caruso, Carol's best friend
- Jean Smart as President Monahan
- Sam Richardson as Agent John Donahue, an NSA agent
- Ben Falcone as Agent Charles Kuiper, an NSA agent
- Rachel Ticotin as Director Tyson
- Michael Beach as General Saul Gomez
- Jessica St. Clair as Leslie
- Karan Soni as Ahmed
- Sarah Baker as Emily
- Jay Lay as Jay
- Usman Ally as Sergei
- Jenna Perusich as Helga
- Eduardo Franco as Todd
- Jessie Ennis as Pedestrian
- Ken Griffey Jr. as himself
- Octavia Spencer as voice of "Super Intelligence"/herself
- William Daniels as the voice of KITT
- Andrew Tinpo Lee as Mr. Peacock

== Production ==
In July 2017, it was reported that New Line Cinema had purchased the screenplay by Steve Mallory, with Melissa McCarthy and Ben Falcone on board the project to produce through their On the Day Productions banner. In April 2018, it was announced that McCarthy would star in the film and Falcone would direct it, marking their fourth actor-director collaboration. In June 2018, James Corden joined the cast, to voice the titular "Super Intelligence". In July 2018, Bobby Cannavale, Brian Tyree Henry, and Sam Richardson joined the cast.

The film started principal production right after McCarthy wrapped filming The Kitchen, on July 16, 2018, and wrapped on August 31, 2018. Some scenes were filmed at Georgia Tech. The restaurant scene was filmed at Landmark Diner in downtown Atlanta and the outdoor scenes were filmed on Broad Street, as evidenced by Dua Vietnamese Restaurant and Reuben's Deli.

== Release ==
The film was digitally released on HBO Max on November 26, 2020. The film was initially scheduled for theatrical release on December 25, 2019, but was later moved up five days, prior to WarnerMedia deciding in October 2019 to shift the film to a streaming release; Falcone said at that time that he agreed it would be better suited to a streaming platform.

The film grossed $745,000 from five countries in its opening weekend.

== Critical reception ==
On review aggregator Rotten Tomatoes, the film has an approval rating of 31% based on 67 reviews, with an average rating of 4.6/10. The website's critics consensus reads: "You won't need Superintelligence to steer clear of the latest forgettable comedy to fail to take full advantage of Melissa McCarthy's talents." On Metacritic, it has a weighted average score of 41 out of 100, based on 17 critics, indicating "mixed or average reviews".

David Ehrlich of IndieWire called it one of the year's worst films, and "a lifeless, laugh-free slab of nothing like Superintelligence, which starts with “what if Skynet, but with jokes?” and then just gasps for air for the next 105 minutes." Caryn James of The Hollywood Reporter wrote: "The cast, though, is full of extraordinary actors, who do what they can to redeem a lame script and style."

McCarthy was nominated for the 2021 Kids' Choice Award for Favorite Movie Actress.
