= Life of the Party (2018 film) =

2018 film by Ben Falcone

- Theatrical release poster
- Directed by: Ben Falcone
- Written by: Ben Falcone; Melissa McCarthy
- Produced by: Ben Falcone; Melissa McCarthy; Chris Henchy
- Starring: Melissa McCarthy; Gillian Jacobs; Maya Rudolph; Julie Bowen; Matt Walsh; Molly Gordon; Stephen Root; Jacki Weaver
- Cinematography: Julio Macat
- Edited by: Brian Olds
- Music by: Fil Eisler
- Production companies: New Line Cinema; On the Day Productions
- Distributed by: Warner Bros. Pictures
- Release date: May 11, 2018
- Running time: 105 minutes
- Country: United States
- Language: English
- Budget: $30 million
- Box office: $65.9 million

Life of the Party is a 2018 American comedy film directed by Ben Falcone and written by Falcone and Melissa McCarthy. The film, starring McCarthy and Molly Gordon, follows a newly divorced mother who returns to college to complete her degree, and ends up bonding with her daughter's friends.

Produced by On the Day Productions and New Line Cinema, the film was released on May 11, 2018, by Warner Bros. Pictures. It received mixed reviews from critics and grossed $65 million.

== Plot ==
After dropping off their 22-year-old daughter Maddie to her senior year at Decatur University in Atlanta, Dan tells Deanna that he wants a divorce because he has fallen in love with another woman, realtor Marcie. Heartbroken, Deanna visits her parents Mike and Sandy to tell them what happened, with Mike furiously denouncing Dan for making Deanna drop out of college in her final year because she was pregnant, as well as his overbearing ways during their marriage.

Deanna visits Maddie to tell her the news and about her plans to enroll at Decatur University to finish her degree in archaeology. Maddie is doubtful, but supportive. She introduces Deanna to her sorority friends Amanda, neurotic Debbie, and Helen. Deanna later meets her agoraphobic and chronically depressed roommate Leonor. On the first day of school, she meets demeaning girls Jennifer and Trina, who mock Deanna's age.

Deanna, supported by good friend Christine, joins Dan, supported by Marcie, at a mediation session to prepare their divorce papers. Marcie intends to sell their house without Deanna's approval.

Maddie and her friends take Deanna to a frat party, where she meets a student named Jack, a friend of Maddie's boyfriend, Tyler. The next morning mother and daughter catch each other leaving the bedrooms of their respective guys. Jack has truly fallen for Deanna, and they have sex again in the stacks at the library.

Another night, they attend an 80's-themed party where Deanna has a dance-off with Jennifer, resulting in earning the respect of her schoolmates. She has become both “one of the girls” but also a trusted mentor to Maddie's sorority sisters, who make her an honorary sister. Deanna is also doing great in her classes, until she has a midterm exam that requires an oral presentation. Her stage fright causes her to collapse part way through.

While Deanna is at a restaurant with Christine and Frank (her husband), and another couple (Bill and Amy) from their group of friends, Dan and Marcie unexpectedly show up, declaring they are getting married. Jack turns out to be Marcie's son, and, finding out about Deanna sleeping with Jack, Marcie walks out in disgust.

While Maddie attends Dan and Marcie's wedding, Deanna and her student friends unknowingly get high from chocolate bark laced with marijuana, and they head to the reception, where they start wrecking the wedding hall. Dan, Marcie and Maddie find them and Marcie tells Deanna she is cut off financially from Dan.

Deanna tries to make amends with Maddie, and tells her that she is leaving college since she has no means of paying the rest of her tuition. The girls decide to throw a party to raise the money. No one shows up as they are at a Christina Aguilera concert, so Helen posts a Twitter message claiming Aguilera will be at the party after her show. Christine and Frank attend, along with Mike and Sandy. Mike offers to give Deanna a 401K check to pay her tuition, but Deanna refuses. The party is soon filled with people expecting Aguilera, when a suspicious Jennifer confronts Helen, telling her that if Aguilera doesn't show up in three seconds, Jennifer will put Helen in another coma. The two girls engage in a serious fist fight until Deanna intervenes, telling them that girls should support each other and behave like friends. Suddenly, Aguilera (who turns out to be Leonor's cousin) arrives, and puts on a show with Deanna and the girls to an excited crowd.

Deanna still needs to complete her presentation in class. She is nervous until Maddie, Helen, Amanda, Debbie and all the sorority sisters show up to support her, and this time, Deanna manages to give the presentation with ease. At the end of the year, Deanna and Maddie graduate together, with all their friends and family there to support them. Maddie encourages Deanna to throw her cap in the air. She does so, and as it falls it hits Dan in the face.

== Cast ==
- Melissa McCarthy as Deanna "Dee Rock" Miles (née Cook), a recently divorced woman who returns to college 22 years later for a second act.
- Molly Gordon as Maddie Miles, Dan and Deanna's daughter.
- Gillian Jacobs as Helen, a sorority sister and Maddie's friend, who is older than the rest due to having been in a coma for eight years.
- Maya Rudolph as Christine Davenport, Deanna's neurotic and heavy drinking best friend.
- Matt Walsh as Daniel "Dan" Miles, Deanna's ex-husband and Maddie's father.
- Julie Bowen as Marcie Strong, a real estate agent and Dan's lover.
- Luke Benward as Jack Strong, a popular and handsome frat boy, who has sex with Deanna at a party and becomes obsessed with her.
- Jessie Ennis as Debbie, a sorority sister and Maddie's friend, who always requests others' permission before talking.
- Adria Arjona as Amanda, another sorority sister and Maddie's friend, with "issues".
- Debby Ryan as Jennifer, a "mean girl" and Deanna's enemy.
- Heidi Gardner as Leonor, Deanna's depressive and weird roommate and, then, best friend.
- Stephen Root as Michael "Mike" Cook, Deanna's father and Maddie's grandfather.
- Jacki Weaver as Sandy Cook, Deanna's mother and Maddie's grandmother.
- Chris Parnell as Mr. Wayne Truzack, Deanna's professor and former classmate.
- Jimmy O. Yang as Tyler, Maddie's boyfriend and Jack's friend.
- Damon Jones as Frank Davenport, Christine's husband.
- Yani Simone as Trina, Jennifer's snarky sidekick.

Cameos

- Ben Falcone as the Uber driver.
- Karen Maruyama as Mediator
- Nat Faxon as Lance
- Sarah Baker as Gildred
- Steve Mallory as Bill
- Courtney Patterson as Amy
- Steve Falcone (Falcone's real-life father) as Older Man #1 / Vince
- Michael D. McCarthy (McCarthy's real-life father) as Older Man #2 / Dennis
- Christina Aguilera as herself
- Shannon Purser as Connie (Deleted Scene)

== Production ==
Life of the Party was announced in April 2016, with Melissa McCarthy set to star and Ben Falcone to direct. In July 2016, Gillian Jacobs was cast to play Helen, one of the sorority sisters of Deanna and Molly Gordon was cast as Deanna's daughter, Maddie. On August 2, Jacki Weaver joined the project to play Deanna's mother, Sandy. On August 4, Maya Rudolph was cast as Christine, Deanna's neurotic best friend On August 12, Debby Ryan Joined the cast to play Jennifer, a “mean girl” head of a sorority. On August 25, Matt Walsh was cast to play Dan, Deanna's husband. On August 29, Julie Bowen joined the cast to play Deanna's nemesis, Marcie.

Filming began in August 2016 in the metro Atlanta area. The sorority house used in the film is The Twelve Oaks Bed & Breakfast located in Covington, GA. The interior of the mansion was replicated in a warehouse in Decatur, GA for the interior scenes and the exterior scenes were filmed on location at the inn.

== Release ==
Life of the Party was released on May 11, 2018. The first official trailer for the film was released on February 5, 2018.

== Reception ==
=== Box office ===
Life of the Party grossed $53.1 million in the United States and Canada, and $12.8 million in other territories, for a worldwide total of $65.9 million.

In the United States and Canada, Life of the Party was released alongside Breaking In, and was projected to gross $18–21 million from 3,656 theaters in its opening weekend. It made $4.9 million on its first day, including $700,000 from Thursday night previews, down from the $985,000 McCarthy's The Boss grossed in March 2016, and similar to the $650,000 grossed by Snatched on the Thursday before the same weekend the previous year. The film went on to debut to $17.9 million, and finished second behind Avengers: Infinity War ($62 million in its third week); 80% of its audience was over the age of 25, while 70% was female. It fell 57% in its second weekend, to $7.6 million, finishing fourth at the box office, and another 33% to $5.1 million in its third, finishing fifth.

=== Critical response ===
On review aggregation website Rotten Tomatoes, the film has an approval rating of 38% based on 156 reviews, and an average rating of 5/10. The site's critical consensus reads, "Life of the Party's good-natured humor and abundance of onscreen talent aren't enough to make up for jumbled direction and a script that misses far more often than it hits." On Metacritic, the film has a weighted average score of 46 out of 100, based on reviews from 32 critics, indicating "mixed or average" reviews. Audiences polled by CinemaScore gave the film an average grade of "B" on an A+ to F scale, higher than the "C+" earned by McCarthy and Falcone's previous two film collaborations.

Critic Jeff Giles called it "a frustratingly middling comedy that never really figures out what to do with all that talent and fails to produce consistent laughs." Matt Zoller-Seitz of RogerEbert.com gave the film two out of four stars, calling it "the latest Melissa McCarthy star vehicle that fails to do justice to the sheer awesomeness of its leading lady." Leigh Monson from Birth.Movies.Death. wrote, "One hundred minutes of self-indulgence and tedium, even if it's well-meaning in its intentions."

=== Accolades ===
Award	Category	Recipient	Result
Teen Choice Awards	Choice Summer Movie		Nominated
Teen Choice Awards	Choice Summer Movie Actress	Melissa McCarthy	Nominated
People's Choice Awards	The Comedy Movie Star of 2018	Melissa McCarthy	Won
Alliance of Women Film Journalists	Actress Most in Need of a New Agent	Melissa McCarthy	Nominated
Golden Raspberry Awards	Worst Actress	Melissa McCarthy	Won
St. Louis Film Critics Association	Worst Film of the Year		Nominated

== Lawsuit ==
In September 2020, Melissa McCarthy, Ben Falcone and the film's producers were sued for $10 million by Eva Kowalski, who claimed she pitched the concept for the film to the studio in 2014 and they breached an implied-in-fact contract by producing it without compensation.
