= Taylor Mosby =

American actress and musician

- Born: Taylor Christian Mosby; December 28, 2002 (age 23)
- Occupations: Actress, musician
- Years active: 2012–present

Taylor Christian Mosby is an American actress and musician from Tulsa, Oklahoma. She is known for her parts in The Last O.G., Breakthrough, and Thunder Force. She has also portrayed a younger Miranda Bailey in Grey's Anatomy.

== Filmography ==
=== Film ===
Year	Title	Role	Notes
2013	Cleaver Family Reunion	Shauna	
2019	Breakthrough	Chayla	
2021	Thunder Force	Tracy	

=== Television ===
Year	Title	Role	Notes
2013	The Middle	Student #1	Episode: "The Graduation"
2013	Twisted	Lacey - Age 11	Episode: "Grief Is a Five-Letter Word"
2014	About a Boy	Witch #1	2 episodes
2014, 2015	Nicky, Ricky, Dicky & Dawn	Jordan	2 episodes
2014–2015	Criminal Minds	Markayla Davis	4 episodes
2015	Adam Ruins Everything	Marie	Episode: "Adam Ruins Voting"
2017	Life in Pieces	Gracie	Episode: "Babysit Argument Invention Butterfly"
2017	Snowfall	Young Gal	Episode: "Seven-Four"
2018	Grey's Anatomy	Collegiate Miranda Bailey	Episode: "(Don't Fear) the Reaper"
2018–2021	The Last O.G.	Amira Birkeland	34 episodes
2019	A Girl Named Jo	Abby Hughes	15 episodes
2023	Black Girl Missing	Marley	Television film
