= Tammy (film) =

2014 American film by Ben Falcone

- Theatrical release poster
- Directed by: Ben Falcone
- Written by: Melissa McCarthy; Ben Falcone
- Produced by: Melissa McCarthy; Will Ferrell; Adam McKay
- Starring: Melissa McCarthy; Susan Sarandon; Allison Janney; Gary Cole; Mark Duplass; Toni Collette; Sandra Oh; Nat Faxon; Dan Aykroyd; Kathy Bates
- Cinematography: Russ T. Alsobrook
- Edited by: Michael L. Sale
- Music by: Michael Andrews
- Production companies: New Line Cinema; RatPac-Dune Entertainment; Gary Sanchez Productions; On The Day Productions
- Distributed by: Warner Bros. Pictures
- Release date: July 2, 2014
- Running time: 97 minutes
- Country: United States
- Language: English
- Budget: $20 million (gross); $16.4 million (net)
- Box office: $100.3 million

Tammy is a 2014 American road comedy film directed and co-written by Ben Falcone in his directorial debut and co-produced, co-written by, and starring his wife Melissa McCarthy as the title character. The film also stars Susan Sarandon, Allison Janney, Gary Cole, Mark Duplass, Toni Collette, Sandra Oh, Nat Faxon, with Dan Aykroyd, and Kathy Bates. The film tells the story of a woman named Tammy (McCarthy) who hits the road with her profane, alcoholic grandmother (Sarandon) after she finds out that her husband (Faxon) is cheating on her. Tammy was released in theaters on July 2, 2014.

Despite being a box office success, grossing $100.3 million from a $20 million budget, it received generally negative reviews from critics with McCarthy and Sarandon receiving Razzie nominations for Worst Actress and Worst Supporting Actress respectively.

== Plot ==
In Murphysboro, Illinois, Tammy Banks strikes a deer on the way to her job at the fast food restaurant Topper Jack's, where she is later dismissed for her frequent tardiness. After her car breaks down on the way home on Illinois Route 13, she walks home to find her husband, Greg, eating a romantic meal with their neighbor, Missi. A frustrated Tammy leaves for her parents' house.

She tells her mother, Deb, about her plans to leave and takes her grandmother Pearl's Cadillac DeVille. Though Tammy initially turns down Pearl's request to come along, she accepts when Pearl proves she has a large sum of cash. Tammy has beer with Pearl, and the next morning they wake up near a park where Pearl convinces Tammy not to go back home. Pearl wants to visit Niagara Falls with Tammy since she had gone as a child. Along the way the two stop in a bar in Louisville, Kentucky, Tammy meets Earl Tillman and his son Bobby, and Earl hooks up with Pearl. Tammy and Bobby begin a romantic relationship as Pearl and Earl drunkenly make out in the car. Bobby gives Tammy his number to call him so he can pick up Earl. After Bobby picks up Earl the next morning, Tammy and Pearl are arrested after Pearl buys a case of beer for two teenagers and shoplifts a pint of whiskey for herself. Tammy is released, but Pearl stays at the jail for possessing illegal prescription drugs.

To bail out Pearl, Tammy robs a local Topper Jack's, where she converses with employees Becky and Larry. Finally having obtained the money, she rushes to the prison to bail Pearl out, but Bobby has already bailed her out. With the help of Pearl's wealthy lesbian cousin Lenore, they destroy the car to hide the evidence from the robbery. The two then stay at the home of Lenore and her wife, Susanne. At a 4th of July party, a drunken Pearl humiliates Tammy by making rude comments about her weight and appearance in front of all the guests. After Tammy runs off to the dock near the house's lake, Lenore follows her with both comfort and some tough love.

Tammy brings coffee to Pearl and unsuccessfully tries waking her up, but Tammy assumes she is dead. She, Lenore, and Susanne grieve Pearl's death, but Pearl awakens. Pearl was actually unconscious having drunk a large amount of alcohol the previous night. A relieved Tammy demands Pearl to get help for her drinking problem, just before she's taken to the hospital. The police arrive as well, and Tammy is arrested for robbing Topper Jack's.

After being released 38 days later, Tammy declines her father Don's offer to kill Greg for her. Returning home, Tammy finds that Greg and Missi have packed her belongings. She and Greg agree to an amicable divorce. She walks down the street to her parents' place and learns that Pearl is now living in Brookview Retirement Home. Tammy goes to Brookview to break her out, but Pearl is actually happy there. She has been attending Alcoholics Anonymous meetings at the home, and she is dating one of the men there. However, they take a trip to Niagara Falls.

At Niagara Falls, Bobby surprises Tammy there and they kiss. Tammy tells him about her choice to move to Louisville to get a fresh start in life and get closer to him. Missi leaves Greg to be with Keith and Tammy befriends Becky and Larry.

== Cast ==
- Melissa McCarthy as Tammy Banks, the titular character
- Susan Sarandon as Pearl Balzen, Tammy's maternal grandmother
- Allison Janney as Deb, Tammy's mother
- Dan Aykroyd as Don, Tammy's father
- Kathy Bates as Lenore, Pearl's cousin
- Gary Cole as Earl Tillman, Pearl's love interest
- Mark Duplass as Bobby Tillman, Earl's son and Tammy's love interest
- Toni Collette as Missi Jenkins, Tammy's neighbor
- Sandra Oh as Susanne, Lenore's wife
- Nat Faxon as Greg Banks, Tammy's husband and Missi's love interest
- Ben Falcone as Keith Morgan, Tammy's supervisor at a local Topper Jack's Fast Food
- Sarah Baker as Becky, an employee at the Topper Jack's, where Tammy commits a robbery
- Rich Williams as Larry, an employee at the Topper Jack's, where Tammy commits a robbery
- Mark L. Young as Jesse
- Mia Rose Frampton as Karen
- Steve Little as Jet Ski Renter
- Steve Mallory as Cashier
- Damon Jones as Jerry Miller
- Sandy McCarthy as one of two ladies leaving bar

== Production ==
On November 17, 2011, was reported that New Line Cinema acquired Melissa McCarthy's script Tammy, about an overweight woman who is laid off from her job, discovers her husband is having an affair, and decides to go on a road trip with her alcoholic, foul-mouthed, diabetic grandmother. Tate Taylor and Beth McCarthy-Miller were in talks to direct the project, but the deals were never done and Melissa McCarthy's husband, Ben Falcone was chosen to direct the film.

=== Casting ===
On October 18, 2012, it was announced that Shirley MacLaine had been offered the role of Tammy's diabetic grandmother, but the deal never came to fruition due to her scheduling conflicts with the TV series Downton Abbey. Debbie Reynolds was also considered for the role. On March 20, 2013, Susan Sarandon took the role of the grandmother. Sarandon wore prosthetic ankles to reflect her character's diabetes. Kathy Bates joined the cast to play the grandmother's lesbian cousin. (Note: Both Sarandon and Bates had guest starring roles on the CBS sitcom Mike & Molly, in which McCarthy played the female lead.) In March 2013, Mark Duplass joined the cast as Tammy's love interest. On April 4, Allison Janney was cast to play Tammy's mother. On April 5, Dan Aykroyd joined the cast of the film.

=== Filming ===
Principal photography began May 3, 2013, in Wilmington, North Carolina. Other filming locations include the surrounding areas of Shallotte, North Carolina, Castle Hayne, North Carolina and Boiling Spring Lakes, North Carolina. Also brief footage was filmed in Louisville, Kentucky and Niagara Falls, New York.

== Release ==
The first official full-length trailer of the film was released on May 6, 2014. On June 3, three posters for the film were released. On June 16, the UK trailer for the film was revealed. The film was released in July 2014.

=== Box office ===
Tammy grossed $84.5 million in North America and $16 million in other territories for a total gross of $100.3 million, against its $20 million budget. The film grossed $6.2 million on its opening day, and $21.6 million in its opening weekend, finishing second place at the box office (behind Transformers: Age of Extinction).

== Reception ==
On Rotten Tomatoes, the film has an approval rating of 24% based on 185 reviews with an average rating of 4.4/10. The site's critical consensus reads, "Melissa McCarthy remains an engaging screen presence, but her efforts aren't enough to keep the jumbled Tammy on track." On Metacritic, the film has a score of 39 out of 100 based on 36 critics, indicating "generally unfavorable reviews". Audiences polled by CinemaScore gave the film an average grade of "C+" on an A+ to F scale.

Ian Buckwalter of NPR gave the film a mixed review saying "Tammy never quite manages to find that balance between the sweet and the smartass the way Bridesmaids did, nor does the mismatched buddy dynamic between McCarthy and Sarandon ever approach the success of The Heat. But eventually the film does manage to find its own awkward way, with enough effective and less desperate jokes to smooth things over after the rocky start. It's a shakier debut of McCarthy and Falcone's efforts behind the camera than one might have hoped for, but if Tammy can turn things around, surely they can too." Eden Caceda of Filmink gave a negative review, saying, "McCarthy plays the same foul-mouthed and distasteful character she's played in just about every movie since Bridesmaids."

=== Accolades ===
Award	Category	Recipient	Result
Palm Springs International Film Festival	Directors to Watch	Ben Falcone	Won
Alliance of Women Film Journalists	Actress Most in Need of a New Agent	Melissa McCarthy	Nominated
Teen Choice Awards	Choice Summer Movie Star	Melissa McCarthy	Nominated
People's Choice Awards	Favorite Comedic Movie Actress	Melissa McCarthy	Won
Golden Raspberry Awards	Worst Actress	Melissa McCarthy	Nominated
Golden Raspberry Awards	Worst Supporting Actress	Susan Sarandon	Nominated
GLAAD Media Awards	Outstanding Film - Wide Release		Nominated
Dorian Awards	Campy Flick of the Year		Nominated
