= Mike Mitchell (actor) =

American comedian and writer (born 1982)

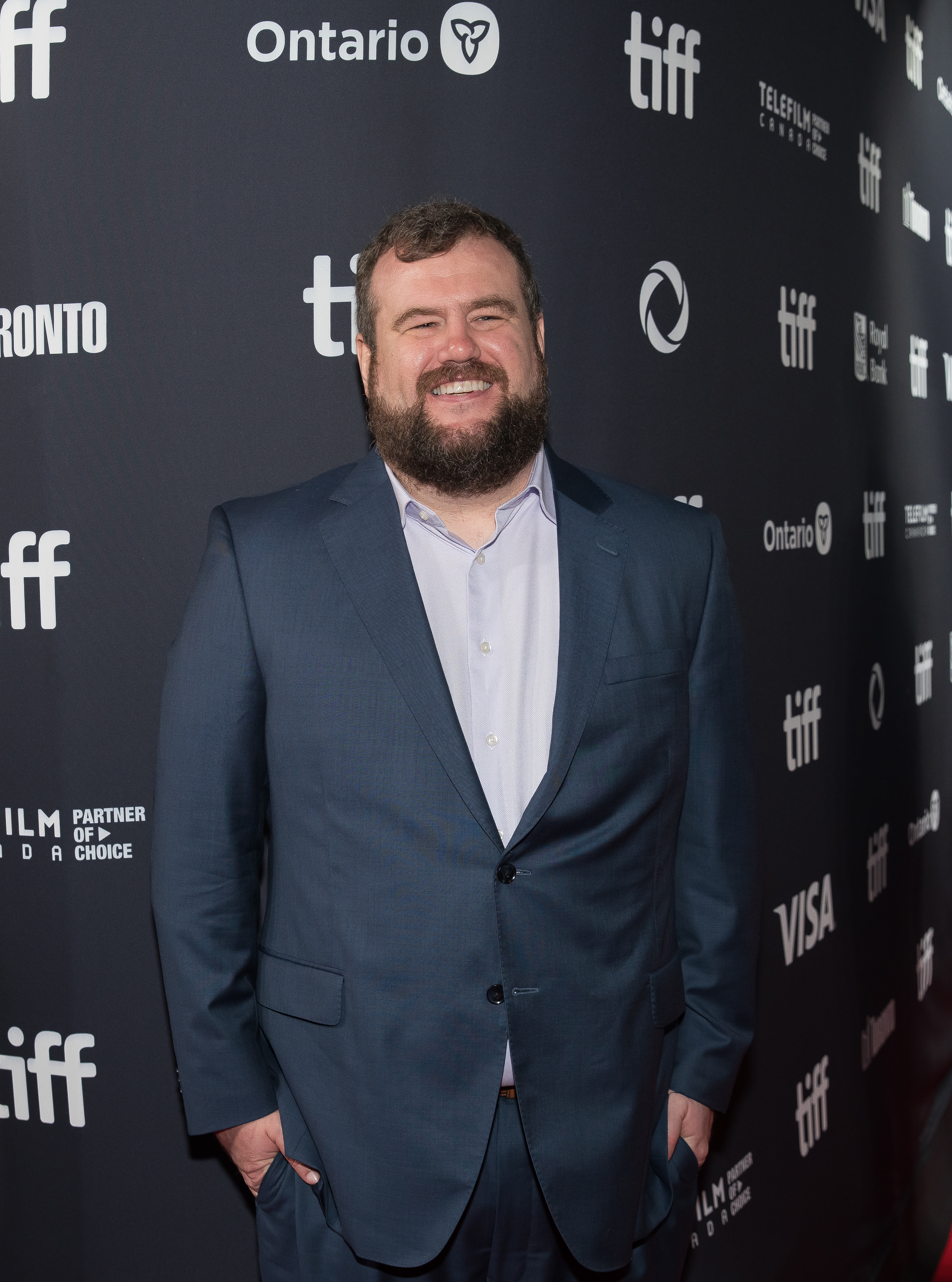
- Mitchell 2025
- Born: Michael Donovan Mitchell; October 6, 1982 (age 44); Quincy, Massachusetts, U.S.
- Education: Ithaca College
- Occupations: Actor; comedian; writer; podcaster
- Years active: 2010–present

Michael Donovan Mitchell (born October 6, 1982) is an American actor, comedian, and writer best known as a member of The Birthday Boys sketch comedy group. He is also known for his roles as Randy Monahan on the Netflix series Love, and Cowan in the Amazon Prime Video film The Tomorrow War. He currently co-hosts the podcast Doughboys (with comedian and writer Nick Wiger), which reviews and discusses chain restaurants.

== Early life ==
Mitchell was raised in Quincy, Massachusetts. He briefly attended Thayer Academy before graduating from North Quincy High School. He attended Ithaca College, graduating in May 2005.

== Career ==
Mitchell started as an improv and sketch comedian at the Upright Citizens Brigade Theater (UCB) in Los Angeles.

He went on to write and star in The Birthday Boys for IFC which aired for two seasons. During this time he also appeared on NBC's Parks and Recreation and IFC's Comedy Bang! Bang! In 2014, he played a fictionalized version of himself in the short film The Badger's Promise, the directorial debuts of friends Harris Wittels and Armen Weitzman.

Mitchell was the head writer of Hidden America with Jonah Ray on the Seeso streaming service, and had the recurring role of Randy Monahan on the Netflix comedy series Love. He also played Cowan in the 2021 movie The Tomorrow War.

=== The Birthday Boys ===
In 2007, at UCB, Mitchell joined the sketch comedy group The Birthday Boys with Jefferson Dutton, Dave Ferguson, Mike Hanford, Tim Kalpakis, Matt Kowalick, and Chris VanArtsdalen. With the exception of Kowalick, all members of The Birthday Boys graduated from Ithaca College.

Mitchell and The Birthday Boys performed regularly at UCB and the group uploaded original sketches to their YouTube page.

The Birthday Boys gained notoriety within the LA comedy scene, appearing on Comedy Bang! Bang! and called Adam McKay's "favorite sketch group." The group met Bob Odenkirk through a show that Odenkirk's wife, Naomi Yomtov, created at UCB. They began collaborating with Odenkirk and were picked up for a sketch show, The Birthday Boys, at IFC, with Odenkirk and Ben Stiller as executive producers.

Mitchell featured frequently in The Birthday Boys sketches. His notable characters include Woosh, Pretty Dad, and September Santa. The series ran for two seasons before being canceled in 2014.

Mitchell still performs sketch comedy with The Birthday Boys and other projects.

=== Doughboys ===
Mitchell created the comedy podcast Doughboys with comedy writer Nick Wiger in 2015. Doughboys was named "The One Food Podcast to Start With" by pop culture site Vulture. The co-hosts review chain restaurants with a weekly guest, including Nicole Byer, Haley Joel Osment, Sarah Silverman, and all of the Birthday Boys, among others. His co-host, Nick Wiger invites listeners to submit roasts of Mitchell to be read at the beginning of each episode, which often involve pop culture references and puns based on food or physique.

As of early 2018, the podcast is no longer associated with Feral Audio and is now a member of the HeadGum network. Mitchell and Wiger use Patreon to bring exclusive paid Doughboys content to their subscribers beyond the weekly episodes. As of June 2019, the Doughboys Patreon is the 9th most popular podcast Patreon and the 25th most popular Patreon in general.

== Filmography ==
=== Film ===
| Year | Title | Role | Notes |
|---|---|---|---|
| 2015 | Freaks of Nature | Slushy Douche | |
| 2016 | Other People | Donnie | |
| 2020 | Desperados | Sweaty Beard | |
| 2021 | The Tomorrow War | Cowan | |
| 2023 | Heightened | Mitch | |
| 2024 | Fear of Flying | Mark | |
| 2024 | Micro Budget | Mike | |
| 2025 | Maddie's Secret | Bloody Patient | |
| 2025 | The Napa Boys | Mitch Mitchellson | |
| 2026 | Sender | Steve | |
| 2026 | She Keeps Me Young | Rocky | |

=== Television ===
| Year | Title | Role | Notes |
|---|---|---|---|
| 2011–14 | Parks and Recreation | Bjorn Lerpiss | 6 episodes |
| 2012 | MyMusic | Guess | 3 episodes |
| 2012–16 | Comedy Bang! Bang! | Mitch / Lonny / Stagehand / Lugger | 12 episodes |
| 2013 | The Mindy Project | Brad | Episode: "Music Festival" |
| 2013 | The League | Police Officer | Episode: "Heavy Petting" |
| 2013–14 | The Birthday Boys | Various | Main |
| 2015 | W/ Bob and David | Virgin / Co-worker | 2 episodes |
| 2016 | The UCB Show | | With The Birthday Boys; Episode: "Eat That Pussy" |
| 2016 | Bajillion Dollar Propertie$ | Mitch | Episode: "Make Partner Part 1" |
| 2016 | Filthy Preppy Teen$ | Security Dave | 2 episodes |
| 2016 | Tween Fest | Rocco | 4 episodes |
| 2016 | The Simpsons | Boston Football Fan (voice) | Episode: "The Town" |
| 2016–17 | Hidden America with Jonah Ray | Chazz Duffy | 4 episodes |
| 2016–18 | Love | Randy Monahan | 22 episodes |
| 2017 | Michael Bolton's Big, Sexy Valentine's Day Special | Jack Sparrow Chorus | TV special |
| 2017 | Drive Share | | Episode: "Thanksgiving" |
| 2017 | Brooklyn Nine-Nine | Kyle Murphy | Episode: "The Favor" |
| 2018 | Alone Together | Jake | Episode: "Pilot" |
| 2018 | The Late Late Show with James Corden | Dennis | Episode: "David Duchovny/Henry Winkler/Billy Corgan" |
| 2018 | Little Big Awesome | Various voices | 4 episodes |
| 2019 | Craig Fixada America | Benjamin Franklin | Unknown episodes |
| 2020 | Brews Brothers | Jack | 5 episodes |
| 2021 | Kevin Can F**k Himself | Bert | Episode: "Fixed" |
| 2022 | Resident Alien | Creepy Boss | Episode: "Girls' Night" |
| 2022 | Dicktown | (voice) | Episode: "The Mystery of the Marauding Mascot" |
| 2022–23 | Killing It | Dean Trovia | 3 episodes |
| 2023–2025 | Twisted Metal | Stu | Recurring role |
| 2026 | Kevin | Various voice roles | 5 episodes |
| 2026 | The Comeback | Zeke | 6 episodes |
| 2026 | Bad Thoughts | Teddy | Episode: "Bad Decisions" |

=== Music videos ===
| Year | Title | Artist | Ref. |
|---|---|---|---|
| 2018 | "Today Is The Day" | EELS | |
| 2020 | "Are We Alright Again" | EELS | |
| 2022 | "Matilda" (dir. Jefferson Dutton) | PUP | |
