= Doughboys (podcast) =

Chain restaurant review podcast

- Doughboys cover art
- Genre: Comedy; Food
- Language: English

Cast and voices
- Hosted by: Mike Mitchell; Nick Wiger

Music
- Theme music composed by: Michael Daniel Cassady

Production
- Production: Emma Erdbrink; Amelia Marino; Robert Persinger (former); Yusong Liu (former)
- Length: 90–160 minutes

Technical specifications
- Audio format: MP3

Publication
- No. of episodes: 549 (as of June 18, 2026)
- Original release: May 20, 2015
- Provider: Feral Audio (2015–2018); Headgum (2018–present)
- Updates: Weekly

Related
- Website: birdfuck.com

Doughboys is an audio podcast hosted by Mike Mitchell and Nick Wiger focused on reviewing chain restaurants, including fast food restaurants, fast casual restaurants, and sit-down restaurants. The podcast started in May 2015 and began offering bonus episodes for Patreon supporters in March 2017 under the name Doughboys Double. The theme music for both Doughboys and Doughboys Double were composed and produced by Michael Cassady. Doughboys joined the Headgum network in April 2018, after having previously been members of the Feral Audio network until its disbandment.

The podcast episodes feature a weekly guest, including notable people from the comedy world such as Scott Aukerman, Gillian Jacobs, Sarah Silverman, Ike Barinholtz, Kyle Mooney, Beck Bennett, Matt Besser, Matt Kowalick, Haley Joel Osment, Samoa Joe, Heather Anne Campbell, Lauren Lapkus, Bill Oakley, Paul Scheer, Jason Mantzoukas, John Hodgman, Paul F. Tompkins, Jesse Farrar, Chris Pratt, Kumail Nanjiani, Stephanie Beatriz, and D'Arcy Carden. Mitchell and Wiger have also performed live shows across the United States and in Canada.

As of July 2025, Doughboys is the 18th most popular podcast on Patreon and the 52nd most popular Patreon page overall, with over 19,000 subscribers.

== Format ==
Each episode begins with an introduction by Wiger, who gives some background information about the restaurant chain they are reviewing that week. Together with a guest, the hosts then discuss their recent visit to the restaurant as well as chain restaurants in general. Following this conversation about the food and their experience, they rate the chain on a scale from 0 to 5 "forks". If a person wants to specify their rating, they can also use "tines" as a way to give out .25, .50, .75 scores. If a restaurant gets above a 4.0 fork rating from each person on the episode, it becomes part of the "Golden Plate Club". If the restaurant gets 5 forks from every person it is in the "Platinum Plate Club". However, a restaurant's place in these clubs is not final and a chain can lose this distinction if it is reviewed again and receives lower ratings.

In addition to reviewing a chain restaurant each episode, the podcast includes recurring segments such as "Snack or Wack", in which the hosts and their guests determine if a food is worth eating, or "Drank or Stank", in which the hosts and their guests taste a beverage to determine if it is worth drinking. At the end of each episode, the hosts and guests respond to a question submitted by a listener.

== Reception ==
Doughboys has received recognition as both a comedy and a food podcast on best-of lists by Paste, Mashable, Uproxx, and Reader's Digest, among others. Paste named it the 12th best podcast of the 2010s.

Doughboys has also been covered extensively on Vulture and The A.V. Club. It appeared on Vulture's year-end list "The Year in Comedy Podcasts" in 2016, 2017, 2018 and 2019, and has been featured in its weekly series "This Week in Comedy Podcasts" several times. Vulture also named Doughboys "the one food podcast to start with". The A.V. Club included the podcast in its year-end podcasts list in 2015 and 2016, and has recommended multiple episodes in its weekly podcast column "Podmass".

The podcast won "Best Food Podcast" at the 4th iHeartRadio Podcast Awards in 2022, and was previously nominated in the same category at the 2nd iHeartRadio Podcast Awards in 2020.

== Episode list ==
=== 2015 ===
No.	Title	Original release date
1	"Chili's with Eva Anderson"	May 20, 2015
2	"Taco Bell with Jack Allison"	May 25, 2015
3	"IHOP with Alison Agosti"	May 28, 2015
4	"Outback Steakhouse with Jon Gabrus"	June 4, 2015
5	"Long John Silver's with Mary Holland"	June 11, 2015
6	"TGI Fridays with Jordan Morris"	June 17, 2015
7	"Chipotle with Mike Hanford"	June 25, 2015
8	"Umami Burger with Heather Anne Campbell"	July 2, 2015
9	"Carl's Jr./Hardee's with Ben Axelrad"	July 7, 2015
10	"Domino's with Matt Kowalick"	July 15, 2015
11	"Carrows with Erin Whitehead"	July 24, 2015
12	"Chick-Fil-A with Betsy Sodaro"	July 30, 2015
13	"Denny's with Farley Elliott"	August 6, 2015
14	"Original Tommy's with Jim Woods"	August 13, 2015
15	"Boston Market with Annie Mebane"	August 19, 2015
16	"In-N-Out Burger with Armen Weitzman"	August 27, 2015
17	"Subway with Fran Gillespie"	September 2, 2015
18	"Steak 'n Shake with Evan Susser"	September 9, 2015
19	"Buffalo Wild Wings with Matt Selman"	September 18, 2015
20	"Starbucks with Joe Saunders"	September 24, 2015
21	"L&L Hawaiian Barbecue with Eugene Cordero"	October 1, 2015
22	"Rockdoughberfest: Cabo Wabo Cantina with Julie Brister"	October 8, 2015
23	"Rockdoughberfest: Margaritaville with Mike Carlson"	October 15, 2015
24	"Rockdoughberfest: Hard Rock Cafe with Scott Gairdner"	October 21, 2015
25	"Rockdoughberfest: Rock & Brews with Zoe Jarman"	October 28, 2015
26	"Burger King with John Roy"	November 4, 2015
27	"Fuddruckers with Ryan Perez"	November 11, 2015
28	"Del Taco with Alan Yang"	November 19, 2015
29	"Wingstop with Emmy Blotnick"	December 3, 2015
30	"Arby's with Vanessa Ramos"	December 9, 2015
31	"Steak 'n Shake 2 with Evan Susser"	December 17, 2015

=== 2016 ===
No.	Title	Original release date
32	"Pizza Hut with Neil Campbell"	January 7, 2016
33	"Five Guys with Jefferson Dutton"	January 14, 2016
34	"California Pizza Kitchen with Eva Anderson"	January 21, 2016
35	"Krispy Kreme with Matt Besser"	January 28, 2016
36	"Togo's with Matty Smith"	February 4, 2016
37	"Panda Express with Tricia McAlpin"	February 11, 2016
38	"Mimi's Cafe with Georgia Hardstark"	February 18, 2016
39	"Panda Wendy's with Paul Rust"	February 25, 2016
40	"Tournament of Chompions: Carl's Jr/Hardee's vs. Fuddruckers with Jess McKenna"	March 3, 2016
41	"Tournament of Chompions: Eat-In Minisode"	March 9, 2016
42	"Tournament of Chompions: Steak n' Shake vs. Five Guys vs. Burger King with Michael Cassady"	March 10, 2016
43	"Tournament of Chompions: Carl's Jr/Hardee's vs. In-N-Out Burger with John Gemberling"	March 17, 2016
44	"Tournament of Chompions: Five Guys vs. Shake Shack (Minisode) with Evan Susser & Matty Smith"	March 23, 2016
45	"Tournament of Chompions: Wendy's vs. Shake Shack with Nicole Byer"	March 24, 2016
46	"Tournament of Chompions Finale: In-N-Out Burger vs. Shake Shack with Evan Susser"	March 31, 2016
47	"Veggie Grill with Nathan Barnatt"	April 7, 2016
48	"Chuck E. Cheese's with Erin McGathy"	April 14, 2016
49	"Sweetgreen with Siobhan Thompson"	April 21, 2016
50	"Hillstone with David Phillips"	April 28, 2016
51	"Olive Garden with Christine Nangle"	May 5, 2016
52	"Morton's The Steakhouse with Tim Kalpakis"	May 12, 2016
53	"Yoshinoya with Jensen Karp"	May 19, 2016
54	"Popeye's Louisiana Kitchen with Lesley Arfin"	May 26, 2016
55	"Baja Fresh with Claudia O'Doherty"	June 2, 2016
56	"Jollibee with Jonah Ray"	June 9, 2016
57	"Hokkaido Ramen Santouka with Jeff Kenji Sloniker"	June 16, 2016
58	"Pinkberry with Lauren Lapkus"	June 23, 2016
59	"Islands with Nick Mundy"	June 23, 2016
60	"Bubba Gump Shrimp with Paul Scheer"	July 7, 2016
61	"Bob's Big Boy with Dave Ferguson"	July 14, 2016
62	"Fatburger with Yamara Taylor"	July 20, 2016
63	"7-Eleven with Fran Gillespie (Live from UCB Sunset)"	July 28, 2016
64	"Doughlympics: Domino's vs. Papa John's vs. Pizza Hut with Michael "Mookie" Blaiklock"	August 4, 2016
65	"Doughlympics: Chipotle vs. Del Taco vs. Taco Bell with Courtney Davis"	August 7, 2016
66	"Doughlympics: Dunkin' Donuts vs. McDonalds vs. Starbucks with Sean O'Connor"	August 18, 2016
67	"The Cheesecake Factory with Beck Bennett"	August 25, 2016
68	"Red Robin with D'Arcy Carden"	September 1, 2016
69	"Yogurtland with Van Robichaux"	September 8, 2016
70	"Dave & Buster's with Allan McLeod"	September 15, 2016
71	"Baskin-Robbins with Dave King"	September 22, 2016
72	"Dairy Queen with Christine Nangle & Matt Selman (Live at LA Podfest 2016)"	September 29, 2016
73	"Rocklobsterfest: Red Lobster 1 with Jess McKenna"	October 6, 2016
74	"Rocklobsterfest: Red Lobster 2 with Ross Kimball"	October 13, 2016
75	"Rocklobsterfest: Red Lobster 3 with Nicole Byer"	October 20, 2016
76	"Rocklobsterfest: Red Lobster 4 with Sean Clements & Hayes Davenport"	October 27, 2016
77	"Cold Stone Creamery with Kevin T. Porter"	November 2, 2016
78	"Wood Ranch with Esther Povitsky"	November 10, 2016
79	"Church's Chicken with Demi Adejuyigbe"	November 17, 2016
80	"Hooters with Kulap Vilaysack"	November 30, 2016
81	"Jack In The Box with Spencer Crittenden"	December 8, 2016
82	"Steak N' Shake 3 with Evan Susser"	December 15, 2016
83	"Rogueboys: Rogue One with Drew McWeeny"	December 22, 2016

=== 2017 ===
No.	Title	Original release date
84	"Tender Greens with Ryan Stanger"	January 6, 2017
85	"Buca di Beppo with Drew McWeeny"	January 12, 2017
85	"Tony Roma's with Bug Mane"	January 19, 2017
86	"Taco Bell (LIVE) with Jon Gabrus"	January 26, 2017
87	"Taco Bell 3 with Bobby Lee"	February 2, 2017
88	"BJ's with Sean Clements & Hayes Davenport"	February 9, 2017
89	"Mac To-Fight with Evan Susser & Van Robichaux"	February 15, 2017
90	"In-N-Out Burger 2 with ???"	February 23, 2017
91	"Tournament of Chompions: McDonald's v. Panda Express with Fran Gillespie"	March 2, 2017
92	"Tournament of Chompions: Chick-fil-a v. Wendy's with Ryan Perez"	March 6, 2017
93	"Tournament of Chompions: Full Bird Region with Eugene Cordero"	March 9, 2017
94	"Tournament of Chompions: Buffalo Wild Wings v. Wingstop with Nicole Byer"	March 13, 2017
95	"Tournament of Chompions: McDonald's v. Popeyes with Armen Weitzman"	March 16, 2017
96	"Tournament of Chompions: Wendy's v. Wingstop with Matt Selman"	March 23, 2017
97	"Tournament of Chompions: FINALS with Paul Rust"	March 30, 2017
98	"Jamba Juice with Dylan Gelula"	April 6, 2017
99	"Jimmy John's with Lauren Lapkus"	April 13, 2017
100	"Nugget Power Hour with Nicole Byer & Jon Gabrus"	April 20, 2017
101	"Wetzel's Pretzels with Jon Daly"	April 27, 2017
102	"Mr. Pizza with Jesse Thorn"	May 4, 2017
103	"Carl's Jr./Hardee's 2 with Chris VanArtsdalen"	May 11, 2017
104	"Sharky's with Erin McGathy"	May 18, 2017
105	"IKEA with Dave Thomason"	May 25, 2017
106	"The Coffee Bean with Hannah Kasulka"	May 31, 2017
107	"Jersey Mike's with Drew Tarver"	June 7, 2017
108	"Sizzler with Marisa Pinson"	June 15, 2017
109	"Burger King 2 with Jordan Morris (LIVE)"	June 22, 2017
110	"Claim Jumper with Heather Anne Campbell"	June 29, 2017
111	"Shake Shack with Jason Concepcion"	July 6, 2017
112	"Umami Burger 2 with David Neher"	July 12, 2017
113	"Golden Corral with Stoney Sharp"	July 20, 2017
114	"Dunkin' Donuts with Joe Mande"	July 27, 2017
115	"IHOP 2 with Danny Jelinek"	August 3, 2017
116	"Roscoe's House of Chicken and Waffles with Carl Tart"	August 10, 2017
117	"Daphne's with Jessica Jean Jardine"	August 17, 2017
118	"Chipotle 2 with Chelsea Davison"	August 24, 2017
119	"KFC with Paul F. Tompkins"	August 31, 2017
120	"HomeTown Buffet with Toni Charline"	September 7, 2017
121	"Shakey's Pizza with Kyle Mooney"	September 14, 2017
122	"El Pollo Loco with Lamar Woods"	September 21, 2017
123	"Guy's American Kitchen with Christine Nangle (LIVE)"	September 28, 2017
124	"Yard House with Matt Besser"	October 5, 2017
125	"ESPN Zone with Neil Campbell"	October 12, 2017
126	"Medieval Times with Mary Holland and Matt Newell"	October 19, 2017
127	"The Great Shrimp Off with Sean Clements and Hayes Davenport"	October 26, 2017
128	"Arby's 2 with John Hodgman"	November 2, 2017
129	"Wienerschnitzel with Rob Huebel"	November 9, 2017
130	"Dick's Drive-In with Evan Susser (LIVE)"	November 16, 2017
131	"Chick-fil-A with Noël Wells"	November 29, 2017
132	"Fosters Freeze with Holly Prazoff"	December 7, 2017
133	"Torchy's Tacos with Jon Gabrus (LIVE in Austin)"	December 14, 2017
134	"Cinnabon with Nicole Byer"	December 21, 2017

=== 2018 ===
No.	Title	Original release date
135	"Shipley Do-Nuts with Jon Gabrus (LIVE)"	January 11, 2018
136	"Carl's Jr./Hardee's 3 with Alana Johnston"	January 18, 2018
137	"Whataburger with Jon Gabrus (LIVE)"	January 25, 2018
138	"The Halal Guys with Dave Schilling"	February 1, 2018
139	"Checkers and Rally's with Neil Punsalan"	February 8, 2018
140	"Sugarfish with Jason Mantzoukas"	February 15, 2018
141	"Ike's with Spencer Grittenden (LIVE)"	February 22, 2018
142	"Munch Madness: Domino's vs. Pizza Hut with Claudia O'Doherty"	March 1, 2018
143	"Munch Madness: Little Caesars vs. Papa John's with John Gemberling"	March 8, 2018
144	"Munch Madness: Semifinals Match 1 with Carl Tart"	March 15, 2018
145	"Munch Madness: Semifinals Match 2 with Michael Daniel Cassady"	March 22, 2018
146	"Munch Madness: Finals with Paul Scheer"	March 29, 2018
147	"Coco's with Alison Rosen"	April 5, 2018
148	"The Pie Hole with Marcy Jarreau"	April 12, 2018
149	"The Dopeboys 4/20 Smokestackular with Jon Gabrus"	April 19, 2018
150	"Farmer Boys with Nick Rutherford"	April 26, 2018
151	"Live Garden 2 with Joel Kim Booster"	May 3, 2018
152	"Ruth's Chris Steak House with Andrew Secunda"	May 10, 2018
153	"TGI Friday's 2 with The Sklar Brothers"	May 17, 2018
154	"Mr. Denny's Solo Menu with Matt Mira"	May 24, 2018
155	"Taco Bell 4 with Gillian Jacobs"	May 31, 2018
156	"Gus's World Famous Fried Chicken with Ben Gruber"	June 7, 2018
157	"Quizno's with Haley Joel Osment"	June 14, 2018
158	"Firehouse Subs with Mary Sohn"	June 21, 2018
159	"Norms with Jordan Morris"	June 28, 2018
160	"IHOb with Bug Mane"	July 5, 2018
161	"Panda Express 2 with Cristela Alonzo"	July 12, 2018
162	"Mel's Drive-In with Jon Gabrus (LIVE)"	July 19, 2018
163	"Panera Bread with Bill Oakley"	July 26, 2018
164	"Souplantation/Sweet Tomatoes with Kelly Nugent and Lindsay Katai"	July 12, 2018
165	"Pink's Hot Dogs with Alana Johnston (LIVE)"	August 9, 2018
166	"The Evan Susser Summer Ice Cream Invitational Finals with Evan Susser"	August 16, 2018
167	"P.F. Chang's with Jessica McKenna and Zach Reino"	August 23, 2018
168	"Johnny Rockets with Esther Povitsky"	August 30, 2018
169	"Wahoo's Fish Taco with Eliza Skinner"	September 6, 2018
170	"Outback Steakhouse 2 with Leann Bowen"	September 13, 2018
171	"Menchie's with Jackie Johnson"	September 20, 2018
172	"Benihana with D'Arcy Carden"	September 27, 2018
173	"Octdoughberblessed: In-N-Out vs Chick-Fil-A with Scott Auckerman"	October 4, 2018
174	"Octdoughberblessed: Canter's Deli with Evan Susser and David Phillips"	October 11, 2018
175	"Loving Hut with Raj Desai"	October 18, 2018
176	"Octdoughberblessed: Cracker Barrel with Betsy Sodaro"	October 25, 2018
177	"Maggiano's Little Italy with Kevin Pollak"	November 1, 2018
176	"Top Round Roast Beef"	November 8, 2018
177	"El Torito with Jack Allison"	November 15, 2018
178	"Dairy Queen 2 with Don't Stop or We'll Die"	November 29, 2018
179	"Rubio's with Mary Holland (LIVE)"	December 6, 2018
180	"Papa John's with Lamar Woods"	December 13, 2018
181	"McDonald's with Sarah Silverman"	December 20, 2018
182	"Doughboys Double 42 - A Very Doughboys Christmas"	December 27, 2018

=== 2019 ===
No.	Title	Original release date
185	"Poquito Mas with Dan Goor"	January 3, 2019
186	"Delta Sky Club with John Hodgman"	January 17, 2019
187	"The Hat with Betsy Sodaro and Mano Agapion (LIVE)"	January 24, 2019
188	"Cheba Hut with Jon Gabrus (LIVE)"	January 31, 2019
189	"Super Duper Burgers with Eliza Skinner & Jordan Morris (LIVE)"	February 7, 2019
190	"Smoke's Poutinerie with Alana Johnston (LIVE)"	February 14, 2019
191	"Little Caesars with John Ross Bowie"	February 21, 2019
192	"Native Foods with Tawny Newsome & Alex Kliner"	February 28, 2019
193	"Munch Madness: Chipotle vs. Qdoba with Toni Charline"	March 7, 2019
194	"Munch Madness: Poquito Mas vs. Taco Bell with Mike Hanford"	March 14, 2019
195	"Munch Madness: Qdoba vs Del Taco with Matt Apodaca"	March 21, 2019
196	"Munch Madness: Poquito Mas vs. Qdoba vs. Taco Bell with Nicole Byer"	March 28, 2019
197	"Sizzle Pie with Bill Oakley (LIVE)"	April 4, 2019
198	"Portillo's with Jon Gabrus & Christine Nagle (LIVE)"	April 11, 2019
199	"Lou Malnati's with Jon Gabrus & Christine Nagle (LIVE)"	April 18, 2019
200	"Episode 200 - Chili's Too with Eva Anderson"	April 25, 2019
201	"AMC Dine-In with Kevin Pollak and Jamie Fox"	May 2, 2019
202	"Sweetfin Poke with Payman Benz"	May 9, 2019
203	"Waffle House with Carl Tart (LIVE)"	May 16, 2019
204	"Hattie B's with Carl Tart (LIVE)"	May 23, 2019
205	"P. F. Chang's 2 with Kulap Vilaysack"	May 30, 2019
206	"Fogo de Chao with Candice King & Kayla Ewell"	June 6, 2019
207	"Ben & Jerry's with The Sloppy Boys"	June 13, 2019
208	"Al's Beef with Megan Batoon & Amir Blumenfeld (LIVE)"	June 20, 2019
209	"Which Wich? with Josh Gondelman"	June 27, 2019
210	"Starbucks Reserve with Jessica Chaffin"	July 4, 2019
211	"Papa Gino's with John Hodgman, Jean Grae, and Jeff Tweedy"	July 11, 2019
212	"Le Pain Quotidien with Johnny Pemberton"	July 18, 2019
213	"SHAQ WEEK: Shaquille's with Josh Weiner"	July 25, 2019
214	"Subway 2 2019 with R. J. Fried"	August 1, 2019
215	"Del Taco 2 with Kevin Bartelt & Yusong Liu"	August 8, 2019
216	"Lee's Sandwiches with Ify Nwadiwe"	August 15, 2019
217	"Burger King 3 with Haley Mancini"	August 22, 2019
218	"Popeyes Louisiana Kitchen 2 with Andrew Ti"	August 29, 2019
219	"Ben's Chili Bowl with Christine Nangle & Carl Tart (LIVE)"	September 5, 2019
220	"CAVA with Jamelle Bouie, Carl Tart, and Libby Watson (LIVE)"	September 12, 2019
221	"Marie Callender's with Scott Aukerman"	September 19, 2019
222	"Rita's Italian Ice with Carl Tart & Christine Nangle (LIVE)"	September 26, 2019
223	"The Ate-TL: The Flying Biscuit Cafe with Steve Agee"	October 3, 2019
224	"The Ate-TL: Moe's Southwest Grill with Mary Lynn Rajskub"	October 10, 2019
225	"The Ate-TL: The Varsity with Joe Saunders"	October 17, 2019
226	"The Ate-TL: Krystal with Sam Richardson"	October 24, 2019
227	"The Ate-TL: Cook Out with Jesse Farrar & Mike Hale"	October 31, 2019
228	"White Castle with Mike Hanford, Paul Rust, and Fran Gillespie (LIVE)"	November 7, 2019
229	"Regina Pizzeria with John Hodgman & Nicole Byer (LIVE)"	November 14, 2019
230	"99 Restaurant with Nicole Byer & Dano (LIVE)"	November 21, 2019
231	"Noah's New York Bagels with Jennie Pierson"	December 5, 2019
232	"Ample Hills Creamery with Jason Sheridan"	December 12, 2019
233	"Steak 'n Shake 4 with Evan Susser"	December 19, 2019

== See also ==
- List of food podcasts
