= The Sloppy Boys =

Comedy rock band and podcast

- Also known as: The Sloppy Boys Jangly Band
- Origin: Los Feliz, California, United States
- Genres: Comedy rock; pop rock; post-punk; yacht rock; electronic
- Years active: 2013–present
- Labels: Kerchow Records; Independent
- Members: Jefferson Dutton; Mike Hanford; Tim Kalpakis
- Website: thesloppyboys.com

The Sloppy Boys are an American comedy rock band formed in Los Feliz, Los Angeles in 2013. The band consists of former members of The Birthday Boys Tim Kalpakis, Mike Hanford, and Jefferson Dutton. The trio also have a cocktail podcast by the same name.

Though they label themselves a "party rock band," the indie-DIY group blends pop rock and post-punk with yacht rock, experimental, and electronic influences. They were also the subject of Blood, Sweat and Beers, a 2023 documentary film following the band's five days of recording their album Sonic Ranch with producer Money Mark at Sonic Ranch Studios in West Texas.

The Sloppy Boys evolved from The Sloppy Boys Jangly Band, a Weezer cover band they formed to open a backyard concert. Later, The Sloppy Boys shortened their name and established themselves as part of the Los Angeles comedy rock movement, soon touring with Harris Wittels, Paul Rust, and Michael Cassady of Don't Stop or We'll Die.

== Music ==
=== Formation ===
Though they met at Ithaca College in Ithaca, New York, The Birthday Boys sketch comedy group formed at the Upright Citizens Brigade Theatre following their graduation and subsequent move to Hollywood, Los Angeles.

During the taping of their self-titled TV show for IFC, the majority of the Birthday Boys lived together in a home they called "the Stink House" on Fredonia Drive in Los Feliz. At the end of their lease in 2013, Dutton, Hanford, and Kalpakis hosted a backyard party called "Fredonia Fest". Needing an opening act for the party, they decided to play covers as The Sloppy Boys Jangly Band, later shortened to The Sloppy Boys.

During this time, Hanford made appearances on the Comedy Bang! Bang! podcast. All three Sloppy Boys worked and appeared on its TV adaptation by the same name, Comedy Bang! Bang!.

In 2018, the band started writing original music. Originally, the band would rotate instrumentation between songs with Kalpakis primarily playing the drums. The Sloppy Boys would later return to the Comedy Bang! Bang! podcast to promote their 2019 album, Dancing on the Wind.

=== Members ===
- Mike Hanford – lead and backing vocals, lead and rhythm guitar, bass, percussion
- Tim Kalpakis – lead and backing vocals, lead and rhythm guitar, bass, percussion
- Jefferson Dutton – percussion, backing and lead vocals, lead and rhythm guitar, bass, tenor saxophone

=== Discography ===
- Lifelong Vacation (2018)
- Dancing on the Wind (2019)
- Paradiso (2020)
- Sonic Ranch (2023)

== Comedy podcast ==
Still locked down and following the momentum of the Summer 2020 "zoom rooms" they used to promote Paradiso, The Sloppy Boys decided to start a comedy podcast about cocktails, drinking their way through the List of IBA official cocktails by the International Bartenders Association. Their bonus show, The Sloppy Boys Blowout, launched on Patreon the same day and covers subjects ranging from tour recaps to old movies.

While the "boys" theme across project names is unintentional, The Sloppy Boys share much of their audience with Doughboys, a comedy food review podcast by fellow Birthday Boy Mike Mitchell.

== Documentary ==
KFOX-TV journalist Robert Holguin directed the 2023 film Blood, Sweat and Beers, or How the Sloppy Boys Made an Album on a Farm in West Texas. The film followed The Sloppy Boys over the course of five days of high-speed music production at Sonic Ranch Studios with Beastie Boys producer Money Mark.

Often shortened to Blood, Sweat and Beers, the documentary won the Audience Award at the El Paso Film Festival.

== Tours and performances ==
The sloppy boys have been on tour almost constantly since 2021, with a year off in 2023.

- 2019 East Coast tour
- 2019 Midwest Tour
- 2021 Eastern Hemisphere Tour
- 2022 The Great Atlantic Blowout Tour
- 2022 The Great Pacific Blowout Tour
- Summer 2024 Midwest tour
- Fall 2024 West Coast Podcast tour
- Spring 2025 East Coast Podcast tour
- Spring 2025 West Coast tour
- Fall 2025 Midwest tour
- Spring 2026 Southern tour
