= Neil Campbell (producer) =

Producer, comedian and writer

- Education: University of Iowa
- Occupations: Producer, comedian, actor, writer
- Years active: 2005–present
- Spouse: Fran Gillespie

Neil Campbell is a producer, comedian, actor, and writer, who served as artistic director of the Upright Citizens Brigade Theatre in Los Angeles, CA from 2008 to 2012. Campbell has worked as a producer and writer on shows including Comedy Bang! Bang! and Brooklyn Nine-Nine.

== Early life ==
Campbell attended the University of Iowa, where he met frequent collaborator, Paul Rust.

== Career ==
Campbell has written and performed at the Upright Citizens Brigade Theatre in Los Angeles, CA since it opened in 2005, and served as artistic director from 2008 to 2012. Campbell often performed with actor Paul Rust at the Upright Citizens Brigade Theatre, including co-hosting the long-running Not Too Shabby open-mic sketch show.

Campbell served as an executive producer, writer, and actor on IFC's Comedy Bang! Bang! Campbell wrote for the 2015 Primetime Emmy Awards with the entire Comedy Bang! Bang! writing staff. Campbell had been a supervising producer on Brooklyn Nine-Nine since 2017 until its final season in 2021. He also had a recurring role on the Netflix show Love as Kyle.

== Filmography ==
Year	Title	Role	Notes
2006	Cheap Seats: Without Ron Parker	Canadian Violent Hugger	Episode: "Amazing Games: International Toughmen"
2009	2009 MTV Movie Awards	Armless Man	TV special; also writer
2009	Reno 911!	Cap'n Crabby's Manager	2 episodes
2010	The Sarah Silverman Program	Customer #1	Episode: "Smellin' of Troy"
2012–16	Comedy Bang! Bang!	Various	23 episodes; also writer and producer
2013	Monsters University	Additional voices	
2013	Parks and Recreation	Lerf Kormhyurt	Episode: "Gin It Up!"
2015	The Simpsons	Writer	Episode: "The Musk Who Fell to Earth"
2016	The UCB Show	Performer	Episode: "Bigfoot Sex"
2016	Bajillion Dollar Propertie$	Zach the Masseuse	Episode: "Happy Ending"
2016–18	Love	Kyle	4 episodes
2016–21	Brooklyn Nine-Nine	Ian Britches / Larry Britches / Barry Britches	3 episodes; also writer and producer
2023–present	Digman!	Snerdley Tootbottom / various (voice)	Also co-creator, writer, and executive producer
