= Armen Weitzman =

American actor and comedian (born 1983)

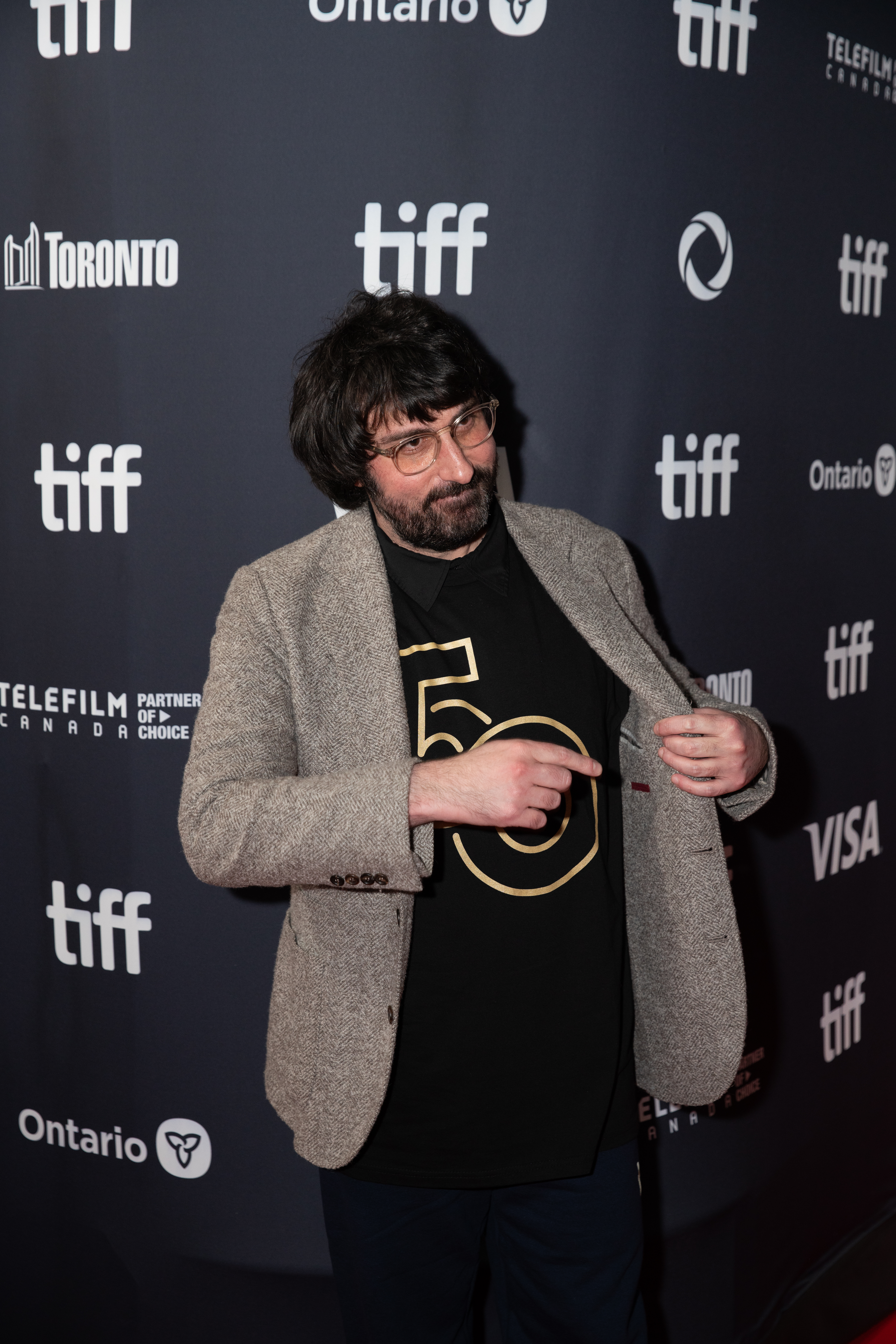
- Armen Weitzman 2025
- Born: December 19, 1983 (age 42); Los Angeles, California, U.S.
- Education: Emerson College
- Occupations: Actor; comedian; writer
- Parent: Howard Weitzman (father)
- Writing career
- Years active: 2000-present
- Website: www.armenweitzman.com

Armen Weitzman (born December 19, 1983) is an American actor and comedian best known for playing Garfield in the Comedy Central series Another Period as well as Miles Jr. in the franchise spoof The Napa Boys.

== Early life ==
Weitzman was born and raised in Los Angeles, California, the son of lawyer Howard Weitzman and Margaret. He is of Armenian and European Jewish descent. He attended Emerson College, where he met best friend and collaborator Harris Wittels, but did not graduate.

== Career ==
Weitzman is a regular performer at the Upright Citizens Brigade Theater in Los Angeles. He has appeared in television and film projects such as Burning Love, The Sarah Silverman Program, Childrens Hospital, Role Models, School for Scoundrels, Love, and Ocean's Thirteen. He was also on the short-lived MTV show Zach Stone Is Gonna Be Famous as the title character's best friend, Greg LeBlanc. In 2009, he starred in the Say Anything music video for "Shiksa (Girlfriend)". Alongside Wittels, Weitzman made his directorial debut in 2014 with the short film The Badger's Promise, which the pair also co-starred in as fictionalized versions of themselves. He co-starred as the servant Garfield in the Comedy Central show Another Period, and appeared as Jeff in Silicon Valley, as Ruby in Netflix's Love, and as Lorne Michaels in A Futile and Stupid Gesture.

Weitzman was awarded the Heart of a Chompion Award on the March 30, 2017, episode of the Doughboys podcast. Despite this, on the August 1, 2019, episode of Doughboys, Weitzman was formally banned from returning by hosts Nick Wiger and Mike Mitchell and guest R.J. Fried.

== Filmography ==
=== Film ===
Year	Title	Role	Notes
2006	The King of Central Park	Isaac	Short film; co-star with Henry Winkler, Weitzman's sibling's step-father
2006	Accepted	S. H. Testimonial Student	
2006	School for Scoundrels	Classmate	
2007	Ocean's Thirteen	Eugene	
2008	Over Her Dead Body	Tom	
2008	Role Models	Party Dude	
2011	No Strings Attached	Taxi Driver	
2014	The Badger's Promise	Armen	Short film; also co-writer and co-director with Harris Wittels
2017	Mr. Roosevelt	Andy	
2018	A Futile and Stupid Gesture	Lorne Michaels	
2018	In a Relationship	Jakob	
2025	The Napa Boys	Miles Jr.	Also Writer, Produced

=== Television ===
Year	Title	Role	Notes
2005	Trollz	Jasper Trollhound	Voice; credited as "Armen"; 17 episodes
2006	Cheap Seats without Ron Parker	Canadian Violent Hugger	Episode: "Amazing Games: International Toughmen"
2007	The Very Funny Show	Guy at Party	Episode: "Future Me"
2007–08	The Sarah Silverman Program	Armen / Clerk / Store Clerk	6 episodes
2009	The Quest for the Golden Hot Dog	Ron Wilton, Jr.	
2009	The Midnight Show		2 episodes
2010	Remember When	Tomás	
2010	Childrens Hospital	Dr. Fantastic / Dr. Frantastic	2 episodes
2010–12	The Back Room	Cuddle Bear	Main; 25 episodes
2011	Greek	Jim Carnes	3 episodes
2012	Suburgatory	Troy	Episode: "The Great Compromise"
2013	Burning Love	Hathwell Crisping	13 episodes
2013	Zach Stone Is Gonna Be Famous	Greg LeBlanc	Main; 12 episodes
2013	NTSF:SD:SUV	Raj	Episode: "TGI Murder"
2013–15	Comedy Bang! Bang!	Thénardier / Tombstone Maker	2 episodes
2013–18	Another Period	Garfield	Main; 32 episodes; Walter in unaired pilot
2014	Newsreaders	Oz Foss	Episode: "Band Names-R-Us; Put Me in Coach"
2016–18	Love	Ruby	9 episodes
2017	I'm Dying Up Here	Rob Cheevers	Episode: "Pilot"
2018	Silicon Valley	Jeff	4 episodes
2019	Veep	Male Sensitivity Trainer	Episode: "Pledge"
2019	GLOW	Jonathan	2 episodes

=== Music videos ===
Year	Title	Artist	Ref.
2009	"Girlfriend (Shiksa)"	Say Anything	
