= Nicole Byer =

American comedian and actress (born 1986)

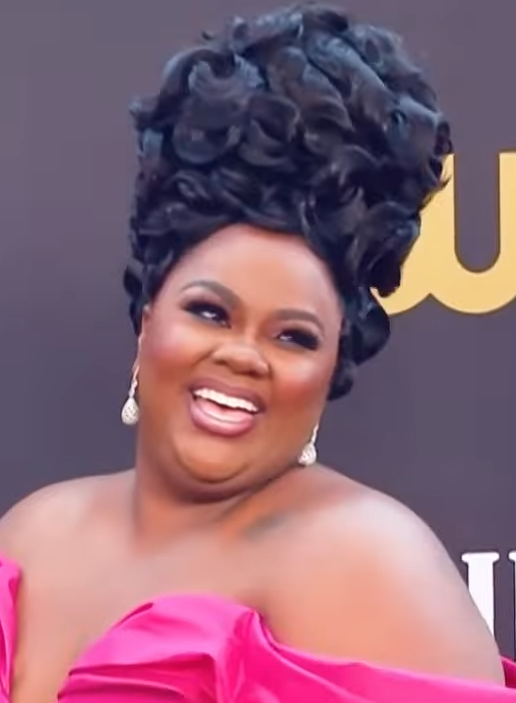
- Byer in 2022
- Born: August 29, 1986 (age 40); Middletown Township, New Jersey, U.S.
- Occupations: comedian; actress; television host; podcaster
- Years active: 2009–present
- Known for: Nailed It! Loosely Exactly Nicole; Girl Code; Why Won't You Date Me?
- Website: nicolebyerwastaken.com

Nicole Byer (born August 29, 1986) is an American comedian, actress, and television host. She is known as the host of the Netflix comedic reality bake-off series Nailed It! (2018–22), for which she has received four Primetime Emmy Award nominations.

Byer gained recognition for her work in the commentary series Girl Code (2013). Byer later starred in the MTV/Facebook Watch comedy series Loosely Exactly Nicole (2016–18), which was based on her real life experiences. She made several guest appearances in such comedy series as 30 Rock (2012), Family Guy (2016), Transparent (2016–17), The Good Place (2019), Brooklyn Nine-Nine (2019–21), and The Simpsons (2019). She also appeared in films, including Other People (2016), All About Nina (2018), Bad Hair (2020), and Valley Girl (2020). In 2021, Byer began co-hosting Wipeout with John Cena.

Byer is the host of the Headgum podcast Why Won't You Date Me?, the Earwolf podcast Best Friends co-hosted with Sasheer Zamata, and the Headgum podcast Newcomers.

Byer's first full-length special, Nicole Byer: BBW (Big Beautiful Weirdo), premiered on Netflix in December 2021 and earned her an Emmy nomination for Outstanding Writing for a Variety Special.

== Early life ==
Byer was born and raised in New Jersey and moved to New York City in the early 2000s. She worked there as a waitress for a restaurant and cabaret club. She described how the experience eventually led to her to studying improv, "They would give me a lot of money because they were like, 'You're very funny. You have to get out of here. You're very bad at this [waiting tables].'" Byer's parents both died when she was young, her mother while Nicole was a teen in high school, and her father when she was 21. She has said that comedy helped her work through both her parents' deaths, "it was a blessing that I had found these things before they passed away so I could escape."

She then took classes at the Upright Citizens Brigade, starting improv and sketch comedy in June 2008, the same month that her father died. She continued with improv and sketch comedy before starting her stand-up career in 2013. Byer graduated from the American Musical and Dramatic Academy Certificate Program in Professional Performance.

== Career ==
She tours the United States doing stand-up comedy and regularly performs improv with Upright Citizens Brigade in Los Angeles.

=== TV ===
Byer began appearing on Girl Code on MTV in 2013. In 2014, she hosted the first season of MTV's Are You the One? The Aftermatch Live, an after-show for Are You the One?. She appeared in several roles on network television in 2016. That year, she had supporting roles on three shows: MTV's commentary show Girl Code; a hidden camera prank show Ladylike, also on MTV; and she was a series regular on the Fox show Party Over Here, a half-hour sketch comedy created by Paul Scheer and Lonely Island, which was cancelled after one season. As a commentator on the show Girl Code, she was described by Maitri Mehta at Bustle as a "beloved talking head"; Stephanie Merry at The Washington Post called Byer "one of the most dependably funny commentators" on the show. Early in her career, Byer learned to do her own makeup and hairstyling before performances, after experiences with on-set makeup artists and hairstylists unprepared to work with her skin tone and hair texture.

Byer has guest-starred in several shows including BoJack Horseman, Transparent, and Bob's Burgers. She played Lizette in season 5, episode 7 of the Freeform series Young & Hungry in 2017. She appeared as a guest judge on the third season of RuPaul's Drag Race: All Stars.

==== Nailed It! ====
Since March 2018, Byer has hosted the Netflix original bake-off series Nailed It! alongside head judge chocolatier Jacques Torres. Each episode features three home bakers with a "terrible track record" attempting to recreate extremely complicated pastries for a $10,000 prize. Byer received a nomination for the Primetime Emmy Award for Outstanding Host for a Reality or Competition Program four times (2020, 2021, 2022, and 2023). She is the first Black woman to be nominated in the category.

Because her comedy is "not kid-friendly", her commentary is edited to create the "feel-good G-rated comedy" that the show is known for. An entire season is shot in only 13 days.

==== Loosely Exactly Nicole ====
In 2016, MTV premiered Loosely Exactly Nicole, a scripted, single-camera comedy written and starring Byer, based on her life. Madeleine Davies at Jezebel described the show's premise as a "comedic look on [Byer's] life as a black actress struggling to make it in Hollywood." Loosely Exactly Nicole premiered September 5, 2016, on MTV. It was later cancelled after one season. Shortly after, it was picked up by Facebook Watch for a second season.

==== Wipeout ====
Since 2023, Byer has been the co-host of Wipeout with John Cena on TBS.

=== Podcasts ===
Byer is the host of four podcasts: Why Won't You Date Me?, Best Friends!, 90 Day Bae, and Newcomers.

==== Why Won't You Date Me? ====
In December 2017, Byer launched a weekly podcast Why Won't You Date Me? on the HeadGum podcast network. Each episode features a guest, typically another comedian, with whom Byer converses openly about her limited dating history, past sexual experiences, and frustration with being single. The guest also critiques her Tinder profile. Byer concludes each show by asking the guest host if they would date her. Past guests include her very close friend Sasheer Zamata, Emily Heller, and Brooks Wheelan. Critics have referred to the show as "bold" and "refreshing." In 2021, the show left HeadGum to join Conan O'Brien's Team Coco podcast network. In 2024, the show was back to HeadGum and acquired by them.

==== Best Friends! ====
In 2019, Byer, alongside Sasheer Zamata, launched a podcast on the Earwolf podcast network, Best Friends, a weekly podcast in which the two ruminate on the nature of friendship. The same year, Byer joined comedian and actor Mano Agapion as a co-host on the RuPaul's Drag Race recap podcast Drag Her, and became a cohost of the 90 Day Fiance recap podcast 90 Day Bae with Marcy Jarreau.

==== Newcomers ====
In 2020, Byer launched a weekly podcast, Newcomers, on the HeadGum podcast network alongside Lauren Lapkus, in which the two friends watch films for the first time and comment on their feelings on each movie as newcomers to the series. Each episode features a guest who provides more background on the series and characters. Past guests have included John Gemberling, Demi Adejuyigbe, Paul F. Tompkins, and Betsy Sodaro.

Season one covered the Star Wars franchise and The Lord of the Rings in the second. The third season explored Tyler Perry's body of work and the fourth goes through the Fast & Furious franchise, with a new co-host, Jon Gabrus as a guide. The fifth season covered selections from the Marvel Cinematic Universe and a sixth season has Byer and Lapkus experiencing various Batman films.

=== Book ===
Her first book #VERYFAT #VERYBRAVE: The Fat Girl's Guide to Being #Brave and Not a Dejected, Melancholy, Down-in-the-Dumps Weeping Fat Girl in a Bikini was released in 2020. The book features over 100 photos of Byer in bikinis with much of the book written through captions, making it both a comedy book and a photo book. Byer has explained the long title, "I, Nicole Byer, wrote this book to #1, share my impressive bikini collection and my hot body with the world, and #2, help other people feel #brave by embracing their body as it is." The title began as a joke hashtag on Instagram, making fun of the way people often comment on photos of fat women wearing relatively little clothing as, 'You're so brave.'

=== Other work ===
In 2013, Byer and Sasheer Zamata created and starred in a web series called Pursuit of Sexiness which was produced by Upright Citizens Brigade.

In 2018, she appeared in a Smirnoff ad campaign with actor Ted Danson.

== Comedic style ==
On The Ringer, Allison P. Davis described Byer's comedy: "Most easily compared to a raunchier Retta with a hint of Ilana Glazer's madcap energy. She's mouthy, vulgar, a little bit goofy, relatable but ridiculously charming, and not afraid to infuse her broad comedy with a confident sexuality." Writing for USA Today, Jaleesa M. Jones said that "it's precisely [Byer's] brazen, ribald brand of comedy that landed her in the creative incubator that is MTV, where she toplines two new comedy shows in 2016, Ladylike and Loosely Exactly Nicole".

Byer described Whoopi Goldberg, Tina Turner, and Mo'Nique as her early inspirations.

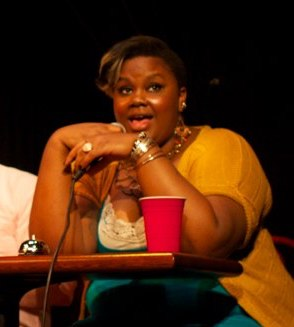
Nicole Byer

== Personal life ==
Byer supports body positivity and stated in an interview with Brit+Co, "Body positivity, to me, means you accept the body that you're in... And if you want to change it, you can, but you should love the skin that you're in currently, forever. Because everyone is beautiful. No one's truly ugly. You're always beautiful to somebody, and you're always ugly to somebody."

On her sexual orientation, Byer has said that she "doesn't identify as straight", but is uncomfortable with the labels "bisexual" or "queer." She has stated on her podcast Why Won't You Date Me? that she is open to dating people of any gender, and has dated men and women in the past.

She lives in Los Angeles with her rescue dog, Clyde. She previously lived with fellow comedian John Milhiser.

Byer was diagnosed with attention deficit hyperactivity disorder as an adult.

== Filmography ==
=== Film ===
Year	Title	Role	Notes
2014	A Better You	Neighbor	
2016	Other People	Charlie	
2016	Mike and Dave Need Wedding Dates	Office Nicole	
2018	All About Nina	Leslie	
2020	Bad Hair	Gina	
2020	Valley Girl	Deejay	
2021	Vivo	Valentina (voice)	
2022	Unplugging	Officer Dunn	
2022	The Bob's Burgers Movie	Olsen Benner (voice)	
2022	Mack & Rita	Urth	
2023	Ruby Gillman, Teenage Kraken	Janice (voice)	
2023	Good Burger 2	Luna Foxx	
2023	Urkel Saves Santa: The Movie	Sheryl (voice)	
2023	First Time Female Director	Cerritos	
2024	Thelma	Rochelle	
2024	The American Society of Magical Negroes	Dede	
2025	Summer of 69	Destiny	
2025	The Twits	Beverly Onion (voice)	
TBA	Transcending		Post-production

=== Television ===
Year	Title	Role	Notes
2012	30 Rock	Mo'Nique Lookalike	Episode: "Grandmentor"
2013	Girl Code	Herself	Unknown episodes
2013	For-Profit Online University	22MuchBIZ	Adult Swim special
2013–2014	The Birthday Boys	Nurse / Maurine	2 episodes
2013–2015	Pursuit of Sexiness	Nicky	11 episodes; Also writer
2014	Are You the One? The Aftermatch Live	Host	Season 1
2014	Friends of the People	Unknown	Episode: "Meet the Friends"
2015	Like, Share, Die	Miss Andry / Wendy Williams (voice)	2 episodes
2015	Comedy Bang! Bang!	Terri Herdsman	Episode: "Weird Al Yankovic Wears a Different Hawaiian Shirt"
2016	Angie Tribeca	Holly	Episode: "The Famous Ventriloquist Did It"
2016	Animals.	Stephanie (voice)	Episode: "Pigeons"
2016	Lady Dynamite	A.D. Fiona	2 episodes
2016	Party Over Here	Various	10 episodes
2016	Ladylike	Herself	8 episodes
2016	Family Guy	Airport Security Officer (voice)	Episode: "The Boys in the Band"
2016–2017	The UCB Show	Various	2 episodes
2016–2017	Transparent	Jataun	2 episodes
2016, 2018	BoJack Horseman	Interviewee / Talk Show Peahen / Teenage Girl (voice)	2 episodes
2016–2018	Loosely Exactly Nicole	Nicole Byer	20 episodes; Also writer and producer
2017	Celebrity Family Feud	Herself	Episode: "Funny Gals vs Funny Guys and Louie Anderson vs Christina Milian"
2017	Michael Bolton's Big, Sexy Valentine's Day Special	Security Guard #2	TV special
2017	Young & Hungry	Lizette	Episode: "Young & Bridesmaids"
2017–2018	Star vs. the Forces of Evil	Princess Arms / Princess Jaggs (voice)	3 episodes
2018–2022	Nailed It!	Herself (host)	56 episodes
2018	Bob's Burgers	Martha / Drunk Lounge Lady (voice)	Episode: "Go Tina on the Mountain"
2018	Little Big Awesome	Ho Cho Flo / Puppy Num Nums (voice)	Episode: "Puppy Shower/Claude the Buff Hamster"
2018–2020	RuPaul's Drag Race All Stars	Herself	Episodes: "All Stars Snatch Game", "Get a Room!"
2018–2020	Apple & Onion	Cotton Candy / Kid / Rude Fan (voice)	5 episodes
2018–2023	Big City Greens	Andromeda (voice)	10 episodes
2019	The Good Place	Gwendolyn	Episode: "The Book of Dougs"
2019	The Simpsons	Erica (voice)	Episode: "Bart vs. Itchy & Scratchy"
2019	Bajillion Dollar Propertie$	Mandine Chinton	Episode: "Missing Dean"
2019	A Black Lady Sketch Show	The Invisible Man	2 episodes
2019	Snoopy in Space	C.A.R.A. (voice)	11 episodes
2019–2022	Tuca & Bertie	Various voices	23 episodes
2019–2021	The Unicorn	Meg	3 episodes
2019–2021	Brooklyn Nine-Nine	Trudy Judy	3 episodes
2020	Lego Masters	Herself	Episode: "Storybook"
2020	American Dad!	Pickle House Customer (voice)	Episode: "Trophy Wife, Trophy Life"
2020	Game On!	Herself	Episode: "Celebrity Guests: Nicole Byer and David Ortiz"
2020	Mapleworth Murders	Julia Squift	Episode: "The Case of the Case of Wine: Part I"
2020	Amphibia	Gertie (voice)	2 episodes
2020	Archer	Gabrielle (voice)	Episode: "The Double Date"
2020	The George Lucas Talk Show	Herself	Episode: "Radioland Stream Night"
2020–2022	Woke	40 Oz. Bottle (voice)	4 episodes
2021	Close Enough	Ophira (voice)	Episode: "Where'd You Go, Bridgette?/The Erotic Awakening of A.P. LaPearle"
2021	Nicole Byer: BBW (Big Beautiful Weirdo)	Herself	Netflix special
2021	A Tale Dark & Grimm	Mrs. Baker (voice)	4 episodes
2021	Poorly Drawn Lines	Lizandra (voice)	Episode: "Dinner Party"
2021–2022	RuPaul's Drag Race	Herself	3 episodes, including "Menzeses"
2021–2022	Home Economics	Amanda Conley	3 episodes
2021–2025	Wipeout	Herself (co-host)	
2021–2026	Rugrats	Lucy Carmichael (voice)	Main role
2021–present	Invincible	Vanessa / Fiona (Season 1)	Voices; 2 episodes
2021–2023	Grand Crew	Nicky Koles	Main role
2021–2023	HouseBroken	Various voices	5 episodes
2022	Ada Twist, Scientist	Professor Flowerbomb (voice)	Episode: "Mind Over Muscle/Iggy Gettin' Diggy With It"
2022	The Boys Presents: Diabolical	Bree (voice)	Episode: "BFFs"
2022	Cursed Friends	Mikayla	Television film
2022	The Great North	Coach Kiely (voice)	4 episodes
2022	The Masked Singer	Herself	Episode: "Masking for a Duel – Round 2"
2022	Ziwe	Herself	Episode: "Socially Liberal, Fiscally Conservative"
2022	27th Critics' Choice Awards	Herself (host)	Television special
2022–2024	Trixie Motel	Herself	Two episodes
2022–2023	The Boss Baby: Back in the Crib	NannyCam No Filter CEO Baby (voice)	11 episodes
2023	Blaze and the Monster Machines	The Gas Guzzler (voice)	Episode: "Renewable Energy Racers"
2023	The Muppets Mayhem	Beatrice of the Beyhive	Episode: "Track 8: Virtual Insanity"
2023	Ten Year Old Tom	(voice)	Episode: "Nelson's Hot Mom/History Week"
2023	Survival of the Thickest	Herself	Episode: "Do The Right Thang, Bitch."
2023–2024	Velma	Blythe Rogers (voice)	10 episodes
2024	Dinner Time Live with David Chang	Herself	Episode: "The Meat Extravaganza"
2024	Star Trek: Lower Decks	Kassia Nox (voice)	2 episodes: "Starbase 80?!" & "The New Next Generation"
2025	Hollywood Squares (2025)	Herself (Guest)	3 episodes: "The Mayor of the Sun", "The Price Was Wrong, Drew", & It's a Hot Gentleman's Sweater". (In-Progress)
2025	Very Important People	Candice	Episode: "Candice"
2025	Long Story Short	Kendra Hooper	Main cast
2026	Chibiverse	Andromeda (voice)	Episode: "Mystery Busters"

=== Podcasts ===
Year	Title	Notes
2013	Before You Were Funny	Guest
2013	Doodie Calls with Doug Mand	Guest
2014–2017	Baby Geniuses	Guest; 4 episodes
2015	Can I Pet Your Dog?	Guest
2015	The Champs	Guest
2015–2017	Hollywood Handbook	Guest; 2 episodes
2015–2019	Lady to Lady	Guest; 2 episodes
2016–2023	Doughboys	Guest; 11 episodes
2016	Another Round	Guest
2016	Black Men Can't Jump [In Hollywood]	Guest
2016	The CONAN Podcast	Guest
2016	Don't Get Me Started	Guest
2016	Make Me Like It	Guest
2016	The MEAT Improv with Jake Jabbour and Josh Simpson	Guest
2016	No Joke	Guest
2016	Slate Daily Feed	Guest
2016–2019	High and Mighty	Guest; 5 episodes
2016–2023	How Did This Get Made?	Guest; 5 episodes
2017	The Bechdel Cast	Guest
2017	The Dumbbells	Guest
2017	Kar-Dishin' It: All Things Kardashian	Guest
2017	The Need to Fail with Don Fanelli	Guest
2017	Treks and the City	Guest
2017	Weird Adults with Little Esther	Guest
2017–2018	Natch Beaut	Guest; 2 episodes
2017–2019	I'm Too Effing High	Guest; 5 episodes
2017–2019	If I Were You	Guest; 2 episodes
2017–present	Why Won't You Date Me?	Host
2018	All Fantasy Everything	Guest
2018	The Big Listen	Guest; 2 episodes
2018	Comedy Bang! Bang!	Guest
2018	Everything is Rent	Guest
2018	A Funny Feeling	Guest
2018	Hysteria	Guest
2018	Inside the Disney Vault	Guest
2018	Off Book: The Improvised Musical	Guest
2018	Raised by TV	Guest
2018	The Soft Spot	Guest
2018	Spontaneanation	Guest
2018	This Particular Album is Very, Very Important to Me	Guest
2018	unBEARable with Big Dipper and Meatball	Guest
2018	Unhappy Hour with Matt Bellassai	Guest
2018	Unladylike	Guest
2018	Womp It Up!	Guest
2018	You're Making It Worse	Guest
2018–2020	Not Too Deep with Grace Helbig	Guest; 2 episodes
2019	Good One: A Podcast About Jokes	Guest
2019	Who's Your God?	Guest
2019	The Good Place: The Podcast	Guest
2019	Cool Playlist	Guest
2019	Be Here for a While	Guest
2019	Two Girls One Ghost	Guest
2019	The Worst with Greta Titelman	Guest
2019	Conan O'Brien Needs a Friend	Guest
2019	Three Questions with Andy Richter	Guest
2019	Scam Goddess	Guest
2019	A Mediocre Time with Tom and Dan	Guest
2019	And Especially You	Guest
2019	Worst Firsts with Brittany Furlan	Guest
2019	I Hate Talking About Myself	Guest
2019	Your Mom's House	Guest
2019	Air Jordan: A Food Podcast	Guest
2019	Gettin Better with Ron Funches	Guest
2019	Kreative Kontrol	Guest
2019	Punch Up The Jam	Guest
2019	Ghosted! by Roz Drezfalez	Guest
2019	Good for You with Whitney Cummings	Guest
2019	The Goodie Goodie with Sabrina Jalees	Guest; 2 episodes
2019	I'm Afraid of That	Guest
2019	Las Culturistas	Guest
2019–2020	It's Been a Minute with Sam Sanders	Guest
2019–2020	Forever35	Guest; 2 episodes
2019–2022	Sloppy Seconds with Big Dipper and Meatball	Guest; 2 episodes
2019–present	90 Day Bae	Co-host (with Marcy Jarreau)
2019–present	Drag Her	Co-host (with Mano Agapion)
2019–present	Best Friends	Co-host (with Sasheer Zamata)
2020	Inside Voices	Guest
2020	Strong Black Lead	Guest
2020	Netflix Is a Daily Joke	Guest
2020	Staying In with Emily and Kumail	Guest
2020	Culture Kings	Guest
2020	U Up?	Guest
2020	I Don't Want to Talk About Fight Club Anymore	Guest; 2 episodes
2020	I Weigh with Jameela Jamil	Guest
2020	Spanish Aquí Presents	Guest
2020	Blank Check with Griffin & David	Guest
2020	Marti Talks	Guest
2020	Late Night with Seth Meyers Podcast	Guest
2020–present	Newcomers	Co-host (with Lauren Lapkus)
2021	Wanna Be on Top?	Guest
2021	My Favorite Murder	Guest
2022	Call Her Daddy	Guest
2025	Brooke Candy: Unwrapped	Guest

=== Web series ===
Year	Title	Role	Notes
2016	BUILD Series	Herself	Guest
2017	Comedians Review the Weirdest Beauty Products	Herself	Guest
2018	My Most Delish	Herself	Guest
2020	Transformations	Herself	Guest
2021	Harper's BAZAAR's Food Diaries: Bite Sized	Herself	Guest
2021–2022	The Pit Stop	Herself	Guest; 2 episodes
2022	I Spent a Day With...	Herself	Guest
2022	Nicole Byer On The Audition That Changed Her Perspective On Her Career	Herself	Entertainment Weekly's The Awardist
2022	The Plant-Based Way with Monét	Herself	Guest
2022	Reality TV Roundtable	Herself	The Hollywood Reporter

== Awards and nominations ==
Year	Association	Category	Work	Result	Ref.
2019	Gold Derby Awards	Best Reality Host	Nailed It!	Nominated	
2019	Gold Derby Awards	Reality Host of the Decade	Nailed It!	Nominated	
2019	Online Film & Television Association	Best Host in a Reality Program	Nailed It!	Nominated	
2020	Primetime Emmy Awards	Outstanding Host for a Reality or Competition Program	Nailed It!	Nominated	
2021	MTV Movie & TV Awards	Best Host	Nailed It!	Nominated	
2021	Primetime Emmy Awards	Outstanding Host for a Reality or Competition Program	Nailed It!	Nominated	
2022	Primetime Emmy Awards	Outstanding Host for a Reality or Competition Program	Nailed It!	Nominated	
2022	Primetime Emmy Awards	Outstanding Writing for a Variety Special	Nicole Byer: BBW (Big Beautiful Weirdo)	Nominated	
2023	Primetime Emmy Awards	Outstanding Host for a Reality or Competition Program	Nailed It!	Nominated	
