= Love (2016 TV series) =

American romantic comedy-drama streaming television series

- Genre: Romantic comedy Comedy-drama
- Created by: Judd Apatow; Lesley Arfin; Paul Rust
- Starring: Gillian Jacobs; Paul Rust; Claudia O'Doherty; Mike Mitchell; Chris Witaske
- Composer: Lyle Workman
- Country of origin: United States
- Original language: English
- No. of seasons: 3
- No. of episodes: 34

Production
- Executive producers: Judd Apatow; Paul Rust; Lesley Arfin; Brent Forrester; Dean Holland; Dave King; Ali Rushfield
- Camera setup: Single-camera
- Running time: 26–45 minutes
- Production companies: Apatow Productions; Don't Ask Arfin; Rust's Western Shed; Legendary Television

Original release
- Network: Netflix
- Release: February 19, 2016 – March 9, 2018

Love is an American romantic comedy-drama television series created by Judd Apatow, Lesley Arfin, and Paul Rust. The series stars Rust, Gillian Jacobs, Mike Mitchell, and Claudia O'Doherty. Netflix originally ordered two seasons of the show. The first 10-episode season was made available on February 19, 2016, and a 12-episode second season premiered on March 10, 2017. Netflix renewed the series for a third season one month prior to the second-season premiere. On December 15, 2017, Netflix announced that the third season would be its last. Season 3 premiered on March 9, 2018.

== Summary ==
The series is presented as a "down-to-earth look at dating", exploring male and female perspectives on romantic relationships through the characters Mickey and Gus, played by Jacobs and Rust. Mickey and Gus are two untrustworthy people, each with significant emotional baggage, attempting to build a trusting relationship with each other; Mickey is an alcoholic, a love/sex addict, a pot stirrer, and someone who tends to be dishonest with herself and others, while Gus is awkward, emotionally needy, oblivious to social cues, and prone to outbursts when things do not go his way.

== Episodes ==
Season	Episodes	Originally released
1	10	February 19, 2016
2	12	March 10, 2017
3	12	March 9, 2018

=== Season 1 (2016) ===
No. overall	No. in season	Title	Directed by	Written by	Original release date
1	1	"It Begins"	Dean Holland	Judd Apatow & Lesley Arfin & Paul Rust	February 19, 2016
Gus (Paul Rust), an on-set tutor, is in a long-term relationship with Natalie (Milana Vayntrub). Gus angrily breaks up with Natalie when she reveals that she cheated on him and says he is not nice, just "fake nice". Mickey (Gillian Jacobs), a program manager at a satellite radio station, is in an on-again, off-again relationship with a cocaine addict, Eric (Kyle Kinane). Gus becomes involved in a threesome and panics when he discovers that the girls are sisters. Mickey receives a call from Eric and decides to meet him at what she assumes will be a bar, only to discover that it is a spiritual meeting called Bliss House. The next morning, Gus meets Mickey at a store and offers to pay for her coffee because she forgot to bring her wallet.
2	2	"One Long Day"	Dean Holland	Lesley Arfin & Paul Rust & Brent Forrester	February 26, 2016
Mickey offers to pay back Gus for her coffee and cigarettes. Mickey's new roommate Bertie (Claudia O'Doherty) moves in with her. Mickey realizes that she dropped her wallet at Bliss House and offers to drive Gus back home. They have breakfast together and smoke weed. While intoxicated, Gus mistakenly mentions Natalie's address as his address, and confrontation ensues when they reach Natalie's place. Having collected his boxes from her place, Gus throws out all of his Blu-rays on the way back home.
3	3	"Tested"	John Slattery	Judd Apatow & Paul Rust	March 4, 2016
Gus struggles with his tutee, Arya (Iris Apatow), a child actress under a lot of pressure. Faced with losing his job if she fails her test, he ends up cheating and doing it for her. Meanwhile, when Mickey's boss Dr. Greg (Brett Gelman) flirts with her, she decides she has to sleep with him out of fear of getting fired. However, she soon realizes she misjudged Dr. Greg.
4	4	"Party in the Hills"	John Slattery	Alexandra Rushfield	March 11, 2016
Gus is thrilled when Mickey invites him to a party, hoping to make a move on her. However, she is extremely late, and quickly blows him off when she discovers that two of her ex-boyfriends are present. While Gus makes friends elsewhere, Mickey struggles when faced with her past mistakes, and proceeds to make some bad drunk decisions. Gus quickly comes running to her rescue, but instead of seeing him as her hero, Mickey suggests that he should date Bertie.
5	5	"The Date"	Maggie Carey	Judd Apatow & Paul Rust	March 18, 2016
Gus ends up on a date with Bertie and it does not go well. It is stilted and awkward until too much information is inadvertently shared. Gus stands up for himself with unexpected results. Mickey copes with starting over with her sobriety.
6	6	"Andy"	Joe Swanberg	Dave King	March 25, 2016
Mickey and Gus are planning a late-night date, and Gus is walking on a cloud. Mickey starts to have second thoughts because of her horrible past experiences. Dr. Greg is concerned about the quality of callers into the show. He wants better calls so he convinces Mickey to pose as a caller. She starts a call and ends up putting her personal life into her assumed identity. Dr. Greg realizes what is going on and advises her to cut and run because she is incapable of having real relationships due to her addiction problems. After a very long night filled with miscommunication—and an odd meet-up with Andy Dick—Mickey and Gus agree to have a real date.
7	7	"Magic"	Steve Buscemi	Lesley Arfin	April 1, 2016
Gus sets out to dazzle Mickey on their first real date, but the night does not go quite as planned.
8	8	"Closing Title Song"	Michael Showalter	Ali Waller	April 8, 2016
As Mickey frets about the fallout from their date, a new female guest shakes things up at Gus's film night jam session.
9	9	"The Table Read"	Dean Holland	Brent Forrester	April 15, 2016
Gus gets an exciting opportunity at work, but a surprise visit from Mickey sends the day spiraling in a different direction.
10	10	"The End of the Beginning"	Dean Holland	Judd Apatow & Lesley Arfin & Paul Rust	April 22, 2016
Troubles keep mounting for Gus as he gets to experience life in the writers' room. Meanwhile, a new crisis pushes Mickey to a breaking point.

=== Season 2 (2017) ===
No. overall	No. in season	Title	Directed by	Written by	Original release date
11	1	"On Lockdown"	Dean Holland	Judd Apatow & Lesley Arfin & Paul Rust	March 10, 2017
After coming clean to Gus, Mickey tries to head home to decompress. But an unexpected turn of events keeps them out together late into the night when Gus and Mickey are locked in his apartment. Mickey wants to leave Gus' apartment, but due to the lockdown she is not able to leave. Gus and Mickey attempt to leave to grab an Uber, but they get chased and caught by the police. Mickey spends the night at Gus' apartment.
12	2	"Friends Night Out"	Dean Holland	Brent Forrester & Alexandra Rushfield	March 10, 2017
While Gus heads to a bar with his guy friends, a restless Mickey stirs up trouble at a dinner party full of couples. Gus goes to a bar and sees Michael Landon from Little House on the Prairie on the TV, who has similar hair to Gus.
13	3	"While You Were Sleeping"	Maggie Carey	Dave King	March 10, 2017
Mickey tries to help her work buddy Truman out of a sticky situation, an on-set accident rattles the Witchita cast and crew. Heidi (Briga Heelan) is back. Gus' boss is high and has him give her a ride home. At the end, Susan Cheryl asks Gus to sleep with her and he says no.
14	4	"Shrooms"	Maggie Carey	Dave King & Paul Rust	March 10, 2017
A quiet night turns trippy when Mickey convinces Gus, Bertie and Randy to sample her leftover psychedelic mushrooms. Randy sees a coyote and starts chasing it. He heads into someone's home and lies on their bed. Gus convinces him to leave. Later, as Randy is falling asleep in Bertie's bed, he says he could kill people.
15	5	"A Day"	Lynn Shelton	Mason Flink	March 10, 2017
On a day of spontaneous adventures, Mickey and Gus open up about their pasts and begin to let go of their fears.
16	6	"Forced Hiatus"	John Slattery	Rebecca Addelman	March 10, 2017
Big news on the Witchita set leaves Gus caught in the middle of a family dispute over Arya's future. Mickey grows suspicious of Randy's motives. Randy and Mickey spend the day in the mall. Randy borrows $850 from Bertie for rent.
17	7	"The Work Party"	Brent Forrester	Brent Forrester & Alexandra Rushfield	March 10, 2017
While Mickey schmoozes with her new corporate bosses at a radio station party, Gus strikes up an unlikely friendship with Dr. Greg.
18	8	"Marty Dobbs"	Lynn Shelton	Rebecca Addelman & Ali Waller	March 10, 2017
Gus joins Mickey for an outing with her dad but soon realizes the father–daughter dynamic is more dysfunctional than she let on.
19	9	"Housesitting"	Dean Holland	Judd Apatow & Paul Rust	March 10, 2017
While housesitting at a friend's mansion, Gus and Mickey host a Witchita viewing party. However, brewing tensions threaten to spoil the fun.
20	10	"Liberty Down"	Dean Holland	Dave King & Ali Waller	March 10, 2017
As Gus heads off to the set of Arya's action film and Mickey dives into a project at work, new cracks appear in their relationship.
21	11	"The Long D"	Joe Swanberg	Brent Forrester & Ali Rushfield	March 10, 2017
Mickey bonds with her ex, while Gus makes a desperate bid to patch things up with the film director. Bertie has a revelation.
22	12	"Back in Town"	Joe Swanberg	Judd Apatow & Paul Rust	March 10, 2017
With Gus back home, Mickey realizes she needs to make a decision. But her attempt to straighten out her love life only creates more chaos.

=== Season 3 (2018) ===
No. overall	No. in season	Title	Directed by	Written by	Original release date
23	1	"Palm Springs Getaway"	Michael Showalter	Judd Apatow & Dave King & Paul Rust	March 9, 2018
Randy pressures Mickey, Gus and Bertie into a couples weekend at his cousin's sweet Palm Springs pad. But nothing about the house is as advertised.
24	2	"Winners and Losers"	Michael Showalter	Judd Apatow & Paul Rust	March 9, 2018
While Mickey rides a wave of good news at work, Gus tries to spread some cheer around the tense Witchita set—with demoralizing results.
25	3	"Arya and Greg"	Judd Apatow	Judd Apatow & Brent Forrester & Rebecca Addelman	March 9, 2018
Gus helps a stressed-out Arya gear up for a big scene, while Mickey tries to salvage Dr. Greg's disastrous book-signing event.
26	4	"I'm Sick"	Alex Karpovsky	Max Brockman & Jason Kim	March 9, 2018
Gus realizes he's facing a major relationship test when Mickey falls sick just as he's heading out on a horror movie location tour with friends.
27	5	"Bertie's Birthday"	Janicza Bravo	Alexandra Rushfield & Ali Waller	March 9, 2018
Bertie wakes up with a call from her family in Australia wishing her a happy birthday. Bertie had not mentioned her upcoming birthday, so she becomes disappointed with neither Mickey or Randy are available to celebrate with her. She connects with Chris, who tells her that the Smoke House where he works will give her a free cake for her birthday. After she finishes her cake and Chris finishes his shift, Chris takes Bertie to a local amateur wrestling show. Chris admits that he has always wanted to get in the ring, but was too scared to ever do so. With a bit of nudging from Bertie, he gets in the ring with Keith the Cremator (Tyrus) and loses, but becomes invigorated by the experience. Bertie confesses the reason she came to the US, that one day she suddenly left her long-time boyfriend and her job in a flower store to move to America. Chris tells Bertie that he came to LA to be a stuntman, and his lease at the Springwood is nearly up. Bertie convinces him to make the most of his time here.
28	6	"Directing"	Ryan McFaul	Max Brockman & Alexandra Rushfield	March 9, 2018
Gus collects his friends to create a movie based on his script. The filming runs into a number of problems that upset the group, and Gus becomes afraid that it will completely fall apart. With some encouragement from Mickey, he begs his friends to stay late and finish the film, and Gus is uplifted by how it has turned out. Meanwhile, Mickey reconnects with her friend Shaun, who claims that her husband Brian will not let Mickey come over anymore because of the drama that seems to follow her. Mickey invites Shaun and Brian over for dinner, and Randy volunteers to make a brisket. As Randy fumbles to finish making dinner, Mickey and Shaun clash; Shaun believes that Mickey truly hasn't changed since trying to become sober, and Mickey finds out that Shaun is the one who banned Mickey from coming over. When they leave, Bertie, Randy, and Mickey sit down to dinner where they encourage Randy to pursue a culinary career.
29	7	"Sarah from College"	Michael Lewen	Judd Apatow & Paul Rust	March 9, 2018
Gus and Mickey attend a wedding of one of Gus's college friends. While there, Gus reconnects with an ex, Sarah. While Gus seems uncomfortable to spend time with Sarah, Mickey insists that they socialize with her during the cocktail hour. It is revealed at dinner that Gus was once engaged to Sarah after an elaborate proposal, and Mickey takes offense that Gus downplayed his history with Sarah by keeping his relationship a secret. Sarah becomes steadily more drunk and embarrasses herself trying to sing a song with the band. When Gus tells Mickey that he volunteered to take Sarah back to her hotel, Mickey accuses him of still having feelings for Sarah, but Gus escorts her home anyway. At the hotel, Sarah tells Gus the story of her recent divorce and that the bright side of this wedding reunion is that "at least one of us is happy." Gus drives home on his own.
30	8	"Stunt Show"	Ryan McFaul	Dave King & Ali Waller	March 9, 2018
Bertie discovers Randy has been sleeping in his car in order to save money. Randy lands a job as an extra on the set of Witchita. Gus continues to work on his script and asks Arya if she would be part of his movie. Arya agrees reluctantly, claiming that this will be the one favor that Gus can ever cash in with her. When filming goes less than perfect, Gus loses his cool on set. Chris attends a stunts course, and the instructor tells Chris that she can try to secure for him an audition at the Waterworld stunt show at Universal Studios. Chris texts Bertie about the audition and invites her out to explain the plot of Waterworld. Bertie and Chris have sex in his apartment. The next day, Chris enthusiastically joins the Waterworld stunt crew. Dr. Greg asks Mickey if he can appear on Stella's show at the radio station. Mickey calls in the favor with Stella, but Stella is not excited about the prospect. During the show, Greg has a meltdown and the station suspends him for sexual harassment.
31	9	"You're My Gran Torino"	Lynn Shelton	Max Brockman & Ali Waller	March 9, 2018
Mickey is disappointed that Gus did not initially invite her along to South Dakota to meet his family, so Gus asks her to join. Gus' movie title band has their first live gig and Gus apologizes to his friends for his on-set freakout. Bertie tells Mickey about her affair with Chris. Mickey decides she wants to go to South Dakota.
32	10	"The Cruikshanks"	Nisha Ganatra	Brent Forrester & Paul Rust	March 9, 2018
Gus faces pushback from Arya's father, Steven, about putting her in his film. Gus and Mickey go to South Dakota and she meets Gus' mother (Kathy Baker) and father (Ed Begley Jr.). Mickey hits it off with Gus' family, prompting Gus's jealousy. Gus and Mickey fight when he tells her that he is hesitant to have children with her because of her struggles with sobriety. In LA, Bertie asks Chris to help with a blocked drain. Chris tells Bertie that they should not be hooking up while she and Randy are still together, but Bertie cannot bring herself to do it.
33	11	"Anniversary Party"	Nisha Ganatra	Alexandra Rushfield & Paul Rust	March 9, 2018
Mickey is still hurt by Gus calling her unstable, but Gus convinces her to stay through his parents' anniversary party. Gus' siblings tell Mickey about Gus' professional embarrassment from when he worked as Ridley Scott's assistant. Mickey confronts Gus about his propensity to hide secrets and decides to head home. Gus confesses to Mickey and his family his secrets and embarrassments, which gets no reaction from his family, but helps him reconcile with Mickey. Mickey asks Gus to describe their future together.
34	12	"Catalina"	Lynn Shelton	Judd Apatow & Dave King & Paul Rust	March 9, 2018
Bertie breaks up with Randy and he does not take it well. Gus' boss hires Gus as a writer for a new sci-fi show. Gus and Mickey decide to elope and take Bertie and Chris with them, inviting the rest of their friends via mass text. While the group has fun on Catalina Island, Gus and Mickey's friends implant doubt in the couple's heads. The ceremony is interrupted when a nearby beachgoer suffers a heart attack. Gus and Mickey tell the group that they have decided not to immediately get married, but while the group is partying in the evening, they sneak out and complete the ceremony on their own.

== Cast ==
=== Main ===
- Gillian Jacobs as Mickey Dobbs
- Paul Rust as Gus Cruikshank
- Claudia O'Doherty as Bertie Bauer
- Chris Witaske as Chris Czajkowski (season 3, recurring seasons 1–2)
- Mike Mitchell as Randy Monahan

=== Recurring ===
Gus's and Mickey's family

- Kathy Baker as Vicki Cruikshank
- Ed Begley Jr. as Mark Cruikshank
- Kyle Bornheimer as Ken Cruikshank
- Drew Tarver as Andrew Cruikshank
- Daniel Stern as Marty Dobbs

Gus's coworkers

- Iris Apatow as Arya Hopkins
- Tracie Thoms as Susan Cheryl
- Jordan Rock as Kevin
- Milana Vayntrub as Natalie
- Seth Morris as Evan
- Dawn Forrester as Denise Hopkins, Arya's mother

Mickey's coworkers

- Brett Gelman as Greg Colter ("Dr. Greg")
- Bobby Lee as Truman

Mickey's friends

- Kerri Kenney as Syd
- Kyle Kinane as Eric
- Chantal Claret as Shaun
- Andy Dick as himself

Other recurring characters

- John Ross Bowie as Rob
- Steve Bannos as Frank
- Dave Gruber Allen as Allan
- David Spade as Steven Hopkins
- Eddie Pepitone as Eddie
- Saxon Sharbino as Simone
- Dawn Forrester as Denise Hopkins
- Mark Oliver Everett as Brian
- Rich Sommer as Dustin
- Kirby Howell-Baptiste as Beth
- Esther Povitsky as Alexis
- Michael Cassady as Dean
- Lisa Darr as Diane
- Briga Heelan as Heidi McAuliffe
- Jason Dill as Len
- Alexandra Rushfield as Ali Rush
- Dave King as Wyatt Meyers
- Jake Elliott as Aidan
- Cristin McAlister as Britney
- Mike Hanford as Wade
- Neil Campbell as Kyle
- Armen Weitzman as Ruby
- Tim Kalpakis as Walt
- Kulap Vilaysack as Rebecca
- Jay Johnston as Pastor
- Liz Femi as Liz
- Horatio Sanz as Jeff
- Chris Redd as Justin
- Paula Pell as Erika
- Jongman Kim as Victor
- Randall Park as Tommy

=== Guest ===
- Carlos Acuña as Carlos
- Stephanie Allynne as Kelly
- Mädchen Amick as Mom
- Vanessa Bayer as Sarah, Gus's ex fiancée
- Stephen Boss as Doobie
- Jesse Bradford as Carl
- Janicza Bravo as Lorna
- Danny Cole as William the Wonder
- John Early as Daniel
- Eric Edelstein as Devon Monahan
- Chase Ellison as Jacob
- Jessie Ennis as Stella
- John Ennis as Don
- Megan Ferguson as Natasha
- Rich Fulcher as Glen Michener
- Leslie Grossman as Liz
- Sandrine Holt as Jorie
- Hannah Leder as Lila
- Liz Lee as SLAA Member
- Joe Mande as Jeffrey
- Aparna Nancherla as Lauren
- Tipper Newton as Kali
- Graham Rogers as Mike
- Will Sasso as Ben
- Rory Scovel as Gator
- Jason Stuart as Dr. Powell
- Robin Tunney as Waverly
- Tyrus as Keith the Cremator
- Justin Willman as a magician
- Nancy Youngblut as Carol
- Charlyne Yi as Cori
- Catherine Waller as Emma

== Reception ==
=== Critical ===
Love has received positive reviews from critics, with particular praise for the cast. On the review aggregator Rotten Tomatoes, season one holds an approval rating of 88% based on 40 reviews, with an average rating of 7.2/10. The website's critical consensus reads, "Judd Apatow's Love is an honest look at building a relationship, helped along by its two appealing leads." On Metacritic the season has an average score of 72 out of 100, based on 27 critics, indicating "generally favorable reviews".

The Hollywood Reporter and Variety reviewed the show favorably but said the episodes' length (up to 40 minutes) and the familiar premise do not always work in the show's favor. Daniel Fienberg of The Hollywood Reporter wrote, "It's a variation on a common theme, but it's also squirmingly effective, fitfully funny and carried by a great, uncompromising performance from Gillian Jacobs...If you can warm up to the prickly, but probably realistic, characters, there's a lot to like, if not love." Alan Sepinwall of Hitfix wrote, "When you feel it—as I very quickly did with Love—nothing else matters."

On Rotten Tomatoes, the second season has an approval rating of 94% based on 17 reviews, with an average rating of 7.19/10. The website's critical consensus reads, "In its sophomore season, Love treads the balance between comedy and drama with greater confidence, going deeper into the endearing, frustrating, delightfully realistic relationship of Mickey and Gus." On Metacritic, the season has an average score of 80 out of 100, based on 6 critics, indicating "generally favorable reviews".

The third season was also well-received, with 100% on Rotten Tomatoes (based on 11 reviews), and a consensus that "Love concludes with a moving final season that explores the work that goes into making a relationship succeed, allowing its central pair to surprise the audience, each other, and ultimately themselves." This season scored 77 out of 100 on Metacritic, indicating "generally favorable reviews". For The A.V. Club, Erik Adams wrote, "More than the love story itself, Love's greatest achievement might be that it managed to make Gus and Mickey feel like fully realized, complicated individuals independent of their love story."

=== Accolades ===
In 2017, Love was nominated for Best Musical or Comedy Series at the 21st Satellite Awards.
