= The Napa Boys =

- Theatrical release poster
- Directed by: Nick Corirossi
- Written by: Nick Corirossi; Armen Weitzman
- Produced by: Mike Rosenstein; Erin Owens; Armen Weitzman
- Starring: Armen Weitzman; Nick Corirossi; Sarah Ramos; Jamar Neighbors; Mike Mitchell; Nelson Franklin
- Cinematography: Markus Mentzer
- Edited by: Caleb Swyers
- Production company: Sunset Rose Pictures
- Distributed by: Magnolia Pictures
- Release dates: September 12, 2025 (TIFF); February 27, 2026 (United States)
- Running time: 92 minutes
- Country: United States
- Language: English
- Box office: $45,690

The Napa Boys is a 2025 American comedy film directed by Nick Corirossi and co-written by Corirossi and Armen Weitzman, who also star. The film premiered in the Midnight Madness section of the 2025 Toronto International Film Festival. Magnolia Pictures later acquired U.S. distribution rights.

== Plot ==
Presented as The Napa Boys 4: The Sommelier's Amulet, the film follows a trio of wine-obsessed characters who go on an adventure through California's wine country. They start with a high-stakes wine competition, and a series of escalating absurd set-pieces.

== Cast ==
- Armen Weitzman as Miles Jr.
- Nick Corirossi as Jack Jr.
- Sarah Ramos as Puck
- Jamar Malachi Neighbors as Stiffler's Brother
- Mike Mitchell as Mitch Mitchellson
- Nelson Franklin as Kevin
- Chloe Cherry as Kim
- Vanessa Lee Chester as Loretta
- Paul Rust as Squirm
- David Wain as Wilbur Winejudge
- Beth Dover as Trixie
- Jason Mewes and Kevin Smith as Jay and Silent Bob
- DJ Qualls as The Sommelier
- Ivy Wolk as Prancer
- Chris Aquilino as John
- Natasha Behnam as Skyler
- Ray Wise as Officer Toland
- Mike Hanford as Officer Roland
- Ryan Perez as The Mayor of Napa
- Natasha Leggero as Annie
- Riki Lindhome as Monica
- Steve Agee as Ethan Nerdone
- Jack Allison as Sam Fantwo
- Harley Quinn Smith as Harper
- Nik Dodani as Gracer

== Production ==
Corirossi and Weitzman developed the film as a franchise spoof similar to Sideways with the gross-out sensibility of early-2000s ensemble comedies like American Pie or Wet Hot American Summer. The filmmakers framed the movie as the "fourth entry" in a fictional franchise, complete with in-universe mythology and recurring characters.

== Release ==
The film premiered on September 12, 2025, in the Toronto International Film Festival's Midnight Madness program. Following early festival screenings, Magnolia Pictures acquired U.S. distribution rights, It was released on February 27, 2026.

== Reception ==
On the review aggregator website Rotten Tomatoes, 57% of 21 critics' reviews are positive, with critics divided between praising the film's boldness and criticizing its deliberately disorienting tone.

RogerEbert.com described the film as potentially challenging to viewers, as it throws them into the "deep end of a franchise that never existed until this installment." Variety highlighted the film's blend of wine-country parody and absurdist raunch comedy, calling it a fusion of Sideways and American Pie. The San Francisco Chronicle reported that some of the film's more extreme early gross-out sequences prompted walk-outs during its TIFF screening. Other critics noted the intentionally nonsensical narrative structure and the film's barrage of inside-joke-driven humour.
