= Tim Kalpakis =

American director, comedian, and musician

- Born: Timothy Kalpakis; May 1, 1983 (age 43); Upstate New York
- Education: Ithaca College
- Occupations: Comedian; writer; actor; musician; podcaster
- Years active: 2006–present

Timothy Kalpakis (born May 1, 1983) is a Los Angeles comedian, writer, actor, podcaster, and musician. He started his career in screenwriting before forming The Birthday Boys sketch group with fellow Ithaca College graduates in Hollywood, Los Angeles.

In 2013, Kalpakis started his band, The Sloppy Boys, with fellow Birthday Boys Mike Hanford and Jefferson Dutton. In 2020, the trio started a podcast by the same name.

A self-identified boulevardier, Kalpakis is a frequenter of Los Feliz, Los Angeles bars.

== Early life ==
Kalpakis was born in Upstate New York to Greek parents from Montreal, Quebec.

He studied film at Ithaca College in Ithaca, New York.

== Early career ==
Kalpakis began his career in Hollywood, Los Angeles. In 2006, he started performing as a student at the Upright Citizens Brigade Theatre in Los Angeles. In 2007, he started a sketch comedy group there, The Birthday Boys, with friends he met at Ithaca College. They quickly came to prominence on the Internet, also making sketch comedy videos for Funny or Die.

In 2010, Kalpakis took on a role as a writing teacher at UCB LA, where he met Scott Aukerman, who offered him a guest spot on his podcast, Comedy Bang! Bang!. When it was adapted into a TV series in 2012, Aukerman offered Kalpakis a writing job and multiple onscreen appearances.

The same year, The Birthday Boys were discovered at UCB by Bob Odenkirk, who took it upon himself to produce their self-titled TV show on IFC. The show premiered on October 18, 2013. It has since been recognized as a cult classic.

== Writing ==
=== Television ===
Year	Title	Ref.
2023-2025	Digman!	
2016-2017	I Love You, America with Sarah Silverman	
2017-2018	Saturday Night Live	
2017	Michael Bolton's Big, Sexy Valentine's Day Special	
2016	The UCB Show	
2012-2016	Comedy Bang! Bang!	
2013-2014	The Birthday Boys	
2012	Between Two Ferns with Zach Galifianakis	

=== Awards shows ===
Year	Title	Ref.
2024	76th Primetime Emmy Awards	
2018	2018 MTV Movie & TV Awards	
2018	33rd Independent Spirit Awards	
2017	32nd Independent Spirit Awards	
2015	67th Primetime Emmy Awards	
2010	2010 MTV Movie Awards	
2009	2009 MTV Movie Awards	

== Acting ==
Year	Title	Role	Type	Ref.
2026	High on Life 2	Additional Voices	Video Game	
2019	Brooklyn Nine-Nine	Micah Simmons	TV Series	
2016-2017	Love	Walt	TV Series	
2017	Michael Bolton's Big, Sexy Valentine's Day Special	Jack Sparrow Orchestra	TV Special	
2012-2016	Comedy Bang! Bang!	Lloyd Fleen/Rat/Charlie Shanderville/Pizza Chef/Blake/Phone/Tim Kalpakis/Shepherd/Writer/Italian/Various	TV Series	
2016	Bajillion Dollar Propertie$	Kalpy	TV Series	
2016	The UCB Show		TV Series	
2015	W/ Bob & David	Virgin		
2013-2014	The Birthday Boys	Various	TV Series	

== Music ==
=== The Sloppy Boys (band) ===
In 2013, Kalpakis started a Weezer cover band, The Sloppy Boys Jangly Band with fellow members of the Birthday Boys Jefferson Dutton and Mike Hanford in Los Feliz, Los Angeles. The group's name was later shortened to The Sloppy Boys. The band started writing original music in 2018.

During the COVID-19 lockdowns in 2020, the band started doing weekly "Zoom Rooms" to promote their third album, Paradiso, and connected with fans worldwide.

The Sloppy Boys were the subject of the 2023 documentary film Blood, Sweat and Beers, or How the Sloppy Boys Made an Album on a Farm in West Texas. It followed their five days of production with Money Mark of Beastie Boys fame, and won the Audience Award at the 2024 El Paso Film Festival in El Paso, Texas.

=== The Sloppy Boys (podcast) ===
Riding the momentum of their Zoom rooms, The Sloppy Boys started a self-titled weekly cocktail podcast on October 22, 2020. Their goal was to drink their way through the International Bartenders Association's official cocktail list. They launched their Patreon bonus show, The Sloppy Boys Blowout the same week.

=== Discography ===
Release Date	Title	Ref.
July 29, 2024	Sonic Ranch	
July 31, 2020	Paradiso	
September 6, 2019	Dancing on the Wind	
June 19, 2018	Lifelong Vacation	
