= Mike Hanford =

American actor, comedian, and musician

- Born: Michael Hanford; November 3, 1983 (age 42); New York, United States
- Education: Ithaca College
- Occupations: Actor; comedian; musician
- Years active: 2009–present
- Agent: Dynamic Talent

Michael Hanford (born November 3, 1983) is a New York City comedian, actor, screenwriter, producer, podcaster, and musician. He started in sketch and improvisational comedy before forming The Birthday Boys sketch group with fellow Ithaca College graduates in Hollywood, Los Angeles.

In 2013, Hanford started his band, The Sloppy Boys, with fellow Birthday Boys Jefferson Dutton and Tim Kalpakis. In 2020, the trio started a podcast by the same name.

== Early life ==
Hanford was born in Upstate New York and grew up playing hockey.

He studied film at Ithaca College in Ithaca, New York. He spent a year abroad from Ithaca at the University of Toronto in Toronto, Ontario.

== Career ==
=== Early career (sketch comedy) ===
Hanford began his career in Hollywood, Los Angeles. In 2007, he started a sketch comedy group, The Birthday Boys with friends he met at Ithaca College. They quickly came to prominence on the Internet. His first appearance on the Comedy Bang! Bang! podcast was in 2010. He gained further notoriety making sketch comedy videos for Funny or Die.

The Birthday Boys were discovered at Upright Citizens Brigade by Bob Odenkirk, who took particular interest in Hanford and Kalpakis, recruiting them for his comedy group "Gentleman's Club". Odenkirk took it upon himself to produce The Birthday Boys' self-titled TV show on IFC. The show premiered on October 18, 2013.

=== John Lennon ===
Hanford gained notoriety early in his career by playing the role of the ghost of John Lennon on the improv podcast Comedy Bang! Bang! Hanford appeared in costume as Lennon when accompanying them on their live podcast tours. When it was adapted into a TV show, he also appeared dressed as Lennon on Comedy Bang! Bang! The TV Show.

He spun the character off in 2019 for Earwolf, creating Questions for Lennon, an advice podcast. In 2020, Questions for Lennon moved to The Sloppy Boys' Patreon.

=== Other podcasts ===
Hanford also made his name from guest spots on other podcasts, appearing on audience-favourite episodes of Doughboys, Analyze Phish, Hollywood Handbook, With Special Guest Lauren Lapkus, Hello from the Magic Tavern, Spontaneanation, and Podcast: The Ride.

=== The Sloppy Boys (band) ===
In 2013, Hanford started a Weezer cover band, The Sloppy Boys Jangly Band with fellow members of the Birthday Boys Tim Kalpakis and Jefferson Dutton. The group's name was later shortened to The Sloppy Boys. The band started writing original music in 2018.

During the COVID-19 lockdowns in 2020, the band started doing weekly "Zoom Rooms" to promote their new album, Paradiso, and connected with fans worldwide.

Directed by KFOX-TV journalist Robert Holguin, The Sloppy Boys were the subject of the 2023 documentary film Blood, Sweat and Beers, or How the Sloppy Boys Made an Album on a Farm in West Texas. It won the Audience Award at the 2024 El Paso Film Festival in El Paso, Texas.

=== The Sloppy Boys (podcast) ===
Riding the momentum of their Zoom rooms, The Sloppy Boys started a self-titled weekly cocktail podcast on October 22, 2020. Their goal was to drink their way through the International Bartenders Association's official cocktail list. They launched their Patreon bonus show, The Sloppy Boys Blowout the same week.

=== Stand-up comedy ===
Hanford has performed stand-up comedy at festivals such as SF Sketchfest 2025.

He taped his debut stand-up special on February 28, 2026 at Comedy Bar Bloor in Toronto.

== Writing ==
Year	Title	Notes	Ref.
2013-2014	The Birthday Boys		
2015	The 67th Emmy Awards		
2013-2016	Comedy Bang! Bang!		
2016-2017	The UCB Show		
2019	Bajillion Dollar Propertie$		
2019	Alternatino with Arturo Castro		
2023	The Tonight Show Starring Jimmy Fallon		

== Acting ==
=== Film ===
Year	Title	Role	Ref.
2013	Monsters University	Additional Voices	
2025	The Napa Boys	Officer Roland	

=== Television ===
Year	Title	Role	Ref.
2023-2025	Digman!	Billy Themet	
2023	The Tonight Show Starring Jimmy Fallon	Himself	
2019	Alternatino with Arturo Castro		
2016-2018	Love	Wade	
2017	Michael Bolton's Big, Sexy Valentine's Day Special	Jack Sparrow Orchestra	
2016-2017	The UCB Show		
2012-2016	Comedy Bang! Bang!	Mike the Boom Operator/Movie Cop/Tom Perdy/Hockey Expert/John Lennon	
2016	Bajillion Dollar Propertie$	Hanny	
2015	W/ Bob & David	Virgin/Co-worker	
2013-2014	The Birthday Boys	Various	
2012	Portlandia	Dave Cress	
2012	Parks and Recreation	Brad	
