= Bajillion Dollar Propertie$ =

Television series

- Season 2 intertitle
- Created by: Kulap Vilaysack
- Starring: Dan Ahdoot; Tim Baltz; Ryan Gaul; Mandell Maughan; Tawny Newsome; Drew Tarver; Paul F. Tompkins; Eugene Cordero
- Composer: Jason Moss
- Country of origin: United States
- Original language: English
- No. of seasons: 4
- No. of episodes: 34

Production
- Executive producers: Kulap Vilaysack; Scott Aukerman; Thomas Lennon; Robert Ben Garant; David Jargowsky
- Camera setup: Single-camera
- Running time: 30 minutes
- Production companies: Garant/Lennon Productions; Comedy Bang! Bang! Productions; Paramount Television

Original release
- Network: Seeso / Pluto TV
- Release: February 20, 2016 – August 8, 2019

Bajillion Dollar Propertie$ is an American comedy series on the Seeso comedy subscription streaming service. The series, created by Kulap Vilaysack, is a semi-scripted parody of the reality television franchise Million Dollar Listing. Bajillion Dollar Propertie$ previewed its pilot episode on February 20, 2016 and officially premiered on March 17, 2016, and the series' second season premiered in the fall of 2016. On December 12, 2016, Seeso renewed the series for a third and fourth season. On August 9, 2017, Seeso announced the shutdown of its service by the end of the year, leaving Bajillion Dollar Propertie$ without a home. On July 15, 2019, it was reported that the previously unaired fourth season would air on Pluto TV. As of 2023 the series is no longer available on Pluto.TV.

== Cast and characters ==
- Dan Ahdoot as Amir Yaghoob
- Tim Baltz as Glenn Bouchard
- Ryan Gaul as Andrew Wright
- Mandell Maughan as Victoria King
- Tawny Newsome as Chelsea Leight-Leigh
- Drew Tarver as Baxter Reynolds
- Paul F. Tompkins as Dean Rosedragon
- Eugene Cordero as DJ Rosedragon (season 4; recurring season 3)

== Episodes ==
=== Season 1 (2016) ===
No. overall	No. in season	Title	Directed by	Written by	Original release date
1	1	"Meet Platinum"	Robert Ben Garant	Kulap Vilaysack	February 20, 2016
Dean Rosedragon announces a contest to become his partner at Platinum Reality. Glenn, the new office manager, tries to assert himself. Andrew and Baxter are tasked with selling the home of an action movie star with a drug and alcohol problem. Victoria steals one of Chelsea's clients. Amir gets a better understanding of Glenn's abrupt arrival. Guest Starring Adam Scott as Johnny Dunne Co-Starring Suzi Barrett as Server Angela, DeMorge Brown as Bill, Dhruv Uday Singh as Londale
2	2	"Uncle Jerry"	Robert Ben Garant	Brad Morris	March 17, 2016
Dean hires a sleazy photographer to shoot the brokers' promo photos. Andrew and Baxter show a home to a former college friend. Amir arrives at an open house to find a squatter. Guest Starring Jason Mantzoukas as Uncle Jerry, Betsy Sodaro as Loretta Co-Starring Jeff B. Davis as Dirk St. Hancock, Jerry Minor as Brentyl, Kulap Vilaysack as Cassandra
3	3	"Inside Joke"	Alex Fernie	Alex Fernie	March 24, 2016
Former foes Victoria and Baxter bond over an inside joke at Chelsea's expense. Their sudden friendship drives Andrew crazy with jealousy. Meanwhile Amir's mysterious new client shows up guns blazing... literally, and Chelsea has to sell a house to a heartbroken man. Guest Starring Horatio Sanz as Dr. Horowitz, Andy Richter as Art Gordon Co-Starring Joe Nunez as Jota, Cedric Yarbrough as Trent Adler, Kulap Vilaysack as Voice of Debbie
4	4	"Amir Is Glenn's Mentor"	Alex Fernie	Shauna McGarry	March 31, 2016
Amir takes Glenn under his wing to teach him about the real estate business and the results are mentally, physically and financially grueling. The Bros are forced to woo an ancient and not quite coherent seller, while Victoria and Chelsea spend the afternoon with a creepy, sex-obsessed client. Guest Starring Kerri Kenney-Silver as Mrs. Gullier, Seth Morris as Shoshua Co-Starring Brian Huskey as Major Domo Gustav, David Jargowsky as Homeowner, Ingrid Haas as Mentor Client
5	5	"Brtox"	Robert Ben Garant	Kevin Seccia	April 7, 2016
Amir, Victoria and Baxter endure humiliation after their monthly beauty regimen goes awry, thanks to Glenn. Andrew has to find a home for an intense actor who insists on staying in character the entire time and Chelsea explores a spooky basement in order to get a house to pass inspection. Guest Starring Scott Aukerman as Tobin, Rich Fulcher as Dr. Chambong, Chris Tallman as Hector Co-Starring John Ennis as Cable Guy, Amy Rhodes as Susan
6	6	"Roger Me Rightly"	Robert Ben Garant	Jessica Gao	April 14, 2016
Platinum receives a visit from Dean's hard-drinking, salesman friend from the old days. His roughhouse tactics clash with the brokers' style. Amir tries to sell a house to a pair of famous lesbians but Glenn's fandom gets in the way, and we meet Platinum's rival firm. Guest Starring Robert Ben Garant as Gio, Thomas Lennon as Serge, Cameron Esposito as Liz, David Koechner as Roger Ramsey, River Butcher as Jamie Co-Starring Mary Jo Catlett as Ethel Simmons
7	7	"Happy Ending"	Alex Fernie	Kate Berlant	April 21, 2016
The brokers all get massages but receive far from equal treatment, which causes Glenn to take matters into his own hands. Meanwhile, Chelsea tries to sell a mansion to a popular televangelist who's bringing very specific orders from the lord. Guest Starring Paul Scheer as Reverend Coyne, Craig Cackowski as Todd the Janitor, Neil Campbell as Zach the Masseuse Co-Starring Londale Theus, Jr. as Brother Gayle
8	8	"Make Partner Part 1"	Alex Fernie	Kulap Vilaysack	April 28, 2016
After a frantic race for sales the brokers finally will learn which of them makes partner. The bros deal with a home-intruder-obsessed buyer while Amir tries to sell to a couple looking to cook a very specific recipe. Victoria works with a group of millionaire lottery winners and Chelsea meets Serge & Gio. Guest Starring Matt Besser as Rick, Danielle Schneider as Jennifer, Jefferson Dutton as Dutts, David Ferguson as Deef
9	9	"Make Partner Part 2"	Alex Fernie	Brad Morris	April 28, 2016
With more time added to the clock, the brokers scramble for last minute sales in order to lock down the partnership. Chelsea and Victoria take turns trying to sell the mansion of an old man who wants to continue living there. Amir meets with a concussed linebacker who can't remember his own name while Baxter sells to a guy with a golddigger girlfriend, and Andrew takes a shot at the lottery millionaires. Guest Starring Jon Gabrus as Jumbo Haynes, Andy Daly as Don Dimello

=== Season 2 (2016) ===
No. overall	No. in season	Title	Directed by	Written by	Original release date
10	1	"Victoria Awakens"	Alex Fernie	Kulap Vilaysack	October 13, 2016
The brokers grapple with a new status quo and a newly empowered Glenn, while Victoria wallows in her depression. Dean announces his quest to win a Diamond Dealmaker Award. Glenn explores roleplay, while Amir hires a human bloodhound. Guest Starring Zach Galifianakis as The Bloodhound, Casey Wilson as Jen Co-Starring Craig Cackowski as Todd The Janitor, Ali Ghandour as Hernum, Emily C. Chang as Klea
11	2	"Farsi Lessons"	Brad Morris	Brad Morris	October 13, 2016
Amir leads Victoria into an embarrassing trap, the Bros meet an even more obnoxious bro who’s looking for the ultimate sex pad, while rival brokers Serge and Gio decide to get rough with Glenn. Guest Starring Robert Ben Garant as Gio, Thomas Lennon as Serge, Paul Rust as Ricky Co-Starring Maz Jobrani as Farsi-speaking Client, Amir K as Delivery Guy
12	3	"Spiritual Gurus"	Kulap Vilaysack	Shauna McGarry	October 13, 2016
A pair of bizarre self help gurus guide the brokers through their pain. Victoria struggles with her real estate mogul/reality TV star dad’s high expectations, meanwhile Chelsea and Glenn take their relationship to the next level. Guest Starring Busy Philipps as Cate Kates, Dave Foley as Xavier King, Sam Pancake as Pyotr, Drew Droege as Grimsley Co-Starring Kirby Howell-Baptiste as Rezecca
13	4	"Baxter's Confession"	Alex Fernie	Jessica Gao	October 13, 2016
A freaked out Andrew hears Baxter possibly confess to a murder in his sleep, Glenn feels disrespected by Dean’s overbearing assistant. An ambitious indie filmmaker tries to pull a fast one on Victoria. Guest Starring Patton Oswalt as Derek Young Co-Starring Mary Sohn as Mara, Deanna Russo as Cindy Roost, Michael Cassady as Robbie Cass, Craig Cackowski as Todd the Janitor, Suzi Barrett as Angela
14	5	"Amir vs Dean"	Brad Morris	Alex Fernie	October 13, 2016
Amir risks it all by threatening Dean with knowledge of a devastating secret. Chelsea enlists a deep cover expert to help her rid a property of raccoons, Victoria deals with a delusional dog owner. Guest Starring "Weird Al" Yankovic as Tug Friendly, Lennon Parham as Carla Sutcliffe Co-Starring Ithamar Enriquez as Kebbin
15	6	"Snip Quit"	Kulap Vilaysack	Kate Berlant	October 13, 2016
Chelsea goes viral with a new Snip Quit app that tells you if you should get bangs, Glenn sells to a gangster rapper with a secret soft spot, and Amir faces off with the bad boys of Infinity Firm, Serge and Gio. Guest Starring Robert Ben Garant as Gio, Thomas Lennon as Serge, Zeke Nicholson as Just Mac Co-Starring Christina Anthony as Marigold, Brad Morris as Uri Lurie
16	7	"Predator Party"	Alex Fernie	Kevin Seccia	October 13, 2016
Glenn throws a doomed Predator-themed party for Dean. Victoria and Amir do battle with the help of their two toughest clients, Chelsea negotiates with Vitali, a dangerous Eastern Bloc mobster. Guest Starring John Hennigan as Brash Roderick, Nick Kroll as Graham Simon, Kendra Smith as Athena Co-Starring Jeremy Rowley as Vitali, Mary Sohn as Mara
17	8	"Day of the Diamond Dealmakers"	Kulap Vilaysack	Kulap Vilaysack	October 13, 2016
It’s finally the day of the big award show and everyone’s on edge. Victoria meets with her loser ex-boyfriend, the Bros handle a client with a terrible poker face and Dean makes a pact with Serge and Gio. Guest Starring Robert Ben Garant as Gio, Thomas Lennon as Serge, Jack McBrayer as Phillib Almnall, Randall Park as Grieg Co-Starring Carlos Santos as Vaul
18	9	"Night of the Diamond Dealmakers"	Alex Fernie	Brad Morris	October 13, 2016
It’s the night of the award show. Platinum competes for the biggest prize in real estate, Victoria meets her destiny, the Bros tear the house down with a stunning dance number, and a relationship is destroyed forever. Guest Starring Robert Ben Garant as Gio, Thomas Lennon as Serge Co-Starring Candace Brown as Jeannie Marchand, Madison Hildebrand as himself, Carlos Santos as Vaul, Carl Tart as Eugene "Rocket" Jackson, Janie Haddad Tompkins as Stoffanie Michaels

=== Season 3 (2017) ===
No. overall	No. in season	Title	Directed by	Written by	Original release date
19	1	"Dean's Legacy"	Kulap Vilaysack	Kulap Vilaysack	June 1, 2017
Dean will choose a realtor to write the foreword to his autobiography; Amir tries to end his sales slump; Dean's son D.J. runs the office while new "emo Glen" wallows in depression; Baxter shows a house to a doula. Guest starring: Rhys Darby as Stevahn Rabren, Kate Berlant as Morningstar.
20	2	"A Divided House"	Kulap Vilaysack	Shauna McGarry	June 1, 2017
Baxter and Andrew are still fighting and can't make a sale, forcing Amir to intervene; Victoria tries to make girl friends and joins a cult; Dean visits with a book editor. Guest starring: Stephanie Allynne as Aisha, Mary Holland as Missy, Lauren Lapkus as Nadine, Nicole Parker as Gwentolyn Swanson, Erin Whitehead as Tess, Deanna Cheng as Leshley Archer.
21	3	"Chelsea Leight-Leigh Lately"	Seth Morris	Alex Fernie	June 1, 2017
Chelsea goes on a tech detox; Andrew and Baxter sell a house for a guitarist who played on "Smooth"; Amir mistakes bribery for flirtation; Glenn pitches Dean his forward. Guest starring: Craig Cackowski as Todd, Sarah Silverman as Zars St. Lars, Gillian Jacobs as Jenny Tanner, Mano Agapian as Stavros, Keiko Agena as Tamamara.
22	4	"Disaster Drills"	Alex Fernie	Seth Morris	June 1, 2017
Dean puts Baxter's, Chelsea's, and Victoria's emergency preparedness to the test; Amir tutors a client with financial problems and unexpected visitors; Andrew shows a house to an erotica writer; D.J. and Glenn bond over prank calls. Guest starring: Maribeth Monroe as Merry Capshaw, Steven Yeun as Eric, Aaron Takahashi as Donny, Earl Baylon as Alan, Ann Maddox as Heather
23	5	"The Wheelbarrows"	Kulap Vilaysack	Kevin Seccia	June 1, 2017
Baxter and Chelsea start a band; Victoria hosts an open house; Dean appears on The Real Estate Show to promote his book; Glenn shows a house to an objectophile; Amir and Glenn make up over a coffee incident. Guest starring: June Diane Raphael as Sabra, Jessica St. Clair as Leatha Benet, Howard Kremer as Gerald.
24	6	"The Platinum Curse"	Alex Fernie	Matt McConkey	June 1, 2017
Victoria adopts a creepy doll; D.J. tries to bond with Amir; Glenn interrupts a robbery and tries to list a horror movie star's property; Dean records an answering machine greeting. Guest starring: James Adomian as Maximillian Blanc, Craig Cackowski as Todd, Alex Fernie as Hank, Todd Fasen as Lou, Alex Berg as Karl.
25	7	"Looking Forward"	Kulap Vilaysack	Seth Morris	June 1, 2017
Andrew and Baxter co-list a house with Rocket Jackson; Chelsea shows a house to a buyer concerned with whale attacks; Dean hires photographer Jerry for his book's dust cover. Guest starring: Jason Mantzoukas as Jerry, Jessica St. Clair as Leatha Benet, Carl Tart as Eugene "Rocket" Jackson, Bret McKenzie as Huck, Kulap Vilaysack as Cassandra, Mano Agapian as Stavros, Marcy Jarreau as Shargaret Talume.
26	8	"Bookend"	Seth Morris	Shauna McGarry	June 1, 2017
After collapsing, Dean is in a coma; D.J. insists that the book release party go on; Amir wakes up Dean and kidnaps him; Chelsea accidentally eats meat; Glenn creates an online dating profile. Guest starring: Craig Cackowski as Todd, Nicole Parker as Gwentolyn Swanson, Dave Foley as Xavier King, Owen Burke as Richolas Burkas.

=== Season 4 (2019) ===
No. overall	No. in season	Title	Directed by	Written by	Original release date
27	1	"Missing Dean"	Kulap Vilaysack	Seth Morris	August 5, 2019
D.J. has been in charge of Platinum Realty for six months; Amir, who has started smuggling rare birds, shows a house to a very touchy client; Victoria tries to find Dean and discovers that Glenn is his son; Baxter and Andrew deal with a very childish client; Glenn hires a team of matchmakers; Dean reappears from hiding. Guest starring: Adam Pally as Braden Bryce Howard, Laura Krafft as Agneta, Nicole Byer as Mandine Chinton, Jamie Denbo as Beverly, Jessica Chaffin as Ronna, Shauna McGarry as Shaunia, Deborah Tarica as Brethany.
28	2	"Royale Pains"	Seth Morris	Alex Fernie	August 5, 2019
Dean goes back to being a broker and faces a figure from his past; Glenn shows a house to a prince; Chelsea gets involved in a business opportunity. Guest starring: Jessica St. Clair as Leatha Benet, Dana Carvey as Prince Borislav, Edgar Blackmon as Robin, Ben Schwartz as Quistian Gayle, Matt Gourley as Chavdar.
29	3	"Tough Love"	Alex Fernie	Kevin Seccia	August 6, 2019
Amir sells a house for a divorcing couple; Glenn goes on a date; Andrew and Baxter order sandwiches; Victoria appears on her father's show The King Maker; Dean meets with old rivals. Guest starring: John Gemberling as Bart, David Walton as Wilham Murghey, Whitney Cummings as Elizageth Murghey, Alicia Silverstone as Annabelle Shelly, Dave Foley as Xavier King, Robert Ben Garant as Gio, Thomas Lennon as Serge, Deborah Tarica as Brethany, Jessica Jean Jardine as Inkrid.
30	4	"Stapler's Monster"	Alex Fernie	Kulap Vilaysack	August 6, 2019
Victoria meets with the "Property brothers"; Andrew and Baxter go undercover; Dean struggles to fit in; Glenn has an encounter with Serge and Gio. Guest starring: Randy Sklar as Craigory, Jason Sklar as Georch, Robert Ben Garant as Gio, Thomas Lennon as Serge, Ben Schwartz as Quistian Gayle, Mano Agapion as Stavros.
31	5	"Good Todd Hunting"	Kulap Vilaysack	Matt McConkey	August 7, 2019
Andrew comes under questioning for a property he sold; Baxter shows a home to his exes; Amir and Victoria bump into Serge and Gio; Dean and Todd go to couples therapy at D.J.'s behest. Guest starring: Craig Cackowski as Todd, Rich Fulcher as Doctor Chambong, Tom Lenk as Brandoon, Jack Plotnick as Gizzy, Rob Corddry as Inspector Suggs, Robert Ben Garant as Gio, Thomas Lennon as Serge, Melissa Stephens as Yamy Goodwin, Matt McConkey as Fat Adam.
32	6	"Love Is the Most Dangerous Game"	Seth Morris	Alex Fernie	August 7, 2019
Dean and a rival need Dean's help; Andrew's showing turns personal; Chelsea and Amir have lunch; Baxter's boyfriend visits. Guest starring: Marc Evan Jackson as Dickie Chambers, Mary Elizabeth Ellis as Wivian Turnter, John Gemberling as Barl, Allan McLeod as Jeffney Buckley.
33	7	"Held Breath"	Kulap Vilaysack	Mike Hanford	August 8, 2019
Glenn has an exacting and personal client; Chelsea shows a house to a scientist; Baxter gets inside information. Guest starring: Ginger Gonzaga as Julianka, Gary Anthony Williams as Neil deCicely Tyson, Chris Parnell as Walton Rothchild, Pam Murphy as Maria.
34	8	"Family Matters"	Kulap Vilaysack	Shauna McGarry	August 8, 2019
At Glenn's wedding, emotions boil over, truths are revealed, and a vote is held. Guest starring: Laura Krafft as Agneta, Carl Tart as Eugene "Rocket" Jackson, Rich Fulcher as Doctor Chambong, Ginger Gonzaga as Julianka, Mary Sohn as Maria.

== 2017 campaign to save Bajillion Dollar Propertie$ ==
On August 9, 2017 it was announced that NBC would be shutting down Seeso. A web campaign to "#BuyJillion" quickly formed to encourage another network or streaming service to pick up the show for future seasons. On July 15, 2019, it was reported that Pluto TV would air the previously unseen fourth season of Bajillion Dollar Propertie$.
