= Michael Bolton's Big, Sexy Valentine's Day Special =

- Written by: Scott Aukerman; Dave Ferguson; Mike Hanford; Tim Kalpakis; Joe Saunders; Akiva Schaffer
- Directed by: Akiva Schaffer; Scott Aukerman
- Starring: Michael Bolton
- Composer: Greg Chun
- Country of origin: United States

Production
- Executive producers: Scott Aukerman; Michael Bolton; Akiva Schaffer; David Jargowsky; Christina Kline; Lisa Nishimura; Robbie Praw
- Producers: Russell Sanzgiri; Jason Korstad; Joe Saunders
- Cinematography: Dan Adlerstein
- Editor: Hank Friedmann
- Running time: 54 minutes

Original release
- Network: Netflix
- Release: February 7, 2017

Michael Bolton's Big, Sexy Valentine's Day Special is a Netflix variety special starring Michael Bolton and created by The Lonely Island. It was released on Netflix on February 7, 2017.

== Plot ==
When Santa's elves make too many toys for Christmas, Michael Bolton must star in a Valentine's Day special to encourage couples to have sex and conceive 75,000 babies.

== Cast ==
- Michael Bolton as himself
- Sarah Shahi as Carmela
- Adam Scott as himself
- Jimmy Graham as Santa Claus
- Grey Griffin as Announcer
- Brooke Shields as herself
- Janeane Garofalo as herself
- Louie Anderson as himself
- Sinbad as himself
- Andy Richter as himself
- Bob Saget as himself
- Sarah Silverman as Misty
- Randall Park as Blair
- Andy Samberg as Kenny G
- Kenny G as Janitor
- Fred Armisen as Peter Salanz
- Colton Dunn as Chocolatier Customer
- Jorma Taccone as Punk Rocker
- Michael Sheen as Carl Flossy
- Akiva Schaffer as Alan
- Chris Parnell as Dr. Vince Harbert
- Mircea Monroe as Virtual Woman
- Sal Stowers as Virtual Pharmacist
- Maya Rudolph as herself
- Tim Robinson as Chef Roy
- David Theune as Darryl
- Baron Vaughn as Ben
- Maya Erskine as Susan
- Mary Holland as Dianne
- Will Forte as Michael Fulton
- Eric André as Baby Archer
- Luka Jones as Wally
- Casey Wilson as herself
- Scott Aukerman as Security Guard #1
- Nicole Byer as Security Guard #2

== Reception ==
Sophie Gilbert of The Atlantic called Michael Bolton's Big, Sexy Valentine's Day Special "a sparkling and star-studded oddity that’s part-PBS telethon and part-depraved sex comedy... At its best, it’s a glorious, only partly ironic homage to the vocal power and unfettered sexual magnetism of one of the most indelible figures in balladry. At its worst, it’s baffling." Esther Zuckerman of The A.V. Club called the special "a hilarious assault on the very idea of conventional, heteronormative sexiness. It’s ideal Valentine’s Day programming for people who hate the nonsensical commercialism of Valentine’s Day and for anyone who can’t resist unfettered silliness."
