= The Birthday Boys (TV series) =

American television series

- Genre: Sketch comedy
- Starring: Jefferson Dutton; Dave Ferguson; Mike Hanford; Tim Kalpakis; Matt Kowalick; Mike Mitchell; Chris VanArtsdalen
- Country of origin: United States
- Original language: English
- No. of seasons: 2
- No. of episodes: 20

Production
- Executive producers: Bob Odenkirk; Ben Stiller; Debbie Liebling; Stuart Cornfeld; Mike Rosenstein; Dave Kneebone
- Producer: Carl Fieler
- Camera setup: Single camera
- Running time: 22–23 minutes
- Production companies: Red Hour Productions; Principato-Young Entertainment; The Birthday Boys; Abso Lutely; IFC Original Productions

Original release
- Network: IFC
- Release: October 18, 2013 – December 19, 2014

The Birthday Boys is an American sketch comedy television series that premiered on IFC on October 18, 2013, starring the sketch comedy troupe of the same name. The show's two seasons consisted of ten episodes each.

== Cast ==
- Jefferson Dutton
- Dave Ferguson
- Mike Hanford
- Tim Kalpakis
- Matt Kowalick
- Mike Mitchell
- Chris VanArtsdalen

=== Recurring ===
- Bob Odenkirk

== Episodes ==
=== Series overview ===
Season	Episodes	Originally aired	
Season	Episodes	First aired	Last aired
1	10	October 18, 2013	December 20, 2013
2	10	October 17, 2014	December 19, 2014

=== Season 1 (2013) ===
No. overall	No. in season	Title	Original release date
1	1	"Paychecks!"	October 18, 2013
2	2	"Goofy Roofers"	October 25, 2013
Guest star: French Stewart
3	3	"Catching up on Shows"	November 1, 2013
4	4	"Rock and Roll"	November 8, 2013
Guest stars: Ben Stiller, Matt Besser and Frank Caliendo
5	5	"Cool Machine"	November 15, 2013
Guest star: Tia Carrere
6	6	"Helpful Tips"	November 22, 2013
7	7	"Skewered!"	November 29, 2013
8	8	"All Your Favorites Are Back"	December 6, 2013
9	9	"Going All the Way"	December 13, 2013
Guest stars: Natasha Leggero and Paget Brewster
10	10	"Dumb Public"	December 20, 2013

=== Season 2 (2014) ===
No. overall	No. in season	Title	Original release date	US viewers (millions)
11	1	"Snobs and Slobs"	October 17, 2014	0.031
Guest stars: Dana Carvey, Fabio, Monica Ruiz, and Paul Scheer
12	2	"Wet Dreams May Come"	October 24, 2014	0.081
Guest stars: Bob Odenkirk and Helen Slayton-Hughes
13	3	"Women Are Funny"	October 31, 2014	0.061
Guest stars: Sandra Bernhard, Garfunkel and Oates, Ellie Kemper, Lennon Parham, June Diane Raphael and Casey Wilson
14	4	"Freshy's"	November 7, 2014	0.035
Guest stars: Scott Aukerman, Jack Black and Kyle Gass
15	5	"Love Date Hump"	November 14, 2014	0.028
Guest stars: Chloe Bennet, Carmen Electra and Jennette McCurdy
16	6	"Getting Preachy"	November 21, 2014	0.102
Guest stars: Horatio Sanz and Fred Willard
17	7	"The Plight of the Working Class"	November 28, 2014	0.039
Guest stars: Tim Heidecker, Eric Wareheim and Clint Howard
18	8	"The U.S. Healthcare System"	December 5, 2014	0.061
Guest star: Chris Elliott
19	9	"Cerf's Folly"	December 12, 2014	0.034
Guest stars: Tony Hale and Thomas Lennon
20	10	"Season Finale"	December 19, 2014	0.084
Guest stars: Matt Besser and Corey Feldman

== Legacy ==
In 2013, members of The Birthday Boys Mike Hanford, Tim Kalpakis, and Jefferson Dutton formed The Sloppy Boys, a comedy rock band. In 2020, they started a podcast by the same name.
