= Upright Citizens Brigade =

New York and Los Angeles-based improv and sketch comedy troupe

- Formation: 1990; 36 years ago
- Founders: Amy Poehler, Matthew Walsh, Matt Besser, Ian Roberts, Adam McKay, Rick Roman, Horatio Sanz and Drew Franklin
- Type: Theatre group
- Purpose: Improvisational comedy; sketch comedy; stand-up comedy; surreal humor; theater; variety shows
- Location(s): Chicago, Illinois, U.S. (1990–1996); New York City (1996–present); Los Angeles (2005–present); Pittsburgh (2025–present); Austin (2025–present); Edinburgh (2026–present)
- Website: ucbcomedy.com

The Upright Citizens Brigade (UCB) is an improvisational and sketch comedy group that emerged from Chicago's ImprovOlympic in 1990. The original incarnation of the group consisted of Amy Poehler, Matthew Walsh, Matt Besser, Ian Roberts, Adam McKay, Horatio Sanz and Drew Franklin. Other early members included Neil Flynn, Armando Diaz, Ali Farahnakian and Rich Fulcher. The group was named by McKay's friend Rick Roman, who was not a member.

In addition to live performance, the Upright Citizens Brigade expanded into teaching and training, as well as television, film, and digital media. Members of the original group created and starred in multiple television series and films, appeared regularly on late-night television, and developed improv formats that were adapted for broadcast. UCB also produced web series beginning in the late 2000s and entered into a first-look production deal.

Alumni of the UCB community have gone on to create and staff numerous television programs, contributing to the organization's broader influence on American comedy; Saturday Night Live, for example, has been known for seeking top talent from UCB's pool of students. In addition, TV shows like The Chris Gethard Show, created by Chris Gethard; and Broad City, created by Abbi Jacobson and Ilana Glazer, started out as UCB experiments.

== History ==
The Upright Citizens Brigade began performing improv and sketch comedy at Kill the Poet in Chicago in 1991. Their first show was called Virtual Reality. The group followed with shows titled UCBTV, Conference on the Future of Happiness, Thunderball, Bucket of Truth, Big Dirty Hands, The Real Real World, and Punch Your Friend in the Face.

In 1993, the Upright Citizens Brigade — Matt Besser, Ian Roberts, Amy Poehler, Adam McKay, and Horatio Sanz — were regular guests on stage at the New Variety, produced and hosted by Richard O'Donnell at the Chicago Improv comedy club, 504 N. Wells.

In 1996, prior to opening their own theater, the Upright Citizens Brigade relocated to New York City, where they performed their signature improv show, ASSSSCAT, first at KGB Bar and later at Solo Arts. Solo Arts became the first semi-permanent home to the Upright Citizens Brigade's "Harold Teams" and is considered by some to be the group's first theater.

In March 2022, UCB was acquired by Mike McAvoy (former CEO/owner of The Onion) and Jimmy Miller (co-founder of Mosaic talent management), with financial backing from Elysian Park Ventures.

In 2025, UCB acquired a stake in Bottlerocket Social Hall in Pittsburgh and purchased Coldtowne Theater in Austin, announcing plans to open UCB Training Centers alongside the existing venues, which opened later the same year.

In February of 2026, UCB announced plans to bring their classes to Edinburgh in partnership with Monkey Barrel Comedy.

== Philosophy ==
The Upright Citizens Brigade Theatre Training Center teaches long-form improv, sketch, writing, parts of directing, and various other comedy skills. The training center's philosophy of improv is based largely on the teachings of Del Close, with a strong emphasis on the "game" of the scene. The primary improvisational form is "The Harold", and the theater in all its incarnations has had a group of "Harold Teams", house teams that perform regularly.

In 2013, Besser, Roberts and Walsh co-authored a manual titled The Upright Citizens Brigade Comedy Improvisation Manual.

== Theatres and locations ==
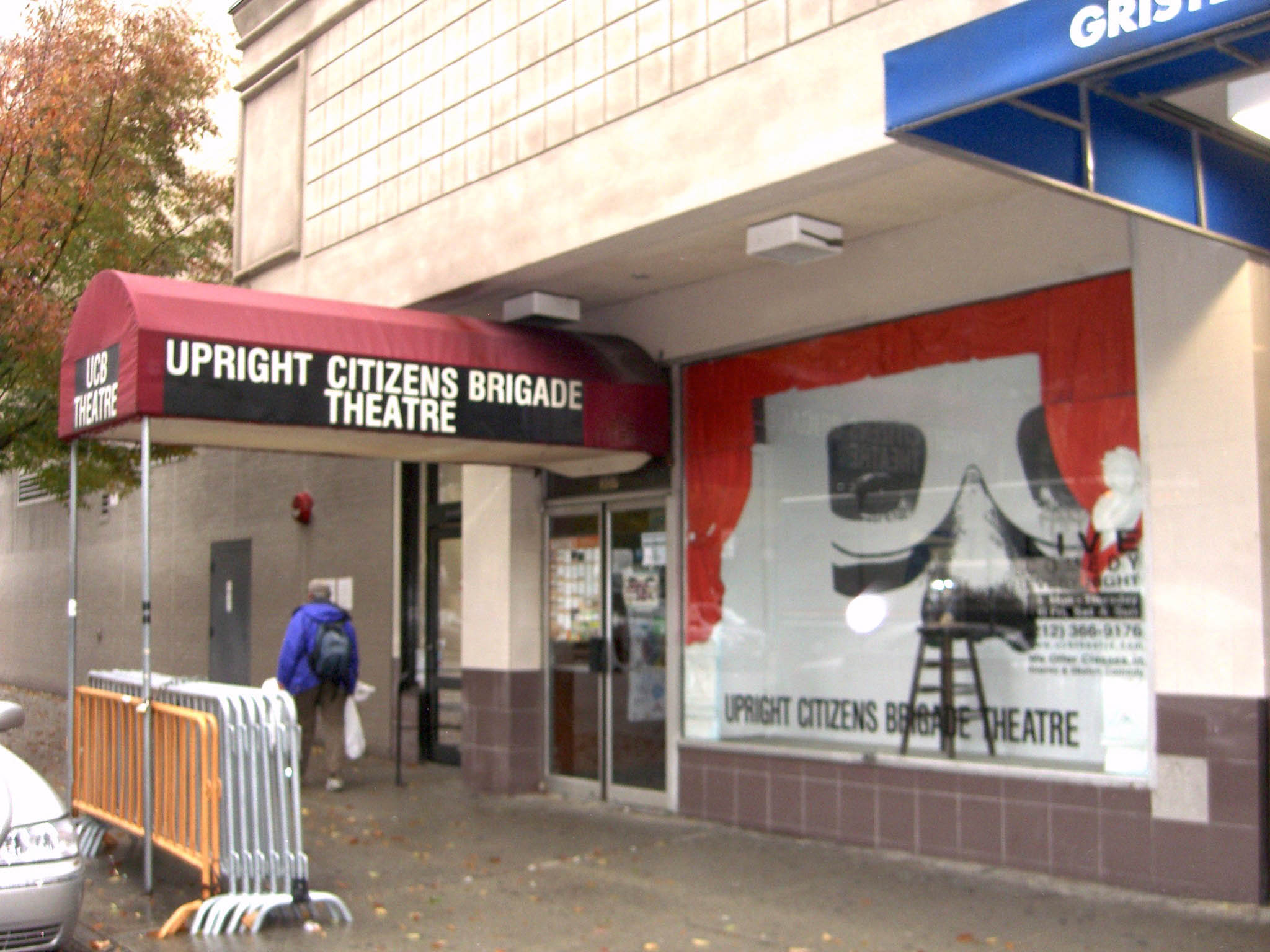
The Upright Citizens Brigade Theatre on West 26th Street in Manhattan, a former location

The Upright Citizens Brigade Theatre (shortened to UCB Theatre or just UCB) is an American improvisational and sketch comedy training center and theatre, originally founded by UCB troupe members Matt Besser, Amy Poehler, Ian Roberts and Matt Walsh.

Current UCB Theatre locations are at 242 E. 14th Street in New York City, and 5919 Franklin Avenue in Hollywood. UCB Training Centers are located at 831 E Warrington Ave in Pittsburgh, and 1700 E 2nd St in Austin.

=== New York City ===
The popularity of the Upright Citizens Brigade's shows and classes at Manhattan's Solo Arts led to the opening of the first official Upright Citizens Brigade Theatre at 161 W. 22nd Street in Chelsea on February 4, 1999. The 75-seat space, formerly the Harmony Burlesque Theater, closed on November 18, 2002, following fire code violations.

After temporary residencies at the Access Theater and Chelsea Playhouse, the company relocated again. On April 1, 2003, the Upright Citizens Brigade Theatre opened its second official New York location at 307 West 26th Street in the former Maverick Theater, a 150-seat venue with expanded facilities.

In September 2011, UCB opened a second New York theater on the Lower East Side, at 153 E. 3rd Street, commonly referred to as "UCB East" or "the Beast". The venue permanently closed on February 9, 2019.

In October 2017, UCB announced that its Chelsea theater would close; it subsequently relocated to 555 West 42nd Street in Hell's Kitchen.

The COVID-19 pandemic forced UCB to close both New York locations in April 2020.

In June 2023, UCB announced its return to New York City at 242 E. 14th Street. The venue officially reopened in September 2024.

=== Los Angeles ===
In 2005, the Los Angeles branch of the theater opened at 5919 Franklin Avenue in Hollywood, offering nightly improv, sketch, and stand-up comedy performances. Soon after, Comedy Bang! Bang! (formerly Comedy Death-Ray), a popular Los Angeles alternative comedy show, moved from its former home at the M Bar to join the Upright Citizens Brigade Theatre.

An LA expansion began in 2014 with the opening of UCB Theatre Sunset at 5419 Sunset Boulevard. The venue played home to Upright Citizens Brigade's training center, an 85-seat theatre, cafe/performance space called Inner Sanctum, and video production offices. The Sunset location was sold in December 2020, leaving the Franklin Avenue theater as UCB's only owned venue in Los Angeles. Under new UCB management, the Los Angeles theater reopened in September 2022.

=== Pittsburgh ===
UCB acquired a stake in Bottlerocket Social Hall, a renowned music and comedy venue in the Allentown neighborhood of Pittsburgh on June 2nd, 2025. A new Training Center was opened nearby that August, exclusively offering UCB classes to students for the first time outside of Los Angeles or New York City. Unlike other UCB venues, Bottlerocket is not strictly an improv or comedy venue, and continues to regularly book touring bands, standup comedians, dance parties, and more - alongside UCB affiliated events and shows.

=== Austin ===
UCB purchased Coldtowne Theater in Austin in May, 2025, maintaining the theaters location at 1700 E 2nd St. UCB classes were offered alongside Coldtowne's existing training operations beginning in August of 2025.. Coldtownes existing improv teams and shows continue to run alongside the new UCB style programming and training.

=== Edinburgh ===
A partnership with Edinburgh comedy venue Monkey Barrel was announced on February 12th, 2026 - bringing UCB classes to the UK for the first time.

== Screen ventures ==
The original group — Matt Besser, Matt Walsh, Ian Roberts, and Amy Poehler — have had two TV shows — Upright Citizens Brigade (1998–2000) and The UCB Show (2015–2017) — and their show ASSSSCAT has been televised twice. In addition, they had a TV movie called Escape From It's a Wonderful Life and appeared weekly on Late Night with Conan O'Brien in the 1990s.

In 2002 they created and starred in the film Martin & Orloff, and made another movie in 2007 titled Wild Girls Gone. Neither film was particularly successful or well received.

The group has participated in web series, including the ongoing series UCB Comedy Originals, created in 2008, which occasionally shows sketches; and I Hate Being Single, created in 2012.

Sketch comedy group The Birthday Boys were discovered by Bob Odenkirk at UCB Los Angeles. He produced their 2012 TV show for IFC.

In 2016, Universal Cable Productions announced signing Upright Citizens Brigade to a first-look production deal.

== Notable alumni ==
- Aziz Ansari
- Anthony Atamanuik
- Leigh Daniel Avidan
- Emily Axford
- Matt Besser - founder
- Nicole Byer
- Kay Cannon
- D'Arcy Carden
- Neil Casey
- Adam Conover
- Jeremy Culhane
- Andrew Daly
- Katie Dippold
- Jefferson Dutton
- Ayo Edebiri
- Chris Gethard
- Ilana Glazer
- Donald Glover
- Mike Hanford
- Ed Helms
- Rob Huebel
- Brian Huskey
- Abbi Jacobson
- Tim Kalpakis
- Ellie Kemper
- Kirby Howell-Baptiste
- Jordan Klepper
- Nick Kroll
- Jason Mantzoukas
- Jessica McKenna
- Kate McKinnon
- Vic Michaelis
- Kyle Mooney
- Seth Morris
- Bobby Moynihan
- Brennan Lee Mulligan
- Ego Nwodim
- Lennon Parham
- Aubrey Plaza
- Amy Poehler - founder
- June Diane Raphael
- Sam Riegel
- Rob Riggle
- Ian Roberts - founder
- Matt Rogers
- Paul Scheer
- Ben Schwartz
- Hannah Solow
- Jessica St. Clair
- Drew Tarver
- Kelly Marie Tran
- Milana Vayntrub
- Matt Walsh - founder
- Casey Wilson
- Zach Woods
- Bowen Yang
- Sasheer Zamata

== See also ==
- The Second City
- The Groundlings
- ImprovOlympic
- Under the Gun Theater
- Annoyance Theatre
- Improv Asylum
- Magnet Theater
- The Midnight Show
- The Peoples Improv Theater
