= Jefferson Dutton =

American director, comedian, and musician

- Born: May 8, 1983 (age 43); Nashua, New Hampshire
- Other names: Jeff Dutton; Dutts
- Education: Ithaca College
- Occupations: Director; comedian; musician; podcaster; producer; writer; actor
- Years active: 2002–present
- Organization: Directors Guild of America
- Agent(s): Ben Rossman, Dynamic Talent
- Known for: Comedy
- Television: The Birthday Boys
- Website: jeffersondutton.com

Jefferson "Dutts" Dutton (born May 8, 1983) is a Los Angeles comedian, actor, director, producer, podcaster, and musician. He started his career in production before forming The Birthday Boys sketch group with fellow Ithaca College graduates in Hollywood, Los Angeles.

In 2013, Dutton started his band, The Sloppy Boys, with fellow Birthday Boys Mike Hanford and Tim Kalpakis. In 2020, the trio started a podcast by the same name.

== Early life ==
Dutton was born in Nashua, New Hampshire. He graduated from Bishop Guertin High School. His parents owned a chocolate factory.

Dutton studied film at Ithaca College in Ithaca, New York.

== Early career ==
=== Sketch comedy ===
Dutton began his career in Hollywood, Los Angeles. In 2007, he started a sketch comedy group, The Birthday Boys with friends he met at Ithaca College. They quickly came to prominence on the Internet, with Dutton also making sketch comedy videos for Funny or Die and Yahoo TV's show Sketchy.

The Birthday Boys were discovered at Upright Citizens Brigade by Bob Odenkirk, who took it upon himself to produce their self-titled TV show on IFC. The show premiered on October 18, 2013. It has since been recognized as a cult classic.

== Music ==
=== The Sloppy Boys (band) ===
In 2013, Dutton started a Weezer cover band, The Sloppy Boys Jangly Band with fellow members of the Birthday Boys Tim Kalpakis and Mike Hanford in Los Feliz, Los Angeles. The group's name was later shortened to The Sloppy Boys. The band started writing original music in 2018.

During the COVID-19 lockdowns in 2020, the band started doing weekly "Zoom Rooms" to promote their third album, Paradiso, and connected with fans worldwide.

The Sloppy Boys were the subject of the 2023 documentary film Blood, Sweat and Beers, or How the Sloppy Boys Made an Album on a Farm in West Texas. It followed their five days of production with Money Mark of Beastie Boys fame, and won the Audience Award at the 2024 El Paso Film Festival in El Paso, Texas.

=== Dutts ===
Dutts is Dutton's "homemade pop star" persona. His debut solo album, Beyond Cool, was released July 28, 2023.

He released a remix album, Way Past Cool, the next year, on July 19, 2024.

==== Tour ====
Dutts' first solo tour, supporting Kenny Gray, began on June 24, 2026 in New York City.

Date	City	Venue	Notes
June 24, 2026	New York City	Bowery Place	
June 25, 2026	Boston	Middle East	
June 27, 2026	Philadelphia	Kung Fu Necktie	
July 9, 2026	Los Angeles	Zebulon	
July 10, 2026	Seattle	Barboza	
July 11, 2026	Chicago	Subterranean	

=== The Sloppy Boys (podcast) ===
Riding the momentum of their Zoom rooms, The Sloppy Boys started a self-titled weekly cocktail podcast on October 22, 2020. Their goal was to drink their way through the International Bartenders Association's official cocktail list. They launched their Patreon bonus show, The Sloppy Boys Blowout the same week.

=== Discography ===
Release Date	Title	Artist	Ref.
July 29, 2024	Sonic Ranch	The Sloppy Boys	
July 19, 2024	Way Past Cool	Dutts	
July 28, 2023	Beyond Cool	Dutts	
July 31, 2020	Paradiso	The Sloppy Boys	
September 6, 2019	Dancing on the Wind	The Sloppy Boys	
June 19, 2018	Lifelong Vacation	The Sloppy Boys	

== Writing ==
Year	Title	Type	Notes	Ref.
2013-2014	The Birthday Boys	TV show		
2010	2010 MTV Movie Awards	Awards show		
2002	Brotherhood	Film		

== Production ==
=== Editing ===
Year	Title	For	Ref.
2023	Cole Sprouse Nails Modern Suiting at Vogue World: London	Vogue	
2020	How Adriana Lima Packs for a Transcontinental Trip	Vogue	
2019	After Hours with Josh Horowitz	Comedy Central	

=== Directing ===
Year	Title	Type	For	Ref.
2023	Fine Dining	short film	Michael Blaiklock	
2022	Matilda	music video	PUP	
2018	Sketchy (Yahoo TV series)	tv series	Yahoo	
