= The UCB Show =

- Genre: Sketch comedy
- Starring: Matt Besser; Amy Poehler; Ian Roberts; Matt Walsh
- Country of origin: United States
- Original language: English
- No. of seasons: 2
- No. of episodes: 16

Production
- Running time: 30 minutes

Original release
- Network: Seeso
- Release: December 3, 2015 – January 12, 2017

The UCB Show is an American sketch comedy series that premiered on December 3, 2015 via the Seeso comedy subscription streaming service. The series features members of Upright Citizens Brigade, an improvisational sketch comedy group. The cast includes Matt Besser, Amy Poehler, Ian Roberts, and Matt Walsh, the same actors that appeared on Upright Citizens Brigade, the previous show that aired on Comedy Central in the 1990s. The variety series features various sketches, characters and stand-up shows from the Upright Citizens Brigade theatres in Los Angeles and New York. The show is hosted by the original actors of the theatre and filmed in front of a live studio audience. The UCB Show was renewed for a second season, which premiered January 12, 2017.
