= List of Comedy Bang! Bang! (TV series) episodes =

Comedy Bang! Bang! is a television series created and hosted by Scott Aukerman that aired weekly on IFC. The show is a spin-off of his podcast Comedy Bang! Bang! which airs on the Earwolf network. Like the podcast, the series features outlandish and farcical humor, often delivered in a deadpan manner. The show stars Scott Aukerman playing a fictional version of himself.

The following is a complete list of Comedy Bang! Bang! episodes.

== Series overview ==
Season	Episodes	Originally released	
Season	Episodes	First released	Last released
1	10	June 8, 2012	August 10, 2012
2	20	July 12, 2013	December 20, 2013
3	20	May 8, 2014	December 19, 2014
4	40	January 9, 2015	December 10, 2015
5	20	June 3, 2016	December 2, 2016

== Episodes ==
=== Season 1 (2012) ===
No. overall	No. in season	Title	Guest(s)	Original release date
1	1	"Zach Galifianakis Wears A Blue Jacket & Red Socks"	Zach Galifianakis, Andy Daly, Will Forte, Thomas Lennon & Gillian Jacobs	June 8, 2012
Reggie shares the song he wrote for Scott. Guy Benoit (Thomas Lennon) recommends wine throughout the show. Scott plays a game called "Tsk Tsk, Attaboy!" in which people on the street are presented with different scenarios (a man dropping his wallet or a crying baby locked inside a car) to see how they react. Scott and Zach Galifianakis discuss their favorite ways to laugh. Zach imagines what it would be like if dogs could talk. Danny Mahoney (Andy Daly) stops by to promote his new business in which he comes to your party and acts as the "life of the party." Scott feeds his parking meter. Chet Barnsider (Will Forte) describes how he landed a plane on a mall. The guests play a round of "What's in the Box?"
2	2	"Amy Poehler Wears A Black Jacket & Grey Pants"	Amy Poehler, Andy Daly, David Koechner, Tymberlee Hill & Brian Huskey	June 15, 2012
The episode is dedicated to Carl Langer, a crew member who died during the filming of the episode (though he shows up throughout the show in increasingly dangerous situations). Reggie and Scott describe the strange dreams they had about each other. Scott and Amy Poehler discuss her behavioral issues and the MAD Magazine parody of Parks and Recreation. Don Dimello (Andy Daly) stops by to discuss his upcoming production of Pinocchio. Scott goes to pick up his dry cleaning while Mr. Doublebutt (David Koechner) fills in as substitute host. Reggie premieres the trailer for his film "A Womb of One's Own," in which he plays an inattentive father who wishes he had never been born and then finds himself back in his mother's womb. The guests play a round of "What's the Song Title?" As the credits play, we find out how Carl died during filming.
3	3	"Jon Hamm Wears A Light Blue Shirt & Silver Watch"	Jon Hamm, Nick Kroll, Leo Allen, Brett Gelman, Eddie Pepitone, Neil Campbell & Andy Richter	June 22, 2012
Scott answers questions from Peter the Meter Reader (Neil Campbell). Scott tries to surprise a lucky viewer by visiting them at their home, but is beaten to it by Andy Richter. Jon Hamm describes an unusual day in his life. Scott embarrasses Jon by playing a clip from early in his career. Scott directs a scene in which Jon describes how he and Scott met. Phineas MacEnchee (Eddie Pepitone) is named Employee of the Week. Spanish radio personality El Chupacabra (Nick Kroll) stops by, does some impressions, and gives his slogans for Craigslist and The View. Brett Gelman tries to help a dog beat murder charges. Francis "Mr. Bicycle" Domingo (Leo Allen) discusses his ability to eat bicycles. Scott gives his opinions on Woody Allen, The Beatles, and roller coasters in the segment "Maybe It's Just Me But For Me."
4	4	"Michael Cera Wears A Blue Denim Shirt & Red Pants"	Michael Cera & Paul F. Tompkins	June 29, 2012
Scott and Reggie check the "watermelon cam," showing the aftermath of throwing watermelons off of the roof. Scott tries to surprise a fan with a home visit but when she's not home he tries to find her in the style of Law and Order. Michael Cera sit downs for an interview where he discusses his birth and the upcoming Angry Birds movie. Scott dies from a caffeine overdose and goes to Hell. Sir Couchly (the couch) complains about his job. Cake Boss (Paul F. Tompkins) stops by and describes how he was bitten by a cake bug and was given the gift of second sight. Reggie is upset by the amount of product placement in the show. Kid scientist Arlo Nadon demonstrates a chemical reaction. The guests play a round of "Which Came First?" Scott plays a highlight reel from the show and Michael Cera meets his demise.
5	5	"Seth Rogen Wears A Plaid Shirt & Brown Pants"	Seth Rogen, Bob Odenkirk, Casey Wilson, Will Arnett, Topher Grace & Fred Williamson	July 6, 2012
Scott welcomes guests Seth Rogen, bird caller Tommy Shalders (Bob Odenkirk), and still-life painter Eugenia Clemente (Casey Wilson). Two cameramen (Will Arnett and Topher Grace) get into an epic fight.
6	6	"Paul Rudd Wears A Red Lumberjack Flannel Shirt"	Paul Rudd, James Adomian, Matt Besser, Jamie Denbo, Chris Parnell, Colin Hanks, Todd Barry, Paul Rust & Brody Stevens	July 13, 2012
Scott welcomes guests Paul Rudd, television host Huell Howser (James Adomian), and trauma survivor Darren Montaigne (Matt Besser). Crowpoke, a robot crow, stops by to tell a riddle. After Crowpoke breaks down, his inventor (Chris Parnell) stops by to fix him. Scott's high school crush Cindy Linderman (Jamie Denbo) hangs around the studio.
7	7	"Ed Helms Wears A Grey Shirt & Brown Boots"	Ed Helms, Seth Morris, Owen Burke, Marisa Tomei, Jimmy Pardo, Matt Belknap, Harris Wittels & Susanna Hoffs	July 20, 2012
Scott welcomes guests Ed Helms, hypochondriac Bob Ducca (Seth Morris), and daredevil Level Knevel (Owen Burke). Tiny talk show host Smalley Wallace (Jimmy Pardo) interviews Marisa Tomei from inside Scott's wall.
8	8	"Elizabeth Banks Wears A Red Dress"	Elizabeth Banks, David Wain, Jon Daly, Thomas Lennon, Ian Roberts, Pauly Shore & Dave Thomas	July 27, 2012
Scott welcomes guests Elizabeth Banks, television critic Gordon Thatchet (David Wain), and saxophonist Barry R. (Jon Daly). Also Lil' Gary (Thomas Lennon) and Scott's dad (Dave Thomas) visit the studio.
9	9	"Adam Scott Wears A Red Oxford Shirt & Jeans"	Adam Scott, Paul F. Tompkins, Tim Heidecker, Andy Samberg, Patton Oswalt, & Bob Odenkirk	August 3, 2012
Scott welcomes guests Adam Scott, Sir Andrew Lloyd Webber (Paul F. Tompkins), and animal expert Phil Gorsley (Tim Heidecker). Scott asks his celebrity friends for advice. This episode was the first one shot and served as a pilot episode.
10	10	""Weird Al" Yankovic Wears A Hawaiian Shirt"	"Weird Al" Yankovic, David Cross, Kerri Kenney, Jack Black, Kyle Gass, Jon Heder & Paul Scheer	August 10, 2012
Scott welcomes guests "Weird Al" Yankovic, chef Bellini Pastafangu (David Cross), and the woman with the world's largest collection of potato chips that look like celebrities Meryl Hmm (Kerri Kenny). Also a musical performance by Tenacious D (Jack Black and Kyle Gass).

=== Season 2 (2013) ===
No. overall	No. in season	Title	Guest(s)	Original release date
11	1	"Andy Samberg Wears A Plaid Shirt & Glasses"	Andy Samberg, Jordan Peele, Lance Reddick, Selma Blair, Doug Benson, Adam Pally & Chelsea Peretti	July 12, 2013
Scott welcomes guests Andy Samberg and renowned psychic Tan Fu (Jordan Peele). Reggie has an adventure in a cybernetic computer world.
12	2	"Aziz Ansari Wears A Charcoal Blazer"	Aziz Ansari, Nick Kroll, Christopher Meloni, Echo Kellum, Kulap Vilaysack & Cedric Yarbrough	July 19, 2013
Scott welcomes guests Aziz Ansari and craft services co-ordinator Fabrice Fabrice (Nick Kroll). A team of scientists (Christopher Meloni, Echo Kellum, Kulap Vilaysack) help Scott get rid of his cold.
13	3	"Anna Kendrick Wears A Patterned Blouse & Burgundy Pants"	Anna Kendrick & Ben Schwartz	July 26, 2013
Scott welcomes guests Anna Kendrick and celebrity publicist Rodney Wayber (Ben Schwartz). The studio takes on a tropical twist when Reggie purchases a Bahama Mama Maker.
14	4	"David Cross Wears A Red Polo Shirt & Brown Shoes With Red Laces"	David Cross, Will Forte, Tim Meadows, Bob Odenkirk, "Weird Al" Yankovic, Neil Campbell, Lauren Lapkus & Paul Rust	August 2, 2013
Scott welcomes guests David Cross and Senatorial candidate Felix Dewhurst (Will Forte). The story of Comedy Bang! Bang! is narrated by the show's custodian (Tim Meadows) and an overzealous marshal (Bob Odenkirk) arrives to set up a search party when Reggie temporarily goes missing.
15	5	"Zoe Saldana Wears A Tan Blouse & Glasses"	Zoe Saldana, Paul F. Tompkins, John Carroll Lynch, James Adomian, Eugene Cordero, Kulap Vilaysack & Jerrod Carmichael	August 9, 2013
Scott welcomes guests Zoe Saldana and legendary Hollywood director Garry Marshall (Paul F. Tompkins). Reggie and a police officer (John Carroll Lynch) switch places for the day.
16	6	"Gillian Jacobs Wears A Red Dress With Sail Boats"	Gillian Jacobs, Jason Mantzoukas, Michaela Watkins, Chris Hardwick, Adam Scott, Paul Rust & Neil Campbell	August 16, 2013
Scott welcomes guests Gillian Jacobs and vampire chef Emeril Lugosi (Jason Mantzoukas). Reggie's new girlfriend, Amber (Michaela Watkins) visits the studio and tries to murder him.
17	7	"Andy Richter Wears A Suit Jacket & A Baby Blue Button Down Shirt"	Andy Richter, Mike Hanford, Aidy Bryant, Jon Daly, Rob Huebel, Michael Ian Black, Jamie Denbo & Jessica Chaffin	August 23, 2013
Scott welcomes guests Andy Richter and political cartoonist Tom Perdy (Mike Hanford). The show's segment producer (Aidy Bryant) upstages Andy Richter in his interview; the devil (Jon Daly) steals Reggie's bike.
18	8	"Sarah Silverman Wears a Black Dress With A White Collar"	Sarah Silverman, Joe Lo Truglio, Adam DeVine & Mike Hanford	August 30, 2013
Scott welcomes guests Sarah Silverman and the world's fastest talking man, Stan Couples (Joe Lo Truglio). Nick the crew guy (Adam DeVine) causes trouble over his preference to using "Big Ladder" and demands that Scott destroy "Lil' Ladder"; Scott gets a make-over.
19	9	"Bill Hader Wears A Grey Button Down Shirt & Sneakers"	Bill Hader, Bobby Moynihan & Jimmy Pardo	September 6, 2013
Scott welcomes guests Bill Hader and young orphan boy Fourvel (Bobby Moynihan). Reggie joins the show via satellite while chasing storms; Scott has to share the studio with America's new favorite game show "Spin 2 Win!", which tapes at the exact same time.
20	10	"Casey Wilson Wears A White Lace Dress & A Black Blazer"	Casey Wilson, Paul F. Tompkins, Thomas Lennon, Laraine Newman & Andy Daly	September 13, 2013
Scott welcomes guests Casey Wilson and Sir Andrew Lloyd Webber (Paul F. Tompkins) for the special "musical extravaganza" mid-season finale, all written by Sir Lloyd Webber. The phantom of the Comedy Bang! Bang! studio (Thomas Lennon) kidnaps Casey Wilson to be a guest on his rival talk show.
21	11	"Rainn Wilson Wears a Short Sleeved Plaid Shirt & Colorful Sneakers"	Rainn Wilson, Andy Daly, Harry Anderson & John Ennis	October 18, 2013
Scott welcomes guests Rainn Wilson and cowboy poet Dalton Wilcox (Andy Daly). Scott holds a "New Friend Contest" and gives healthy eating tips; Reggie gains super-powers.
22	12	"Pee Wee Herman Wears a Halloween Costume"	Pee Wee Herman	October 25, 2013
Scott welcomes guest Pee Wee Herman for the Halloween episode.
23	13	"Jessica Alba Wears a Jacket with Patent Leather Pumps"	Jessica Alba, Kristen Schaal, Nat Faxon, Jim Rash, Tony Hale & Tig Notaro	November 1, 2013
Scott welcomes guests Jessica Alba and girlscout leader Gina Guppies (Kristen Schaal). Jessica Alba tries her hand at hosting a game show; Scott goes cross country to assist women with sweater problems.
24	14	"Rashida Jones Wears a Black Blazer & Flowered Pants"	Rashida Jones, Horatio Sanz, Dave Foley & Jack McBrayer	November 8, 2013
Scott welcomes guests Rashida Jones and monster truck driver Darryl Drummond (Horatio Sanz); Scott helps a scorned spouse get closure; Rashida Jones joins Scott and Reggie in a song and eats a bug; there's a bomb in the studio.
25	15	"Jim Gaffigan Wears a Blue Jacket & Plum T-Shirt"	Jim Gaffigan, Tim Kalpakis, Matt Walsh, Elizabeth Laime, Matt Besser, D'Arcy Carden & Howard Kremer	November 15, 2013
Scott welcomes guests Jim Gaffigan and shows a clip from Gaffigan's reality show. Inventor Lloyd Fleen (Tim Kalpakis) demonstrates a revolutionary new invention; Hooch the Mooch (Matt Besser) takes up residence on the couch and everyone's favorite novelty furniture is back: Billy Big Mouth Bass; Scott reports late for work and is delivered an ultimatum.
26	16	"Andy Dick Wears a Black Suit Jacket & Skinny Tie"	Andy Dick, Todd Glass, Matt Walsh, Bobcat Goldthwait, Kyle Kinane, Natasha Leggero, Brent Weinbach & DC Pierson	November 22, 2013
Scott welcomes guest Andy Dick and deals with the inherent problems in alternate realities. Plus Scott's mechanic (Todd Glass) reveals the best location for underground comedy.
27	17	"Clark Gregg Wears a Navy Blazer & White Collared Shirt"	Clark Gregg, Neil Campbell, Josh Homme, Andrew Rannells, Harris Wittels & Andy Kindler	November 29, 2013
Scott welcomes guests Clark Gregg and attorney Cody Gossman (Neil Campbell) makes his case for a national holiday for bad little boys and is confronted by his nemesis from the coalition for good little boys, Quinn Abernathy (Andrew Rannells); Scott offers a troubled celebrity a reality check; Reggie looks for love.
28	18	"Jason Schwartzman Wears a Striped Shirt and High Top Sneakers"	Jason Schwartzman, Paul Rust & The Sklar Brothers	December 6, 2013
Scott welcomes guest Jason Schwartzman and learns how to be a better father while Comedy Bang! Bang! participates in "Take Your Kid To Work Day"; Scott takes a chance on a basketball career and meets the world's worst boyfriend, Jack Blade (Paul Rust), who wants to date Scott's daughter.
29	19	"Cobie Smulders Wears a Black & White Strapless Dress"	Cobie Smulders, Zach Woods, Phil LaMarr, Topher Grace & Matthew Sweet	December 13, 2013
Scott welcomes guests Cobie Smulders and magician The Remarkable Greg (Zach Woods) for a special presentation of the "pilot episode" of Comedy Bang! Bang!
30	20	"Zach Galifianakis Wears a Santa Suit"	Zach Galifianakis, Dave Thomas, Lynne Marie Stewart & Aidy Bryant	December 20, 2013
Scott welcomes guests Santa Claus (Zach Galifianakis) and his parents, Mr. and Mrs. Aukerman (Dave Thomas and Lynne Marie Stewart) for the holiday themed season finale.

=== Season 3 (2014) ===
On October 14, 2013, the show was renewed for a 20-episode third season, which premiered on May 8, 2014.

No. overall	No. in season	Title	Guest(s)	Original release date	US viewers (millions)
31	1	"Patton Oswalt Wears a Black Blazer & Dress Shoes"	Patton Oswalt, Vanessa Bayer, Jerry Minor, Kevin Pollak, Kyle Massey, Lucas Till, Kirby Howell-Baptiste & Drew Droege	May 8, 2014	0.124
Scott welcomes guests Patton Oswalt and turtle expert Susan Armhold (Vanessa Bayer). Scott is arrested for accidentally opening Reggie's mail. Unsuspecting coffee shop customers are observed near an unprotected laptop computer and the people who attempt to steal it.
32	2	"Craig Robinson Wears a Bordeaux Button Down & Dark Jeans"	Craig Robinson, Bob Odenkirk, Tim Robinson, Kevin McDonald, Brian Stack & Catherine Reitman	May 15, 2014	0.207
Scott welcomes guests Craig Robinson and reunited comedy team Ofendorf & Sorbinstein (Bob Odenkirk and Tim Robinson). Reggie is sent into space to battle aliens; Scott helps a couple renovate their home.
33	3	"Jenna Fischer Wears a Floral Blouse & Black Heels"	Jenna Fischer, Paul Brittain, Taran Killam, Jason Alexander, Ron Lynch & Drew Droege	May 22, 2014	0.230
Scott welcomes guests Jenna Fischer and horse-fighting promoters The Calvins Twins (Paul Brittain and Taran Killam). The suspects of a murder that occurred in the studio are narrowed down; Jenna Fischer shows a clip from her appearance on the UK version of Comedy Bang! Bang!
34	4	"Fred Armisen Wears Black Jeans & Glasses"	Fred Armisen, Adam Pally, David Alan Grier, Aimee Mann, Mary Elizabeth Ellis, Stephanie Courtney, Jerry Minor & Fred Willard	May 29, 2014	0.152
Scott welcomes guests Fred Armisen and anti-drug spokesman Robert DeBiro (Adam Pally). Scott and Fred Armisen are in the running to take over a network late-night talk show.
35	5	"Zach Galifianakis Wears a One-Armed Jacket"	Zach Galifianakis, Lynne Marie Stewart, Dave Thomas, Paul F. Tompkins & Jenny Lewis	June 5, 2014	0.120
Scott welcomes guests Zach Galifianakis and his parents (Lynne Marie Stewart and Dave Thomas) for the "finale episode" of Comedy Bang! Bang!. Characters from past seasons stop by to say goodbye; and a surprise wedding.
36	6	"Nick Offerman Wears a Green Flannel Shirt & Brown Boots"	Nick Offerman, Kate McKinnon, Kyle Mooney, Michael Showalter, Richard Riehle, Maria Thayer & Robin Bartlett	June 12, 2014	0.169
Scott welcomes guests Nick Offerman and Effie Villalopolus (Kate McKinnon) gives tips on how to be a friendly neighbor. A hidden-camera segment involving Scott sending intern Monty (Kyle Mooney) to pose as a hot dog vendor is derailed when an earthquake occurs in the city; Scott gets in a fight with an umpire (Richard Riehle) during his "Ditch It or Pitch It" segment.
37	7	"Lizzy Caplan Wears All Black & Powder Blue Espadrilles"	Lizzy Caplan, Paul Scheer, Steve Little & "Weird Al" Yankovic	June 19, 2014	0.099
Scott welcomes guests Lizzy Caplan and celebrity photographer Jerry Donovan (Paul Scheer) in the special "clip show" episode where Scott and Reggie share their favorite moments from the show; Scott might be getting catfished when he meets a man (Steve Little) who claims to be Paul McCartney.
38	8	"Tony Hawk Wears a Plaid Shirt & Silver Watch"	Tony Hawk, Ben Schwartz & Matt Walsh	June 26, 2014	0.132
Scott welcomes guests Tony Hawk and celebrity publicist Rodney Wayber (Ben Schwartz). Scott gets a new boss when the producer's son Leland takes over the show; Tony Hawk gives crew members some advice; Scott hits the road in search of the world's best burger, while trying to solve his wife's murder.
39	9	"Alison Brie Wears a Black Mesh Top & Mini-Skirt"	Alison Brie, Paul F. Tompkins, James Adomian, Larry Miller, Craig Anton, Tim Meadows & Jerry Minor	July 3, 2014	0.169
Scott welcomes guests Alison Brie and German film director Werner Herzog (Paul F. Tompkins). Scott gets a lesson on running a show when "Talk Show Rescue" host Giles Duggard (James Adomian) barges into the studio; Reggie's favorite baseball team is profiled.
40	10	"Josh Groban Wears a Suit & Striped Socks"	Josh Groban, Josh Fadem & Neil Campbell	July 10, 2014	0.172
Scott welcomes guests Josh Groban and plate-spinning hypnotist Marty Sheesh (Josh Fadem) for the 1960s set mid-season finale; Reggie discovers that his dad had a chance at the big-time.
41	11	"Ellie Kemper Wears a Purple Ruffled Sleeveless Top & Lavender Flats"	Ellie Kemper, James Adomian & The National	October 17, 2014	0.076
Scott has a shot with his dream guest actress Ellie Kemper, but will he blow his chance to make a good impression? Jesse Ventura (James Adomian) has an important announcement and Scott fixes up a neglected school out of the kindness of his heart.
42	12	"Steven Yeun Wears Rolled Up Black Jeans & No Socks"	Steven Yeun, The Vandals, Matt Besser, Rhys Darby, Erinn Hayes & Horatio Sanz	October 24, 2014	0.059
The Walking Dead's Steven Yeun reveals how he'd prepare for a real zombie apocalypse. A community activist stops by to talk about his outreach programs. Plus, Scott finds out a documentarian has been filming Reggie's entire life.
43	13	"Wayne Coyne Wears a Halloween Costume"	Wayne Coyne, Tig Notaro & Baron Vaughn	October 31, 2014	0.092
In this special Halloween episode, musician Wayne Coyne of the Flaming Lips joins Scott on the couch where they are visited by the ghost of Scott's former career, a creepy couple and the Comedy Bang! Bang! accountant.
44	14	"Dane Cook Wears a Black Blazer & Tailored Pants"	Dane Cook, Jaime King, Ronnie Adrian, Nick Thune & Ben Blacker	November 7, 2014	0.068
Dane Cook sits on the couch next to the cast from one of the most critically acclaimed television series ever. Scott debuts a brand-new character and we see what Reggie is up to when he's not on Comedy Bang! Bang!
45	15	"Chris Hardwick Wears a Black Polo & Weathered Boots"	Chris Hardwick, Andy Daly, Future Islands, Lennon Parham & French Stewart	November 14, 2014	0.040
Chris Hardwick joins Scott and meets the new Comedy Bang! Bang! secretary who is working her way up the ranks. Reggie stars in a brand new commercial and there's a visit from the aspiring Honorary Mayor of Hollywood.
46	16	"Amber Tamblyn Wears a Leather Jacket & Black Booties"	Amber Tamblyn, Bobby Moynihan, Kevin Nealon, Whitney Cummings, Anthony Jeselnik & Jeff Ross	November 21, 2014	0.148
Amber Tamblyn drops by the set to celebrate Thanksgiving with the gang. Reggie invites some of his favorite comedians over for dinner but gets more from his guests then he bargained for.
47	17	"Kevin Smith Wears a Hockey Jersey & Jean Shorts"	Kevin Smith, Lauren Lapkus & Gil Ozeri	November 28, 2014	0.063
It's Scott's birthday and director Kevin Smith drops by to help him celebrate. Reggie tries to pull out all the stops to make it an episode Scott will never forget. Plus, a snooty college student gives a whole new meaning to ‘charity work.'
48	18	"Rob Corddry Wears Tan Dress Shoes & Red Socks"	Rob Corddry, Jon Daly & Jon Gabrus	December 5, 2014	0.082
Rob Corddry sits down with Scott as we say goodbye to one of the most adored cast members of Comedy Bang! Bang! A poet also drops by the studio to share his latest works.
49	19	"Eric André Wears a Cat Collage Shirt & Sneakers"	Eric André & "Weird Al" Yankovic	December 12, 2014	0.033
Can Scott pull off the perfect episode? Scott and Reggie take advantage of a scientist's new invention to do just that, going down a rabbit hole that could change everything.
50	20	"The Lonely Island Wear Holiday Sweaters & White Pants"	The Lonely Island, James Urbaniak, Alan Tudyk, Michael Blaiklock & Bruce McCulloch	December 19, 2014	0.112
When the hottest holiday toy is in short supply, people go to drastic measures. Luckily, The Lonely Island are here to get everyone in the Christmas spirit.

=== Season 4 (2015) ===
The show was renewed for a 40-episode fourth season which premiered on 9 January 2015.

No. overall	No. in season	Title	Guest(s)	Original release date	US viewers (millions)
51	1	"Ty Burrell Wears a Chambray Shirt and Clear Frame Glasses"	Ty Burrell, Nick Kroll, Jimmy Pardo, Creed Bratton, Fred Williamson, Jason Mantzoukas & Matt Besser	January 9, 2015	0.075
Ty Burrell shows Scott what the world looks like through his eyes; craft services coordinator Fabrice Fabrice (Nick Kroll) performs spoken word poetry.
52	2	"Maya Rudolph Wears a Black Skirt and Strappy Sandals"	Maya Rudolph, Maria Bamford, Oscar Nunez, Twin Shadow, David Alan Grier & Cameron Esposito	January 16, 2015	0.062
Maya Rudolph plays "Skirmish of the Sexes," and down on her luck businesswoman Claire Coulter (Maria Bamford) tries a new sales pitch. Also, Undercover Agent Aukerman has gone undercover to apprehend notorious bank robber, Reggie Watts.
53	3	"Schoolboy Q Wears a Patterned Bucket Hat and Glasses"	Schoolboy Q, Horatio Sanz, Chris Parnell, Jim Rash & Jack McBrayer	January 23, 2015	0.032
Rapper Schoolboy Q lets us know what it’s like to be "Man of the Year," and Aaron Neville (Horatio Sanz) explains his anti-violence campaign. Reggie is caught in a war between two musical groups vying for his attention.
54	4	"Eddie George Wears a Navy Suit and Half-Zip Pullover"	Eddie George, Craig Cackowski, Cedric Yarbrough, Brian Huskey & Kyle Bornheimer	January 30, 2015	0.079
After one too many pranks, Scott and Reggie are forced to switch show themes with the sports talk show hosts next door. Eddie George reveals the secret behind his greatest plays, and NFL Commissioner Wendell Gazell explains the changes he's making to the game.
55	5	"Simon Helberg Wears a Sky Blue Button Down and Jeans"	Simon Helberg, Matt L. Jones, Michael Lerner, Tom Lister, Jr., David Alan Grier, Jennette McCurdy & Paul Butcher	February 6, 2015	0.083
Simon Helberg has to prove he’s not an android. Scott and Reggie get whipped into shape by a cruel drill sergeant and are tasked with a dangerous mission of their own.
56	6	"Mark Duplass Wears a Striped Sweater and Jeans"	Mark Duplass, Jessica St. Clair, Eddie Pepitone, Jack Antonoff, Howard Kremer, Zandy Hartig, David Anthony Higgins & Maria Thayer	February 13, 2015	0.073
In this Valentine’s Day Special, Scott must help Reggie land the girl of his dreams. Scott has a shoot-out with guest Mark Duplass, and etiquette expert Miss Polite dispenses advice.
57	7	"Kid Cudi Wears a Denim Shirt and Red Sneakers"	Kid Cudi, Noël Wells, Jonah Ray, Angela Trimbur, Todd Barry & Henry Winkler	February 20, 2015	0.026
Rapper Kid Cudi drops by to give Scott a lesson in the art of the prank phone call, and 6-year-old film critic Aiden Tomasetto shares his favorite movies.
58	8	"Jesse Tyler Ferguson Wears a Brown Checked Shirt and Stripey Socks"	Jesse Tyler Ferguson, Seth Morris, George Wendt, Beth Dover & Jeremy Mann	February 27, 2015	0.082
Jesse Tyler Ferguson explains the great chemistry behind Modern Family, and cyborg rights activist Nelz Hebber has some ideas for the future. Meanwhile, Scott tries to balance his family life with his career as a talk show host.
59	9	"Dax Shepard Wears a Heather Gray Shirt and Black Blazer"	Dax Shepard, Kevin Allison, Natasha Lyonne, Kulap Vilaysack, David Alan Grier, Baron Vaughn & Paul Dooley	March 6, 2015	0.050
Dax Shepard demonstrates the difference between comedic and dramatic acting, and professional gift guesser Bertram Jollymore shows off his talents on the couch. Meanwhile, to deal with rising rent costs, Scott and Reggie find a new roommate.
60	10	"Zach Galifianakis Wears Grey Corduroys and Brown Leather Shoes"	Zach Galifianakis, Tears for Fears, Chris Hardwick, Mike Hanford, Jessica Jean Jardine, Randy Liedtke & Brent Spiner	March 13, 2015	0.044
The cast and crew are very sleepy; Zach Galifianakis takes a nap on the couch; Reggie has a dream of making music with Tears for Fears; Scott tries to keep everyone awake.
61	11	"Joseph Gordon-Levitt Wears a Heart T-Shirt and Blue Jeans"	Joseph Gordon-Levitt, Jon Gabrus, Jocelyn DeBoer, Christine Woods & Allison Tolman	April 3, 2015	0.029
Scott realizes his true feelings for his producer; Joseph Gordon-Levitt gives Reggie a reason to join his collaborative production company; shock jock Ronnie "Brew Dude'' Haynes gives the true definition of Taco Tuesday.
62	12	"Jack Black Wears an Embroidered Cowboy Shirt and Ox Blood Sneakers"	Jack Black, Paul F. Tompkins, Daniel Cudmore & Adam Scott	April 10, 2015	0.040
Scott and Reggie work on spending their stunt budget which leads to an amazing show; Jack Black tries to decide what song to perform; vigilante J.W. Stillwater discusses fan boats, alligators and justice.
63	13	"Joel McHale Wears a Navy Zip-up and High Tops"	Joel McHale, James Adomian, Val Chmerkovskiy, Reza Farahan, Ozzy Lusth & Neil Campbell	April 17, 2015	0.049
Joel McHale talks about his unusual birth and a Hollywood actor dishes on his recent firing. Meanwhile, the show is being run by Scott's new machine, the Comedy Touch Touch 1000. Will a warning from the future be enough to help Scott save the show, or will machines take over forever?
64	14	"Lil Jon Wears a Baseball Cap and Sunglasses"	Lil Jon, Claudia O'Doherty, Vince Gilligan, Tom Green & Stephanie Allynne	April 24, 2015	0.082
Rapper Lil Jon discusses his retirement plans; spokesperson Shandy Williams gives Scott a gift from her new hair extension line; the Quizzler is running loose in the studio and it's up to Scott and Reggie to solve his quizzles.
65	15	"Colin Hanks Wears a Denim Button Down and Black Sneakers"	Colin Hanks, Chelsea Peretti, Sinbad, Ingrid Haas, Baron Vaughn, Mike Hanford & Jefferson Dutton	May 1, 2015	0.039
A physicist takes Scott, Reggie, and the crew aboard his spaceship, but danger soon arises; Scott wants to be able to interview Colin Hanks and celebrity stylist Trey Booth but the perils of space may get to them first.
66	16	"Skylar Astin Wears Blue Jeans and Weathered Brown Desert Boots"	Skylar Astin, Lennon Parham, David Alan Grier, Hayley Marie Norman, Myq Kaplan, Marc Evan Jackson & Rich Sommer	May 8, 2015	0.014
Scott is in danger of losing his job if he can't pass his big test, so he enlists a tutor for help. Meanwhile, Skylar Astin reveals his real age and Easy Listening DJ Forsythia reads dedications from her listeners.
67	17	"Michael Sheen Wears a Plaid Button Down and Grey Blazer"	Michael Sheen, Brendon Small, Maynard Keenan, Rich Fulcher, Tim Kalpakis & Armen Weitzman	May 15, 2015	0.064
Michael Sheen teaches Scott about the birds and the bees, and entertainer Victor Diamond explains his various medical conditions. Meanwhile, Scott receives accolades for saving Wonky Cat, the world's weirdest cat.
68	18	"Thomas Middleditch Wears an Enigmatic Sweatshirt and Sweatpants With Pockets"	Thomas Middleditch, Lauren Lapkus, Aisha Dee, Kelly Marie Tran, Janie Haddad Tompkins & Andrew Friedman	May 22, 2015	0.032
Scott's secret identity is at risk when his friends win the Comedy Bang! Bang! "Interview a Fan" contest. Meanwhile, Thomas Middleditch proves he's an expert at accent work, and shaman Harmony Moonglass leads the group in a guided mediation.
69	19	"Karen Gillan Wears A Black and White Striped Pullover and Coral Skirt"	Karen Gillan, John Gemberling, Bob Einstein, Jesse Thorn, Mark Saul, Jerry Minor & Blake Anderson	May 28, 2015	0.057
Karen Gillan spills movie secrets, and small business owner George Groiny Melendez reveals his less than savory profession. Meanwhile, Scott is torn between his new writers and the comedy of yesteryear.
70	20	"Judd Apatow Wears A Polo and Blue Suede Shoes"	Judd Apatow, Jacob Pitts & Christopher Stanley	June 4, 2015	0.029
Scott receives a visit from a reporter writing about the fate of Reggie Watts. Scott remembers their last episode together, with guest Judd Apatow and a special appearance from Scott's daughters.
71	21	"Michael Cera Wears a Yellow Collared Shirt and White Sneakers"	Michael Cera, Andy Daly & Matt Walsh	July 9, 2015	0.028
When Scott is assigned Kid Cudi as his new partner, the two of them must settle their differences and learn to work together. Michael Cera shows off his business cards and German pretzel maker August Lindt shares his odd recommendations for vacation destinations.
72	22	"James Marsden Wears Gray Pants and Black High-Top Sneakers"	James Marsden, Brett Gelman, Chris Parnell, Rob Zabrecky, Shadie Elnashai, Brett Loudermilk & John Lovick	July 16, 2015	0.052
When a wizard appears on-set, Scott agrees to help save his realm if they can perform in a magic show together. James Marsden acts with a real rabbit and discusses his good looks, and Mr. Celebrity shares Hollywood gossip. Scott and Cudi preview their new zombie movie.
73	23	"Brie Larson Wears a Billowy Long-Sleeve Shirt and White Saddle Shoes"	Brie Larson, Bobby Moynihan, Zoe Jarman, Tyler James Williams, Kiersey Clemons, Ify Nwadiwe, Jordan Christian Hearn & Chandra Lee Schwartz	July 23, 2015	0.059
The Comedy Bang! Bang! crew takes off for summer vacation, leaving Scott and Kid Cudi to finish the season with a ragtag crew of misfits. Meanwhile, Brie Larson plays "What’s In Her Bag?" and orphan boy Fourvel (Bobby Moynihan) gives tips to stay out of the summer heat.
74	24	"Carly Rae Jepsen Wears a Chunky Necklace and Black Ankle Boots"	Carly Rae Jepsen, Paul Scheer, Baron Vaughn, David Neher, Saudia Rashed, Andy Kindler, Tom Rhodes, Erica Rhodes & Rick Overton	July 30, 2015	0.030
Scott fires security guard Zeke and hires someone new to protect the show's belongings. Carly Rae Jepsen premieres a new song, and amusement park owner Tim Duncan explains his scariest ride, the "Samurai Scream."
75	25	"Mary Elizabeth Winstead Wears an A-Line Skirt and Pointy Black Boots"	Mary Elizabeth Winstead, Horatio Sanz, Steve Agee, Aaron Takahashi, Pamela Murphy, Evan Kishiyama, Jonathan Tysor, Tom Gammill & Howard Kremer	August 6, 2015	0.037
Scott and Kid Cudi try to catch a rat in the studio before their annual health inspection. Meanwhile, Mary Elizabeth Winstead celebrates her birthday, and inventor Ahmad Rashad al-Zarqawi shows us his new gadget.
76	26	"Tom Lennon Wears Black Slacks and a Black Skinny Tie"	Thomas Lennon, Paul F. Tompkins, Johnny Meeks, Dave Ferguson & Betsy Sodaro	August 13, 2015	0.050
After Scott’s editors threaten to go on strike, Scott decides to do the show all in one take—no editing needed. Meanwhile, Tom Lennon shows how messy he can get and a famous Broadway director shares songs from his classic show.
77	27	"Ken Marino Wears a Slim Gray Suit and Salmon Tie"	Ken Marino, Matt Besser, Nathan Barnatt, Kevin Pollak & Bob Odenkirk	August 20, 2015	0.070
After a last-minute guest drop-out, Scott signs a deal with the devil to get dream guest Ken Marino on the couch. Meanwhile, a famous Icelandic singer stops in to sing her country's new national anthem. Will Lou Ceepher take Scott’s soul to Hell forever, or can Scott wish his way out of this devilish predicament?
78	28	"Randall Park Wears Brown Dress Shoes With Blue Socks"	Randall Park, Paul Brittain, Neil Campbell, Haley Joel Osment, Jefferson Dutton, Mary Holland, Matt Gourley & Janie Haddad Tompkins	August 27, 2015	0.070
Scott wants to wear an unconventional hat to accept his Lifetime Achievement Award, and the staff doesn’t have the heart to argue. Meanwhile, Randall Park plays "Title These Tunes" and Richard Bunn shows how he has written 140 novels with his "Bunn Process."
79	29	"A$AP Rocky Wears a Black Button Up Jacket and Black Sneakers"	A$AP Rocky, Kyle Bornheimer, Cedric Yarbrough, Hannah Kasulka, Joe Saunders, Caroline Anderson & Neil Campbell	September 3, 2015	0.044
Scott’s personal possessions come to life and go on an epic adventure to reunite with him. Meanwhile, A$AP Rocky visits and shows off his awards, and Scott debuts the trailer to his new sports movie.
80	30	""Weird Al" Yankovic Wears a Different Hawaiian Shirt"	"Weird Al" Yankovic, Cheri Oteri, Heather Morris, Nicole Byer, Joe Nunez, Eugene Cordero & Colton Dunn	September 10, 2015	0.039
Comedy Bang! Bang! tries to appeal to a female audience by hiring three co-hosts, but Cudi suspects something's not right. Weird Al plays a game of "Celebrity Weird Al Do's" while Cudi enlists the help of paranormal professionals.
81	31	"Uzo Aduba Wears a White Blouse and Royal Blue Heels"	Uzo Aduba, Thomas Middleditch, John Hodgman, James Adomian, Cleopatra Coleman & Ryan Stanger	October 8, 2015	0.018
Uzo Aduba's comic skills are on display; concerned citizen Tim Landers describes his plan to get back at some kids; Scott and Cudi from the future take a time machine back to the present to prevent the total destruction of comedy.
82	32	"Judy Greer Wears a Navy Blouse and Strappy Sandals"	Judy Greer, Ben Schwartz, Kym Whitley, Jon Dore, Cedric Yarbrough, Kyle Bornheimer, Mike Hanford, Neil Campbell & Lauren McGuire	October 15, 2015	0.017
Judy Greer presents her universal audition and the gang awaits an appearance by Tom Hanks. Kid Cudi is revealed to be a former hockey star, and his rival comes to the studio to challenge him to a rematch.
83	33	"Stephen Merchant Wears a Checkered Shirt and Rolled Up Jeans"	Stephen Merchant, Rob Huebel, Lynne Marie Stewart, Dave Thomas, Michael McKean, Sally Kellerman & Jimmy Pardo	October 22, 2015	0.011
Stephen Merchant talks about his rock collection, and martial artist Dave Grigsby demonstrates his karate skills. Scott finds out something shocking about his parentage and must go through a series of challenges.
84	34	"Robert Kirkman Wears a Tan Blazer and Red Suit Pants"	Robert Kirkman, Matt Gourley, Dave Ferguson, Megan Heyn, Michael Cassady, Kathryn Burns, Rachel Collins & Matt Walsh	October 29, 2015	0.025
Robert Kirkman discusses his greatest fears. Scott and his crew get spooky for Halloween as the Comedy Bang! Bang! set turns into a haunted house visited by some stranded strangers.
85	35	"David Krumholtz Wears a Blue Zip-Up Jacket and Grey Sneakers"	David Krumholtz, Joe Wengert, Andy Dick, Dave Anthony & Brendon Walsh	November 5, 2015	0.054
David Krumholtz reviews Scott's hosting skills, and Arthur Steinborn teaches the gang his memory technique. Scott and Cudi are visited by an avant-garde painter who wants to give the show a more artistic spin.
86	36	"Michelle Monaghan Wears a Burnt Orange Dress and White Heels"	Michelle Monaghan, Paul F. Tompkins, Nick Swardson & Brent Weinbach	November 12, 2015	0.042
Michelle Monaghan shows off her hog-wrestling skills, while Alan Thicke performs personalized theme songs for everyone. When Scott suddenly gets rich, he's visited by his long-lost brother Billy.
87	37	"Jake Johnson Wears a Light Blue Button-Up Shirt and Brown Shoes"	Jake Johnson, Haley Joel Osment, Holly Prazoff, Maria Thayer, Tim Kalpakis & Nick Wiger	November 19, 2015	0.031
Jake Johnson shares some dating advice and Scott presents his new game show. The studio is flipped upside down, and the gang must do the show hanging from the ceiling.
88	38	"Adam Pally Wears a Navy Blazer and Bright Blue Sneakers"	Adam Pally, Luka Jones, John Roberts, Allan McLeod, Erin Whitehead, Neil Campbell, Phoebe Neidhardt & Fran Gillespie	December 3, 2015	0.017
Adam Pally discusses his holiday plans, and Scott premieres his new dating show. Kid Cudi introduces his newest character, who becomes an instant celebrity.
89	39	"Kathryn Hahn Wears Ripped Jeans and Black Heels"	Kathryn Hahn, Mike Hanford, Haley Joel Osment, Reggie Watts, Mike Mitchell & Alex Fernie	December 3, 2015	0.050
Kathryn Hahn arrives and swears like a sailor. John Lennon comes back from the dead and Scott teaches the skills needed to host a talk show.
90	40	"Josh Groban Wears a Blue Blazer and Shiny Black Shoes"	Josh Groban, Katheryne Penny & Mike McLendon	December 10, 2015	0.036
It's Christmas, but global warming has turned the Comedy Bang! Bang! set into a beach. Josh Groban shows off his singing skills, and Scott falls in love.

=== Season 5 (2016) ===
On May 5, 2015, the series was renewed for a 20-episode fifth season, which premiered on June 3, 2016.

No. overall	No. in season	Title	Guest(s)	Original release date	US viewers (millions)
91	1	"Kevin Bacon Wears a Blue Button Down Shirt and Brown Boots"	Kevin Bacon, Ben Schwartz, John Milhiser, Baron Vaughn, Haley Joel Osment, Matt Walsh, Kenny Stevenson & Jacob Wysocki	June 3, 2016	0.050
"Weird Al" Yankovic joins the Comedy Bang! Bang! team, while Kevin Bacon talks about city planning. When Scott finds a pot of gold, he's harassed by a mythical creature.
92	2	"The Lonely Island Wear Dark Pants and Eyeglasses"	The Lonely Island, Nick Kroll, John Mulaney, Leanne Agmon, Jeremy Mann & Shelby Fero	June 3, 2016	0.040
The Lonely Island present their new merchandise, while Gil Faizon and George St. Geegland discuss their upcoming Broadway show.
93	3	"Tony Hale Wears a Blue Flannel Shirt and Fuchsia Sneakers"	Tony Hale, Lauren Lapkus, Faith Jenkins, Chris Wood, Haley Joel Osment, Jon Polito, Eddie Pepitone & Aaron Stanford	June 10, 2016	0.040
Tony Hale throws out the first Comedy Bang! Bang! pitch. Scott forgets the meaning of friendship when he decides to play mean pranks on his crew. Plus, a preview for Scott's new game show You Made Your Bed, Now Lie In It.
94	4	"Tegan and Sara Wear Leather Jackets and Skinny Jeans"	Tegan and Sara, Bobby Moynihan, Michael Blaiklock, Ray Wise, The Lonely Island, Carl Tart, Michael Cassady & Charlie Sanders	June 10, 2016	0.027
Tegan and Sara stop by to dish on their songwriting process, while Scott notices there's something off about the new intern Raymond. Meanwhile, an unexpected visitor gives the home audience acting tips.
95	5	"T-Pain Wears Shredded Jeans and a Printed Shirt"	T-Pain, Horatio Sanz, Heather Anne Campbell, Mike Mitchell & Chris Tallman	June 17, 2016	0.035
T-Pain, Scott and "Weird Al" write a new song, and Melvin Alberts discusses his alien abduction. Scott makes a scientific breakthrough.
96	6	"Aubrey Plaza Wears a Velvet Off-the-Shoulder Gown With Flowers in Her Hair"	Aubrey Plaza, Nate Corddry, Dave Foley, Fred Willard, Marcy Jarreau & Candace Brown	June 17, 2016	0.031
Aubrey Plaza flirts with Scott, while "Weird Al" and Scott are transported to a different time period by a mysterious stranger.
97	7	"Joe Jonas Wears a Maroon and Gold Letterman Jacket With White Sneakers"	Joe Jonas, Neil Campbell, McG, Emily Bett Rickards, Wendy McColm, Londale Theus, Jr., Mike Hanford, Janie Haddad Tompkins & Steve-O	June 24, 2016	0.062
Joe Jonas shows off his odd replacement for a cell phone, while Scott hosts a memorial for his old friend. Maxwell Keeper talks about where he works, and we get a sneak peek of Scott's new movie.
98	8	"Nathan Fielder Wears a Blue and Grey Flannel and Jeans"	Nathan Fielder, Mike O'Brien, Dave Gruber Allen, Matt Besser, Suzi Barrett, Beth Appel, Janie Haddad Tompkins, Mike Hanford & Mike Mitchell	June 24, 2016	0.065
Scott and "Weird Al" try their best to freak out Nathan Fielder. Meanwhile, ice cream makers Len & Barry ask Scott to help them come up with a Comedy Bang! Bang! flavor.
99	9	"Kristen Schaal Wears Strawberry Colored Pants and a Multicolored Shirt"	Kristen Schaal, Paul Rust, Amy Hill, Jennifer Gareis, Matt Walsh, Tim Kalpakis & Jee Young Han	July 1, 2016	0.096
Kristen Schaal uses her real voice; Paul Rust presents his New No-Nos. It's time for "Weird Al" Yankovic's birthday, but one member of his family isn't very happy about it.
100	10	"Zach Galifianakis Wears Rolled Khakis and Shoes With Brown Laces"	Zach Galifianakis, Paul F. Tompkins, Abigail Spencer, Howard Kremer, Maria Thayer, Haley Joel Osment, Tawny Newsome, Mike Hanford & Baron Vaughn	July 1, 2016	0.068
After Scott hits his head and loses his memory, Zach Galifianakis, "Weird Al" and the Comedy Bang! Bang! crew reflect on their favorite moments with Scott.
101	11	"Kaley Cuoco Wears a Black Blazer and Slip on Sneakers"	Kaley Cuoco, Kate Berlant, David Anders, Jay R. Ferguson, Paul Gilmartin, Howard Kremer, Heather Lawless, Samm Levine, Janet Varney, Aaron Stanford, Alan Yang & Dan Ahdoot	October 28, 2016	0.057
The Comedy Bang! Bang! team is visited by some American heroes trying to bring the country back to its moral foundations. Kaley Cuoco drops by and settles her will, and lifestyle coach Karen helps Scott style his inside.
102	12	"Gillian Jacobs Wears a Gray Checkered Suit and a Red Bow Tie"	Gillian Jacobs, James Adomian, Betsy Sodaro, Marc Evan Jackson, Rosa Salazar, Tim Kalpakis & Mitch Silpa	October 28, 2016	0.040
The Comedy Bang! Bang! studio gets ready for a calm Halloween, but Scott and the crew are unaware that they are being haunted by a ghoulish spirit. Gillian Jacobs comes by and gets a free cocktail, and Scott presents his latest horror film role.
103	13	"Scott Aukerman Wears a Tailored Black Suit"	Jason Mantzoukas, Drew Tarver, Haley Joel Osment, Londale Theus, Jr., Santina Muha & Mary Sohn	November 4, 2016	0.144
When Scott leaves the show for a new opportunity, Jason Mantzoukas takes over as special substitute host. His first guest? Celebrity Scott Aukerman. Also, legendary soul singer Donny Gary stops by the couch.
104	14	"Krysten Ritter Wears a Turtleneck and Black Boots"	Krysten Ritter, Mary Holland, Baron Vaughn, Chris Redd, Mandell Maughan, Carl Tart, Mike Hanford, Jen D'Angelo & Hannah Garcés	November 4, 2016	0.094
Scott and "Weird Al" throw a party that goes a little overboard. Krysten Ritter visits and plays her favorite party game, and author Gail Summercat gives tips to women in the workplace.
105	15	"Allison Janney Wears a Chambray Western Shirt and Suede Fringe Boots"	Allison Janney, Jessica McKenna, Ray Wise, Sarah Baker, Sean Clements, Janie Haddad Tompkins, Mike Hanford, Mike Mitchell & Jessica Jean Jardine	November 11, 2016	0.085
"Weird Al" and the gang cope with the death of a friend, and Allison Janney visits the Comedy Bang! Bang! set to chat and play a game.
106	16	"Ben Folds Wears a Black Button Down and Jeans"	Ben Folds, Tim Baltz, Alison Rich, Ryan Gaul, Wayne Federman, Lynne Marie Stewart, Will Hines, Carl Tart, Dan Klein, Howard Kremer, Mike Hanford & Mike Mitchell	November 11, 2016	0.044
Scott's estranged family visits, and Ben Folds stops by to talk about his new business. Plus, "Weird Al" Yankovic premieres his new sports documentary, and world traveler Martin Moreland drops by the couch.
107	17	"Malin Akerman Wears a Black Blouse and Cropped Jeans"	Malin Åkerman, Haley Joel Osment, Laraine Newman, Chris Parnell, Bil Dwyer, Regan Burns, Ingrid Haas, Ronnie Adrian, Ashleigh Crystal Hairston, Emily Durrett, Tim Casto & Bryan Safi	November 18, 2016	0.104
Malin Akerman stops by the Comedy Bang! Bang! set and reveals all her deep dark secrets. Meanwhile, Slow Joey tries to juggle his new business venture with falling in love.
108	18	"Mike Colter Wears a Pink Button Up and Black Boots"	Mike Colter, Andy Daly, Bruce McCulloch, Mary Elizabeth Ellis, Hayley Marie Norman, Emily Chang & Haley Joel Osment	November 18, 2016	0.073
Scott is excited to celebrate Thanksgiving with the Comedy Bang! Bang! crew, but will a group of outsiders disrupt his plans? Also, Mike Colter discloses a shocking revelation, and teacher Joe Bongo talks about his extracurricular activities.
109	19	"Reggie Watts Wears a Purple and Yellow Quilted Sweatshirt"	Reggie Watts, Adam Scott, Tim Heidecker, Jerry Minor, Neil Campbell, Mike Hanford, Janie Haddad Tompkins, Paul F. Tompkins & Matt Walsh	December 2, 2016	0.076
Reggie Watts returns to the show just in time to try to prevent a disaster from striking. Meanwhile, Al has a surprising announcement, and Adam Scott drops by to give Scott some assistance.
110	20	"Lord Andrew Lloyd Webber Wears a Purple Top Hat & Fabrice Fabrice Wears One Pink Fur Leg Warmer"	Paul F. Tompkins, Nick Kroll, Bob Odenkirk, Haley Joel Osment, Kulap Vilaysack, Neil Campbell, Janie Haddad Tompkins, Reggie Watts, Baron Vaughn, Howard Kremer, Mike Mitchell, Matt Walsh, Mike Hanford, Ingrid Haas, Jessica Jean Jardine, Grant Palmer & Lynne Marie Stewart	December 2, 2016	0.066
Scott receives some disturbing news that might mean the end of Comedy Bang! Bang! forever. But before the end, old friends Lord Andrew Lloyd Webber and Fabrice Fabrice drop by to say goodbye to the gang.
