= Ali Farahnakian =

American actor and comedian (born 1969)

Ali Reza Farahnakian (born October 26, 1969) is an American actor, writer, and improvisational comedian. He is the founder of The Peoples Improv Theater (The PIT) in NYC and co-starred in the Adult Swim comedy series Delocated. He has been married to Beth Saunders since September 2004.

== Life and career ==
Farahnakian was born in Tehran, Iran but grew up in North Carolina and graduated from the University of North Carolina in 1990. After college he moved to Chicago in 1990. While in Chicago he became involved in improvisational comedy and was a performer at Chicago's Second City, ImprovOlympic and was one of the original founding members of the Upright Citizens Brigade (UCB) along with other original UCB members such as Matt Besser, Amy Poehler, Ian Roberts, Rick Roman, Horatio Sanz, and Adam McKay. In 2002, he founded The Peoples Improv Theater (The PIT) in New York City in honor of his mentor Del Close. In 2001, his one-man show "Word of Mouth" was featured at the U.S. Comedy Arts Festival.

Farahnakian wrote for Saturday Night Live in the 1999–2000 season and appeared for many years as a sketch performer on Late Night with Conan O'Brien, his memorable characters on the show included playing Conan's agent Ari Palone.

Farahnakian has appeared in films such as Edge of Darkness, The Bourne Legacy and Arthur. He has made guest appearances on television programs such as Law & Order: Special Victims Unit, 30 Rock, and Louie. In 2012, Farahnakian joined the cast for the third season of the Adult Swim show Delocated starring Jon Glaser. Farahnakian played the role of "TB the Federal Agent", Jon's bodyguard.

Farahnakian has also written for the MTV sketch series Human Giant and produced segments for the Channel 101 website.
