= Players (2010 TV series) =

American sitcom

- Genre: Sitcom
- Created by: Matt Walsh
- Starring: Matt Walsh; Ian Roberts; June Diane Raphael; Danielle Schneider; James Pumphrey; Jack McGee
- Country of origin: United States
- No. of seasons: 1
- No. of episodes: 10

Production
- Running time: approx. 22 minutes

Original release
- Network: Spike
- Release: March 2 – August 14, 2010

Players is an American sitcom which premiered on the Spike network on March 2, 2010. The series is a partially scripted/mostly improvised comedy about two brothers who run a sports bar together. After airing three episodes, Players was removed from the Spike schedule and put on hiatus. The remaining seven episodes from season 1 were pushed back to air beginning July 21, 2010. Spike aired the final four episodes back-to-back on August 14, 2010.

== Premise ==
Creator Matt Walsh stars as fun-loving Bruce who runs a sports bar with his uptight older brother Ken, played by Ian Roberts. June Diane Raphael and Danielle Schneider co-star as Barb and Krista, the bar's waitresses. The cast also features James Pumphrey as Calvin, the young bartender who lives in the storage room and Jack McGee as Hickey, a retired police officer who spends most of his time hanging out at the bar betting on games.

Guests stars included Matt Besser, Rob Huebel, Ken Jeong, Andrew Daly, Cathy Shim, Joe Nunez, Paul Scheer and Horatio Sanz.

== Cast ==
- Matt Walsh as Bruce Fitzgerald
- Ian Roberts as Ken Fitzgerald
- June Diane Raphael as Barb Tolan
- Danielle Schneider as Krista DiMarco
- James Pumphrey as Calvin Trout
- Jack McGee as Hickey

== Episodes ==
No.	Title	Original release date
1	"Krista's Mom"	March 2, 2010
When her hard-to-please mom (Caroline Aaron) comes for a visit, Krista lies to her mother about being the manager of the bar. Later on, in a moment of panic, she lies again about being engaged to Ken.
2	"Grand Re-Opening"	March 8, 2010
While Bruce is planning a grand re-opening, Ken's repeated attempts to prove that he's capable of having fun backfire when he injures a customer at the big event who threatens to sue and shut down the bar for good.
3	"Barb's Husband"	March 16, 2010
Bruce is nonchalant about Barb still living with her husband (Rob Huebel) who she's separated from, she gets upset and breaks up with him, ultimately forcing Bruce to fake a jealous rage and win her back.
4	"The Intervention"	July 21, 2010
After Ken becomes concerned with Bruce's gambling, he stages an intervention for Bruce which nobody else takes seriously.
5	"Cumdog Millionaire"	July 31, 2010
Bruce leases Players out for a film shoot that turns out to be a hardcore porno. Ken is furious when he finds out, but quickly changes his tone after being asked by the director (Horatio Sanz) to play the part of an authentic restaurant manager.
6	"Cousin Leonard"	August 7, 2010
Bruce and Ken's mentally challenged cousin Leonard (also played by Ian Roberts) comes to Players for a visit. Barb grows attached to a missing child.
7	"Induction Day"	August 14, 2010
While Hickey deals with the heartbreak of his favorite ballplayer Pete Rose's continued ineligibility for baseball's hall of fame, the rest of the gang prepares for a visit from a local food critic (Ken Jeong).
8	"World Cup"	August 14, 2010
When Players becomes a haven for European soccer fans, who flock there to watch World Cup qualifying matches, Bruce and Ken come to blows over their alliances to the fans of England and Germany respectively
9	"Teardrop Angels"	August 14, 2010
Convinced that Ken will never stop pining for his ex-wife until he sleeps with someone else, Bruce puts up a $2,762e92 bounty to the first Players staff member to get Ken laid.
10	"Mr. Meat Snak Stix"	August 14, 2010
Bruce holds a promotional event at Players for a brand new snack product that ends up being meat-flavored crack which turns everyone in the bar into hopped up, violent drug addicts.
