= Freak Dance (film) =

2011 film by Matt Besser

- Directed by: Matt Besser; Neil Mahoney
- Written by: Matt Besser
- Produced by: George Whitman; Inman Young
- Starring: Michael Daniel Cassady; Megan Heyn; Amy Poehler; Matt Besser; Ian Roberts; Matt Walsh
- Cinematography: Evin Grant; David Thies
- Edited by: Neil Mahoney
- Music by: Michael Daniel Cassady
- Distributed by: Image Entertainment; UCB Comedy
- Release date: October 21, 2011
- Running time: 97 minutes
- Country: United States
- Language: English

Freak Dance is an American comedy film written and directed by Matt Besser of the Upright Citizens Brigade and co-directed by Neil Mahoney. It premiered at the Austin Film Festival on October 21, 2011. The film had a limited theatrical release in May 2012 and was made available on video on demand services. The film was released on DVD on July 10, 2012. The film is based on a stage show created by Besser and directed by Lindsay Hendrickson Lefler, which originally ran at the Upright Citizens Brigade Theater in Los Angeles for several years.

== Plot ==
Freak Dance is a musical, dance comedy where rich girl Cocolonia (Megan Heyn) must escape her uptight mother (Amy Poehler) who won't let her dance. So Cocolonia hits the streets to join a dance crew that responds to every challenge with a dance. With the help of dance crew leader Funky Bunch (Michael Daniel Cassady), who dreams of being the world's greatest dancer. The crew must save the Fantaseez Community Center from the evil "Building Inspector General" (Matt Besser) and the gang-banger dancers before it's too late. Will the Fantaseez Crew be able to save their home? Only love, and the Freak Dance can save them now.

== Cast ==
- Michael Daniel Cassady as Funky Bunch
- Megan Heyn as Cocolonia
- Amy Poehler as Lillian
- Matt Besser as The Building Inspector General
- Ian Roberts as Dr. Starvos
- Matt Walsh as Adolf Hitler, Jr.
- Angela Trimbur as Sassy
- Sam Riegel as Barrio
- Drew Droege as Dazzle
- Hal Rudnick as Asteroid
- Benjamin Siemon as Egghead
- Allen McLeod as Lint
- Scott Rodgers as Spit
- Tim Meadows as Irish Cop
- Horatio Sanz as Barrio's Brother
- Casey Wilson as Rich Lady
- Danielle Schneider as Desk Nurse
- Paul Rust as Weed Fiend
- Andrew Daly as Gentleman Weed Fiend
- James Adomian as Mickey Stardust, Zip Fleestreet, & Fraggle McWinkerbean
- Charlie Sanders as Slaughterhouse Employee
