= Matt Walsh (comedian) =

American comedian and actor (born 1964)

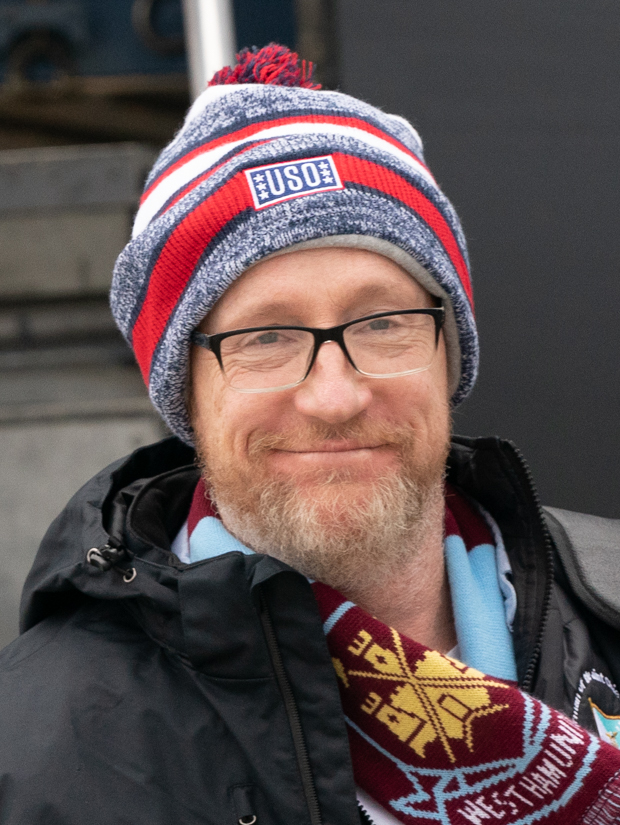
- Walsh in 2020
- Born: Matthew Paul Walsh; October 13, 1964 (age 62); Chicago, Illinois, U.S.
- Education: Northern Illinois University
- Spouse: Morgan Walsh

Comedy career
- Years active: 1991–present
- Medium: Stand-up; film; television
- Genre: Improvisational comedy

Matthew Paul Walsh (born October 13, 1964) is an American comedian and actor. He is best known for his role as Mike McLintock in Veep for which he received two Primetime Emmy Award nominations. He is a founding member of the Upright Citizens Brigade sketch comedy troupe, with which he co-starred in its original television series and the 2015 reboot. He also previously starred in short-lived comedy programs such as Dog Bites Man and Players, and was a correspondent on The Daily Show with Jon Stewart. He has also appeared in films such as Road Trip (2000), Bad Santa (2003), School for Scoundrels (2006), Role Models (2008), The Hangover (2009), Into the Storm (2014), and The Do-Over (2016).

== Early life ==
Walsh was born in Chicago, the fourth of seven children of Dick and Audrey Walsh. He graduated from Hinsdale South High School in 1982. While in high school he played on the football team as a backup tight end. He attended Northern Illinois University, where he graduated with a degree in Psychology, also spending a year studying abroad in Austria at Salzburg College.

== Career ==
After college, Walsh took improvisational comedy classes in Chicago, where he became a regular performer at the Annoyance Theater and ImprovOlympic, and studied under Del Close. In 1991, he met comedian Matt Besser, with whom he began performing stand-up comedy. Along with Matt Besser, Amy Poehler, and Ian Roberts, he is a founding member of the Upright Citizens Brigade improv comedy troupe and played "Trotter" in the troupe's sketch comedy series, which ran for three seasons on Comedy Central. Before the show, the UCB comedy foursome had already been doing improv shows at their theatre in New York, which used to be a burlesque house before they remodeled it to become a theatre. To date, they have founded four successful Upright Citizens Brigade comedy theaters located in New York at UCB Chelsea and The East Village UCB, and Los Angeles with UCB Franklin and UCB Sunset.

Besides his sketch work with the Upright Citizens Brigade, Walsh is also known for his memorable supporting roles in popular comedy films in recent years including Old School, Starsky & Hutch, Be Kind Rewind, Ted, and Keeping Up with the Joneses. Walsh also wrote and starred in the cult indie-comedy Martin & Orloff. Walsh was a correspondent on The Daily Show from 2001 to 2002, and made regular appearances in comedy sketches on Late Night with Conan O'Brien and MTV's Human Giant as well as starring in the Comedy Central mockumentary series Dog Bites Man in the summer of 2006. Walsh has the distinction of having appeared in several Todd Phillips comedy films, most often playing characters aptly named "Walsh".

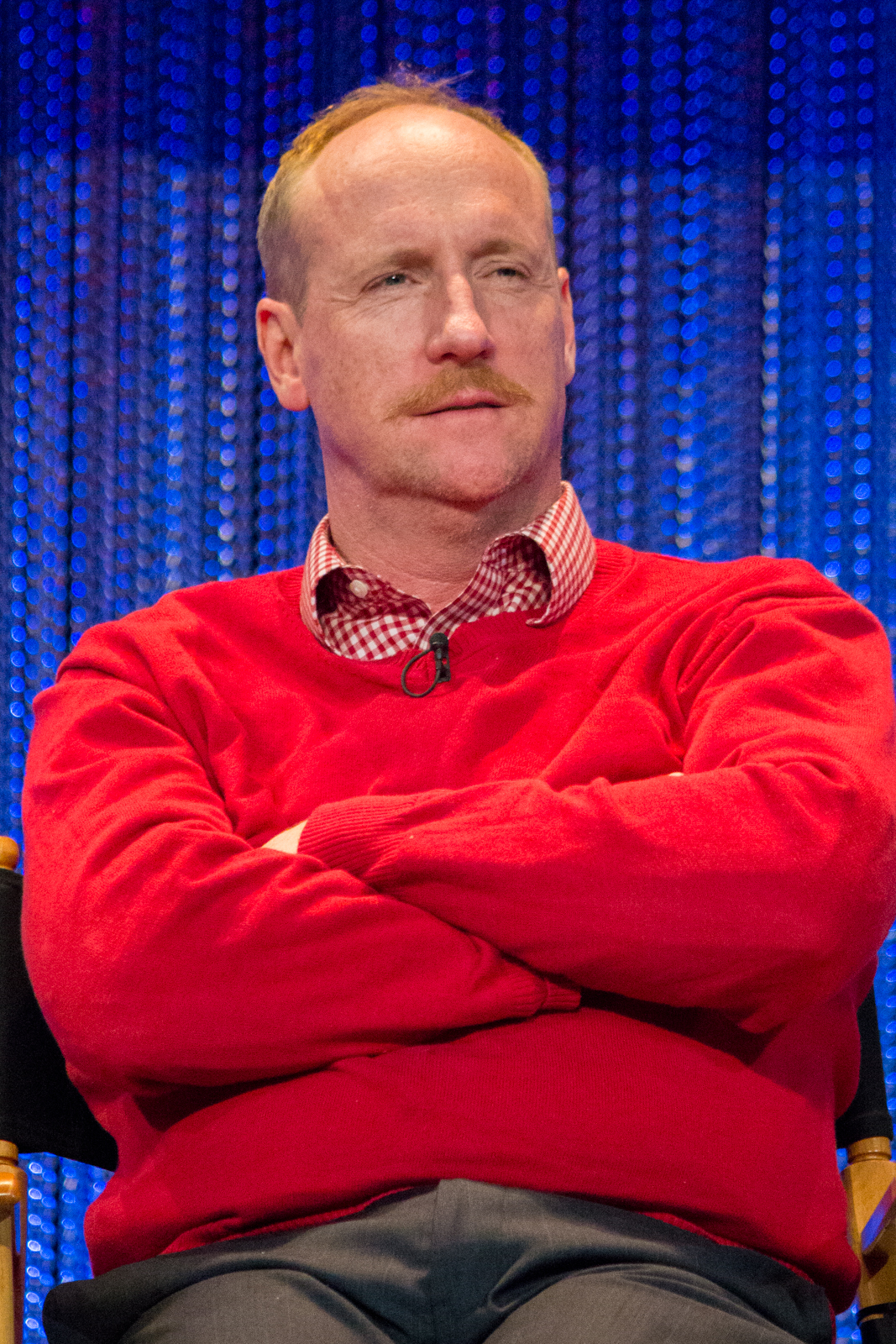
Walsh at the New York PaleyFest panel for "Veep" in 2014.

In 2010, Walsh created the improvised comedy series Players for Spike TV. Walsh (creator, writer, director and executive producer of the show) stars in the series alongside his Upright Citizens Brigade partner Ian Roberts, as two brothers who run a sports bar together. The show aired for one season, concluding on August 14, 2010.

Walsh hosted the podcast Bear Down with comedian Scot Armstrong (screenwriter of Old School) where they discuss their favorite football team the Chicago Bears and do sports-themed comedy bits such as fake call-ins and in-character interviews. The podcast has also featured appearances by comedians such as Horatio Sanz, Ian Roberts, Joe Nunez, and Matt Price.

In 2010, Walsh had recurring roles on the NBC comedy series Outsourced and on the HBO comedy series Hung. In 2012, he began co-starring as Mike McLintock in the HBO series Veep, for which he was nominated for the Primetime Emmy Award for Outstanding Supporting Actor in a Comedy Series in 2016 and 2017. During that year, Walsh portrayed J. R. R. Tolkien in The Dead Authors Podcast.

Walsh directed his first feature film High Road, an indie-comedy he co-wrote with Josh Weiner. The film was released on March 6, 2012. Walsh co-wrote his second film, A Better You, with Brian Huskey, who also stars in the film.

In the movie Into the Storm, Walsh stars as Pete Moore, who is the driver of the Tornado Intercept Vehicle nicknamed "Titus."

He appeared in the MyCareer mode in the basketball simulation game NBA 2K17.

== Filmography ==
=== Film ===
Year	Title	Role	Notes
1998	Tomorrow Night		
1998	Talent	Ted	
1999	Fatty Drives the Bus	Man in Baseball Uniform	
2000	Road Trip	Crime Scene Photographer	
2002	Martin & Orloff	Dr. Eric Orloff	
2003	Pushing Tom	Co-Worker	
2003	Old School	Walsh	
2003	The Test	Joe	Short film
2003	Death of a Dynasty	Frat Boy No. 1	
2003	Elf	Eye Witness	
2003	Brainwarp	Captain Maniac	Video
2003	Bad Santa	Herb	
2004	The Sensual Lover of Bindalele	Budo	Short film
2004	Starsky & Hutch	Eddie	
2004	Christmas with the Kranks	Neighbor #2	
2006	School for Scoundrels	Walsh	
2007	Wild Girls Gone	Sheriff Terry Moran	
2007	Dante's Inferno	Mussolini / Fox Reporter / Airport Security Pursuer (voice)	
2008	Lower Learning	Mr. Conroy	
2008	Be Kind Rewind	Officer Julian	
2008	Drillbit Taylor	Not for Pot Driver	
2008	Semi-Pro	Father Pat	
2008	Step Brothers	Drunk Corporate Guy	
2008	Role Models	Davith of Glencracken	
2009	Mystery Team	Jim	
2009	I Love You, Man	Impatient Golfer	
2009	The Hangover	Dr. Valsh	
2009	The Goods: Live Hard, Sell Hard	Captain Ortiz	
2009	May the Best Man Win	Fred Anderton	
2010	Cyrus	Tim	
2010	Due Date	TSA Agent	
2010	Cherry	Prof. Van Auken	
2010	Breast Picture	Jack	
2011	Freak Dance	Adolf Hitler Jr.	
2012	High Road	Man	Also co-writer and director
2012	Ted	Thomas	
2012	Free Samples	Mr. Hightower	
2012	Queens of Country	Cleveland Norvis	
2012	The Brass Teapot	Antique Dealer	
2013	Movie 43	Amanda's Dad	Segment: "Middleschool Date"
2013	Coffee Town	Police officer	
2014	Hits	Dave	
2014	Into the Storm	Pete	
2014	Sex Ed	Washout	
2014	Jason Nash Is Married	Randy Plymouth	
2014	A Better You	Patrick	Also writer and director
2015	Get Hard	Bathroom Stall Man	
2015	Bad Night	Ari	
2016	Other People	Steve	
2016	The Darkness	Gary Carter	
2016	The Do-Over	Shecky	
2016	Ghostbusters	Rourke	
2016	Wild Oats	Forbes	
2016	Keeping up with the Joneses	Dan Craverston	
2016	Office Christmas Party	Ezra	
2017	Brigsby Bear	Greg Pope	
2018	A Futile and Stupid Gesture	Matty Simmons	
2018	Family	Dan	
2018	Life of the Party	Daniel "Dan" Miles	
2018	Under the Eiffel Tower	Stuart	
2018	Widows	Ken	
2019	The Perfect Date	Charlie Rattigan	
2020	For Madmen Only: The Stories of Del Close	Mike Gold	
2022	Unplugging	Dan Dewerson	Also writer and producer
2022	Father of the Bride	Dr. Gary Saeger	
2022	Press Play	Mr. Knott	
2023	You People	Don Wood	
2023	Flamin' Hot	Lonny Mason	
2023	Jess Plus None	Ranger	
2023	The Good Half	Darren Wheeland	
2023	Bolt from the Blue	Michael	
2023	Not An Artist	Charles	
2024	Suncoast	Mr. Ladd	
2024	Drugstore June	Crawford	
2025	Novocaine	Coltraine	
2025	Little Lorraine	Officer Douglas	
TBA	Chicken	Jeff	Post-production

=== Television ===
Year	Title	Role	Notes
1996	Escape from It's a Wonderful Life	Clarence / Various (voice)	
1996–2000	Saturday Night Live	Angry Dad / Construction Worker / Hidden Camera Victim	3 episodes
1996–2004	Late Night with Conan O'Brien	Various	
1997	Apartment 2F	Iron Stomach	2 episodes
1998–2000	Upright Citizens Brigade	Trotter/Various Characters	30 episodes
2000	Strangers with Candy	Banker / Doctor Robots	Episode: "Yes You Can't"
2001	Late Friday	Old Man	Episode: "#1.6"
2001–2002	The Daily Show	Correspondent	
2004	Cheap Seats without Ron Parker	Gordon Sumner	Episode: "#Stanford-Cal: The 1982 Big Game"
2004	Arrested Development	The D.A.	Episode: "Let 'Em Eat Cake"
2004	O'Grady	Kevin's Dad (voice)	Episode: "The Fly"
2004–2009	Reno 911!	Ranger Glen / Ian Meltzer	5 episodes
2006	Dog Bites Man	Kevin Beeken	9 episodes
2007–2008	Human Giant	Various characters	9 episodes
2008	Worst Week	Peacemon	Episode: "The Monitor"
2008	The Sarah Silverman Program	Tennis Player	Episode: "Patriot Tact"
2008	Little Britain USA	Senator's Press Rep / Businessman at Urinal	3 episodes
2009	The League	Mr. Freidman	Episode: "The Draft"
2009	Aqua Teen Hunger Force	Ray (voice)	Episode: "Fry Legs"
2010	Players	Bruce Fitzgerald	10 episodes
2010	Party Down	Larry Duckett	Episode: "Cole Landry's Draft Day Party"
2010	Nick Swardson's Pretend Time	Police Chief	Episode: "Relapse Into Refreshment"
2010	Community	Joshua the Groundskeeper	Episode: "Aerodynamics of Gender"
2010	Funny or Die Presents	Producer	Episode: "#1.5"
2010	Hung	Matt Saline	6 episodes
2010	Childrens Hospital	Cameraman / Dr. Trotter	2 episodes
2010; 2022	Hell's Kitchen	Himself	2 episodes
2010–2011	Outsourced	Jerry Stern	8 episodes
2011	Jon Benjamin Has a Van	Dr. Nathan Kumerly / Rob Shutterman	2 episodes
2011–2013	NTSF:SD:SUV::	President Grant / NASA Agent	2 episodes
2012	Animal Practice	Alan Waxman	Episode: "Pilot"
2012	Happy Endings	Duckie Blenkinship	Episode: "KickBall 2: The Kickening"
2012	MyMusic	Mr. Indie	Episode: "Back in Black!"
2012–2019	Veep	Mike McLintock	65 episodes
2013	Parks and Recreation	Leonard Tchulm	Episode: "Emergency Response"
2013	The Aquabats! Super Show!	Santa Claus	Episode: "Christmas with the Aquabats!"
2013–2014	Drunk History	Joseph Pulitzer / KKK Member	2 episodes
2013–2016	Comedy Bang! Bang!	L. Jefe Maninchargo	11 episodes
2014	How I Met Your Mother	Captain Dearduff	Episode: "Sunrise"
2014	Bob's Burgers	Rick (voice)	Episode: "The Kids Rob a Train"
2014–2016	Brooklyn Nine-Nine	Detective Lohank	3 episodes
2015	Rick and Morty	Sleepy Gary (voice)	Episode: "Total Rickall"
2015	Playing House	Phil	Episode: "Employee of the Month"
2015	Hot in Cleveland	Arnie	Episode: "Bad Girlfriends"
2016	Animals.	Grey Horse (voice)	Episode: "Rats"
2016	Last Week Tonight with John Oliver	Jason Clark	Episode: "Doping"
2017	Teachers	Harvey	Episode: "Getting Drilled"
2017	Black-ish	President Schock	Episode: "Liberal Arts"
2017	Do You Want to See a Dead Body?	Himself	Episode: "A Body and a Train"
2018	Crazy Ex-Girlfriend	Frank	Episode: "Oh, Nathaniel, It's On!"
2018	Another Period	Father	Episode: "Little Orphan Garfield"
2018	The Good Fight	Judge Oliver Walenstadt	Episode: "Day 443"
2018	Alex, Inc.	Detective Phipps	Episode: "The Grande Apologano"
2018	No Activity	Larry Turnbull	3 episodes
2018	Champaign ILL	Lester Noyce	Episode: "Cherry Vintage Rascal"
2018	The Guest Book	Dave	Episode: "Someplace Other Than Here"
2019	Weird City	Tawny's Dad	Episode: "A Family"
2019	Desus & Mero	Dexter Homeland	Episode: "Electric Lemonade"
2020	American Dad!	Agent (voice)	Episode: "100 Years a Solid Fool"
2020	Star Trek: Lower Decks	Lieutenant Commander Ron Docent (voice)	Episode: "Cupid's Errant Arrow"
2021	Curb Your Enthusiasm	Walt Kinney	Episode: "The Mormon Advantage"
2022	The Conners	Professor Glen	3 episodes
2022	The Conor Moore Show	Various	2 episodes
2022–2025	Ghosts	Elias Woodstone	5 episodes
2023	Dancing with the Stars	Himself/Contestant	Season 32 first to be eliminated
2023	Carol & the End of the World	(voice)	2 episodes
2024	Manhunt	Samuel Mudd	Miniseries
2024	Not Dead Yet	Frederick P. Moreau	Episode: "Not You Yet"
2025	Beavis and Butt-Head	President of Burger World and America / Priest / Public Defender (voice)	3 episodes
2026	Vladimir	David	7 episodes
2026	Law & Order	Joe Sirianni	1 episode
2026	Tires	Claude	1 episode
2026	CIA	Tom Morris	Episode: "Black Tie Optional"
