= Peoples Improv Theater =

Theater in New York City

Coordinates: 40.74052°N 73.98474°W

The Peoples Improv Theater
- The Peoples Improv Theater (The PIT) at 154 West 29th Street in Manhattan, New York City
- Formation: 2002
- Type: Theatre group
- Location: Manhattan, New York: Chapel Hill, North Carolina
- Artistic director: Ali Farahnakian
- Notable members: Ellie Kemper; Kristen Schaal; Hannibal Buress
- Website: thepit-nyc.com

The Peoples Improv Theater (PIT), also known as the PIT, is a comedy theater and training center in New York City, founded by comedian Ali Farahnakian in 2002. Shows combine improvisational comedy, sketch comedy, stand-up, theater, and variety. Each show is hosted by a combination of "house teams" of comedians hired by PIT and by outside comedians.

After closing several of their theaters due to the COVID-19 pandemic, The PIT now only resides in its PIT Loft location in the Chelsea neighborhood of Manhattan.

Notable alumni of the PIT include The Office actress Ellie Kemper, (Note: house improv team: Big Black Car) comedian and voice actress Kristen Schaal, and comedian and actor Hannibal Buress.

== History ==
The Peoples Improv Theater's Loft location was founded by Ali Farahnakian and Armando Diaz in 2002. The PIT moved its headquarters to 123 East 24th Street, New York on December 31, 2010. From September 1, 2015, the original location of the PIT became known as The Pit Loft and officially became the third venue of the PIT.

Wednesdays were designated as "Super Free Wednesday" in the Striker location, with free shows offered to the public. Musical improv troupe Vern performed weekly from 2014-2020 and now performs monthly. Legendary house team Sid Viscous performed weekly for two years in 2007 and 2008, stretching the boundaries of improv with their unique forms including "On Ice" where the group performed on roller skates and their Halloween themed show "Funny Bones" which was performed completely in black lights.

In 2018, Farahnakian opened The PIT Chapel Hill, also known as The PITCH, in his home state, at 462 West Franklin Street, Chapel Hill, North Carolina.

In February 2021, the PIT announced the closure of its Flatiron location, leaving only the Loft open in Manhattan. In June 2021, the PIT Loft reopened, hosting classes, jams, and open mics.

The PIT also published comedy sketches to a collective YouTube channel named PITtv.

== See also ==
- Impact of the COVID-19 pandemic on the performing arts – Aspect of viral outbreak
- Improvisational theatre – Theatrical genre featuring unscripted performance
- List of improvisational theatre companies
- Magnet Theater – Improv theater in New York City
- Upright Citizens Brigade Theater
