= Get Hard =

2015 American crime comedy film by Etan Cohen

- Theatrical release poster
- Directed by: Etan Cohen
- Screenplay by: Jay Martel; Ian Roberts; Etan Cohen
- Story by: Adam McKay; Jay Martel; Ian Roberts
- Produced by: Chris Henchy; Will Ferrell; Adam McKay
- Starring: Will Ferrell; Kevin Hart; Tip 'T.I.' Harris; Alison Brie; Craig T. Nelson
- Cinematography: Tim Suhrstedt
- Edited by: Michael L. Sale
- Music by: Christophe Beck
- Production companies: Gary Sanchez Productions; RatPac-Dune Entertainment
- Distributed by: Warner Bros. Pictures
- Release dates: March 16, 2015 (SXSW); March 27, 2015 (United States)
- Running time: 100 minutes
- Country: United States
- Language: English
- Budget: $40–44 million
- Box office: $111.8 million

Get Hard is a 2015 American crime comedy film directed by Etan Cohen (in his directorial debut) and written by Cohen, Jay Martel, and Ian Roberts. The film stars Will Ferrell and Kevin Hart, with Tip "T.I." Harris, Alison Brie, and Craig T. Nelson in supporting roles. The film focuses on James King (Ferrell), a wealthy investment bank manager who is framed for a crime he did not commit, and asks the man who washes his car, Darnell Lewis (Hart) to help him prepare for prison.

Get Hard premiered at the South by Southwest event on March 16, 2015, and was released in the United States on March 27. The film received generally negative reviews, but was a commercial success, grossing $111.8 million worldwide against a $40–44 million production budget.

== Plot ==
Barrow Funds hedge fund manager James King is engaged to Alissa, his boss Martin Barrow's daughter. At their engagement party, FBI officers arrive and arrest James for fraud and embezzlement. His lawyer, Peter Penny, urges him to plead guilty for a likely shorter sentence, but he refuses believing he will be exonerated.

However, James is found guilty and given the maximum 10 years in San Quentin. Fortunately, the judge allows him a 30-day grace period. In addition, Alissa leaves James after he suggests they flee the country together.

Over time, James has come to know Darnell Lewis, who operates a small car wash business in his work parking lot. Soon after his arrest, James encounters Darnell and, assuming he has been incarcerated before as he is Black, begs him to toughen him up. The financially strapped Darnell, who has zero experience with prison or fighting, agrees for $30,000. He hopes to improve his daughter Makayla's school, far from their bad neighborhood.

Darnell's training, which includes pepper-spraying James, re-modelling his house to resemble a maximum security prison and creating multiple scenarios, so he defends himself, all fail miserably. During the training, James tells Martin he is getting extra help. Fearing James is onto him, he orders the hitman Gayle to monitor him.

As James' training seems to not be working, Darnell suggests James try other tactics to survive prison, so takes him to a gay hookup spot to learn how to perform fellatio. As he is unable, he instead insists Darnell carry on, doing everything possible to "get hard". Working out harder and faster, James makes shivs, learns "keistering" (smuggling contraband in the anus), and seems to be improving.

Simulating a prison riot using James' domestic staff, in the chaos, James gets a shiv stuck in his head. Darnell takes him home for Rita to treat it. James has dinner with Darnell's family and listens to the tale of how he ended up in prison, which is actually a retelling of the movie Boyz n the Hood.

James and Darnell resolve for James to join the Crenshaw Kings gang to gain protection in prison. However, Darnell's cousin and gang leader Russell ejects them, redirecting them to the Alliance of Whites. James is unable to convince them he is racist, so they think he is a cop. They threaten to attack, but Darnell rescues him with a flamethrower.

Eventually, Darnell and James realise Martin framed him. Sneaking into his office, they find evidence of embezzlement on Martin's computer. Before they can expose him, Gayle catches them and takes back the computer, informing James that Darnell is not who he thinks he is and has never been in prison.

Dejected and upset that Darnell lied, James returns to the Crenshaw Kings on his own, asking to join. They accept him as one of their own, so order him to kill someone as his initiation. Before James can do so, Darnell arrives to convince him to expose Martin.

The two sneak onto Martin's yacht to retrieve the computer, only to come across Gayle and his men. James unleashes capoeira moves on them before Martin and Alissa arrive, both confessing to the fraud and embezzlement, a scheme that also included Peter. They try to convince James to run away with them, but he turns them down and heads to a life raft with Darnell. When Gayle shoots it, James pulls out a gun he had "keistered" and aims it at Gayle. U.S. Marshals suddenly appear, summoned by the ankle monitor that James triggered, having crossed the county line.

Evidence on Martin's computer clears James. Martin, Gayle, Alissa, and the henchmen are all arrested. Although James is exonerated, he is sentenced to six months for holding an unlicensed gun. Thanks to Darnell's training, James is fully prepared for his stint in prison, unlike Martin, who panics when he and Peter are immediately attacked when they begin their sentence in San Quentin. James spends his sentence helping the FBI retrieve all the assets Martin stole while guiding Darnell's investments so that he and Rita are able to open their own carwash. As Darnell drives James home upon his release, James announces his intent to celebrate his freedom with a Wall Street Journal and a forty, which he now considers a perfect Sunday.

== Cast ==
- Will Ferrell as James King, a hedge fund manager who is framed for fraud and embezzlement by Martin, Alissa, and Peter.
- Kevin Hart as Darnell Lewis, a car wash attendant who helps James prepare for prison, despite never being in prison.
- Craig T. Nelson as Martin Barrow, the head of Barrow Funds and father of Alissa who frames James for embezzlement.
- Alison Brie as Alissa Barrow, the gold-digging fiancée of James and daughter of Martin Barrow.
- Edwina Findley as Rita Lewis, Darnell's wife.
- Tip "T.I." Harris as Russell, Darnell's cousin who is the leader of the Crenshaw Kings.
- Ariana Neal as Makayla Lewis, Darnell and Rita's daughter.
- Erick Chavarria as Cecelio, James' gardener.
- Katia Gomez as Rosa, James' maid.
- Greg Germann as Peter Penny, a lawyer associated with James and Martin.
- Paul Ben-Victor as Gayle, Martin's hired help.
- John Mayer as himself. He performs at James and Alissa's engagement party and later appears on The Tonight Show Starring Jimmy Fallon where he talks about James and sings a sample from his ballad about him
- Jon Eyez as Big Mike
- Nito Larioza as Jaoa
- Dan Bakkedahl as Leo
- Ron Funches as Jojo, a member of the Crenshaw Kings
- Elliot Grey as Judge V. Carlyle, the judge that presides over James' trial.
- Matt Walsh as Bathroom Stall Man
- T. J. Jagodowski as Chris
- Dominique Perry as Shonda
- Jimmy Fallon as himself (uncredited), he interviews John Mayer about being present during James' arrest.

== Production ==
On December 7, 2012, it was announced that Warner Bros. was in talks to acquire the film written by Ian Roberts and Jay Martel, while Adam McKay and Will Ferrell's Gary Sanchez Productions would produce. On September 17, 2013 Etan Cohen was set to direct. On February 24, 2014, Warner Bros. set the film for a March 27, 2015 release.

On December 7, 2012, Ferrell and Kevin Hart were attached to starring roles. On February 26, 2014, it was announced Craig T. Nelson had joined the cast to play Martin Barrow, the founder of Barrow Funds (Ferrell's character's boss) and also the father of Ferrell's character's fiancée. On March 17, 2014 Alison Brie signed on to star, playing the fiancée of Ferrell's character. On March 21, 2014, Edwina Findley joined the cast to play Rita Hudson, wife to Hart's character. On March 24, 2014 Dan Bakkedahl joined the cast to play Rick, Ferrell's hated enemy at their office. On March 25, 2014, T.I. joined the cast, playing a character named Russell, Hart's character's streetwise cousin.

Principal photography began on March 17, 2014, in New Orleans, and ended on May 14, 2014. The film was somewhat controversial with some perceiving that it was playing into race-related stereotypes. During some scenes Cohen asked Hart's opinion on how some jokes would be perceived by African American audiences and made some changes accordingly. Warner Bros. and Cohen also performed extensive testing to make sure the humor came across well.

=== Music ===
On October 30, 2014, Christophe Beck was hired to compose the music for the film.

== Release ==
The film was released by Warner Bros. Pictures on March 27, 2015.

=== Home media ===
Get Hard was released on DVD and Blu-ray on June 30, 2015.

== Reception ==
=== Box office ===
Get Hard grossed $90.4 million in the United States and Canada, and $21.3 million in other territories for a worldwide total of $111.7 million against a budget of $40 million. (Other reports put the budget at $44 million. The film also received $12.3 million in tax incentives for filming in Louisiana.)

In its opening weekend, the film grossed $33.8 million, coming in second place at the box office behind Home ($52.1 million). It was Ferrell's third-highest opening for a live-action film, behind Talladega Nights: The Ballad of Ricky Bobby ($47 million) and The Other Guys ($35.5 million), and was passed the following December by Daddy's Home ($38.7 million).

=== Critical response ===
Get Hard has received generally negative reviews, with many critics citing the film's overuse of racial jokes. On Rotten Tomatoes, the film has an approval rating of 28% based on 186 reviews, with an average rating of 4.40/10. The site's critical consensus reads, "A waste of two fine funnymen, Get Hard settles for tired and offensive gags instead of tapping into its premise's boundary-pushing potential." On Metacritic the film has a weighted average score of 34 out of 100, based on reviews from 43 critics, indicating "generally unfavorable" reviews. CinemaScore polls conducted during the opening weekend recorded that audiences gave Get Hard an average grade of "B" on an A+ to F scale.

Richard Corliss of Time magazine wrote: "Laughter trumps political fairness, and Get Hard made me laugh at, and with, situations I hadn’t thought could tickle me. The movie has a warm heart beating under its seemingly scabrous shell."

The film was criticized for its gay panic jokes and homophobia.
