= Paul Rust =

American actor, comedian and writer

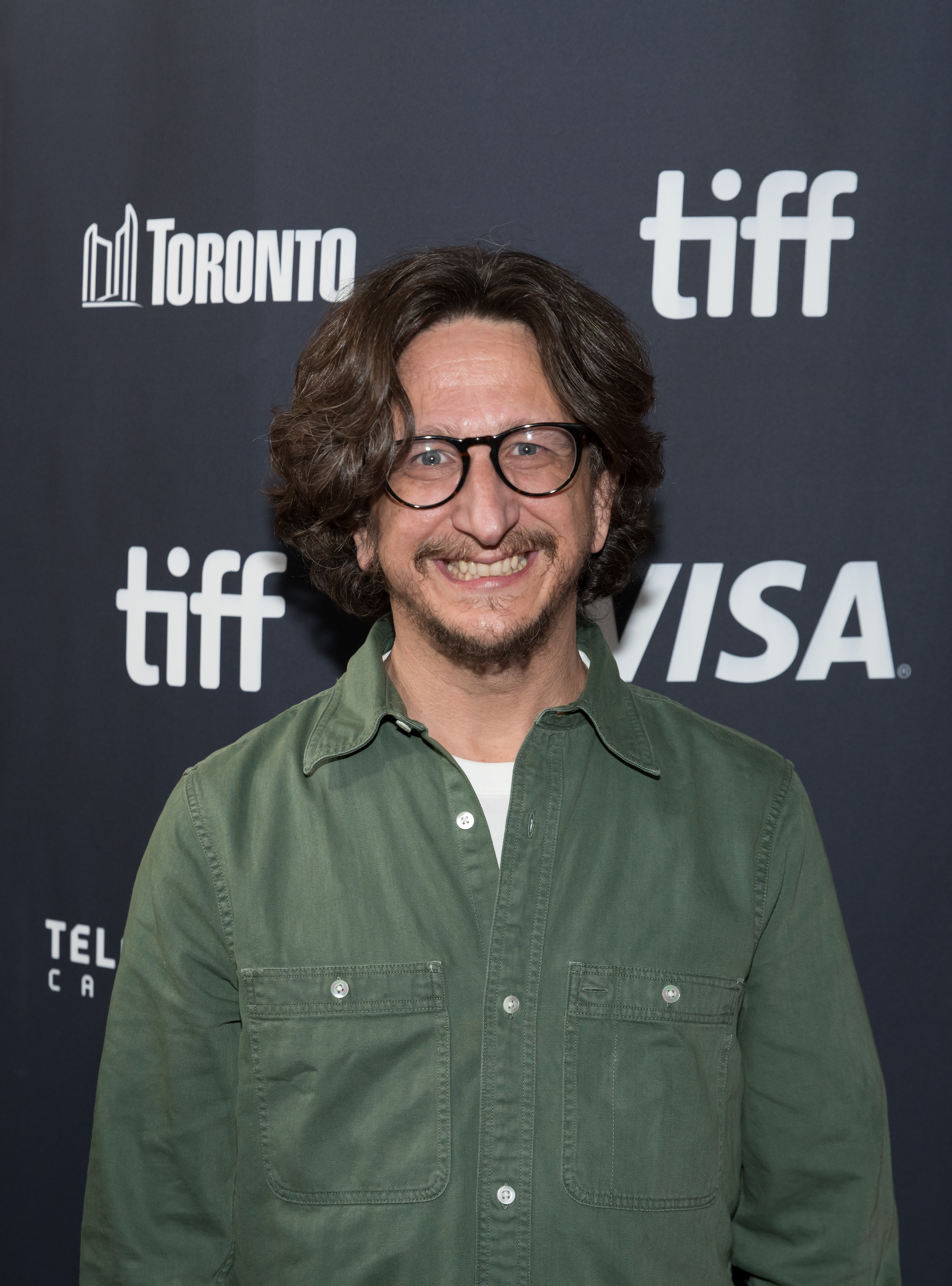
- Rust in 2025
- Born: April 12, 1981 (age 45)
- Education: University of Iowa
- Occupations: Actor; comedian; writer; musician
- Years active: 2003–present
- Spouse: Lesley Arfin (m. 2015)
- Children: 1
- Musical career
- Genres: Comedy music; geek rock
- Instruments: Vocals; bass guitar
- Member of: Don't Stop or We'll Die
- Website: paulrust.com

Paul Rust is an American actor, comedian and writer. He starred in the 2009 film I Love You, Beth Cooper and the Netflix series Love.

== Early life ==
Rust is the son of Jeanne and Bob Rust. His family is of German heritage. Rust was raised Roman Catholic and attended Gehlen Catholic High School in Le Mars, Iowa. His mother was a teacher at Le Mars Community High School and his father owned a Western goods and boot-repair shop. He graduated from the University of Iowa in May 2004.

Rust struggled with obsessive-compulsive disorder in his youth.

== Career ==
Rust is best known as a standup and sketch comedian at the Upright Citizens Brigade Theater in Los Angeles, where he is a member of the sketch comedy group A Kiss from Daddy and the improv team Last Day of School. He has appeared in films such as Inglourious Basterds, Ass Backwards, Freak Dance, Paper Heart and Semi-Pro. He had his highest-profile acting role in 2009, playing the male lead in the comedy film I Love You, Beth Cooper alongside Hayden Panettiere. Rust has written for television programs such as Human Giant and Moral Orel.

In 2010, Rust appeared in the Comedy Central sketch comedy special This Show Will Get You High, created by and starring Matt Besser. He and Paul Reubens co-wrote the 2016 Pee-wee Herman film Pee-wee's Big Holiday.

Rust is a frequent guest on the Comedy Bang! Bang! podcast, where he is best known for his "New No-Nos" segment. He has written for IFC's Comedy Bang! Bang! and was a writer and story editor on the revived for Netflix fourth season of Arrested Development in 2013.

Rust starred in the Judd Apatow-produced Netflix series Love (2016–2018) with Gillian Jacobs. He co-created the show with his wife, Lesley Arfin.

Rust and the comedian Charlyne Yi formed the band The Glass Beef in 2006. They appeared together in a video for "Song Away" by Hockey. He is also the lead singer and bass guitar player in the comedy rock duo Don't Stop or We'll Die with fellow comedian Michael Cassady. The band had Harris Wittels on drums until his death.

In 2018, Rust started hosting In Voorhees We Trust With Gourley and Rust with Matt Gourley, a podcast series reviewing every film in the Friday the 13th franchise. The self-proclaimed "easy-listening cozy-cast", now titled With Gourley and Rust, has had several seasons analyzing and discussing horror films.

== Personal life ==
Rust married comedy writer and author Lesley Arfin in October 2015. They have a daughter born in 2017.

== Filmography ==
=== Film ===
Year	Title	Role	Notes
2004	Exquisite Corpse	Jackson	
2008	Semi-Pro	Wheelchair Darren	
2008	Psycho Sleepover	Carl Sandersburg	
2009	Inglourious Basterds	Pfc. Andy Kagan	
2009	I Love You, Beth Cooper	Dennis Cooverman	
2011	Freak Dance	Weed Fiend	
2013	Ass Backwards	Seth	
2013	iSteve	Billy Corgan	
2016	Pee-wee's Big Holiday	Ernie	Also co-writer
2017	Fun Mom Dinner	Barry	
2019	Between Two Ferns: The Movie	Eugene Tennyson	
2021	Queenpins	Albert Anderson	
2023	Robots	Zach	
2024	Saturday Night	Paul Shaffer	
2025	The Napa Boys	Squirm	

=== Television ===
Year	Title	Role	Notes
2006	Drake & Josh	Ethan	Episode: "Mindy Loves Josh"
2006	Cheap Seats	Canadian Violent Hugger	Episode: "Amazing Games: International Toughmen"
2007	The Right Now! Show	Cast Member	TV special
2009	Late Night with Jimmy Fallon	The Pie Sniffer	1 episode
2010	The Sarah Silverman Program	Customer	Episode: "Smellin' of Troy"
2010–2013	Aqua Teen Hunger Force	Various voices	2 episodes
2011	Mr. Sunshine	Director	2 episodes
2011–2012	The Life & Times of Tim	Various voices	2 episodes
2012–2013	The Aquabats! Super Show!	Ronmark	2 episodes
2012	Eagleheart	Schwartz	Episode: "Honor Thy Marshal"; uncredited
2012	Best Friends Forever	Kurt McAfee	Episode: "Fatal Blow Out"
2012–2016	Comedy Bang! Bang!	Various roles	9 episodes; also writer
2012	Parks and Recreation	Brian Raisins	Episode: "Leslie vs. April"
2012	NTSF:SD:SUV::	Sid	Episode: "16 Hop Street"
2012	Animal Practice	Jerry	Episode: "Clean-Smelling Pirate"
2012–2013	Tron: Uprising	Ott (voice)	2 episodes
2012–2021	Bob's Burgers	Jonas / various voices	5 episodes
2013	Arrested Development		Writer, story editor (season 4)
2013	The Greatest Event in Television History	Director	Episode: "Hart to Hart"
2013–2014	Super Fun Night	Benji	8 episodes
2016–2018	Love	Gus Cruikshank	34 episodes; also co-creator, executive producer, writer
2016	Bajillion Dollar Propertie$	Ricky	Episode: "Farsi Lessons"
2016–2018	Animals.	Mason / P.A. (voice)	3 episodes
2017	SuperMansion	Freckles (voice)	Episode: "Virtual Reality Bites"
2018	American Dad!	Demetri Weinsteinpolis (voice)	Episode: "The Never-Ending Stories"
2019	Brooklyn Nine-Nine	Mikey Joseph	Episode: "The Tattler"
2019	Black Monday	Brandt	Episode: "364"
2019	Drunk History	John Wojtowicz	Episode: "Love"
2021–2025	The Great North	Ham Tobin (voice)	Main role
2021–2022	Central Park	Various voices	3 episodes
2021–2023	Ten Year Old Tom	Randy / Host (voice)	15 episodes
2021	Santa Inc.	Jeremy / Grandpa Smalls (voice)	8 episodes; also writer
2023	History of the World, Part II	DNC Staffer	Episode: "VIII"
2023	Digman!	Kurt (voice)	Episode: "Pilot"
2023	Goosebumps	Mahar	Episode: "Welcome to Horrorland"
2025	Big City Greens	Little Big City Employee (voice)	Episode: "City Wayne"

== Discography ==
Albums (with Don't Stop or We'll Die)

- Gorgeous (2014)
- Dazzle Me (2018)
- SONG-A-WEEK Volume One: Bloom of the Goji (2021)
- Lives of Leisure, SONG-A-WEEK Volume II (2021)
- Signature Please (2023)

EPs (with Don't Stop or We'll Die)

- The Ballad of Bird and Fox (2008)
- One of the Gang (2011)
- Diamond Skies Over Western Dreams (2019)
