= Jack McGee (actor) =

Character actor

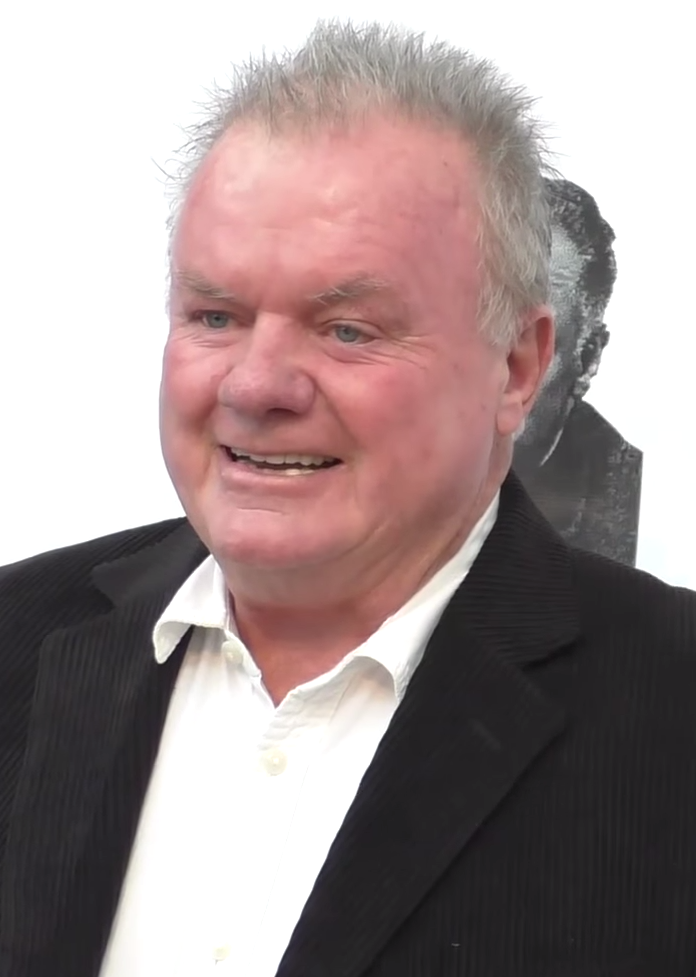
- McGee at the Carney Awards in 2016
- Born: February 2, 1949 (age 77); South Bronx, New York, U.S.
- Occupation: Actor
- Years active: 1985–present
- Spouse: Stephanie McGee

Jack McGee (born February 2, 1949) is an American television and film character actor. He has appeared in more than 100 films and television series.

Known for his gravelly raspy voice, McGee tends to play gruff, blue-collar type characters. He is best known as Chief Jerry Reilly on the television series Rescue Me. He was a regular cast member on the FX series for three seasons. In 2010, he co-starred as Hickey on the Spike TV comedy series Players.

== Early life and career ==
McGee was born in the South Bronx, New York, the youngest of eight children. He attended Cardinal Hayes High School in the Bronx, where he was class president and played on the football team. He appeared as a member of the background harmony in the band The Young Rascals.

In 1977, he became a firefighter for the New York City Fire Department in order to pursue his acting career. As a firefighter, he served with FDNY Engine Company 38 and Ladder Company 51 in the Bronx. In the TV Series Rescue Me, he portrayed FDNY 15th Battalion Chief Jerry Reilly. His first major role was in the 1985 firefighter film Turk 182.

McGee provided the voice for Mr. White in the 2006 Reservoir Dogs video game. He is also the voice of Big Ed in the game Real Heroes: Firefighter, as well as Otis Schmidt, the driver and engineer in the movie Backdraft.

== Personal life ==
His first wife was Eileen.

McGee is a colon cancer survivor, and is committed to several cancer organizations, particularly the WeSpark Cancer Support Center, where his wife Stephanie serves as guest services manager. McGee also supports Autism Speaks, the American Cancer Society, Susan G. Komen for the Cure, the Michael J. Fox Foundation and the Leary Firefighters Foundation.

== Filmography ==
=== Films ===
Table featuring feature films with Jack McGee
Year	Title	Role	Notes
1985	Turk 182	Patron at Hooly's	
1987	Shy People	Cab Driver	
1987	Magic Sticks	McShady	
1987	Five Corners	Desk Sergeant	
1987	Someone to Watch Over Me	Bartender	
1987	The Hidden	Bartender	
1988	The Beat	Mr. Frock	
1988	Scrooged	Carpenter	
1989	Three Fugitives	Fisherman	
1989	Lethal Weapon 2	Mickey McGee	
1989	Born on the Fourth of July	Democratic Delegate	
1990	Cold Dog Soup	Park Cop	
1990	The End of Innocence	Officer Jake	
1990	Waiting for the Light	Slim Slater	
1990	Crash and Burn	Winston Wickett	
1990	Book of Love	Ticket Taker	
1991	Across the Tracks	Frank	
1991	The Doors	Miami Cop	
1991	Backdraft	Schmidt	
1991	Cool as Ice	Clarke	
1992	Basic Instinct	Sheriff	
1992	Lethal Weapon 3	Mickey McGee	
1994	The Paper	Wilder	
1994	Miracle on 34th Street	Tony Falacchi	
1995	Toughguy	Sydney	
1995	Jury Duty	Murphy	
1995	Unstrung Heroes	Lindquist	
1995	Showgirls	Jack / Stagehand	
1996	Rumpelstiltskin	Detective Ben Smith	
1996	The Quest	Harry Smythe	
1997	The Last Days of Frankie the Fly	Jack	
1997	I Love You, Don't Touch Me!	Lou Candela	
1997	Jungle 2 Jungle	Mr. Uhley	
1997	Breakdown	Bartender	
1997	A Simple Wish	Officer O'York	
1997	Star Kid	Hank Bruntley	
1998	Between the Sheets	First A.D.	
1998	Thick as Thieves	Chief	
1998	Chairman of the Board	Harlan Granger	
1998	Overnight Delivery	Stanley	
1999	The Out-of-Towners	Sergeant Jordan	
1999	Standing on Fishes		
1999	Treehouse Hostage	Nick	
2000	Stardust	Deputy	
2000	Mars and Beyond	Dr. Zed Dangerworth	
2000	The Prophecy 3: The Ascent	Detective	
2000	The Flintstones in Viva Rock Vegas	Bronto Crane Examiner	
2000	Bread and Roses	Bert	
2000	Very Mean Men	Jocko Mulroney	
2000	Coyote Ugly	Baseball Pitcher	
2000	Thirteen Days	Mayor Daley	
2001	Early Bird Special	Halloway	
2001	Do You Wanna Know a Secret?	Police Chief Gavin	
2001	The Man Who Wasn't There	P.I. Burns	
2001	Air Rage	Simpson	
2001	The Big Day	Burly Man	
2001	Living in Fear	Cliff Bartok	
2001	Race to Space	Fielding	
2001	Gedo	Jackson Jones	
2002	Wheelmen	Tony	
2002	Malevolent	Eddie the Bartender	
2002	Random Shooting in L.A.	Pawnbroker	
2003	Carolina	Liquor Store Clerk	
2003	Legally Blonde 2: Red, White & Blonde	Detective Finchley	
2003	Buffoon	Blue	Short film
2004	Quiet Kill	The Chief	
2004	The Dark Agent and the Passing of the Torch Chapter 7	Jack	Short film
2004	Soccer Dog: European Cup	Knox	
2004	Crash	Gun Store Owner	
2004	Blonde	Agent #1	Short film
2005	Domino	Detective Chris Cudlitz	
2006	Open Season	Hunter	Voice role
2007	The Alphabet Killer	Hank	
2007	Tyrannosaurus Azteca	Gria	
2008	Finding Amanda	Guy in Racebook	
2008	21	Terry	
2009	Coming Attraction	Fred Hillard	
2009	The International	Detective Ward	
2010	Father of Invention	Parole Officer	
2010	Marmaduke	Dalmatian	Voice role
2010	The Fighter	George Ward	Boston Society of Film Critics Award for Best Ensemble; Central Ohio Film Critics Association Award for Best Ensemble; Nominated—Screen Actors Guild Award for Outstanding Performance by a Cast in a Motion Picture; Nominated—Broadcast Film Critics Association Award for Best Cast; Nominated—San Diego Film Critics Society Award for Best Cast; Nominated—Washington D.C. Area Film Critics Association Awards for Best Ensemble
2011	Drive Angry	Lou "Fat Lou"	
2011	Moneyball	Rocco	
2013	Gangster Squad	Lt. Quincannon	
2015	Silver Skies	Nick	
2017	Father Figures	Patrick O'Callaghan / Kevin O'Callaghan	Played twin brothers
2019	I'd Like to Be Alone Now	Hank	

=== Television ===
Table featuring feature television with Jack McGee
Year	Title	Role	Notes
1987	Student Exchange	Student Cabbie	Television film
1988	Night Court	Fast Eddie Creeger	Episode: "Mac's Millions"
1988	CBS Summer Playhouse	Ellison	Episode: "Off Duty"
1989	Perfect Strangers	Policeman in Bar	Episode: "Crimebusters"
1989	L.A. Law	John Brianson	2 episodes
1989	Roseanne	Worker	Episode: "Somebody Stole My Gal"
1990	Sunset Beat	Bickford	Episode: "One Down, Four Up"
1990	I'm Dangerous Tonight	Landlord	Television film
1991	Midnight Caller	Joey	Episode: "Can't Say N-N-No"
1991	Twin Peaks	Bartender	Episode: "On the Wings of Love"
1991	MacGyver	Joe Roswell	Episode: "The Prometheus Syndrome"
1992	The Wonder Years	Mr. Kaplan	Episode: "Sex and Economics"
1993	Space Rangers	Doc Kreuger	6 episodes
1993	Murphy Brown	Male Clerk	Episode: "To Market, to Market"
1994	18 Minutes in Albuquerque	Maurice	Television film
1994	seaQuest DSV	Mike Lutz	Episode: "Whale Song"
1996	Diagnosis: Murder	Stan Macky	Episode: "Murder Murder"
1996	NYPD Blue	Bob Daniels / Fort Lee Sergeant	Episode: "A Death in the Family"
1996	The Faculty		Episode: "Clark's Crisis"
1997	Pacific Blue		Episode: "Runaway"
1997	Seinfeld	Ralph	Episode: "The Pothole"
1997	The Jeff Foxworthy Show	Red	Episode: "Foxworthy Shall Rise Again"
1997	EZ Streets	Leo / Union Hiring Boss	4 episodes
1997	Gun	Pawnbroker	Episode: "Columbus Day"
1997	The Practice	Detective	Episode: "Betrayal"
1997	Brooklyn South	Kevin O'Donnell	Episode: "Why Can't Even a Couple of Us Get Along?"
1998	Baywatch	Tommy	Episode: "Full Throttle"
1998	Chicago Hope	Stanley McGaftin / Det. Jack Yost	2 episodes
1998	That's Life	Vince	Episode: "The Sixth One to Air"
1998	Buffy the Vampire Slayer	Doug Perren	Episode: "Becoming: Part 1"
1998	Houdini	Street Vendor	Television film
1998	ER	Rodney McMullen	Episode: "They Treat Horses, Don't They?"
1999	The Darwin Conspiracy		Television film
1999	The Magnificent Seven	Big Lester Banks	Episode: "Achilles"
2000	Whatever	Ken	1 episode
2000	The X-Files	Bob Damphouse	Episode: "Fight Club"
2001	Providence	Lyle Gibbons	Episode: "Exposure"
2001	The Division	N/A	Episode: "The Parent Trap"
2001	Spin City	Officer Greenfield	Episode: "A Shot in the Dark: Part 1"
2001	The Huntress	Wes Lonigan	5 episodes
2001	Touched by an Angel	Bubba	Episode: "Angels Anonymous"
2002–2008	CSI: Crime Scene Investigation	Richard O'Malley / Road Manager	2 episodes
2002	Little John	Bailiff	Television film
2003	Charmed	Hawker Demon	Episode: "Baby's First Demon"
2003	Carnivàle	Bulldozer Driver	Episode: "Milfay"
2003–2004	Malcolm in the Middle	Coach Oleski	2 episodes
2004–2007	Rescue Me	Chief Jerry Reilly	Main role (seasons 1–3); recurring (season 4)
2006	Without a Trace	Charlie Harvey	Episode: "Rage"
2006	Cold Case	Bobby McCallister	Episode: "Sandhogs"
2007	Crossing Jordan	Mickey Rowan	Episode: "Crazy Little Thing Called Love"
2007	Veronica Mars	Mr. Murphy	Episode: "Un-American Graffiti"
2007–2016	Law & Order: Special Victims Unit	Lt. Allan James / Lieutenant Allan James/Deputy Inspector Bob O'Brien	2 episodes
2009	Monk	Sergeant Danny Weaver	Episode: "Mr. Monk and the Badge"
2010	Players	Hickey	10 episodes
2010	Castle	Dale Fickas	Episode: "The Third Man"
2010	The Whole Truth	Stan Klotz	2 episodes
2012	Hawaii Five-0	Deep Throat	Episode: "Ua Hopu"
2012	Common Law	Captain Mike Sutton	12 episodes
2013	Axe Cop	Turkey Turkey	Voice role Episode: "28 Days Before"
2014	The McCarthys	Arthur McCarthy	Main role
2015	Grandfathered	Willie	Episode: "Guys' Night"
2016	Mike & Molly	Officer Gronski	Episode: "Cops on the Rocks"
2016	Blue Bloods	Father Quinn	Episode: "The Road to Hell"
2016	Person of Interest	Police Officer	Episode: "?"
2016	Pitch	Buck Garland	Recurring role 6 episodes
2016	Mom	Frank	Episode: "Xanax and a Baby Duck"
2016	Bones	Roy Bloom	Episode: "The Movie in the Making"
2016	It's Always Sunny In Philadelphia	Lt. Lance Girard	Episode: "Making Dennis Reynolds a Murderer"
2020	9-1-1	John “Red” Delacroix	Episode: "The One That Got Away"
2020	Broke	Ernie Dixon	Episode: "Daddy Issues"
2020	Bob Hearts Abishola	Mr. Clark	Episode: "On a Dead Guy's Bench"
2022	NCIS	Richard Jordan	Episode: "Starting Over"

=== Public service announcements (PSAs) ===
Table featuring feature public service announcements with Jack McGee
Title	Year	Role	Notes
PlugInAmerica.org Drive Electric	2010	General	
