= Upright Citizens Brigade (TV series) =

American sketch comedy television series

- Genre: Sketch comedy
- Starring: Matt Besser; Amy Poehler; Ian Roberts; Matt Walsh
- Country of origin: United States
- Original language: English
- No. of seasons: 3
- No. of episodes: 30

Production
- Camera setup: Single-camera
- Running time: 22 minutes

Original release
- Network: Comedy Central
- Release: August 19, 1998 – April 3, 2000

Upright Citizens Brigade is an American sketch comedy television series. It premiered on August 19, 1998, on Comedy Central, with three seasons of ten episodes each. It features four members of Upright Citizens Brigade, an improvisational sketch comedy group. The cast includes Matt Besser, Amy Poehler, Ian Roberts, and Matt Walsh. The cast later reunited for another series called The UCB Show, of a similar format that premiered in 2016 on Seeso.

== Episodes ==
Season	Episodes	Originally aired		Time slot
Season	Episodes	Season premiere	Season finale	Time slot
1	10	August 19, 1998	November 4, 1998	Wednesdays 10:30 p.m.
2	10	June 14, 1999	August 23, 1999	Mondays 10:30 p.m.
3	10	January 17, 2000	April 3, 2000	Mondays 10:30 p.m.

=== Season 1 (1998) ===
No.	Title	Original release date
1	"The Bucket of Truth"	August 19, 1998
2	"The Story of the Toad"	August 26, 1998
3	"Power Marketing"	September 2, 1998
4	"Children's Revolution"	September 9, 1998
5	"Poo Stick"	September 23, 1998
6	"Saigon Suicide Show"	September 30, 1998
7	"The Lady of the Lake"	October 7, 1998
8	"Time Machine"	October 14, 1998
9	"Cyborgs"	October 21, 1998
10	"The Little Donny Foundation"	November 4, 1998

=== Season 2 (1999) ===
No.	Title	Original release date
1	"Master Dialectitian"	June 14, 1999
2	"Bomb Squad"	June 21, 1999
3	"Mogomra vs. The Fart Monster"	June 28, 1999
4	"Real World"	July 5, 1999
5	"Eli's Face Therapy"	July 12, 1999
6	"Infested with Friars"	July 19, 1999
7	"Spaghetti Jesus"	July 26, 1999
8	"Big City"	August 9, 1999
9	"Hurricane"	August 16, 1999
10	"Supercool"	August 23, 1999

=== Season 3 (2000) ===
No.	Title	Original release date
1	"Costumes"	January 17, 2000
2	"Mafia"	January 24, 2000
3	"Hospital"	January 31, 2000
4	"Band"	February 7, 2000
5	"Eating"	February 21, 2000
6	"College"	February 28, 2000
7	"Sex"	March 6, 2000
8	"Small Town"	March 20, 2000
9	"Technology"	March 27, 2000
10	"Pro Thunderball"	April 3, 2000
