= Matt Besser =

American actor and comedian (born 1967)

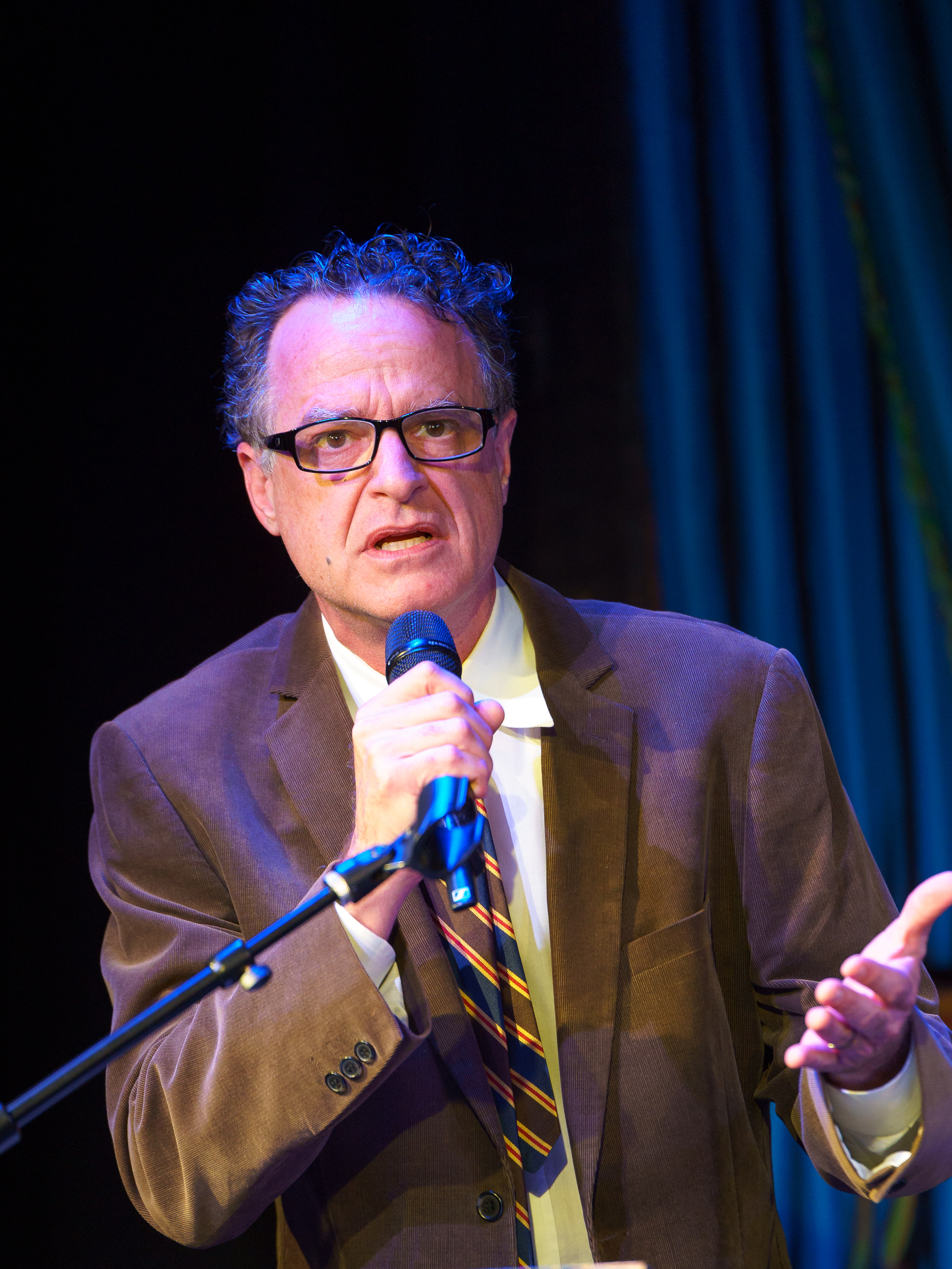
- Besser at SXSW 2024
- Born: Matthew Gregory Besser; September 22, 1967 (age 59); Little Rock, Arkansas, U.S.
- Education: Amherst College
- Occupations: Actor; comedian; director; producer; writer
- Years active: 1988–present
- Spouse: Danielle Schneider (m. 2008)
- Children: 1
- Family: Joe Besser (first cousin twice removed)
- Website: mattbesser.com

Matthew Gregory Besser (born September 22, 1967) is an American actor, comedian, director, producer, writer, and one of the four founding members of the Upright Citizens Brigade sketch comedy troupe, who had their own show on Comedy Central from 1998 to 2000. He hosts the improvisation-based podcast Improv4humans, previously on the Earwolf network, but now solely operated by himself and Brett Morris.

== Early life ==
Besser was born and raised in Little Rock, Arkansas, to parents Diane and Sandy Besser. His father was Jewish, and his mother was Christian. Besser is an atheist. He is a quarter German and a quarter French from his mother's side. Besser's grandfather's cousin was Joe Besser of The Three Stooges.

He was recruited to play soccer after starting on his high school team, but instead attended Amherst College with a major in American Studies. There, he started doing stand-up comedy and competed in a contest at UMass that was judged by Judd Apatow. After graduating, he briefly moved to Denver in an attempt to pursue stand-up, but quickly moved to Chicago. He worked various odd jobs, including stints as a substitute teacher, a host at Carnegie Deli and as a host at Dick's Last Resort.

== Career ==
After seeing an improvisational comedy show at Second City iO Theater featuring Dave Koechner, Tim Meadows and Chris Farley, Besser began taking classes there. His improv group Victim's Family (alongside Rick Roman, Adam McKay, Miles Stroth, and Ian Roberts), later renamed The Family (minus Roman, plus Neil Flynn, and Ali Farahnakian), was directed by Del Close, the first long-form group Del focused on.

Besser is a founding member of Upright Citizens Brigade, which began as a sketch comedy group in Chicago in 1990. Original members included Ian Roberts, Ali Farahnakian, Adam McKay, Rick Roman, and Horatio Sanz.

In 1993, UCB were regular guests on stage at the New Variety produced and hosted by R. O'Donnell at the Chicago Improv comedy club.

While performing at the New Variety, Besser was cast and directed by O'Donnell in the New Year's Eve special Twisted, which aired on WFLD Fox 32 TV, Chicago. Twisted also featured Besser (and comedian Michelle Garb) in a series of improvised commercials directed by O'Donnell for McDonald's, Toyota, and Ameritech.

In 1996, the UCB relocated to New York City. Their sketch-comedy series Upright Citizens Brigade aired for three seasons on Comedy Central from 1998 to 2000. The cast consisted of Besser, Amy Poehler, Ian Roberts, and Matt Walsh. It originally included a voice-over by Del Close. After its cancellation, Comedy Central released all three seasons on DVD.

Besser and the UCB moved on to other projects and opened comedy theaters in New York City and Los Angeles. Besser went on to be the creator and co-star of the Redman & Method Man MTV hidden camera prank show Stung. In 2004, he created and starred in his second Comedy Central show, Crossballs, which mocked news debate shows by pitting fake experts (played by Besser and other comedians) against real people.

Besser has appeared in films such as Walk Hard: The Dewey Cox Story, Martin & Orloff, Year One, Undead or Alive, Drillbit Taylor, and Junebug, in addition to a number of sitcoms including Reno 911!, How I Met Your Mother, New Girl and alongside his wife Danielle Schneider in Community. In 2003, the UCB filmed their first full-length improvised movie, Wild Girls Gone. In early 2010 the film was screened at several indie theaters in the Los Angeles area and is sold for digital download on iTunes and on DVD at the official UCB Theater website. The troupe had also performed their signature brand of longform improv (ASSSSCAT) in a special for the Bravo channel in 2005. In 2008, they released a DVD entitled ASSSSCAT!: Renegade Improv Comedy through Shout! Factory, which features an uncensored improv performance by the troupe and special guests. The DVD also includes deleted scenes and along with other bonus features.

In 2008, Besser played the part of "Courtney Frenchip", the hippie roommate of David Cross in David's Situation, a pilot made for HBO written by Cross and Bob Odenkirk. The pilot was filmed live on May 9, 2008, but was not picked by HBO as a series. In 2013, he portrayed Edwin Stanton in the "Chicago" episode of Comedy Central's Drunk History. Between 2011 and 2014, he appeared on Parks and Recreation as the morning DJ Crazy Ira.

Besser and the UCB continue to run a Los Angeles comedy theater in Franklin Village. Besser and the UCB perform several times a week at the Los Angeles theater, in their show ASSSSCAT 3000 every Sunday night.

== Other work ==
Besser makes frequent appearances on many podcasts on the Earwolf podcasting network, including Comedy Bang Bang, as well as hosting The Earwolf Challenge, a reality-competition series where several podcasters compete against each other.

Besser's Comedy Central pilot This Show Will Get You High aired as a sketch comedy special on October 27, 2010. The show featured video shorts and sketches from Besser and Upright Citizens Brigade Theater comedians John Gemberling, Brett Gelman, Paul Rust, and Betsy Sodaro, and Nathan Barnett.

In 2011, Besser began hosting the Improv4humans podcast, where he and guest improvisers perform scenes based on suggestions sent in via Twitter. The podcast releases an episode each week and has differing guests.

Besser wrote and directed his first film, Freak Dance, based on his long-running UCB stage show. The film premiered at the Austin Film Festival on October 21, 2011, and had a limited theatrical and video on-demand release in May 2012. The film was made available on DVD and iTunes on July 10, 2012.

In 2014, Besser and comedian Rich Fulcher had an Adult Swim special air as part of the channel's "4AM Infomercial Parody" series, called In Search Of Miracle Man. Besser and Fulcher hosted the show as two men claiming the second coming of a savior they call "Miracle Man".

Besser co-starred in both seasons of the Hulu comedy series The Hotwives, which stars his wife Danielle Schneider, who also co-created the series. Besser plays the husband of Schneider's character. In 2015, Besser and Schneider played another married couple ("Blake and Karen") in the epilogue of a 2015 episode of the comedy series Community.

== Personal life ==
Besser married actress-comedian Danielle Schneider in 2008. Their daughter was born on July 28, 2013.
