= Horatio Sanz =

American actor and comedian (born 1969)

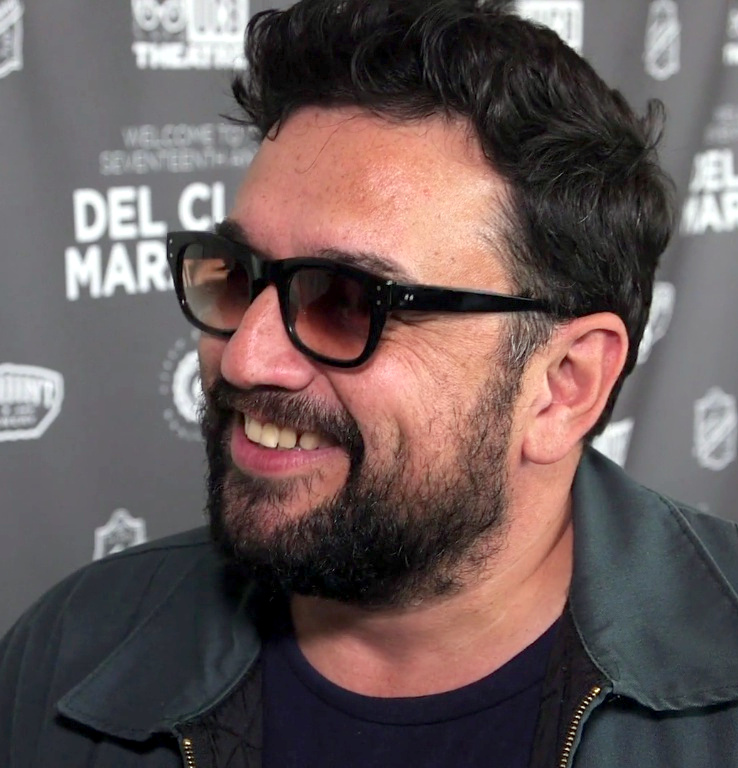
- Sanz in 2015
- Born: Horacio Sanz; June 4, 1969 (age 57); Santiago, Chile
- Occupations: Comedian; actor
- Years active: 1994–present
- Relatives: Carlos Sanz (brother)

Horacio Sanz (born June 4, 1969), better known by his stage name Horatio Sanz, is an American comedian and actor. Sanz was a cast member on the NBC sketch comedy series Saturday Night Live (SNL) from 1998 to 2006.

== Early life ==
Horacio Sanz was born on June 4, 1969, in Santiago, Chile to Sylvia and Carlos Sanz. He is the youngest of three sons and the younger brother of actor Carlos Sanz. He grew up in the Humboldt Park neighborhood of Chicago.

== Career ==
Sanz performed at various theaters in Chicago, including The Court Theater and The Second City, where he was a member of their Chicago ETC theater. While in Chicago, Sanz was also one of the founding members of the Upright Citizens Brigade (UCB) sketch comedy and improv troupe. Sanz can still be seen regularly performing with the sketch troupe at their long-running improv show "ASSSSCAT 3000", at both of the UCB's comedy theaters, located in New York City and Los Angeles.

=== Saturday Night Live ===
Sanz joined the cast of Saturday Night Live in September 1998 as the first Hispanic cast member. At the beginning of SNL's 31st season, he was the temporary replacement for Tina Fey as Amy Poehler's Weekend Update co-anchor while Fey was on maternity leave until she resumed her duties on October 22, 2005. On September 20, 2006, SNL announced that Sanz would not be returning due to budget cuts.

Sanz returned to SNL as a guest on February 3, 2007, appearing as Elton John, and on November 3, as presidential candidate Bill Richardson and again on the December 17, 2011, Christmas show as himself in a musical number ("I Wish It Was Christmas Today") and as a member of Beethoven's orchestra ("Beethoven: Meet The Band").

==== Characters on SNL ====
- Aaron Neville as a courtroom judge on City Court, who sang and overused cocoa butter
- Gobi, the cannabis-loving co-host of Jarret's Room
- Jasper Hahn, a cartoonist whose creations always start out as raunchy drawings of genitals
- Rick, stepfather of Kaitlin (played by Amy Poehler)
- Jeffrey's Clothing Store customer
- Carol, a cheerful and crass woman
- Ferey Mühtar, host of "The Ferey Mühtar Talk Show"
- Manuel Pantalones, bandleader on "Showbiz Grande Explosion"
- Frankie Hilbert, from the Boston Teens
- Vasquez-Gomez-Vasquez
- One of the Telemundo actors from "Besos Y Lagrimas"
- Gerardo
- Sammo Hung
- Matt LeBlanc as his character Joey Tribbiani from the TV show Friends
- Elton John
- Billy Joel
- Rosie O'Donnell
- Gene Shalit
- Umberto Unity
- Ozzy Osbourne

=== After SNL ===
Sanz was part of the cast of the short-lived ABC sitcom In the Motherhood in 2009, playing the role of Horatio the "manny" (male nanny). In 2010, Sanz and his former SNL castmate Chris Parnell starred together on Big Lake, a Comedy Central sitcom from executive producers Will Ferrell and Adam McKay. From 2010 to 2011, Sanz was a writer and producer on the Comedy Central sketch series Nick Swardson's Pretend Time.

In 2015, he started his own podcast called The Hooray Show, which features comedy sketches and interviews with his friends in comedy.

Sanz appeared as a guest on The Big Alakens, the Big Lake marathon fundraiser episode of The George Lucas Talk Show.

== Personal life ==
In November 2008, Sanz made his first public appearance in almost a year, after having lost 100 pounds (45 kg; 7 st 2 lb). "I've been eating better", Sanz said. "I've been trying to come up with a joke about how I've lost weight and I was going to say, 'I stopped putting nuts in my sundaes.'" He also says, "I never weighed myself when I was at my fattest, because I was scared I might die'." Sanz says he has been working out, too.

He became an American citizen on July 25, 2018, in Los Angeles, California.

=== Sexual assault allegation ===
On August 12, 2021, a lawsuit was filed against Sanz, accusing him of sexual assault. The plaintiff, remaining anonymous, claimed that Sanz groped her and made sexual comments to her when she was under the age of 18. The lawsuit also stated that both Saturday Night Live and NBC permitted and enabled him to groom and harm her, and accused Sanz of a direct assault that allegedly happened in front of other staff members in May 2002. Sanz responded through his attorney, calling the allegations "categorically false."

NBCUniversal filed a motion to dismiss the lawsuit in April 2022, stating "Employers owe no general duty to protect third-persons from the possibility of sexual abuse by their employees". In August 2022, the accuser requested that Jimmy Fallon, Tracy Morgan, and Lorne Michaels be added to the lawsuit as defendants, alleging they enabled Sanz's behavior. On November 23, 2022, Sanz settled with the accuser and the lawsuit was dismissed.

== Filmography ==
=== Film ===
Year	Title	Role	Notes
1994	Miracle on 34th Street	Orderly	
2000	Road Trip	French Toast Guy	
2001	Tomcats	Steve	
2002	The New Guy	Dance Instructor	
2003	Boat Trip	Nick Ragoni	
2003	National Lampoon's Barely Legal	Vic Ramalot	
2005	Rebound	Mr. Newirth	
2005	The Man	Santos	Uncredited
2006	School for Scoundrels	Diego	
2007	Lucky You	Ready Eddie	
2008	Step Brothers	Lead singer of Billy Joel cover band	
2009	Me Time	Sam	Short
2009	Year One	Enmebaragesi	
2009	May the Best Man Win	The Mayor	
2010	Freak Dance	Barrio's Brother	
2011	Hollywood & Wine	Tony	Video
2011	High Road	Doctor	
2012	Bachelorette	Gena's love interest	
2012	The Dictator	Aide on Balcony	
2012	Wreck-It Ralph	Duncan	Voice
2013	G.B.F.	Principal Crowe	
2014	Search Party	Cabana Man	
2015	Don Quixote	Sancho Panza	
2016	Is That a Gun in Your Pocket?	Luis	
2017	Actors Anonymous	Juan	
2018	Ralph Breaks the Internet	Duncan	Voice
2019	Zeroville	Francis Ford Coppola	
2021	Clifford the Big Red Dog	Raul	

=== Television ===
Year	Title	Role	Notes
1998–2000	Upright Citizens Brigade	Various	3 episodes
1998–2006	Saturday Night Live	Various	158 episodes
2002	Ed	DJ Desmond Peyton	Episode: "The Divorce"
2002–2004	Fillmore!	Jr. Commissioner 'Dutch' Vallejo	Voice, 24 episodes
2009	In the Motherhood	Horatio	7 episodes
2010	30 Rock	Maynard	Episode: "Anna Howard Shaw Day"
2010	Players	Dirk	Episode: "Cumdog Millionaire"
2010	Big Lake	Glenn Cordoba	10 episodes
2010	Nick Swardson's Pretend Time	Future Man	Episode: "Mudslide Junction"
2011–2013	The Problem Solverz	Ralphe	Voice, 2 episodes
2012	Are We There Yet?	Mr. Peterson	5 episodes
2012	The Life & Times of Tim	Eduardo	Voice, episode: "Super Gay Eduardo/The Pros and Cons of Killing Tim"
2012	Girls	Terry Lavoyt	Episode: "Hannah's Diary"
2012	Gravity Falls		Voice, 2 episodes
2013	House of Lies	Photographer	Episode: "Til Death Do Us Part"
2013	The Greatest Event in Television History	Max	Episode: "Hart to Hart"
2013	Murder Police	Donel	Voice, 13 episodes
2013	NTSF:SD:SUV	Mr. Barbato	Episode: "Comic Con-Air"
2013–2015	Drunk History	Various	2 episodes
2013–2016	Comedy Bang! Bang!	Various	5 episodes
2014	The Hotwives of Orlando	Tito	Episode: "Pimps and Hoo-Ha's"
2014	BoJack Horseman	Latin Kings Gang Leader	Voice, episode: "Our A-Story Is a 'D' Story"
2014	Friends with Better Lives	Craig	Episode: "No More Mr. Nice Guy"
2014	Bad Judge	Mr. Thorpe	Episode: "Pilot"
2014	The Birthday Boys	Boss	Episode: "Getting Preachy"
2015	Parks and Recreation	Himself	Episode: "One Last Ride"
2015	Unbreakable Kimmy Schmidt	Hector	Episode: "Kimmy Gets a Job!"
2015	Modern Family	Armando	Episode: "American Skyper"
2015	Bubble Guppies	Sergeant Pickle	Voice, episode: "Fruit Camp!"
2015	Long Live the Royals	Allistair / Knight #1	Voice, 4 episodes
2016	Scorpion	Heywood Jahelpme Morris	4 episodes
2016	Animals	Julio	Voice, episode: "Pigeons."
2016	Bajillion Dollar Propertie$	Dr. Horowitz	Episode: "Inside Joke"
2016	Son of Zorn	Uber Driver	Episode: "Defender of Teen Love"
2017–2018	Love	Jeff	3 episodes
2017	Do You Want to See a Dead Body?	Himself	Episode: "A Body and a Bust"
2017–2018	Great News	Justin	Main role; 23 episodes
2018	GLOW	Ray	2 episodes
2018	Elena of Avalor	Santos Gutierrez	Voice, episode: "All Kingdoms Fair"
2019–2021	Black Monday	Wayne	Recurring, 15 episodes
2019–2021	Big Hero 6: The Series	El Fuego	Voice, 4 episodes
2019–2020	The Mandalorian	Mythrol	2 episodes
2020	Close Enough	Raoul	Voice, episode: "Prank War/Cool Moms"
2020	Mapleworth Murders	Weird Man	Episode: "The Case of the Case of Wine: Part I"
2020	The George Lucas Talk Show	Himself	Episode: "The Big Alakens Marathon"
2021	Duncanville	Douglas	Voice, episode: "Sibling Reverly"
2021	Curb Your Enthusiasm	Plumber	Episode: "What Have I Done?"

== Awards and honors ==
Sanz received "high" honors at High Times magazine's 2003 Stony Awards, collecting the "Stoner of the Year" award.

== See also ==
- List of recurring Saturday Night Live characters and sketches

Preceded by Tina Fey	Weekend Update; 2005	Succeeded by Tina Fey
Notes and references
1. Sanz was a temporary replacement for Fey while she was on maternity leave from October 1–8, 2005.
