= Comedy Bang! Bang! (TV series) =

Improvisational comedy television series

- Genre: Comedy; Talk show; Sketch comedy
- Created by: Scott Aukerman
- Starring: Scott Aukerman; Reggie Watts; Kid Cudi; "Weird Al" Yankovic
- Opening theme: "Comedy Bang! Bang!"
- Composers: Reggie Watts; Kid Cudi; "Weird Al" Yankovic
- Country of origin: United States
- Original language: English
- No. of seasons: 5
- No. of episodes: 110 (list of episodes)

Production
- Executive producers: Scott Aukerman; Dave Kneebone; Leo Allen; Neil Campbell; Benjamin Berman
- Producers: Carl Fieler; Jeff Ullrich
- Production location: Los Angeles, California
- Running time: 22 minutes
- Production companies: Comedy Bang! Bang! Productions; Earwolf Media; Abso Lutely Productions; IFC Original Productions

Original release
- Network: IFC
- Release: June 8, 2012 – December 2, 2016

Comedy Bang! Bang! is a television talk show created and hosted by Scott Aukerman. The show aired weekly on IFC and was a spin-off of Aukerman's podcast Comedy Bang! Bang!, which airs on the Earwolf network. Like the podcast, the series featured outlandish and farcical humor, often delivered in a deadpan manner. The mock talk show derived most of its comedy from its surreal spoofs of common late night tropes and from its characters' ineptitude.

On August 18, 2016, Aukerman announced that the series would end after season 5, and the finale aired on December 2, 2016.

== Production ==
The show featured celebrity guests playing either themselves or characters. Many of these celebrities were previous guests on the Comedy Bang! Bang! podcast and revisited characters such as Don Dimello (Andy Daly), El Chupacabra (Nick Kroll), Bob Ducca (Seth Morris), Lil' Gary (Thomas Lennon), Huell Howser (James Adomian) and Cake Boss (Paul F. Tompkins). Many frequent collaborators included former Mr. Show with Bob and David cast members such as Paul F. Tompkins, Bob Odenkirk, and David Cross.

Reggie Watts was the show's "one-man bandleader" until halfway through the fourth season, when he quit. A few weeks later, he was offered the job of bandleader for The Late Late Show with James Corden. Musician Kid Cudi took over bandleader and sidekick duties on Comedy Bang! Bang! after Watts' departure. The season four finale aired on December 10, 2015, and was Cudi's final episode. The series was renewed for a 20-episode fifth season on May 5, 2015. "Weird Al" Yankovic took over the position of bandleader for the fifth season, which premiered on June 3, 2016.

The talk show took place in one-third of a wooden shack with modern decorations, surreal pop-art, taxidermy, old books without dust-covers, and houseplants. Various objects had the ability to talk including the taxidermy, houseplants, as well as a couch named Sir Couchley.

== Episodes ==
Season	Episodes	Originally released	
Season	Episodes	First released	Last released
1	10	June 8, 2012	August 10, 2012
2	20	July 12, 2013	December 20, 2013
3	20	May 8, 2014	December 19, 2014
4	40	January 9, 2015	December 10, 2015
5	20	June 3, 2016	December 2, 2016

== Reception ==
Critical reception for Comedy Bang! Bang! was generally mixed to positive, with a rating of 67 on Metacritic. Most television critics gave the show positive reviews. Paste reviewer Ross Bonaime called the show "one of the best written shows on TV today", comparing it to Pee-wee's Playhouse. Los Angeles Times television reviewer Robert Lloyd has called the show "amusing", likening it to Space Ghost Coast to Coast. Additionally, the weekly reviews that were posted on The A.V. Club were generally in the B− to A range.

== Home media ==
Comedy Bang! Bang! Season 1 was released on Region 1 DVD on January 21, 2014. The two-disc set consists of all 10 episodes of its first season. Special features include: deleted and extended scenes, full-length alternate celebrity interviews and audio commentaries featuring characters from the show and more.

Comedy Bang! Bang! Season 2 was released on Region 1 DVD on June 24, 2014. The four-disc set consists of all 20 episodes of its second season. Special features include: full episode commentaries, deleted/bonus scenes and interviews, Reggie's season 2 music supercut, VFX tests and more.
