= Ian Roberts (American actor) =

American actor, comedian and writer (born 1965)

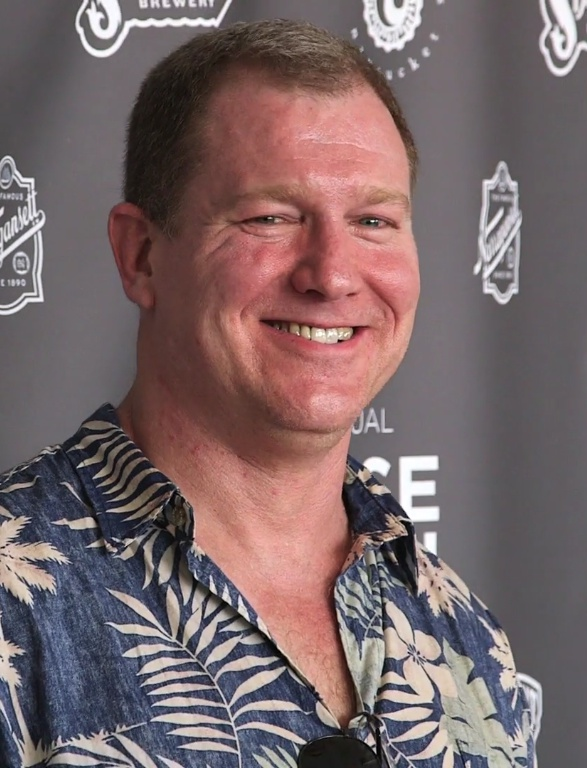
- Roberts in 2015
- Born: Ian Michael Roberts; July 29, 1965 (age 61); Queens, New York, U.S.
- Education: Grinnell College
- Occupations: Actor; comedian; writer
- Years active: 1990–present
- Spouse: Katie Roberts
- Children: 2

Ian Michael Roberts (born July 29, 1965) is an American actor, comedian, writer, and a founding member of the Upright Citizens Brigade improv and sketch comedy troupe.

== Life and career ==
Roberts was born in Queens, New York to parents Don and Penny Roberts, but spent most of his childhood in Secaucus, New Jersey, where he moved at age four. In 1987 he graduated from Grinnell College in Iowa, where he majored in theater. He moved to Milwaukee and eventually to Chicago where he became involved in improvisational comedy, studying under comedy legend Del Close.

In the early 1990s, Roberts and Matt Besser (along with several other Chicago improv comics) formed the Upright Citizens Brigade sketch comedy troupe. Amy Poehler and Matt Walsh later joined them, forming the UCB foursome who went on to create their own Comedy Central series and open the affiliated Upright Citizens Brigade Theatre in New York and Los Angeles, well-known venues for live alternative comedy and improv where many other comics have launched their careers.

Roberts wrote and starred in the limited release film Martin & Orloff, and had supporting roles in films such as Anchorman: The Legend of Ron Burgundy, Bring It On, Talladega Nights: The Ballad of Ricky Bobby, Drillbit Taylor, Reno 911!: Miami and Semi-Pro. On the Upright Citizens Brigade's sketch series on Comedy Central, he was often seen as UCB Agent Antoine, and portrayed other sketch characters such as Steve Youngblood and Astronaut Mike Birchwood. A running joke on the sketch series was that his character (Agent Antoine) was thought by the other UCB Agents (Colby, Trotter, Adair) to be a cyborg despite his constant assertions to the contrary.

Roberts, along with his other UCB castmates, has appeared in sketch comedy segments on Late Night with Conan O'Brien for many years. He also had a recurring character in the sitcom Arrested Development, Dr. Fishman (AKA The Literal Doctor, AKA Dr. Wordsmith), and returned for several episodes for the show's revived 4th season on Netflix in 2013.

Circa 2002, he voice-acted in Home Movies, a largely improvised cartoon that has developed a cult following. His character, Tom Wilsonberg, featured in the episode "Stowaway," was an entrepreneur with a gambling addiction and eccentric behavior.

Roberts was one of the additions to the cast of Reno 911! in its final season, as Sgt. Jack Declan. In 2010 he starred with UCB partner Matt Walsh in the Spike TV improvised comedy series Players, created by Walsh, where starred as brothers who ran a sports bar. Roberts and Walsh also directed several episodes. It ran one season, concluding on August 14, 2010.

In September 2010, Roberts appeared with Conan O'Brien in commercials promoting O'Brien's new TBS show. Roberts played the captain of the "Conan Blimp", with O'Brien as a passenger.

Roberts has written several screenplays with writing partner Jay Martel, one of which was recently sold to DreamWorks. They wrote the script for the comedy Get Hard, starring Will Ferrell and Kevin Hart. They were also showrunners for all five seasons of the Comedy Central sketch series Key & Peele. They were executive producers and showrunners of the 2016 TV Land series Teachers.

In 2025, Roberts was a writer on the Tubi series The Z Suite, which starred Lauren Graham and Nico Santos.

== Personal life ==
Roberts lives in Agoura Hills, California, with his wife Katie and their two children, Declan and Josie.

== Selected filmography ==
Actor

- Upright Citizens Brigade (1998–2000), Antoine/Various
- Bring It On (2000), Sparky Polastri
- Anchorman: The Legend of Ron Burgundy (2004), Stage Manager
- Arrested Development (6 episodes, 2005–2013), The Literal Doctor
- Talladega Nights: The Ballad of Ricky Bobby (2006), Kyle
- Walk Hard: The Dewey Cox Story (2007), Drug Dealer
- Semi-Pro (2008), Spurs Coach
- Drillbit Taylor (2008), Jim
- Step Brothers (2008), Male Therapist
- I Love You, Man (2009), Venice Boardwalk Jogger
- Reno 911! (main cast, 2009), Sergeant Jack Declan
- Parks and Recreation (2 episodes, 2009–2010), Ian Winston
- Players (main cast, 2010), Ken Fitzgerald
- Workaholics (1 episode, 2011), Cal
- Key & Peele (2 episodes, 2012–2013)
- Hate Crime, Three
- Community (1 episode, 2013), Coach Jason Chapman
- Brooklyn Nine-Nine (1 episode, 2014), Lucas Wint
- Drunk History (1 episode, 2014), James Madison
- Playing House (5 episodes, 2014–2017), Ian
- Review (1 episode, 2015), Cassius
- Freaks of Nature (2015), Chaz Sr.
- Teachers (1 episode, 2016), Superintendent Greg
- The House (2017), Driver at College Campus

Writer

- Upright Citizens Brigade (1998–2000)
- Key & Peele (2012–2015)
- Get Hard (2015)
- Teachers (2016)
- Craig of the Creek (2018)
- The Z-Suite (2025)
