= The Meltdown with Jonah and Kumail =

American stand-up comedy TV series

- Genre: Stand-up comedy
- Starring: Jonah Ray; Kumail Nanjiani
- Opening theme: "Vizcaya" by Jacuzzi Boys
- Country of origin: United States
- Original language: English
- No. of seasons: 3
- No. of episodes: 24

Production
- Executive producers: Stuart Confield; Ben Stiller; Deborah Liebling; Kumail Nanjiani; Jonah Ray; Emily V. Gordon; Mike Rosenstein
- Producer: Inman Young
- Production companies: Comedy Partners; Red Hour Television; Literally Figurative, Inc.; Johnny Videogames

Original release
- Network: Comedy Central
- Release: July 24, 2014 – November 22, 2016

The Meltdown with Jonah and Kumail is an American stand-up comedy television series hosted by Jonah Ray and Kumail Nanjiani that aired on Comedy Central. It was filmed in the Nerdist Showroom at Meltdown Comics in Los Angeles. It is based on a weekly live show that began in 2010. On July 24, 2014, an edited version began airing on Comedy Central consisting of eight episodes.

On February 17, 2015, Comedy Central announced that it had picked up The Meltdown for a second season. On November 20, it was renewed for a third season. On September 23, 2016, it was announced that the third season would be the last, due to Ray and Nanjiani ending the live show.

== Episodes ==
=== Series overview ===
Season	Episodes	Originally released	
Season	Episodes	First released	Last released
1	8	July 24, 2014	September 18, 2014
2	8	June 30, 2015	August 18, 2015
3	8	September 27, 2016	November 22, 2016

=== Season 1 (2014) ===
No.	Title	Guests	Original release date	Viewers (millions)
1	"The One with the Childhood Crushes"	Steve Agee, David Koechner, Neal Brennan, Moshe Kasher, appearance by Adam Scott	July 24, 2014	N/A
2	"The One with the Party Fouls"	Emily Heller, Eugene Mirman, Jon Daly, Nick Offerman, T.J. Miller	July 31, 2014	N/A
3	"The One with the Worst Jobs"	Marc Maron, James Adomian, Chris Hardwick, Justin Willman	August 7, 2014	N/A
4	"The One with the Travel Stories"	Pete Holmes, Garfunkel And Oates, Brody Stevens, Rory Scovel	August 14, 2014	N/A
5	"The One with the TV Host Perks"	Jared Logan, John Hodgman, Todd Glass, "Weird Al" Yankovic	August 28, 2014	N/A
6	"The One with Betrayal"	Paul Scheer and Rob Huebel, Doug Benson, Jim Gaffigan, Eric Andre	September 4, 2014	N/A
7	"The One with the Wedding Stories"	Maria Bamford, Gabe Liedman and Jenny Slate, Michael Ian Black, Reggie Watts	September 11, 2014	N/A
8	"The One with the Horror Stories"	Tom Lennon, Adam Cayton-Holland, Tom Wilson, Kyle Kinane	September 18, 2014	N/A

=== Season 2 (2015) ===
No.	Title	Guests	Original release date	Viewers (millions)
1	"The One with the Replacement Hosts"	Andy Daly, Cameron Esposito, Hampton Yount, hosted by Abbi Jacobson and Ilana Glazer	June 30, 2015	N/A
2	"The One with the Jacket"	Sean Patton, Claudia O'Doherty, Matt Braunger, Adam Pally, Gil Ozeri	July 7, 2015	N/A
3	"The One with the Little Girl Named Lucy"	John Mulaney, Brent Weinbach, Brett Gelman	July 14, 2015	N/A
4	"The One with the Kiss"	Jak Knight, Kurt Braunohler, Thomas Middleditch, Bridget Everett	July 21, 2015	N/A
5	"The One with All the Spitting"	Nick Thune, Fred Armisen, John Early, Andrew Santino	July 28, 2015	N/A
6	"The One with the Clearance Issues"	Aparna Nancherla, Ron Funches, Al Madrigal, Chelsea Peretti	August 4, 2015	N/A
7	"The One Where Hannibal Looks Like Miami Vice"	Paul Scheer, Kate Berlant, Hannibal Buress	August 11, 2015	N/A
8	"The One with the Coco"	Joe Mande, Beth Stelling, Lauren Lapkus, Natasha Leggero	August 18, 2015	N/A

=== Season 3 (2016) ===
No.	Title	Guests	Original release date	Viewers (millions)
1	"The One with the Improv Troupe"	Brian Posehn, Jay Larson, Byron Bowers, Wild Horses (Lauren Lapkus, Mary Holland, Stephanie Allynne, and Erin Whitehead)	September 27, 2016	N/A
2	"The One with the Box of Pain"	Michelle Buteau, Paul F. Tompkins, David Wain, Brendon Small, Steve Agee	October 4, 2016	N/A
3	"The One with More Dicks"	Maria Bamford, the Lucas Brothers, Martha Kelly, the Five Footprints (Ron Funches, Joe DeRosa, Drennon Davis, and Rory Scovel)	October 11, 2016	N/A
4	"The One with the Hypnotic Herpes"	Solomon Georgio, Al Jackson, Jen Kirkman	October 18, 2016	N/A
5	"The One without Neil deGrasse Tyson"	Brandon Wardell, Sam Jay, Guy Branum	October 25, 2016	N/A
6	"The One with OCD"	Baron Vaughn, Ian Karmel, Rachel Bloom	November 1, 2016	N/A
7	"The One with Tiny"	Joel Kim Booster, River Butcher, Gelmania (Brett Gelman, John Gemberling, King Cyrus King)	November 15, 2016	N/A
8	"The One with Meltdown and a Murder"	Charla Lauriston, Brent Sullivan, Mike O'Brien, Todd Barry	November 22, 2016	N/A
