= List of The Champs episodes =

The Champs was a comedy podcast hosted by Neal Brennan, Moshe Kasher, and DJ Douggpound (Doug Lussenhop of the Tim and Eric Show). Guests on the podcast were almost exclusively black. It was part of the All Things Comedy podcast network.

== Episodes ==
=== 2011 ===
Release date	Guest/Title	Sources
August 6, 2011	Jerrod Carmichael	
August 10, 2011	Ian Edwards	
August 18, 2011	NBA Star Blake Griffin	
August 27, 2011	NBA Star Blake Griffin (part 2) and Comedian Leslie Jones	
September 6, 2011	Craig Robinson	
September 19, 2011	Donnell "Ashy Larry" Rawlings	
September 30, 2011	Tony Rock	
October 11, 2011	Robert Townsend	
October 21, 2011	David Alan Grier	
November 10, 2011	Erik Griffin (Workaholics)	
November 16, 2011	Adult Film's Lexington Steele	
November 24, 2011	Champsgiving: Hugh Moore	
December 1, 2011	Wayne Brady	
December 9, 2011	Eric André	
December 19, 2011	Byron Bowers	

=== 2012 ===
Release date	Guest/Title	Sources
January 11, 2012	The Robot	
January 19, 2012	Bobby Lee	
January 26, 2012	Owen Smith	
February 1, 2012	Conan's Deon Cole	
February 9, 2012	JB Smoove	
February 15, 2012	Alonzo Bodden (Last Comic Standing)	
February 24, 2012	Adult Film's Sasha Grey and Musician Flying Lotus	
March 2, 2012	Sasha Grey and Flying Lotus (Part 2)	
March 7, 2012	"Cutty" from The Wire - Chad Coleman	
March 15, 2012	Questlove	
March 22, 2012	Key (from Key & Peele)	
March 29, 2012	Hannibal Buress	
April 9, 2012	Jose Canseco	
April 17, 2012	Faizon Love ("Big Worm" from Friday)	
April 25, 2012	Baron Vaughn	
May 3, 2012	Suli McCullough	
May 16, 2012	Pras from The Fugees	
May 25, 2012	Felipe Esparza (Last Comic Standing Winner)	
June 6, 2012	Trevor Noah	
June 15, 2012	Roy Wood, Jr.	
June 25, 2012	Charlie Murphy	
July 4, 2012	Retta (From NBC's Parks & Rec)	
July 10, 2012	John Legend	
July 18, 2012	Ron Funches	
July 26, 2012	Blake Griffin Returns	
August 6, 2012	Lil Rel	
August 20, 2012	Maronzio Vance	
August 28, 2012	Nicole Richie	
September 5, 2012	Aziz Ansari	
September 12, 2012	Larry Wilmore	
September 19, 2012	Rusty Cundieff (Chappelle's Show Director)	
October 8, 2012	NBA Legend John Salley	
October 18, 2012	Anthony Anderson	
October 24, 2012	Russell Peters	
November 5, 2012	Riff Raff and Chelsea Peretti	
November 20, 2012	Shawn and Marlon Wayans	
November 30, 2012	Dwayne Perkins	
December 6, 2012	CNN and ESPN's LZ Granderson	
December 17, 2012	David Alan Grier Returns	

=== 2013 ===
Release date	Guest/Title	Sources
January 8, 2013	Mario Joyner	
January 15, 2013	Bashir and Diallo	
January 29, 2013	Kumail Nanjiani	
February 6, 2013	Too $hort	
February 21, 2013	Jasper Redd	
March 5, 2013	Aisha Tyler	
March 15, 2013	Ali LeRoi (co-creator of Everybody Hates Chris)	
March 20, 2013	Chris Rock	
April 17, 2013	Reggie Watts	
April 26, 2013	Godfrey	
May 6, 2013	Michael Che	
May 21, 2013	Lucas Brothers	
June 6, 2013	Allen Hughes (Director of Menace II Society and American Pimp)	
June 13, 2013	Jay Chandrasekhar	
July 3, 2013	Superhead	
July 11, 2013	NBA All-Star Baron Davis	
July 24, 2013	Kevin Avery	
August 5, 2013	Jermaine Fowler	
August 19, 2013	Jordan Peele (Key & Peele)	
September 3, 2013	busdriver	
September 12, 2013	Aries Spears	
October 18, 2013	Pootie Tang - Lance Crouther	
November 1, 2013	Roy Wood Returns	
November 13, 2013	Corey Holcomb	
November 21, 2013	Dean Edwards	
November 30, 2013	Felipe Esparza Returns	
December 13, 2013	Finesse Mitchell	
December 31, 2013	"Q", Founder of World Star Hip Hop	

=== 2014 ===
Release date	Guest/Title	Sources
January 10, 2014	MC Serch	
January 22, 2014	Big Daddy Kane	
January 29, 2014	Maseo from De La Soul	
February 5, 2014	Arsenio	
February 12, 2014	Action Bronson	
February 20, 2014	Charlamagne Tha God	
February 27, 2014	Wyatt Cenac	
March 13, 2014	Hot 97 DJ Cipha Sounds	
March 21, 2014	Daily Show writer Travon Free	
March 28, 2014	Hannibal Buress	
April 8, 2014	Russell Simmons	
April 17, 2014	Freddie Gibbs	
April 30, 2014	Cristela Alonzo	
May 26, 2014	SNL's Jay Pharoah	
June 4, 2014	George Wallace	
June 19, 2014	Jean Grae	
June 28, 2014	Pharaohe Monch	
July 9, 2014	Keith Robinson	
July 22, 2014	Marina Franklin	
August 21, 2014	Seaton Smith (From Fox's Mulaney)	
September 22, 2014	Golden State Warrior Harrison Barnes	
October 8, 2014	Affion Crockett	
October 20, 2014	Danny Brown	
November 4, 2014	Damon Wayans, Jr.	
November 24, 2014	King Bach	
December 4, 2014	Baratunde Thurston	

=== 2015-16 ===
Release date	Guest/Title	Sources
January 7, 2015	Tiffany Haddish	
January 20, 2015	Hari Kondabolu	
February 4, 2015	Black Thought (The Roots)	
February 20, 2015	Ms. Pat	
March 12, 2015	Jerrod Carmichael	
July 27, 2015	Wanda Sykes	
August 18, 2015	New Faces 2015: Selections from the Montreal JFL Festival	
August 30, 2015	Nicole Byer	
September 30, 2015	Jamar Neighbors	
February 28, 2016	Questlove (Champs Farewell)	
