= The Champs (podcast) =

Comedy podcast

- Genre: Comedy
- Language: English

Cast and voices
- Hosted by: Moshe Kasher; Neal Brennan; Doug Lussenhop

Production
- Length: Approx. 1-2 hours

Technical specifications
- Audio format: ITunes

Publication
- Original release: August 6, 2011 – February 28, 2016
- Provider: All Things Comedy

The Champs is a comedy podcast hosted by Neal Brennan, Moshe Kasher, and until 2013, DJ Douggpound (Doug Lussenhop of the Tim and Eric Show). It is part of the All Things Comedy podcast network.

Kasher said the following of the podcast in a 2011 interview with SanDiego.com: "It’s Doug dropping sound effects and beats over me, and Neal kind of hosting an hour of ridiculous chat. We have a rotating black guy guest; there’s a different black guest every week." Guests of the show have included actor/comedians Wayne Brady and David Alan Grier, as well as musician Questlove, adult film star Lexington Steele, and professional basketball player Blake Griffin. The show has strayed from its guest format on occasion with guests such as comedian and actor Bobby Lee, former pornographic actress Sasha Grey, former Major League Baseball player Jose Canseco, and actor Aziz Ansari. In 2014, The Champs was named "Best Podcast" as part of LA Weekly's "Best of L.A." issue.

The podcast ended on February 28, 2016, due to the difficulties of finding and scheduling guests in a timely manner. Questlove was the show's final guest.

== See also ==
- List of The Champs episodes
