= Moshe Kasher =

American comedian and writer (born 1979)

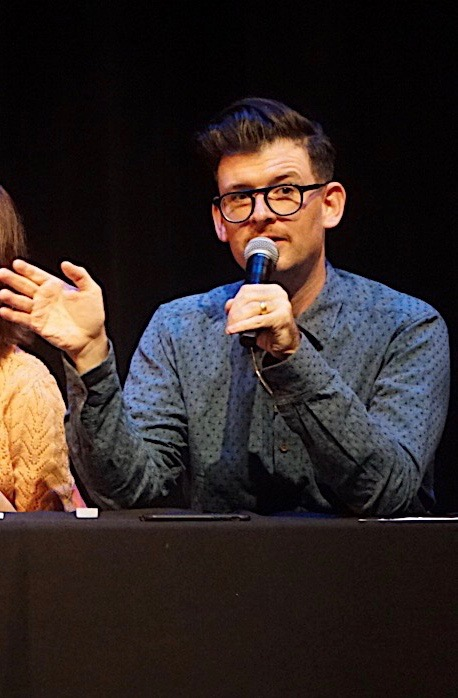
- Kasher at SF Sketchfest on January 25, 2020
- Born: Mark Moshe Kasher; July 6, 1979 (age 47); New York City, U.S.
- Education: University of California, Santa Barbara (BA)
- Spouse: Natasha Leggero (m. 2015)
- Children: 1

Comedy career
- Years active: 2001–present
- Medium: Stand-up, television, webcast
- Genres: Observational comedy, black comedy, surreal humor
- Subjects: Everyday life, Human sexuality, self-deprecation, religion, race, politics of the United States
- Website: moshekasher.com

Mark Moshe Kasher (born July 6, 1979) is an American stand-up comedian, writer and actor based in the Los Angeles area. He is the author of the 2012 memoir Kasher in the Rye: The True Tale of a White Boy from Oakland Who Became a Drug Addict, Criminal, Mental Patient, and Then Turned 16. In 2009, iTunes named Kasher "Best New Comic" and his comedy album Everyone You Know Is Going to Die, and Then You Are! was ranked one of the top 20 comedy albums on iTunes that same year. He was also named "Comic to Watch in 2010" by Punchline Magazine.

== Early life and education ==
Born in Queens, New York, Kasher moved to Oakland, California with his mother and brother when he was one year old. Kasher grew up in North Oakland's Temescal and Piedmont Avenue neighborhoods, and his family lived mostly on disability assistance and food stamps. A son of deaf parents, Kasher worked as a sign-language interpreter from the age of 17. His parents met at the World Games for the Deaf in 1967 and split up when Kasher was nine years old.

When Kasher was four years old, his father Steven, a former painter who was born to secular, communist Jewish parents, became a Hasidic Jew in the Satmar community in Brooklyn; Steven's grandfather, originally from Hungary, was a New Square Skverer Hasid. Kasher regularly spent summers with his father in Sea Gate, Brooklyn until his death — Kasher was 20 at the time. His father lived with Gaucher's disease. Kasher's brother is a rabbi.

In his autobiography Kasher in the Rye: The True Tale of a White Boy from Oakland Who Became a Drug Addict, Criminal, Mental Patient, and Then Turned 16, Kasher wrote about having been moved in and out of mental institutions from the age of four and using drugs from the ages of 12 to 16. He was kicked out of four different high schools. In an interview with SanDiego.com, Kasher described himself as "pretty straight edge," stating that he has been clean "since I was very young." He earned his G.E.D. at age 16 and later became a sign-language interpreter.

Kasher attended community college in the Bay Area, where he studied theater and wrote several long-form monologues. He later transferred to the University of California, Santa Barbara, where he graduated with a degree in religious studies and minored in Jewish studies. Before his career in comedy, Kasher had considered becoming a college professor in Jewish history.

In 2001, Kasher attended an open mic comedy night in New York which included a performance by Chelsea Peretti, a comedian and writer with whom Kasher had attended junior high school in Oakland. After seeing her perform, Kasher asked Peretti to take him along on future performances, offering to perform with her. For his first performance, she took him to an open mic at the Luggage Store Gallery in San Francisco.

== Career ==
=== Stand up ===
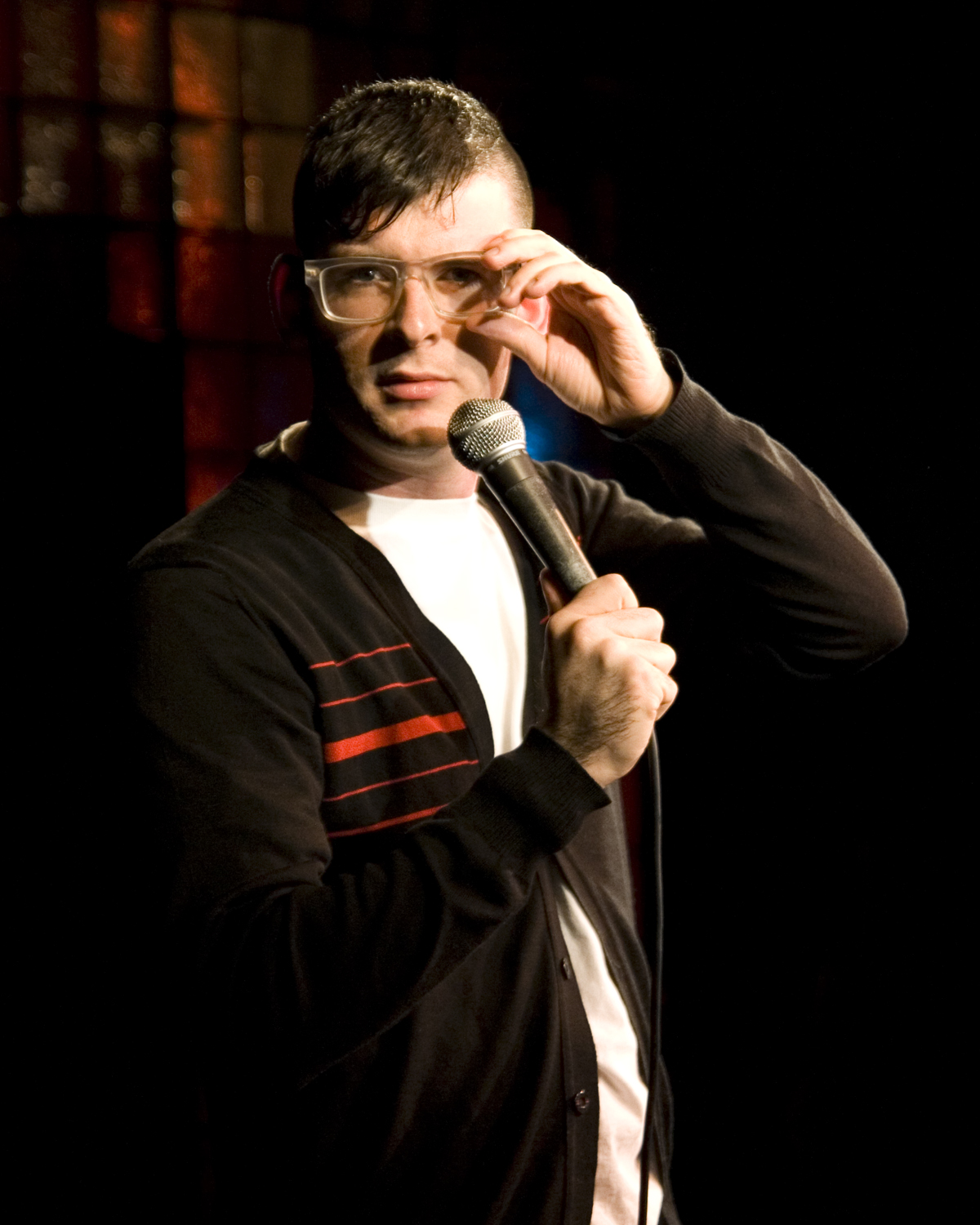
Kasher in 2010

In the early 2000s, Kasher performed mainly in the Bay Area, regularly performing at the Punch Line and Cobb's comedy clubs in San Francisco. In the mid to late 2000s, he participated in many comedy shows with fellow comedians Brent Weinbach and Alex Koll. In 2008 Kasher moved to Los Angeles.

2009 marked a significant year in Kasher's comedy career. He was named "Best of Fest" at that year's Aspen Rooftop Comedy Festival; his performance in Aspen garnered him an invitation to the Just For Laughs comedy festival in Montreal that same year. This was followed by an appearance on the Comedy Central series Live at Gotham. Kasher had also released his comedy album Everyone You Know Is Going to Die, and Then You Are! through Rooftop Comedy Productions in April 2009; near the year's end the album was deemed one of the top 20 comedy albums of 2009 on iTunes. Kasher was also recognized by iTunes as the Top New Comedy Artist of 2009.

Kasher's stand-up act has been featured on such television programs as Late Night with Jimmy Fallon in 2010 and John Oliver's New York Stand Up Show in 2011. He has appeared on Conan, Showtime's Larry Wilmore's Race, Religion & Sex. He has also appeared as a frequent panelist on Chelsea Lately.

Kasher has performed at festivals internationally. In addition to the aforementioned Rooftop Comedy Festival and Just For Laughs, in 2010, he appeared at Fun Fun Fun Fest and South By South West both held in Austin, Texas, as well as Cat Laughs in Kilkenny, Ireland, and the Sasquatch! Music Festival in George, Washington. In 2011 he appeared at the Melbourne Comedy Festival in Melbourne, Australia. Kasher has also attended SF Sketchfest in San Francisco, California on several occasions.

In addition to the iTunes awards in 2009, Kasher was named "Comic to Watch in 2010" by Punchline Magazine as well as "One of the Top 20 Jews In The Arts" by Shalom Life in 2011. John Wenzel of The Denver Post also ranked Kasher #2 on his list of the top 10 comedy shows he attended in the Denver area during 2011.

In January 2012, Kasher recorded his first solo comedy special for Netflix, Moshe Kasher: Live In Oakland at The New Parish nightclub in his hometown of Oakland.

In September 2016, Comedy Central ordered a talk show series to be written and hosted by Kasher, entitled Problematic, which premiered on April 18, 2017.

=== Writing ===
Kasher is a published playwright, writer, and author. While still in college, Kasher's long-form monologue "Look Before You Leap" was included in the literary collection Monologues For Men By Men: Volume Two published in 2003. In 2011 and 2012 he contributed several articles to Heeb magazine. In 2012, he published his autobiography Kasher in the Rye: The True Tale of a White Boy from Oakland Who Became a Drug Addict, Criminal, Mental Patient, and Then Turned 16 published by Hachette Book Group's Grand Central Publishing. He wrote an episode titled "Pardon Me" for the television show, The New Normal.

=== Acting ===
Kasher played small roles in the independent films Sorry, Thanks (2009) and Wish Makers of West Hollywood (2010). He appeared on episodes of the Fox sitcom Traffic Light in 2011 and the NBC sitcom Whitney in 2012. Kasher played the role of Ruben — a gay, deaf man who uses a wheelchair — in an episode of the U.S. television series Shameless which aired March 18, 2012.

=== Podcasts ===
In 2011, Kasher, along with Neal Brennan (co-writer of Chappelle's Show) and DJ Douggpound (Doug Lussenhop of Tim and Eric Nite Live!), started a podcast called The Champs. Kasher said the following of the podcast in a 2011 interview with SanDiego.com: "It's Doug dropping sound effects and beats over me and Neal kind of hosting an hour of ridiculous chat. We have a rotating black guy guest, there's a different black guest every week." Guests of the show included actor/comedians Wayne Brady and David Alan Grier, as well as musician Questlove, adult film star Lexington Steele and professional basketball player Blake Griffin. The show has strayed from its guest format on occasion with guests such as comedian and actor Bobby Lee, former pornographic actress Sasha Grey, former Major League Baseball player Jose Canseco, and actor Aziz Ansari. In 2014 The Champs was named "Best Podcast" as part of LA Weekly's "Best of L.A." issue. The podcast ended in 2016.

In October 2014, Kasher premiered a new podcast on the Nerdist Podcast Network. Hound Tall Discussion Series is a live monthly podcast that covers a single topic. It's "an hour long chat with an expert and a panel of comedians, they learn all there is to know about things". The first episode was about harems and the expert was Jillian Lauren, author of Some Girls, while Pete Holmes and Beth Stelling made up the comedic panel.

On 15 July 2019, The Endless Honeymoon Podcast co-hosted with his wife, Natasha Leggero, premiered on most platforms such as Apple, Spotify, Stitcher and YouTube.

In 2020, Moshe and his brother Rabbi David Kasher began their podcast Kasher vs. Kasher to explore life during the Coronavirus pandemic.

== Personal life ==
Kasher married fellow comedian Natasha Leggero, who converted to Judaism, in October 2015. The couple had a baby girl in February 2018.

== Filmography ==
- Sorry, Thanks (2009) (Andrew)
- Wish Makers of West Hollywood (2010) (waiter)
- Zoolander 2 (2016) (Chimney Sweep)

== Television ==
- Live at Gotham (2009), (himself - stand up)
- Chelsea Lately (2010–2014), (himself - panelist)
- Late Night with Jimmy Fallon (2010, 2012), (himself - stand up)
- John Oliver's New York Stand Up Show (2011), (himself - stand up)
- The Daily Habit (2011), (himself - panelist)
- Traffic Light (2011), (Spike)
- Whitney (2012), (waiter)
- Conan (2012), (himself - stand up)
- Shameless (2012), (Ruben)
- Transparent (2014), (Moshe Pfeffierman)
- Moshe Kasher: Live in Oakland (2012), (himself - stand up)
- Drunk History (2013), (Albert Parsons)
- @midnight (2013–2017), (himself)
- The Pete Holmes Show (2013), (himself - interview)
- Garfunkel and Oates (2014), (nurse Durst at a medical marijuana shop)
- Brooklyn Nine-Nine (2014), (Duncan Traub)
- The League (2014), (November)
- Another Period (2015), (Dr. Goldberg)
- Problematic with Moshe Kasher (2017), (himself)
- The Honeymoon Stand Up Special (2018), (himself)
- This Close (2018–2019) (Jacob)
- The Good Place (2018), (News Man)
- A Little Late with Lilly Singh (2020), (himself)
- Crowd Control (2025), (himself)
- The Pitt (2026), (Samuel Jacob)

== Bibliography ==
- "Look Before You Leap", a monologue included in the literary collection Monologues For Men By Men: Volume Two (2003)
- Kasher in the Rye: The True Tale of a White Boy from Oakland Who Became a Drug Addict, Criminal, Mental Patient, and Then Turned 16 (2012)
- Subculture Vulture: A Memoir in Six Scenes (2024)

== Discography ==
- Crowd Surfing Vol. 1 (Comedy Dynamics, 2020) Download/streaming
- The Honeymoon Stand Up Special w/ Natasha Leggero (Netflix, 2018) LP/streaming
- Moshe Kasher: Live In Oakland (Comedy Dynamics/Netflix, 2013) CD+DVD/download/streaming
- Everyone You Know Is Going to Die, and Then You Are! (Rooftop Comedy Productions, 2009) CD/download/streaming
