= Another Period =

Television series

- Genre: Period sitcom
- Created by: Natasha Leggero; Riki Lindhome
- Directed by: Jeremy Konner
- Starring: Lauren Ash; Michael Ian Black; Paget Brewster; Donna Lynne Champlin; Beth Dover; Brett Gelman; Lauren Flans; Christina Hendricks; Brian Huskey; Dave Koechner; Natasha Leggero; Riki Lindhome; Missi Pyle; Jason Ritter; David Wain; Armen Weitzman
- Theme music composer: Cyrus Ghahremani (as King Cyrus King)
- Composer: Eban Schletter
- Country of origin: United States
- Original language: English
- No. of seasons: 3
- No. of episodes: 32

Production
- Executive producers: Stuart Cornfeld; Jeremy Konner; Natasha Leggero; Debbie Liebling; Riki Lindhome; Mike Rosenstein; Ben Stiller
- Producers: Inman Young; Erin Owens
- Cinematography: Carl Herse
- Editors: Jessica Brunetto; Al LeVine; Neil Mahoney; Kevin Oeser; Kyle Reiter; Joe Stakun
- Running time: 21 minutes
- Production companies: Red Hour: Leggero/Lindhome Productions; Konner Productions

Original release
- Network: Comedy Central
- Release: June 23, 2015 – March 20, 2018

Another Period is an American period sitcom television series created by and starring Natasha Leggero and Riki Lindhome. It followed the lives of the Bellacourts, the first family of Newport, Rhode Island, at the turn of the 20th century. Lillian (Leggero) and Beatrice (Lindhome) played sisters "who care only about how they look, what parties they attend and becoming famous, which is a lot harder in 1902". It was intended to be a spoof on reality shows like Keeping Up with the Kardashians while roughly contemporaneous with Downton Abbey and satirizing many of the same themes of class and social standing.

The series was picked up for 10 episodes and debuted on Comedy Central on June 23, 2015. It was directed by Jeremy Konner, co-creator and writer of Drunk History. Ben Stiller's production company Red Hour produced. Leggero, Lindhome, and Konner also served as executive producers. The second season premiered on June 15, 2016. On May 23, 2016, it was renewed for a third season, which premiered on January 23, 2018. In November 2018, Comedy Central announced it canceled the series after three seasons.

== Cast ==
=== The House of Bellacourt ===
- Lillian Abigail Bellacourt, played by Natasha Leggero, is the second-eldest Bellacourt daughter, who is often seen wearing a tiara. After Charles Ponzi left her at the altar at age 11, "the height of a woman's sexual peak," she entered into a loveless marriage with Victor, with whom she has produced eight daughters, most of whom are named Susan. Lillian is smart and resourceful, but often falls victim to her own selfishness. Lillian consistently carries around her vicious chihuahua, Mayor Cutie, before killing the dog in a fit of rage. Following her deep depression when Laverne Fusselforth dies during their wedding ceremony and his grandson marries Hortense in the second-season finale, Lilian acquires a new chihuahua which she uses as a replacement Mayor Cutie.
- Beatrice Bellacourt, played by Riki Lindhome, is the youngest daughter. She is twin to Frederick, with whom she is involved in an incestuous relationship. Beatrice serves as the "ideal woman" of the turn of the century. Tall, rich, and slender, she is a talented singer with no interest in politics and no opinions of her own. She exhibits exceptional selfishness and sociopathic tendencies, attempting to murder people without empathy. She is an idiot savant, with flashes of scientific genius, and helps guest Albert Einstein solve the theory of relativity. She has several children, including a son whom she calls The Little Asshole. Since being sent away to a nunnery in the second-season finale by Frederick, Beatrice has lost romantic interest in him.
- Hortense Jefferson Library Bellacourt, played by Artemis Pebdani in the pilot episode, Lauren Ash in the remainder of the first season, Lauren Flans in the second season, and Donna Lynne Champlin in the third season, is the eldest Bellacourt child. Dodo and Commodore are both embarrassed by her unattractiveness, and "pray her life will be blessedly short." Hortense acts as a satire of the moderate bourgeoise feminist, calling for women's suffrage, and is a member of the Women's Temperance League as well as the Newport Association of Gal Spinsters (N.A.G.S.). Although Hortense is the most liberal character, she is as ruthless as any Bellacourt, exposing the family to ridicule when she sells their scandalous secrets to the press. In the second-season finale, Hortense married Bertram Harrison Fusselforth VII before their fiery automobile crash while on their honeymoon. Despite being reported dead, Hortense is revealed to have survived while ending up in a hospital as a Jane Doe, only to fully recover to confront Lillian and Beatrice upon learning they were going to give a speech before Congress in her stead.
- Lord Frederick Bellacourt, played by Jason Ritter, is the youngest child and the heir to the Bellacourt family fortune. He is the illiterate twin brother of Beatrice, with whom he is involved in an incestuous relationship. He lacks any semblance of ambition, as he appears simple-minded and his life consists of leisure activities. After being set to marry Celery Savoy, Frederick is arranged by the Commodore to be a Senator and then future Vice President of the United States under Theodore Roosevelt.
- Commodore Bellacourt (originally Harold Bellawitz, a fur trapper), played by David Koechner, is the family patriarch and "magnet magnate." Often away on business, he avoids his family when he is home. After disowning Lillian and Beatrice in the season one finale when their scandals are made public, the Commodore takes them back in order to have them annul their husbands and marry into rich families so that he can regain his fortune. He is left bankrupt when the marriages do not pan out, with Dodo buying the manor and banning him from the estate.
- Dorothea "Dodo" Bellacourt, played by Paget Brewster, is the wife of the Commodore and the mother of his first four children. She begins to suspect her husband is having an affair, and delves deeper into her pre-existing morphine addiction to cope. Her condition worsens as the series progresses, and she attempts to quit cold turkey after she forces herself upon the butler Peepers after drinking too much absinthe. In the second season, Dodo flees the Bellacourt estate and joins a nunnery upon finding out that the Commodore plans to have her institutionalized for giving away most of his fortune to charity. Dodo returns after the Commodore sends her divorce papers, the charity organizations she donated to revealed as fronts as she transferred the Bellacourt fortune to the abbey in her name. In the third season, Dodo becomes the sole owner of the Bellacourt estate and bans the Commodore from the premises.
- Victor Schmemmerhorn-Fish V, played by Brian Huskey, is a self-centered Bavarian married to Lillian who married into the Bellacourt family in order to "stack cash", but feels that he cannot live "on a husband's allowance." A closeted homosexual, he is in a secret relationship with Albert. In the second season, Victor agrees to have his marriage to Lillian annulled on the condition that he be allowed to continue living at the manor. In the third season, Victor is revealed to be the uncle of Adolf Hitler.
- Albert Downsy, Jr., played by David Wain, is married to Beatrice. A closeted homosexual, he is in a secret relationship with Victor. In the second season, Albert agrees to have his marriage to Beatrice annulled on the condition that he be allowed to continue living at the manor.
- Celery Savoy Bellacourt, played by Missi Pyle, is a socialite who becomes engaged to Frederick after his appointment to the United States Senate. But after her marriage to Frederick, Celery is disowned by the Savoy family following the Bellacourts' scandals being made public. She has since attempted to use Frederick as a means to regain her status.

=== Servants at Bellacourt Manor ===
- Peepers (formerly Mitchell P. Spiritwalker) played by Michael Ian Black, is the Bellacourt butler, who was adopted and raised by a Native American family as an infant. Though the Bellacourts take no notice of his efforts, Peepers is a stickler for perfect order and hopelessly devoted to the family to the point of killing Scoops LaPue and having feelings for Dodo. Peepers is also Blanche's legal guardian and has the ability to send her to an insane asylum at his discretion. In the second-season finale, Peepers helps Dodo with her plan to steal the Commodore's remaining fortune and temporarily moves to the abbey until Dodo buys the Bellacourt estate in her name.
- Celine/Chair, played by Christina Hendricks (Seasons 1–2), is a former prostitute who became the Commodore's secret mistress and bearing his unborn son. The Commodore arranges for Celine to become a servant at the manor, where Beatrice renames her "Chair". In the season one finale, making her move to acquire the Bellacourt fortune, Celine attempts to kill Dodo. But as she ended up making an enemy out of Blanche when arranging her to be sent to the asylum as revenge for a previous event, resulting with Celine ending up in a coma after being pushed down the stairs. In the second season, regaining consciousness after giving birth to the Commodore's son Kermit, Celine eventually regains her memories and use of her legs while convincing the Commodore to divorce Dodo and marry her. But Celine leaves the Commodore upon him becoming bankrupt.
- Blanche, played by Beth Dover, is the head housemaid. She was diagnosed with hysteria as a nervous disorder and spent time in an asylum, feeling slighted that she was the only patient left unraped by the orderlies. She is easily startled from the experiences she did have there. Following being institutionalized by Celine, later causing her coma, Blanche reveals she got pregnant by one of the orderlies. She is then married by Mr. Peepers to Dr. John Goldberg before giving birth to her son Murry, whom she later has take place of Kermit as she spirits the Bellacourt baby away.
- Garfield Leopold McGillicutty, played by Armen Weitzman, is the under butler/valet, manservant, and later potato scrubber who was taken by Peepers from the orphanage at age 5 to work in the manor. The Bellacourts are his only family and he loves them with a blind devotion, having known nothing else.
- Hamish Crassus, played by Brett Gelman, the foul, unkempt groundskeeper who tends to the grounds of the mansion and performs certain other "special" duties such as kidnapping, "re-conforming to heterosexuality training," and selling women into sexual slavery. While framed for the death of Scoops LaPue, Hamish is revealed to be the Commodore's half brother in season two and is later revealed to be Jewish.
- Flobelle, played by Alice Hunter (Seasons 2-), the new maid hired to replace chair. She is an open-minded woman.

=== Recurring characters ===
- Marquis de Sainsbury, played by Thomas Lennon.
- Eunice, played by Kate Micucci, is a member of N.A.G.S who lost use of her left eye following being attacked by Beatrice.
- Abortion Deb, played by Betsy Sodaro, is a member of N.A.G.S.
- Scoops LaPue, played by Brent Weinbach, is a reporter/columnist for Newport's Lookie Loo newspaper. In the first-season finale, LaPue is murdered by Mr. Peepers when he appears to have made the Bellacourt's scandals public in the Lookie Loo.
- Dr. Goldberg, played by Moshe Kasher, is a pansexual Jewish physician who lives on the Bellacourt estate initially to tend Albert while in his coma while having a fling with Victor. Later revealed to be Canadian, Goldberg marries Blanche in a loveless marriage to acquire citizen status.
- Father Black Donahue, played by Jemaine Clement (Seasons 2–3), is a Catholic priest of an abbey on the Bellacourt property who houses Dodo during season 2 and converts Beatrice while she is in the nunnery. Following Dodo stealing the Comodore's fortune, Donahue becomes Dodo's lover and accompanies her to the Bellacourt estate at the start of the 3rd season until he overstays his welcome and abuses Dodo's generosity.

=== Real-life characters ===
- Matt Besser as Leon Trotsky, Marxist revolutionary from Russia
- Jared Breeze as a young Adolf Hitler, Victor's gentle nephew, an artistic pacifist whose worldviews are affected by his visit to Newport.
- Cedric the Entertainer as Scott Joplin, composer of ragtime music
- Bebe Drake as Harriet Tubman, abolitionist and humanitarian
- Josh Fadem as Falling Charlie, AKA Charlie Chaplin, an entertainer known for his clumsy falling routine
- Kate Flannery as Anne Sullivan, interpreter for Helen Keller
- Rich Fulcher as Mark Twain, the famous author and adventurer
- Matt Gourley as Albert Einstein, a theoretical physicist who sees the brilliance of Beatrice
- Tim Heidecker as Andrew Carnegie, a steel magnate
- Billy Merritt as William Howard Taft, a politician aspiring to a position in the White House
- Mike O'Connell as Theodore Roosevelt, President of the United States
- Michael Welch as Franklin Delano Roosevelt, President of the United States
- Gil Ozeri as Harry Houdini, magician/illusionist called in by Lillian to conduct a seance to rid the manor of its ghosts
- Chris Parnell as psychologist Dr. Sigmund Freud, sent to vet Frederick for membership in the U.S. Senate
- Ravi Patel as Mohandas Gandhi, lawyer and political leader from India
- June Diane Raphael as Eleanor Roosevelt, niece of the current President and unofficially engaged to another distant cousin, Franklin
- Paul Scheer as artist Pablo Picasso
- Shoshannah Stern as Helen Keller, blind and deaf advocate for women
- Ben Stiller as Charles Ponzi, a businessman who was once engaged to Lillian and attempts to rekindle their relationship so he can con her family out of their fortune without any qualms. But he ends up being murdered by his Indian boy-servant Tabu.
- Stephen Tobolowsky as Thomas Edison, an inventor and pornographer
- Vincent Rodriguez III and Jimmy O. Yang as conjoined twins Chang and Eng Bunker

== Episodes ==
Season	Episodes	Originally aired	
Season	Episodes	First aired	Last aired
1	10	June 23, 2015	August 25, 2015
2	11	June 15, 2016	August 24, 2016
3	11	January 23, 2018	March 20, 2018

=== Season 1 (2015) ===
No. overall	No. in season	Title	Written by	Original release date	US viewers (millions)
1	1	"The Party of the Century"	Natasha Leggero & Riki Lindhome	June 23, 2015	0.615
Lillian (Natasha Leggero) and Beatrice (Riki Lindhome) prepare to entertain a Newport power broker, and new servant Celine (Christina Hendricks) adjusts to life at Bellacourt Manor and her impromptu name change: Chair. Guest stars include Shoshannah Stern as Helen Keller, Kate Flannery as Annie Sullivan, and Artemis Pebdani as Hortense Bellacourt (replaced by Lauren Ash in all subsequent episodes).
2	2	"Divorce"	Natasha Leggero & Riki Lindhome	June 30, 2015	0.704
Lillian and Beatrice brainstorm ways to rid themselves of their husbands. Frederick (Jason Ritter) gets courted by a wealthy divorcee. Garfield (Armen Weitzman) copes with a traumatic event. Jon Daly, Will Sasso and Jessica Chaffin guest star.
3	3	"Funeral"	Natasha Leggero & Riki Lindhome	July 7, 2015	0.411
Lillian and Beatrice hold a funeral for their husbands. Albert (David Wain) and Victor (Brian Huskey) try to build a new life together. Peepers (Michael Ian Black) confronts his heritage. Guest Stars: Lou Diamond Phillips, Rich Fulcher, Tim Heidecker and Moshe Kasher.
4	4	"Pageant"	Natasha Leggero & Riki Lindhome	July 14, 2015	0.289
Bellacourt Manor hosts the first beauty pageant that is for more than vegetables. Babies or women may also now enter which leads to a Bellacourt showdown. Peepers trains Chair in the art of servitude. Jack Black, Kate Micucci, Betsy Sodaro and Moshe Kasher guest star.
5	5	"Senate"	Guy Branum	July 21, 2015	0.611
The Commodore (David Koechner) returns home to Bellacourt Manor. Frederick prepares to become a US senator while Lillian and Beatrice sabotage a suffrage rally that is important to Hortense. Chris Parnell, Brian White, Kate Micucci, Betsy Sodaro and Nancy Friedrich guest star.
6	6	"Lillian's Birthday"	Jeremy Konner	July 28, 2015	0.435
An old flame pays Lillian a visit at the manor. Peepers becomes gravely ill but no one seems to notice. Hortense finds herself in a delicate condition. Exec Producer Ben Stiller guest stars as Charles Ponzi.
7	7	"Switcheroo Day"	Moshe Kasher	August 4, 2015	0.507
Lillian orchestrates her own kidnapping for press attention while Blanche (Beth Dover) and Peepers spend the day as members of the upper class. Rich Fulcher guest stars as Mark Twain.
8	8	"Dog Dinner Party"	Laura Krafft	August 11, 2015	0.421
Beatrice has a meltdown when Frederick brings home a fiancee -- Celery Savoy. Dodo (Paget Brewster) goes through morphine withdrawal. Missi Pyle guest stars.
9	9	"Reject's Beach"	Moshe Kasher	August 18, 2015	0.358
New friends invite Lillian to a beach party. Beatrice goes to Thomas Edison for forbidden experimentation. Blanche receives a mysterious letter from a factory. Meanwhile, Garfield tries to keep the family from falling apart. Rachel Blanchard, Stephen Tobolowsky and Jon Daly guest star.
10	10	"Modern Pigs"	Natasha Leggero & Riki Lindhome	August 25, 2015	0.548
Lillian and Beatrice race across Newport in a failed attempt to stop Fredrick's wedding to Celery Savoy, only for them to be banned from the Bellacourt estate by the Commodore when their family scandals have been made public on The Lookie Loo. While Peepers realizes Celine's intentions yet unable to act against her on the Commodore's order, he instead kills Scoops LaPue for being the apparent writer while framing Hamish (Brett Gelman) for the crime. Lillian and Beatrice decide to become famous. Missi Pyle guest stars.

=== Season 2 (2016) ===
No. overall	No. in season	Title	Written by	Original release date	US viewers (millions)
11	1	"Tubman"	Jen Statsky	June 15, 2016	0.434
Lillian and Beatrice are determined to be famous and enlist the help of Harriet Tubman. The Commodore finds out he is broke because Dodo has been sending his money to charity and wants to send her to go shopping for straitjackets. To solve his financial issues he decides to marry off Lillian and Beatrice again! Peepers is on a mission to retrieve Lillian and Beatrice and get them back to Bellacourt Manor on orders from The Commodore.
12	2	"Annulment"	Natasha Leggero & Riki Lindhome	June 22, 2016	0.385
Lillian and Victor fight for control of the Butternut Room, Beatrice helps Albert recover from the trauma of his hatchet attack, and Peepers hires a new hall boy.
13	3	"The Prince and the Pauper"	Natasha Leggero & Riki Lindhome	June 29, 2016	0.428
Lillian and Beatrice both try to woo a foreign prince, Blanche helps Chair reclaim her lost memories, and Hamish forms a bond with his prison cellmate.
14	4	"Trial of the Century"	Moshe Kasher	July 6, 2016	0.386
Illicit deals are made and old secrets resurface as Frederick presides over Hamish's trial for the murder of Scoops LaPue.
15	5	"Roosevelt"	Jeremy Konner	July 13, 2016	0.393
The Commodore tries to sell Frederick as a possible vice president, Beatrice and Eleanor Roosevelt hit it off, and Flobelle organizes a servants' strike.
16	6	"Servants' Disease"	Krister Johnson	July 20, 2016	0.428
Lillian gets close to the servants when a typhoid outbreak wreaks havoc in the lower quarters, and Beatrice goes on a double date with her new boyfriend.
17	7	"Harvard"	Natasha Leggero & Riki Lindhome	July 27, 2016	0.403
Albert Einstein visits the manor and develops an unlikely partnership with Beatrice, and Lillian goes on a mission to find sex for pleasure.
18	8	"Joplin"	Moshe Kasher	August 3, 2016	0.384
Scott Joplin visits the manor to produce a song for Lillian and Beatrice, Blanche enjoys her new marriage to Dr. Goldberg, and Peepers struggles with sexual frustration.
19	9	"Lillian's Wedding"	Natasha Leggero & Riki Lindhome	August 10, 2016	0.36
Lillian prepares to marry an elderly media magnate, Frederick finds himself embroiled in a scandal, and Beatrice learns the ins and outs of Christianity.
20	10	"The Duel"	Jeremy Konner	August 17, 2016	0.365
Lillian despairs in the aftermath of her disastrous wedding, Dodo returns to Bellacourt, and Beatrice throws herself into her new religious calling.
21	11	"Lillian Is Dead"	Natasha Leggero & Riki Lindhome & Jeremy Konner	August 24, 2016	0.445
The Commodore faces some hard truths about his finances, Blanche goes into labor, and Lillian goes on an epic drinking binge.

=== Season 3 (2018) ===
No. overall	No. in season	Title	Written by	Original release date	US viewers (millions)
22	1	"Congress"	Jeremy Konner	January 23, 2018	0.272
Lillian and Beatrice take up Hortense's mantle to begin fighting for women's rights, and Peepers bristles at Father Black Donahue's new role at the manor.
23	2	"Séance"	Moshe Kasher	January 30, 2018	0.298
Everyone at Bellacourt Manor catches ghost fever when Harry Houdini visits to investigate some supernatural occurrences.
24	3	"Olympics"	Natasha Leggero & Riki Lindhome	February 6, 2018	0.274
Victor and Lillian square off after the Olympics allows women to compete, and Frederick and Beatrice question their relationship after Frederick discovers that he was adopted. Guest starring Thomas Lennon.
25	4	"The Love Boat"	Natasha Leggero & Riki Lindhome	February 13, 2018	0.254
Lillian and Beatrice fight over a sexy Spanish meteorologist, and a boat trip provides an opportunity for Dodo and Peepers to rekindle their illicit romance. Guest starring Marc Evan Jackson and Gilles Marini.
26	5	"Masquerade"	Natasha Leggero & Riki Lindhome	February 20, 2018	0.264
Garfield tries in vain to assert his authority as the new head butler, and Lillian and Beatrice sneak into Celery Savoy's masquerade ball.
27	6	"Shady Acres"	Jeremy Konner	February 27, 2018	0.29
Beatrice has an existential crisis, Lillian tries to scheme her way into landing a plot at an exclusive cemetery, and Frederick runs for president.
28	7	"Sex Nickelodeon"	Natasha Leggero & Riki Lindhome	March 6, 2018	0.324
When a naughty movie featuring Beatrice leaks, she finds herself at the center of a media frenzy; meanwhile, Victor and Albert become policemen.
29	8	"Lucky Chang's"	David Parker	March 13, 2018	0.296
Dodo subjects Beatrice to a harrowing beauty regimen as part of a campaign to get her face on the new nickel, and Lillian develops a gambling addiction.
30	9	"Little Orphan Garfield"	Michael Ian Black	March 13, 2018	0.167
Hortense helps Beatrice find her mystery lover, Lillian adjusts to life in the insane asylum, and Garfield searches for his birth parents.
31	10	"Commodore Returns"	Natasha Leggero & Riki Lindhome	March 20, 2018	0.234
The Commodore enlists Peepers to help him win Dodo back, Lillian's alliance with Blanche takes a turn, and Beatrice and Frederick plan to meet their beloveds.
32	11	"President Bellacourt"	Natasha Leggero & Riki Lindhome & Michael Ian Black	March 20, 2018	0.182
Frederick's presidential bid divides Bellacourt Manor, and Lillian struggles with her new life as a police officer's wife.

== Ratings ==
=== Season 1 (2015) ===
Viewership and ratings per episode of Another Period
No.	Title	Air date	Rating/share (18–49)	Viewers (millions)
1	"Pilot"	June 23, 2015	0.33	0.615
2	"Divorce"	June 30, 2015	0.39	0.704
3	"Funeral"	July 7, 2015	0.21	0.411
4	"Pageant"	July 14, 2015	0.16	0.289
5	"Senate"	July 21, 2015	0.34	0.611
6	"Lillian's Birthday"	July 28, 2015	0.22	0.435
7	"Switcheroo Day"	August 4, 2015	0.25	0.507
8	"Dog Dinner Party"	August 11, 2015	0.24	0.421
9	"Reject's Beach"	August 18, 2015	0.19	0.358
10	"Modern Pigs"	August 25, 2015	0.31	0.548

=== Season 2 (2016) ===
Viewership and ratings per episode of Another Period
No.	Title	Air date	Rating/share (18–49)	Viewers (millions)
1	"Tubman"	June 15, 2016	0.21	0.434
2	"Annulment"	June 22, 2016	0.21	0.385
3	"The Prince and the Pauper"	June 29, 2016	0.24	0.428
4	"Trial of the Century"	July 6, 2016	0.21	0.386
5	"Roosevelt"	July 13, 2016	0.23	0.393
6	"Servants' Disease"	July 20, 2016	0.21	0.428
7	"Harvard"	July 27, 2016	0.19	0.403
8	"Joplin"	August 3, 2016	0.18	0.384
9	"Lillian's Wedding"	August 10, 2016	0.2	0.360
10	"The Duel"	August 17, 2016	0.2	0.365
11	"Lillian Is Dead"	August 24, 2016	0.24	0.445

=== Season 3 (2018) ===
Viewership and ratings per episode of Another Period
No.	Title	Air date	Rating/share (18–49)	Viewers (millions)
1	"Congress"	January 23, 2018	0.14	0.272
2	"Séance"	January 30, 2018	0.12	0.298
3	"Olympics"	February 6, 2018	0.13	0.274
4	"The Love Boat"	February 13, 2018	0.13	0.254
5	"Masquerade"	February 20, 2018	0.12	0.264
6	"Shady Acres"	February 28, 2018	0.13	0.29
7	"Sex Nickelodeon"	March 6, 2018	0.16	0.324
8	"Lucky Chang's"	March 13, 2018	0.14	0.296
9	"Little Orphan Garfield"	March 13, 2018	0.06	0.167
10	"Commodore Returns"	March 20, 2018	0.1	0.234
11	"President Bellacourt"	March 20, 2018	0.07	0.182
