= Fenslerfilm =

American video production company

Fenslerfilm (stylized as FENSLERFILM) is an American video production company, based in Chicago, Illinois, United States, and headed by Eric Fensler.

== Work ==
=== G.I. Joe PSA spoofs ===
The company gained a reputation in 2003 for a series of short films which parodied the public service announcement (PSA) safety messages used at the end of every episode of the 1980s G.I. Joe animated series, based on Hasbro's toy line. Fensler, a fan of the series, had recalled the PSAs after rewatching G.I. Joe: The Movie which had included the PSAs as bonus features on its DVD, and played around with the footage. While Fensler did the video editing, he had friends supply the new voice-over lines. Fensler's friend Doug Lussenhop helped Fensler to prepare the parody PSAs for screening at the Heaven Gallery in Chicago, after which gallery visitors got VHS copies of the PSAs, while the gallery uploaded them to their website. The traffic from the popularity of the videos crashed the gallery's server, and eventually two other websites, eBaum's World and Heavy.com, provided copies of the videos. By 2004, the videos had been considered viral hits, and Hasbro had sent Fensler a cease and desist order. One of the more recognized of the parody PSAs involved Blowtorch arriving to help stop a kitchen fire started by two boys, randomly shouting "Porkchop sandwiches!" on his appearance. The catchphrase became part of unofficial merchandise based on the parody PSAs.

=== Other work ===
Fenslerfilm also did some Sealab 2021 TV spots for Adult Swim. The spots mirrored the previous G.I. Joe PSAs in tone and execution, as they were animated and dubbed in a similar fashion. In 2004, Lussenhop successfully applied to write for Tom Goes to the Mayor, created by Tim Heidecker and Eric Wareheim, and became one of their close collaborators. When Heidecker and Wareheim were preparing their next show, Tim and Eric Awesome Show, Great Job!, Lussenhop convinced them to bring on Fensler. Fensler stayed on for the show's five seasons, and continued to collaborate on the team's ongoing smaller projects. In addition, Fensler contributed music videos for the songs "Don't Mess With Illinois", "Hand Over Fist" and "Special Effect" by his fellow Chicagoans, electronic music group TRS-80. He also produced a music video for Daniel Johnston's song "The Monster Inside of Me", using footage from the Captain America animated series from the 1960s. As of 2013, Fensler works for the advertising firm Wieden+Kennedy.

== In popular culture ==
- In the movie tie-in video game, G.I. Joe: The Rise of Cobra, the developers Double Helix Games had planned to include the line "Porkchop Sandwiches" from one of Fensler's films as an exclamation, and had every voice actor record that line for its use. However, Hasbro rejected its use, citing the need to avoid damaging pending lawsuits.
- Super7 released a pair of figures in their ReAction toyline, "Body Massage Roadblock" and "I'm A Computer Mutt", directly based on the parody PSAs.
- The second-season episode "Hate Floats" of the animated series The Venture Bros features the character Henchman 21 wearing a "porkchop sandwiches" shirt while out of uniform.
- Weezer's "Pork and Beans" music video, which features stars of internet viral videos, contains a scene in which young animated versions of the band are seen listening to G.I. Joe member Gung-Ho.
- In the first issue of G.I. Joe: Storm Shadow by Devil's Due Publishing, Storm Shadow makes a reference to porkchop sandwiches.
- In Duke Nukem Forever, after killing pig cops, occasionally Duke will say "Porkchop Sandwiches!". He will also utter the phrase "Body Massage!" after grabbing a vibrator in the Titty City level.
