= Samuel Little =

American serial killer (1940–2020)

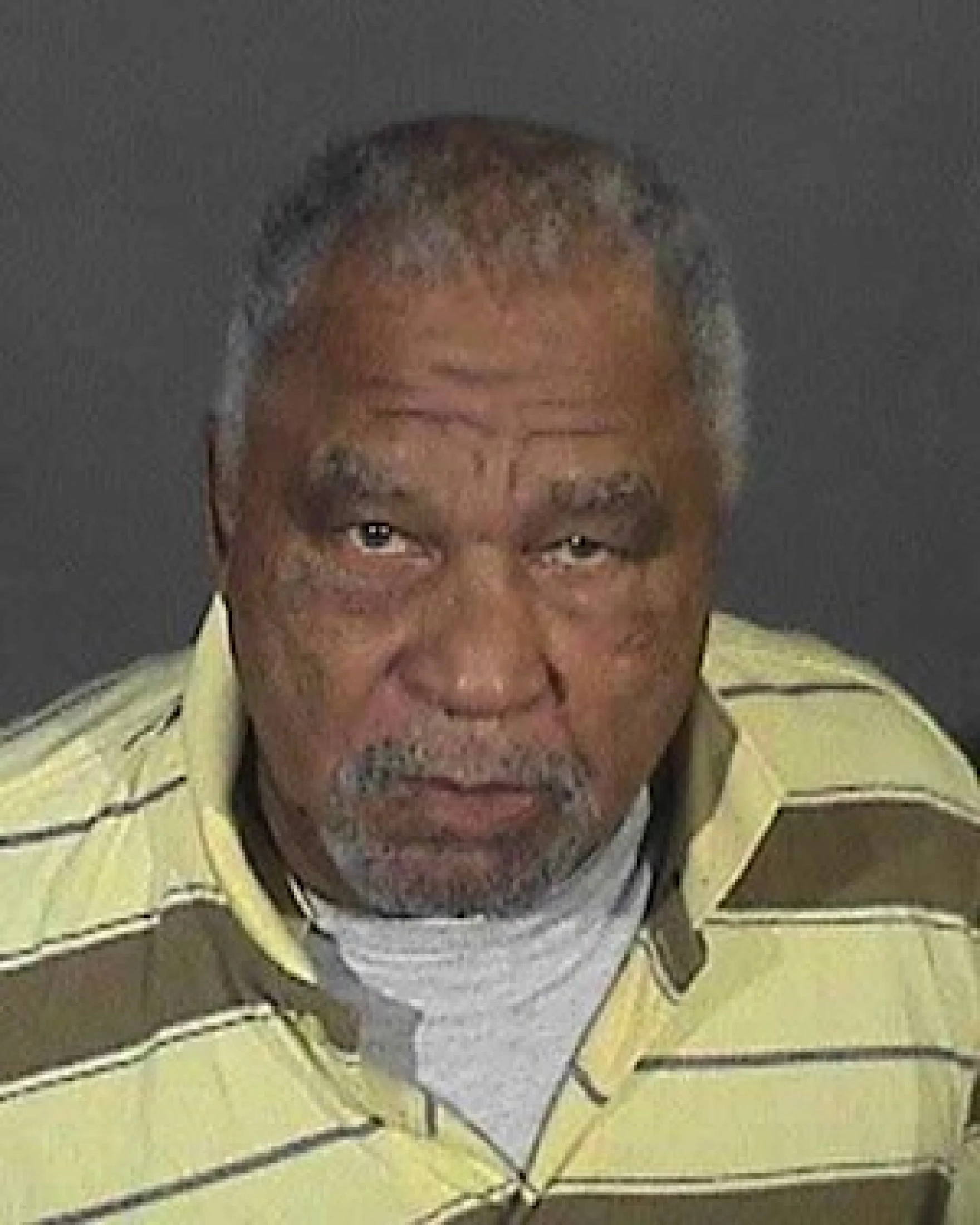
- Little in 2012
- Born: Samuel McDowell; June 7, 1940; Reynolds, Georgia, U.S.
- Died: December 30, 2020 (aged 80); Los Angeles County, California, U.S.
- Other names: Samuel McDowell; The Choke-and-Stroke Killer; Mr. Sam
- Known for: Being the most prolific serial killer in United States history by number of confirmed victims
- Conviction: Murder (8 counts)
- Penalty: 3 consecutive life sentences without the possibility of parole

Details
- Victims: 60–93+
- Span of crimes: 1970 – 2005 (confirmed); 1960–2012 (possible)
- Country: United States
- States: California, Texas, and Ohio (convicted); Sixteen others (accused)
- Date apprehended: September 5, 2012

Samuel Little (né McDowell; June 7, 1940 – December 30, 2020) was an American serial killer who was convicted of 8 murders and confessed to committing 93 murders, across 19 states, between 1970 and 2005. The FBI's Violent Criminal Apprehension Program has confirmed his involvement in at least 60 murders, the largest number of confirmed victims for any serial killer in American history. Little provided sketches for 26 of his victims, although not all have been linked to known murders. His crime spree stretched across the country, with a concentration of murders in Miami and Los Angeles.

== Early life ==
Little was born Samuel McDowell on June 7, 1940, in Reynolds, Georgia. The census from the year Little was born said his mother, Bessie Mae, worked as a maid and that his father was 19-year-old Paul McDowell. Little said that his teenaged mother was a "lady of the night", and that she abandoned him as an infant. Soon after his birth, Little's family moved to Lorain, Ohio, where he was brought up mainly by his grandmother. He attended Hawthorne Junior High School. By his own account, he began having sexual fantasies about strangling women as a child, starting when he saw his kindergarten teacher touch her neck; as a teenager, he collected true crime magazines depicting the strangulation of women.

In 1956, after being convicted of breaking and entering into property in Omaha, Nebraska, Little was held in an institution for juvenile offenders. His mother was listed on the booking card as "whereabouts unknown." Little moved to Florida to live with his mother in the late 1960s. By his own account, he was working at various times as a cemetery worker and an ambulance attendant. He said he then "began traveling more widely and had more run-ins with the law," being arrested in eight states for crimes that included driving under the influence, fraud, shoplifting, solicitation, armed robbery, aggravated assault, and rape. Little took up boxing during his time in prison, referring to himself as a former prizefighter.

== Crimes ==
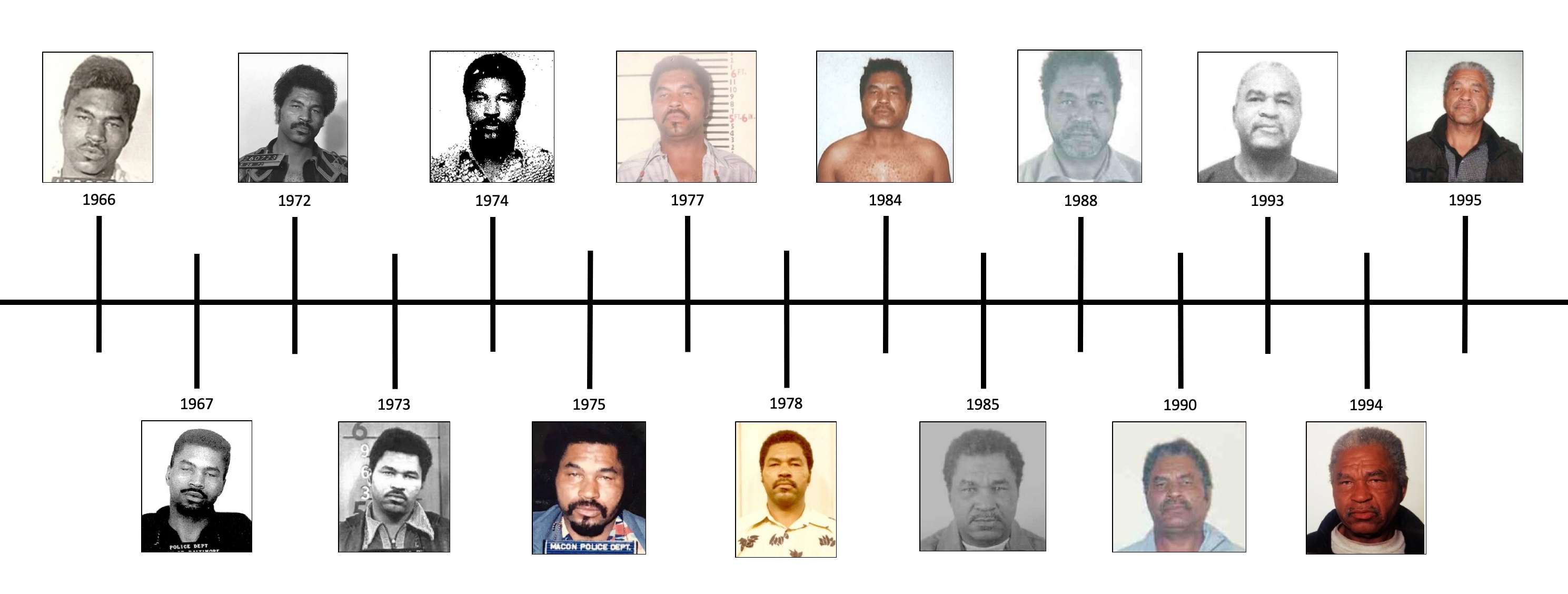
Timeline of Little's mugshots, 1966–1995

In 1961, Little was sentenced to three years in prison for breaking into a furniture store in Lorain; he was released in 1964. By 1975, he had been arrested 26 times in eleven states for crimes including theft, assault, attempted rape, fraud, and attacks on government officials.

In 1982, Little was arrested in Pascagoula, Mississippi, and he faced charges for the murder of 22-year-old Melinda Rose LaPree, who had gone missing in September of that year. A grand jury declined to indict him for her murder. However, while under investigation, Little was extradited to Florida and tried for the murder of 26-year-old Patricia Ann Mount, whose body had been found in September 1982. Prosecution witnesses identified Little in court as a person who had spent time with Mount on the night before her disappearance. Out of mistrust of witness testimonies, Little was acquitted in January 1984.

Little moved to California, where he stayed in the vicinity of San Diego. In October 1984, he was arrested for kidnapping, beating, and strangling 22-year-old Laurie Barros, who survived. One month later, he was found by police in the back seat of his car with an unconscious woman, also beaten and strangled, in the same location as the attempted murder of Barros. Little served two and a half years in prison for both crimes. Upon his release in February 1987, he immediately moved to Los Angeles and committed at least 10 additional murders.

Little was arrested on September 5, 2012, at Wayside Christian homeless shelter in Louisville, Kentucky, and extradited to California to face a narcotics charge, after which authorities used DNA testing to establish that he was involved in the murders of Linda Alford, killed on July 13, 1987, Audrey Nelson Everett, killed on August 14, 1989, and Guadalupe Duarte Apodaca, killed on September 3, 1989. All three women were killed and later found on the streets of Los Angeles. He was extradited to Los Angeles, where he was charged on January 7, 2013. A few months later, the police said that Little was being investigated for involvement in three dozen murders committed in the 1980s, which until then had been undisclosed. In connection with the new circumstances, in Mississippi, the LáPree murder case was reopened. In total, Little was tested for involvement in 93 murders of women in many states.

== Trial and incarceration ==
Little was tried for the murders of Alford, Nelson, and Apodaca in September 2014. The prosecution presented the DNA evidence as well as testimony of witnesses who were attacked by the accused at different times throughout his criminal career. On September 25, 2014, Little was found guilty and was sentenced to life imprisonment without the possibility of parole. On the day of the verdict, Little continued to insist on his innocence. Before his death, Little was serving a sentence at California State Prison, Los Angeles County.

=== Later confessions ===
On November 9, 2018, Little confessed to the 1996 fatal strangulation of Melissa Thomas. On November 13, 2018, Little was charged with the 1994 murder of Denise Christie Brothers in Odessa, Texas, after having confessed the crime to a Texas Ranger in May 2018. Little pleaded guilty to the murder of Brothers on December 13 and received another life sentence. The Ector County, Texas, District Attorney and Wise County, Texas, Sheriff's Office announced on November 13 that Little had confessed to dozens of murders and may have committed more than 90 across fourteen states between 1970 and 2005.

On November 15, 2018, the Russell County, Alabama, District Attorney announced that Little had earlier that month confessed to the 1979 murder of 23-year-old Brenda Alexander, whose body was found in Phenix City, Alabama. On November 16, 2018, Macon, Georgia, sheriffs announced that Little had credibly confessed to the 1977 strangling murder of an unidentified woman and the 1982 strangling murder of 18-year-old Fredonia Smith. In the fall of 2018, Little confessed to the 1982 murder of 55-year-old Dorothy Richards and the 1996 murder of 40-year-old Daisy McGuire; both of their bodies were found in Houma, Louisiana.

On November 19, 2018, Harrison County, Mississippi, sheriff Troy Peterson said that Little had confessed to strangling 36-year-old Julia Critchfield in the Gulfport area in 1978 and dumping her body off a cliff. On November 20, 2018, Lee County, Mississippi law enforcement officials announced that Little had admitted to killing 46-year-old Nancy Carol Stevens in Tupelo, Mississippi, in 2005 and that the case would be presented to a grand jury in January 2019. On November 21, 2018, Richland County, South Carolina, authorities announced that Little had confessed to murdering 19-year-old Evelyn Weston, whose body was found near Fort Jackson, South Carolina, in 1978. Little confessed to having killed 20-year-old Rosie Hill in Marion County, Florida, in 1982.

On November 27, 2018, the Federal Bureau of Investigation (FBI) announced that a Violent Criminal Apprehension Program team had confirmed 34 of Little's confessions and was working to match the remainder of Little's confessions to known murders or suspicious deaths. Little began making the confessions in exchange for a transfer out of the Los Angeles County prison in which he was being held. One included his confession to a previous cold case homicide in Prince George's County, Maryland, previously one of only two homicide cases in that county with unidentified victims.

In December 2018, Little was indicted for strangling Linda Sue Boards, 23, to death in May 1981 in Warren County, Kentucky. Her body was found on May 15, 1981, near U.S. Route 68. One of Little's victims was identified in December 2018 as Martha Cunningham of Knox County, Tennessee, who was 34 when Little murdered her in 1975.

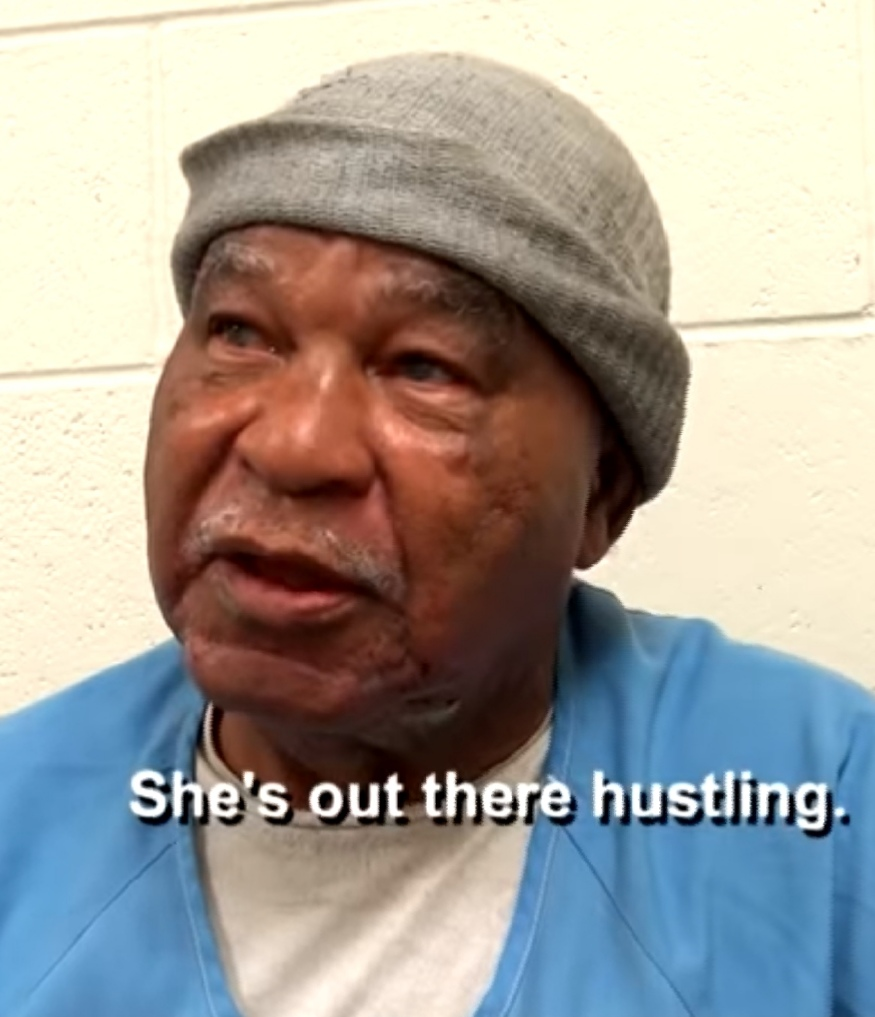
Little during an interview

On May 31, 2019, Cuyahoga County, Ohio, prosecutors announced indictments, with four counts of aggravated murder and six counts of kidnapping, that accuse Little of killing Mary Jo Peyton in 1984 and Rose Evans in 1991 in Cleveland. Both victims were strangled and dumped. The body of Rose Evans, 32, was found on August 24, 1991, in a vacant lot on East 39th St. She left her hometown of Binghamton, New York, when she was 17. Evans had been strangled, according to coroner Elizabeth Balraj. As for Peyton, an anthropologist had to create a model of what she looked like, but she remained unidentified until 1992 when Cleveland put her thumbprint in an FBI data base and got a match. Little picked up Peyton at a bar near East 105th and Euclid Avenues. He described her as a short, plump woman in her twenties with brown hair. Little confessed to killing another Cleveland woman in 1977 or 1978. The woman murdered in 1977 or 1978 was found on March 18, 1983, in Willoughby Hills, Ohio, according to the National Missing and Unidentified Persons System. She was likely Black and somewhere between 17 and 35. The woman's body had been dumped down a grassy slope, near a fence in a wooded area just off Interstate 271; when her body was found by a man walking his dog, only her skeleton, some clothing, and jewelry remained.

Little confessed to killing one woman in Akron, Ohio, two in Cincinnati, one of the bodies having been dumped outside of Columbus, Ohio, and one woman he met in Columbus and disposed of in Kentucky. Of the two women Little murdered in Cincinnati, one was identified as Anna Stewart, 33, whose body was dumped in Grove City, Ohio. Stewart was last seen on October 6, 1981, getting out of a cab at General Hospital to see her sister in the hospital (now University of Cincinnati Academic Health Center). She was killed on October 11. He killed the other woman between 1980 and 1999. The "Jane Doe" was anywhere from 15 to 50 as the details of her age and the date of her murder are unclear. She was Black, slender, wore glasses and lived in the Over-the-Rhine neighborhood of Cincinnati with a "heavy female Hispanic". Little left her beside a cigarette billboard in Ohio. On June 7, 2019, Little was indicted in Hamilton County, Ohio, for murdering the two women killed in Cincinnati.

Little had drawn portraits of many women he killed. These portraits were released by the FBI in hopes of someone identifying the women. At least one portrait solved a cold case in Akron, Ohio. In November 2020, Little confessed to two Florida murders, for one of which another man had been wrongfully convicted. On April 22, 2022, a woman Little killed in Memphis, Tennessee, whose body was found on the Arkansas side of the Mississippi River, in 1990 was identified as 30-year-old Zena Marie Jones.

== Victims ==
=== Confirmed ===
Little admitted to 93 different murders in total, and 60 deaths have been formally connected to him by the police. The majority of Little's victims were sex workers, substance users, or homeless individuals, and most of them were female. He claimed that he thought these persons would leave fewer clues for authorities to find and leave fewer persons to search for them. Despite the broad scope of his offending, Little was charged with and convicted of only eight murders in total as these cases had the strongest evidence of guilt:

- Annie Lee Stewart, 32, was murdered on October 11, 1981, in Cincinnati, Ohio. Little strangled her and disposed of her body in the woods behind some apartments off Queen Anne Place in Grove City, Ohio. Little was convicted of her murder on August 23, 2019.
- Mary Jo Peyton, 21, was murdered sometime in 1984 after she encountered Little at a bar in Cleveland, Ohio. Little claimed that he and Peyton left the bar together; he then took her to an abandoned factory. He choked her there before throwing her body down a basement staircase. Two workers from a nearby company discovered her dead on July 3, 1984, a few weeks later. Little was convicted on August 23, 2019.
- Carol Linda Alford, 41, was murdered by Little in Los Angeles, California. Authorities discovered Little's first DNA match on her underwear and under her fingernails. On July 13, 1987, her body was discovered in a Los Angeles alley. From the waist down, she was nude. Her daughter recognized her body. She had been strangled to death, an autopsy indicated. She also experienced other wounds, such as a punch-related head injury from blunt force. Little was found guilty of the crime on September 25, 2014.
- Audrey Nelson Everett, 35, was found in a dumpster behind a night club and restaurant in Los Angeles, California, on August 14, 1989. There was nothing found that could be used to identify her body, which was naked from the waist down. She had been repeatedly hit on the head before being forcefully strangled, according to an autopsy. DNA linked Little to the crime, and he was convicted on September 25, 2014.
- Guadalupe Apodaca, 46, was found on September 3, 1989, at an abandoned auto repair shop in Los Angeles, California, after a boy kicking a soccer ball against the building peered into the windows and saw her body. Authorities determined that Little kneeled on her chest and strangled her with his hands, causing her to have a seizure. She was nude from the waist down and had blood in her anal cavity as well. DNA linked Little to the crime, and he was convicted on September 25, 2014.
- Zena Marie Jones, 30, was a woman found murdered in West Memphis, Arkansas, on July 28, 1990, after going missing on July 6 from Memphis, Tennessee. On the Arkansas side of the Mississippi River, close to the shore, and about eight feet from the river's mile marker 722.2, a fisherman discovered the victim. Little admitted to killing her and provided a sketch in 2018. He claimed she was a prostitute who was between the ages of 28 and 29 and that he had picked her up at a Memphis motel. As a Memphis Police car passed them, he choked her while they were in his car. He then dropped the victim into the river once he entered Arkansas and pulled up to a bridge. On August 23, 2019, he was found guilty of her homicide. She was identified in April 2022, after her family noticed a resemblance between the composite sketch drawn by Little and Jones.
- Rose Evans, 32, was murdered in Cleveland, Ohio, on or around August 24, 1991. Little encountered Evans while driving and offered her a ride. Then, in an abandoned area, he strangled her in his car. He was convicted of her murder on August 23, 2019.
- Denise Christie Brothers, 32, was a mother of two who was found killed in Odessa, Texas, on February 2, 1994. Brothers had been reported missing on January 1, 1994. According to District Attorney Bobby Bland, she had been strangled. Little pleaded guilty to killing her, receiving his fourth life sentence for it on December 13, 2018.

=== Confessed ===
Name of victim	Date of murder	Location of murder	Age	Ref.
Mary Jo Brosley	December 31, 1970	Homestead, Florida	33	
"Linda"	1971	Miami, Florida	22	
"Marianne/Mary Ann"	1971–72	Miami, Florida	18	
"Donna/Sarah"	1971–72	Kendall, Florida	18–25	
Unnamed white female	1972	Prince George's County, Maryland	20–25	
Sarah Brown	1973	New Orleans, Louisiana	39	
Agatha White Buffalo	November 1973	Omaha, Nebraska	34	
"Kat"	1974	Savannah, Georgia	22–23	
Leola Etta Bryant	1974	Charleston, South Carolina	51	
Martha Cunningham	December 31, 1974	Knox County, Tennessee	34	
"Emily"	Mid-1970s	Miami, Florida	23–24	
Lee Ann Helms	June 1977	Houston, Texas	21	
Yvonne Pless	September 1977	Macon, Georgia	20	
Clara Birdlong	December 1977	Pascagoula, Mississippi	44	
Unnamed black female	1977–1978	Cleveland, Ohio	17–24	
Julia Critchfield	January 1978	Harrison County, Mississippi	36	
Evelyn Weston	September 1978	Columbia, South Carolina	19	
Brenda Alexander	August 1979	Phenix City, Alabama	23	
Linda Sue Boards	May 1981	Smiths Grove, Kentucky	23	
Patricia Parker	September 1981	Dade County, Georgia	25–30	
Fredonia Smith	July 1982	Macon, Georgia	18	
Rosie Hill	August 1982	Marion County, Florida	20	
Patricia Ann Mount	September 1982	Alachua County, Florida	26	
Dorothy Richard	September 1982	Houma, Louisiana	56	
Melinda LaPree	October 1982	Pascagoula, Mississippi	22	
Unnamed black female	Autumn 1982	New Orleans, Louisiana	30–40	
Unnamed black female	1984	San Bernardino, California	18–23	
Auggie Gortz	1984	Savannah, Georgia	23	
"Granny"	1987	Los Angeles, California	50	
Linda Bennett	May 1988	Owenton, Kentucky	38	
Alice Denise Duvall	June 11, 1991	Los Angeles, California	40–45	
Roberta Tandarich	September 1991	Akron, Ohio	34	
Alice Denise Taylor; Tracy Lynn Johnson	December 1992	Gulfport, Mississippi	Taylor (27); Johnson (19)	
"Ruth"	1992–93 (April 21, 1994)	North Little Rock, Arkansas	24	
Unnamed black female	1993	Las Vegas, Nevada	40	
Ruby Dean Lane	May 1993	Perry, Florida	19	
Jolanda Jones	1994	Pine Bluff, Arkansas	26	
Melissa Thomas	January 1996	Opelousas, Louisiana	29	
Daisy McGuire	February 1996	Houma, Louisiana	40	
"T-Money"	1996	Los Angeles, California	23–24	
Unnamed white female	1996	Los Angeles, California	23–25	
Priscilla Baxter-Jones	1997	West Memphis, Arkansas	36	
Nancy Carol Stevens	August 2005	Tupelo, Mississippi	46	

== Personal life and death ==
Little had a long-term girlfriend, Orelia Dorsey, since deceased, who supported them both through shoplifting for years. On May 28, 1971, he was arrested in Cleveland with his girlfriend at the time, Lucy Madero, and they were charged with robbery of a gas station. It is unknown how Dorsey had met Little, but by coincidence she was cellmates with Madero. While in jail, Madero confided in her cellmate, Dorsey, that she would be testifying against Little in the subsequent robbery case. In 1972, when the case went to trial, Madero testified against Little, but his defense team was able to plan for it with help from information passed on by Dorsey. Little was eventually found not guilty. Dorsey and Little were together until she died of natural causes (brain hemorrhage) in Los Angeles in 1988. Little died on December 30, 2020, in a Los Angeles County area hospital. Although California Department of Corrections and Rehabilitation sources indicate no cause of death, Little suffered from diabetes, heart problems, and other health conditions. In 2024, Zak Bagans took up ownership of Little's remains and personal items.

== Media ==
Jillian Lauren, who initially had begun writing a mystery novel, investigated Little and interviewed him at length in prison. Mitzi Roberts, a detective in the Los Angeles Police Department, told her in an interview: "Well, I’m proud of them all, but I did catch this serial killer Sam Little once. That was pretty cool." After that, Lauren switched from writing crime fiction to writing a non-fiction book about Little, and in the course of her preparation, spent more than 40 hours interviewing him. During the interviews, he confessed to multiple murders and sent her drawings of his victims. In December 2018, Lauren wrote about her experience interviewing Little for The Cut.

Joe Berlinger read the article and thought it would be interesting for a feature-length film or documentary series and met with Lauren. The five-part television miniseries Confronting a Serial Killer, directed and produced by Berlinger, presents her investigation and premiered on April 18, 2021, on Starz. In 2023, Lauren's book Behold the Monster: Confronting America's Most Prolific Serial Killer and Uncovering the Women Society Forgot was published by Sourcebooks.

== See also ==
- List of serial killers by number of victims
- List of serial killers in the United States
