= Confronting a Serial Killer =

American documentary television miniseries

- Genre: Documentary
- Directed by: Joe Berlinger
- Composer: Joel Goodman
- Country of origin: United States
- Original language: English
- No. of episodes: 5

Production
- Executive producers: Joe Berlinger; Joe Doran; Jon Kamen; Po Kutchins
- Cinematography: Andrew Dunn; Taylor Gentry
- Editors: Jennifer Honn; Charlotte Stobbs; Cy Christiansen
- Production companies: Third Eye Motion Picture Company; RadicalMedia; Lionsgate Television

Original release
- Network: Starz
- Release: April 18 – May 16, 2021

Confronting a Serial Killer is an American documentary television miniseries directed and produced by Joe Berlinger. It explores Jillian Lauren, as she lures and investigates Sam Little, the most prolific serial killer in American history. It consists of 5 episodes and premiered on April 18, 2021, on Starz.

== Plot ==
The series follows Jillian Lauren, as she lures and investigates Sam Little, the most prolific serial killer in American history.

== Episodes ==
No.	Title	Directed by	Original release date	U.S. viewers (millions)
1	"Getting Away with Murders"	Joe Berlinger	April 18, 2021	0.084
2	"Deal with The Devil"	Joe Berlinger	April 25, 2021	0.071
3	"Behold the Monster"	Joe Berlinger	May 2, 2021	0.052
4	"Restoring Their Names"	Joe Berlinger	May 9, 2021	0.031
5	"No Longer Jane Doe"	Joe Berlinger	May 16, 2021	N/A

== Production ==
Jillian Lauren initially began writing a mystery novel, and while interviewing detective Mitzi Roberts of The Los Angeles Police Department she told Lauren: "Well, I’m proud of them all, but I did catch this serial killer Sam Little once. That was pretty cool." Lauren began writing a non-fiction book about Little, and spent more than 40 hours interviewing him, where he confessed to multiple murders and sent her drawings of his victims. In December 2018, Lauren wrote about her experiencing interviewing Little for The Cut. Joe Berlinger read the article and thought it would be interesting for a feature-length film or documentary series and met with Lauren.

== Release ==
The series had its world premiere with the first two episodes debuting at South by Southwest on March 16, 2021. It premiered in the United States on Starz on April 18, 2021.

== Reception ==
On Rotten Tomatoes, the series holds an approval rating of 83% based on 6 reviews, with an average rating of 8.33/10. On Metacritic, the series holds a rating of 55 out of 100, based on 4 critics, indicating "mixed or average reviews".
