= TRS-80 (group) =

American electronic music group

TRS-80 is an electronic music group formed in Chicago in 1997 and led by founding member, Jay Rajeck.

== Biography ==
TRS-80 was started by Kent Rayhill and Jay Rajeck in their hometown of Chicago, with Deb Schimmel joining them early on. The trio shared a common desire to write and perform music with real drums and synthesizers. A music writing frenzy of over 50 songs took place at Rajeck's home studio. The band played their first live show in 1998, opening for Death In Vegas at Double Door in Chicago. The band was known for their incorporation of visuals projected in sync with their music during live performances.

Chicago indie rock venue The Empty Bottle took TRS-80 under their wing shortly after hearing the band's demo and put them on the bill with artists like Sonic Boom, Acid Mothers Temple, Oval, and Laika among others, which helped grow TRS-80 a local following. From there they received bigger shows at venues like Metro, the Vic Theater and the 2,500 seat Riviera Theater opening for B52s, The Sisters of Mercy, The Creatures and other touring bands.

Over the next five years TRS-80 worked with two local record labels, released four albums, and toured parts of the US and Canada. The band also created custom scores for the award-winning Public Radio International show, This American Life and a Nike promotional film titled "Les Jumelles" created by Tron Legacy director, Joseph Kosinski.

In February 2005 Kent and Deb performed their last show, retiring from the stage to pursue other non-musical interests. In March 2005 Rajeck performed as TRS-80 with Mike Barron and Fred de Albuquerque on synthesizers and toured that summer in Canada and the US.

In 2006 TRS-80's music was featured twice in CSI: NY and an international Coca-Cola TV ad campaign. Jay Rajeck relocated to Los Angeles and released the full-length album "Mystery Crash" and sister release "Demixes" through Hollywood based One Cell Records after completing a West Coast tour. Long time TRS-80 video collaborator Eric Fensler relocated to Los Angeles from New York shortly thereafter and became Rajeck's partner in TRS-80 performances playing synth. The New You EP was released in 2008 through TRS-80's new label home, Vinyl International and music from the album was featured in the video game Saints Row 2 that sold over 2 million copies. TRS-80's first custom filmed music video for the single "Tinted" was created and took record sales to an all-time high.

== Discography ==
Albums

- Industry Needs Electronic Skills (1999)
- The Manhattan Love Machine (2000)
- Backup : 01 (2001)
- Mr. Kickass (2002)
- Shake Hands With Danger (2003)
- Mystery Crash (2006)
- Demixes (2006) - Mystery Crash remixes
- Horizons (2011)

Singles and EP's

- Radiograbadora EP (1998)
- Telemetry / 5000 Lbs Of Thrust (1999)
- The New You EP (2008)
- Sky Sailor EP (2011)
- Turn A Corner (2012)
- Dream Sequence (Single Mix) (2013)
- Mirage (Single Mix) (2013)
- Got Blues (2020)
- Body Talk (Screener Copy) (2021)
- Private Position (2021)
- Dead On (2021)

Compilations

- Backup : 02 (2024) - TRS-80's earliest works written by and remastered by Kent Rayhill
- Volume One (2014) - TRS-80's earliest works remastered by Jay Rajeck
- Volume Two (2014) - The second half of TRS-80's earliest works remastered by Jay Rajeck
