= Have a Good Trip: Adventures in Psychedelics =

2020 documentary film

- Film poster
- Directed by: Donick Cary
- Written by: Donick Cary
- Produced by: Stuart Cornfeld; Jeremy Reitz; Mike Rosenstein; Ben Stiller; Jim Ziegler
- Cinematography: Skyler Rousselet; Stash Slionski
- Edited by: Greg Stees
- Production companies: Sunset Rose Pictures; Sugarshack 2000
- Distributed by: Netflix
- Release date: May 11, 2020
- Running time: 85 minutes
- Countries: United States; United Kingdom; Australia
- Language: English

Have a Good Trip: Adventures in Psychedelics is a 2020 documentary film directed and written by Emmy winning producer, writer, and director Donick Cary and hosted by Nick Offerman. The documentary revolves around celebrities telling anecdotes about hallucinogenic drug usage. It is among the final film appearances of Fred Willard, Anthony Bourdain, and Carrie Fisher.

== Pre-Production ==
In an interview with marijuana-style writer Katie Shapiro, director Donick Cary revealed how the documentary idea came about. Cary first came up with the idea for the documentary after having a conversation with Ben Stiller and Fisher Stevens at the Nantucket Film Festival back in 2009. Both Cary and Stiller are board members of the Nantucket Film Festival, which Cary explains is a place where people just go to hang out, talk about ideas and watch documentaries. At this festival, while eating together in a lounge, they shared stories about different hallucinogens and the different effects that they produce. During this conversation, Cary explained that he thought it would be a good idea if there was a movie that shared different crazy stories about people’s experiences with drugs. Cary suggested to both Stiller and Fisher that they should all work together to make a documentary. He thought it would be cool to also have a movie where those stories could be reenacted and also include animations. Stiller and Fisher agreed and were willing to make the documentary. A few months later, Cary formally pitched the idea for the documentary to Ben Stiller’s team. Cary, however, made it clear that the original goal was just to have people tell some funny stories, and then it evolved into a film about educating the public about drugs and having serious conversations about psychedelics. Cary also reveals that he wondered how he would make a film that seemed somewhat pro-psychedelic but at the same time non-biased, and that shows all the sides of drugs and how it relates to individual's lives.

== Production ==
Cary further explains how he got all the celebrities in the film to agree to share their stories and be part of the film. In the interview, he states that he asked everyone he knew to be a part of the film and revealed that “anyone who said yes — roughly 1 in 10! — [they] went and interviewed.” He mentioned that he conducted over a hundred interviews, enough to break down into series or multiple films. He goes as far as to say that with all the footage he gathered he could easily make 30 episodes. Cary also reveals that they interviewed twice as many people as are in the documentary, and hinted at making a Part Two which would include many other interviews with people who weren’t included in the first part of the film. He is hoping that Part Two will include stories by “David Crosby and Patton Oswalt, Whitney Cummings and Ozzy Osbourne to Bootsy Collins, Devo and the Jackass guys” and several more.

The film was financed by his producing partner Mike Rosenstein from Sunset Rose Pictures and from Cary’s own company called Sugarshack 2000. It is unknown how much money was spent on making the film.

Cary revealed that making the documentary was never a full-time job—he took his time. The film took 11 years to make, partly because they had to work around celebrities’ schedules. Scheduling was done through an agency called Central Talent Booking. Cary also stated that he got a lot of support and help from Ben Stiller’s company Red Hour and Fisher Stevens’s company.

The movie was filmed in various locations including Carrie Fisher’s Beverly Hills home which she referred to as the “acid house.” While most of the interviews were filmed at the interviewee’s houses and apartments, other interviews, such as Sarah Silverman’s, were filmed at a park. The re-enactments were also filmed in several locations, one of which took place at a beach.

The music for the film was done by the American indie rock band Yo La Tengo, along with music supervisor Kim Huffman Cary.

== Cast ==
=== Subjects ===
The documentary features interviews with:

- Sting
- A$AP Rocky
- Bill Kreutzmann
- Rosie Perez
- Reggie Watts
- Robert Ben Garant
- Thomas Lennon
- Brett Gelman
- Will Forte
- David Cross
- Carrie Fisher
- Natasha Lyonne
- Anthony Bourdain
- Ben Stiller
- Deepak Chopra
- Sarah Silverman
- David Koechner
- Andy Richter
- Judd Nelson
- Jim James
- Diedrich Bader
- Lewis Black
- Dr. Charles Grob
- Rob Huebel
- Nick Kroll
- Rob Corddry
- Matt Besser
- Adam Horovitz
- Kathleen Hanna
- Paul Scheer
- Donovan
- Zach Leary (son of Timothy Leary)
- Marc Maron
- Shepard Fairey

=== Cast ===
- Rob Corddry as Paul Scheer
- Paul Scheer as Rob Corddry
- Riki Lindhome as Emily
- Adam Scott as After-School Special narrator
- Ron Funches as Ron
- Maya Erskine as Maya
- Haley Joel Osment as Gabe
- Fred Willard as “Just Hang On” guy
- Adam Devine as young Anthony Bourdain
- Blake Anderson as Bourdain’s friend
- Nick Kroll as Kelp Monster
- Armen Weitzman as Drug Dealer
- Natasha Leggero as young Carrie Fisher
- Nelson Franklin as young Lewis Black
- James Adomian as Animation Voices

== Release ==
It was released on May 11, 2020, on Netflix. Have a Good Trip: Adventures in Psychedelics was originally set to premiere at the South by Southwest (SXSW) film festival. The film’s director revealed that unfortunately, the SXSW was among the American events that were canceled amid growing fears of the coronavirus pandemic. He revealed that he and the people who helped create the film were so thrilled and excited to showcase their comedic documentary at the SXSW film festival and also expressed their disappointment with the festival’s cancellation by revealing that they “cried and hugged. And then stopped hugging because…you know… pandemic.” Besides his original plan of releasing the film during the film festival, Cary also revealed that they had planned to have a big screening and party along with music playing live by the band Yo La Tengo, Reggie Watts, and more. They were also going to have conversations and panels with comedy featuring live DJ sets. Despite the premiere’s cancellation, Cary teamed up with a movie streaming service to release the film on an online platform. Netflix Originals brought the documentary straight to stream on May 11, 2020. The film remained in the top ten for more than a month after its release. Cary hopes that the film makes people laugh and hopes that it can start a bigger conversation regarding mental health as well as the advantages and disadvantages of psychedelics.

When asked about his future plans for film festivities once the stay at home restrictions have been lifted, Cary said that he would love to take the film “coast to coast and beyond...bring along some live comedy, music, and experts in the field to do panel conversations, answer questions…dance? Hug again?”

== Reception ==
The documentary received mixed reviews, the consensus being that while some appreciate that the film brings awareness to how drugs can possibly be used in the future to treat various medical conditions such as depression and anxiety, others were disappointed with the film’s use of comedic elements. On Rotten Tomatoes, the documentary has an approval rating of 58% based on 26 reviews. The website's critical consensus reads, "Good Trip" aims to entertain, not educate as it presents a star-studded parade of celebrity reminiscences about taking hallucinogenic drugs. The site's critical consensus reads, "Have a Good Trip: Adventures in Psychedelics is an entertaining enough look at hallucinogenics' effects, but its shallow treatment can't help but disappoint." On Metacritic, the film received a 44 out of 100 based on 9 critics calling it “a series of revue-style blackout sketches, lengthy digressions, and dead ends.”

== See also ==
- List of psychedelic documentaries
