= Doug Lussenhop =

American musician, video editor, and comedian

- Lussenhop in 2026
- Born: Doug Lussenhop; March 8, 1973 (age 53); Darien, Illinois, U.S.
- Other names: DJ Douggpound; The Shovel
- Occupations: Musician, video editor, comedian
- Years active: 1999–present
- Website: douggpound.com

Doug Lussenhop (born March 8, 1973), known professionally as DJ Douggpound, is an American musician, video editor, and comedian. Lussenhop is best known for his weekly appearance as co-host of Office Hours Live. He is also widely recognized as the editor for Tim and Eric Awesome Show, Great Job!, which prominently features his trademark editing style. He edited and acted in many Tim & Eric projects, including Tom Goes to the Mayor, Tim and Eric Nite Live!, and Tim and Eric's Billion Dollar Movie. In 2024, Lussenhop supported the Eric Andre Show Live Tour as its opening act.

== Early life ==
Doug Lussenhop was born and raised in Darien, Illinois. His early work includes collaborating with Eric Fensler in the creation of his G.I. Joe PSA parodies. Lussenhop attended the College of DuPage and Columbia College Chicago where he studied film. After college, Lussenhop and David Dobie founded Heaven Gallery, a small art gallery in Chicago. During this time, Lussenhop was a creator of video art, and had his work showcased at MoMA PS1 in New York City.

Lussenhop moved from Chicago to Los Angeles in 2003. He met Tim & Eric for the first time in 2004 after answering a Craigslist ad for their production of Tom Goes to the Mayor.

== Television career ==
He has had a lengthy career in television, both as an editor and a comedy writer. His notable programs include Tim and Eric Awesome Show, Great Job!, The Eric Andre Show, and Portlandia. In 2015, with Daniel Weidenfeld, Lussenhop co-developed and co-wrote an 11-minute live-action pilot for Adult Swim created by Weidenfeld and starring himself, called The Pound Hole.

== Comedy projects ==
The Poundcast

In 2007, Lussenhop created and starred in "The Poundcast", a sketch series that aired on SuperDeluxe.com. The series featured surreal sketches, each with a musical theme.

Pound House

In 2013, he created and starred in the web series "Pound House", alongside frequent collaborator Brent Weinbach. The series was produced by Jash, and was filmed largely at Lussenhop's Los Angeles home.. In January 2023, Doug and Brent crowdsourced funding to produce six new episodes for their fourth season of "Pound House".

2 Wet Crew

As the comedy trio "2 Wet Crew", Doug Lussenhop, Mikey Kampmann, and Jay Weingarten create online sketches and host a live comedy show in Los Angeles.

== Music albums ==
Along with creating original music for television programs, he is a self-described "Joke DJ" and creates songs that combine music and comedy. Lussenhop was the opening act for Tim & Eric during several of their international tours. In 2009, Lussenhop released an original album of songs called Pound It, many of which had been created for sketches in his Poundcast series.

Lussenhop has recorded several albums that have been released on labels Gnar Tapes, Kerchow Records, and SBI Press. His albums include Pound It, Up Our Holes, Nickels Get Jelly, The Archives Volume Two, Videovember, and The Body Tight Workout.

== Podcasting ==
Along with fellow comedians Neal Brennan and Moshe Kasher, Lussenhop cohosted The Champs podcast, where Lussenhop interrupted the interviews with musical cues and audio drops. After departing from The Champs, Lussenhop started his own podcast, The Poundcast, which he hosts with Brent Weinbach. Lussenhop is also a co-host of the podcast Office Hours with Tim Heidecker along with Vic Berger.
