= Some Girls: My Life in a Harem =

2010 book by Jillian Lauren

- First edition (publ. Plume Books)
- Author: Jillian Lauren
- Language: English
- Subject: Harem
- Genre: Autobiography
- Set in: 1992–1995 in Brunei
- Publisher: Plume
- Publication date: April 27, 2010
- Media type: Paperback
- Pages: 368
- ISBN: 978-0452296312

Some Girls: My Life in a Harem, a book published in 2010 and written by Jillian Lauren, is an autobiographical account of her experiences as one of the paid young female "guests" of Prince Jefri Bolkiah, brother of the Sultan of Brunei, between 1992 and 1995.

The book focuses on Lauren's personal experiences, and includes a description of the arrangements she says were an established practice for young female guests of the prince during part of the 1990s.

- Young, attractive women were hired for a short-term contract, typically for three weeks.
- Contracts in some cases got extended, in some cases for up to a year or two or more.
- The female guests were accommodated in luxurious houses on the grounds of the royal estate, and had only limited access to places outside of the property.
- The female guests were paid relatively well, in the order of US$20,000 per week, and were additionally given valuable gifts such as jewellery.
- The female guests were expected to attend a party on any evening when Prince Jefri was expected to be present. The party would include one- or two-dozen of the paid women, Prince Jefri, and a number of Jefri's friends and other male guests. The parties involved singing, dancing, drinks, and light entertainment. One girl would typically leave the party with Prince Jefri for some time.
- The female guests would sometimes, although rarely, be escorted to meet with Prince Jefri during daytime in his office.

According to the book, Lauren became Jefri's number two girlfriend, leading her to meet the Sultan in person, as well as to travel abroad with Jefri's entourage. She said her total income between 1992 and 1995, from about two years presence in Brunei, was about US$300,000.

People other than the royalty of Brunei are primarily mentioned in the book by first name only. One of the guests, Sheila, was a former Penthouse "Pet of the Year", who had lived with the family of Bob Guccione before joining the harem. One of the long-term guests, Fiona, was a former TV actress from the Philippines, whom Jefri had first seen on television. After a long presence as the number one girlfriend, Fiona was awarded one million dollars and an engagement ring, as a part of an offer for her to join the ranks of Jefri's multiple wives, but Fiona rejected the offer and left Brunei.
