= Brent Weinbach =

American actor

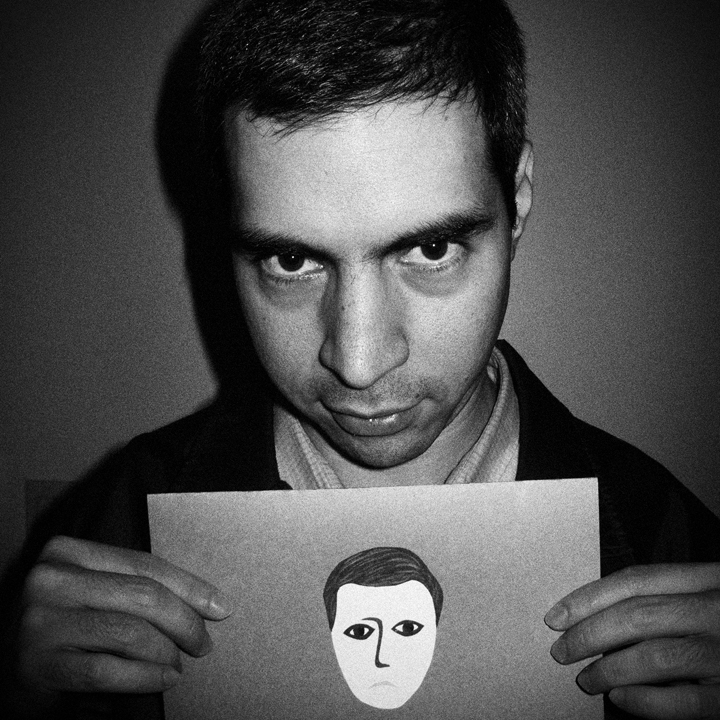
- Weinbach in 2012
- Education: University of California, Berkeley
- Occupations: Comedian, actor, director, pianist
- Years active: 2000–present
- Relatives: Laura Weinbach (sister) • Anton Patzner (brother-in-law)
- Website: www.brentweinbach.com

Brent Weinbach is an American stand-up comedian, actor, director, and pianist based in Los Angeles, California. He is known for his experimental style and abstract, deadpan delivery. He is a graduate of the University of California, Berkeley and was formerly a professional jazz pianist and substitute teacher.

Weinbach is also known for creating various video sensations such as Gangster Party Line, Mind Jack, and Ultimate Drumming Technique and is the co-creator and co-director of the cult web series, Pound House alongside DJ Douggpound which was nominated for a Streamy Award. Brent is a recipient of the Andy Kaufman Award, which recognizes innovation in stand-up comedy and was a finalist in the 2008 San Francisco Comedy Competition. Brent has appeared on Conan, Lopez Tonight, and various shows on Comedy Central. He also toured with the Comedians of Comedy and has performed at such festivals as Coachella, SF Sketchfest, Bumbershoot and the Just for Laughs Festival.

His first album, inspired by Joe Frank, is Tales from the Brown Side. His second album, released in September 2009, is called The Night Shift and features a blend of live recorded comedy, studio recordings, and original musical compositions." His third album Mostly Live was released in 2012.

He appeared with a small role in the film Medicine for Melancholy in 2008. In 2010, he began hosting The Legacy Music Hour, a podcast in which he and co-host Rob F. Switch discuss retro video game music from the 1980s and 1990s, along with crossover appearances with Laser Time podcast. In December 2016, Weinbach appeared as a guest on the Let's Play webseries Game Grumps, commentating over Rare's Time Lord. He appeared again in 2025, playing Gekibo: Gekisha Boy.

He is half-Filipino and half-Jewish along with his sister Laura Weinbach of the band Foxtails Brigade which includes his brother-in-law Anton Patzner.

In 2022, he won the Best Screenplay (spirit of Los Angeles award) with Bruno Kohfield-Galeano at the Los Angeles International Film Festival.

== Filmography ==
Year	Title	Role	Notes
2008	Medicine for Melancholy	Waiter	
2008	Live at Gotham	Himself	
2010	I Am Comic	Himself	Documentary
2011	Lopez Tonight	Himself	2 episodes
2011	Conan	Himself	Episode: "The Way to a Man's Heart Is Through My Multi-Level Marketing Plan"
2012	Funny as Hell	Himself	TV series
2013	The Middle	Greg	Episode: "The Ditch"
2013	Stepsister	Matt	Short
2013–15	Comedy Bang! Bang!	Mailman / Carlo Smencia	2 episodes
2013–23	Pound House	Brent	Also co-creator, co-director, writer
2014	Garfunkel and Oates	Andy	Episode: "Speechless"
2014	Pretty Perfect	Volunteer	
2014	Tim and Eric's Bedtime Stories	Brett (Young Intern)	Episode: "The Endorsement"
2014	I Don't Dance	Brent	Also creator, writer, director, producer
2014	Booze Boys & Brownies	Cous Cous	
2015	The Meltdown with Jonah and Kumail	Himself - Guest	2 episodes
2015	Kroll Show		Episode: "The Commonwealth Games"
2015	Adventure Time	Bass Drum / Additional Voices (voice)	Episode: "Friends Forever"
2015	Another Period	Scoops LaPue	3 episodes
2015	The Eric Andre Show	Writer	
2015–16	@midnight	Himself	2 episodes
2016	The 4th	Uber Driver	
2016	Flophouse	Himself	TV series documentary
2016	Poop Talk	Himself	Documentary
2016, 2025	Guest Grumps	Himself	2 episodes
2017	Clarence	Voice	TV series
2017	Appealing to the Mainstream	Himself	TV special
2018	Corporate	Walter	Ep: Casual Friday
2020	The Dress Up Gang	Brent	
2020	Close Enough	Lee	Ep: Golden Gamer
2025	Blippo+	Brenden Challenger	Full-motion video game
TBA	False Awakenings		Story by

== Discography ==
- Tales From The Brown Side (2004)
- The Night Shift (2009)
- Mostly Live (2012)
- Appealing to the Mainstream (2017)
- Christmas Piano (2017)
