= Jillian Lauren =

American writer, performer and former escort

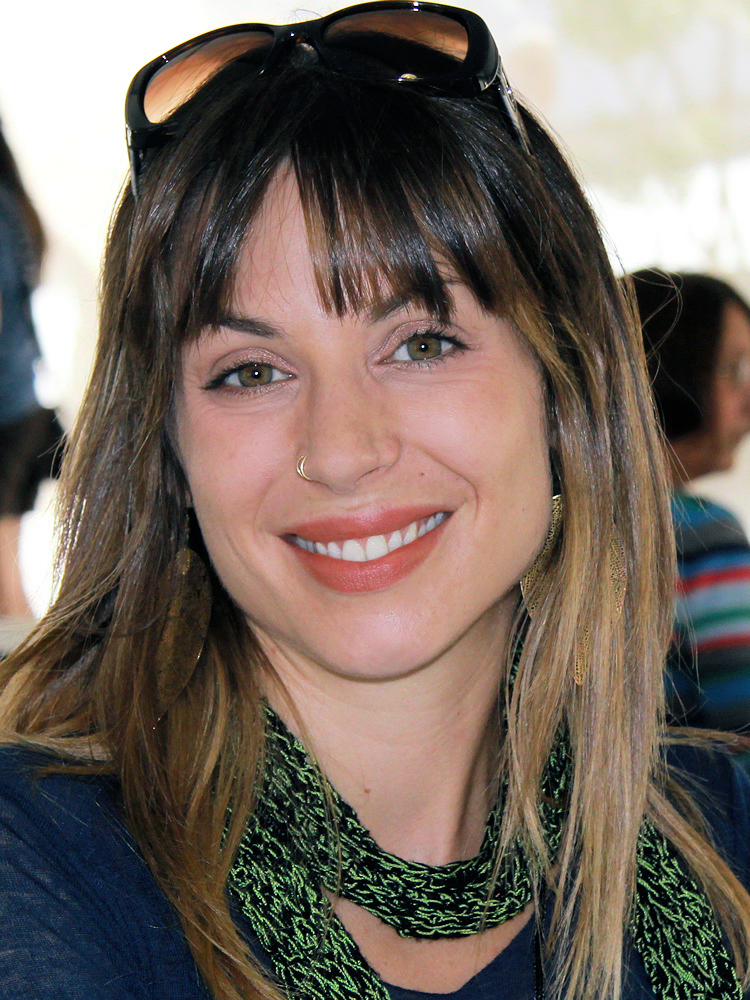
- Jillian Lauren at the 2011 Texas Book Festival
- Born: August 16, 1973 (age 53); Highland Park, Illinois
- Occupation: Novelist
- Spouse: Scott Shriner (m. 2005; sep. 2025)
- Children: 2
- Writing career
- Period: 2001–present
- Genres: Tragicomedy, fiction, memoir
- Notable works: Everything You Ever Wanted, Some Girls: My Life in a Harem and Pretty
- Website: jillianlauren.com

Jillian Lauren Shriner (born Jillian Lauren Dreskin August 16, 1973) is an American writer, performer, adoption advocate, and former call girl for Jefri Bolkiah, Prince of Brunei. She wrote two memoirs about her time spent as a call girl, including Some Girls: My Life in a Harem, about her time spent in the harem of the Prince of Brunei.

== Early life and education ==
Lauren was born in Highland Park, Illinois and was adopted as a baby. She grew up in Livingston, New Jersey, and graduated in 1991 from Newark Academy. She later moved to New York City, where she briefly studied acting at New York University.

== Writing career ==
Jillian Lauren is the author of the New York Times bestselling memoir books Everything You Ever Wanted, released May 2015, Some Girls: My Life in a Harem, released in 2010, and the 2011 novel Pretty, all published by Plume/Penguin. Some Girls chronicles her time spent in the harem of the Prince of Brunei.

Lauren's true crime book Behold the Monster: Facing America’s Most Prolific Serial Killer was published by Sourcebooks in 2023. The book is based on the author's extensive interviews with serial killer Samuel Little. Her work attempting to seek justice for Little's victims and match cold cases to him is chronicled in the 2021 five-part documentary series, Confronting a Serial Killer.

Lauren has been a public storyteller in association with The Moth. She did a TEDx Talk about adoption and identity at Chapman University in 2014. From 2012 to 2017, Lauren wrote blog posts at The Huffington Post.

== Personal life ==
Lauren was married to musician Scott Shriner, bass player of the band Weezer. They lived in Los Angeles with two adopted sons. Their first son is a boy from Ethiopia who was adopted on January 23, 2009. Lauren filed for divorce from Shriner on December 2, 2025, citing irreconcilable differences as the reason.

=== 2025 arrest ===
On April 8, 2025, Lauren stepped outside her home during an unrelated police chase involving uniformed Los Angeles Police Department officers in her neighborhood. According to police, she was ordered to drop a handgun but refused, instead pointing it at the officers, at which point she was shot by the police. She then retreated into her home, packed an overnight bag, and was later transported to the hospital with non-life-threatening injuries. She was arrested on suspicion of attempted murder. However, these charges were later changed to assault and negligent discharge of a firearm. In September 2025, Lauren was ruled eligible for mental health diversion and avoided jail time as a result.
