= Natasha Leggero =

American actress and comedian (born 1974)

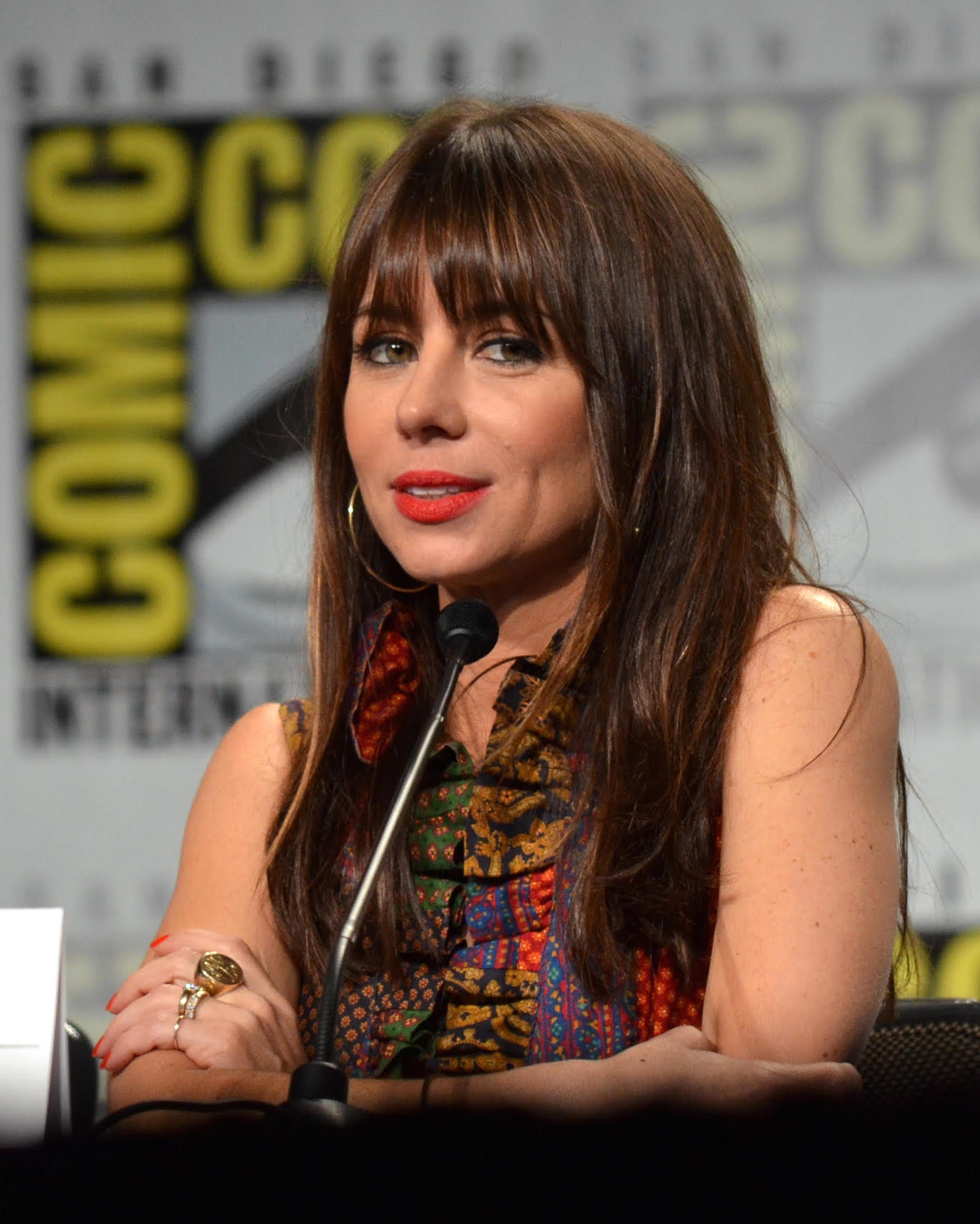
- Natasha Leggero at ComicCon in 2015
- Born: March 26, 1974 (age 52); Rockford, Illinois, U.S
- Education: Hunter College (BA); Stella Adler Studio of Acting
- Spouse: Moshe Kasher (m. 2015)
- Children: 1

Comedy career
- Years active: 2000–present
- Medium: Stand-up; television; film
- Genres: Observational comedy; blue comedy; insult comedy; satire
- Subjects: Social class; celebrity culture
- Website: natashaleggero.com

Natasha Leggero (/ləˈʒɛəroʊ/) (born March 26, 1974) is an American stand-up comedian, actress, and writer. She rose to fame after appearing as the host of the MTV reality television series The 70s House in 2005, and as a regular roundtable panelist on Chelsea Handler's late-night talk show Chelsea Lately from 2008 to 2014.

Leggero created the Comedy Central period sitcom Another Period (2015–2018) with Riki Lindhome, which she starred in as Lillian Abigail Bellacourt, a daughter of the fictional Bellacourt family. As a voice actress, Leggero has starred in several adult animated sitcoms, voicing the roles of Callie Maggotbone in Ugly Americans (2010–2012), Ethel in Brickleberry (2013–2015) and Shannon in Hoops (2020). She also starred in the short-lived NBC sitcom Free Agents (2011) as Emma Parker, in the Showtime comedy series Dice (2016–2017) as Carmen, and in the CBS sitcom Broke (2020) as Elizabeth. In 2022, Leggero released her first book, The World Deserves My Children.

Her observational comedy has been noted by critics for its use of satire, as commentary on such themes as celebrity culture and social class.

== Early life and education ==
Leggero was born on March 26, 1974 (Note: A June 2017 profile in Forbes noted that Leggero was 43 years old. On March 26, 2017, Leggero re-tweeted a "Happy Birthday" wish directed at her from Showtime Networks, which was posted the same day. Her birthdate of March 26 is corroborated by public records available through FamilySearch.) in Rockford, Illinois and is of Italian and Swedish descent. She grew up Roman Catholic but converted to Judaism as an adult.

Commenting on her childhood, Leggero said, "I would say 'we were' lower-middle-class, but I feel like my mom would start crying if she heard that. But my dad was a used-car dealer, and my mother worked in a locksmith shop as the bookkeeper. Then they got divorced, and I do remember, like, nuns bringing us food—like big canned goods... we didn't really go on vacation — ever... I had so many jobs growing up: I mowed lawns; I worked at a grocery store; I had two newspaper routes; I worked at a catering place... I definitely hustled."

Leggero began performing at age 10 in plays at the New American Theatre. She attended Rockford East High School and worked at a grocery store as a teenager. After graduating from high school, she attended Illinois State University on a scholarship where she studied for two years and spent a semester studying abroad in England. She had three jobs while overseas including a job at a pub. While at Illinois State, Leggero auditioned for the Stella Adler Conservatory in Chicago and was accepted into the theater program. She planned to go to Juilliard School. She then went to New York City to attend the conservatory, studying for two years and living in a rent-controlled apartment. She worked at the Whiskey Bar. In 1996, she moved to Sydney, Australia with her then-boyfriend, who nicknamed her "Weiner" and lived there for eight months before returning to New York.

Leggero graduated in 2000 from Hunter College with a B.A. in theater criticism. She said that she paid for her own tuition, and it took nine years for her to finish college. She moved to Los Angeles shortly before the September 11 attacks; she still had her apartment but did not return.

== Career ==
Leggero shot an unaired pilot called The Strip for NBC with Tom Lennon and Ben Garant. Along with Andy Kindler and Greg Giraldo, she was a judge on the 2010 season of NBC's Last Comic Standing, which was hosted by Craig Robinson. She played the role of Emma in NBC's 2011 sitcom Free Agents. From 2010 to January 2012, she co-hosted The Lavender Hour podcast with comedian Duncan Trussell. From 2010 to 2012, she voiced Callie Maggotbone on the animated series Ugly Americans. In 2012, she also appeared in six episodes of NBC's Are You There, Chelsea? as Nikki, who was Rick's (the bar manager's) ex-girlfriend. Leggero was featured in every first-season episode, starting with the second episode "Sloane's Ex". She played the sex-obsessed Haley in the web series Burning Love, a spoof of the TV series The Bachelor and The Bachelorette. In 2013, Leggero appeared in an episode of the Drunk History television series on Comedy Central.

On September 2, 2013, Leggero participated in the Comedy Central Roast of James Franco as one of the roasters. The next day, Brickleberry premiered its second season. She voiced the park ranger Ethel in place of Kaitlin Olson, who only featured in the first season. Tubbin' with Tash debuted on October 2, 2013, on Leggero's YouTube channel. The premise of the show is Leggero interviewing guests while in a hot tub. In August 2015, she debuted her Comedy Central standup special, Live at Bimbo's (originally entitled Diamond P__), which was filmed in San Francisco. In 2015, Leggero and Riki Lindhome created the Comedy Central series Another Period, which they also starred in together. The series premiered on June 23, 2015, and was renewed for a second season, which premiered on June 15, 2016. On May 23, 2016, it was renewed for a third season, which aired in 2018. In 2016 and 2017, Leggero and husband Moshe Kasher embarked on The Honeymoon Tour, in which they performed stand-up shows and provided humorous relationship advice throughout the United States.

Leggero cohosts Rat in the Kitchen on TBS, which premiered on March 31, 2022. Her first book The World Deserves My Children, a collection of essays on motherhood in a post-apocalyptic world, was published by Gallery Books on November 15, 2022.

== Comedic style ==
Leggero's comedy has been characterized as observational, with frequent commentary on celebrity culture and class. Her approach to standup has been noted for its heavy use of persona, which largely relies on costumes and "an air of mock-refinement and elitism." Journalist John Wenzel wrote that Leggero's use of persona allows her to "indict the most bloated, superficial aspects of our culture." Maggie Lange of GQ noted:

All performers have a character to some extent, but Leggero is one of the few with a costume. She's like a wolf in sheep's clothing, but like a seasoned comedian in a socialite's clothing. She's always been this way. Who is the most formally dressed being at every Roast? Natasha Leggero. Who is perhaps the only person to have ever worn long white gloves to the Laugh Factory? Natasha Leggero. It's always like she's going to another party. While other comedians are trying to out-casual each other, she's sitting with impeccable posture, dripping diamonds, dripping disdain.

On January 20, 2024, Leggero surprised an audience at The Improv in Los Angeles, when she flashed the crowd to impersonate comedian Bert Kreischer after his act.

== Personal life ==
Between 2011 and 2012, Leggero dated comedian Duncan Trussell, with whom she co-hosted the podcast, The Lavender Hour.

In 2015 Leggero and Moshe Kasher bought a home in the Silver Lake area of Los Angeles. She married Kasher the same year. During an October 3, 2017 interview with Stephen Colbert, Leggero announced that she and Kasher were expecting their first child. On February 24, 2018, on Instagram, Leggero announced the birth of their daughter via c-section.

== Works ==
=== Stand-up comedy ===
Year	Title	Notes
2011	Comedy Central Presents: Natasha Leggero	Half-hour TV special
2011	Coke Money	Comedy Central audio album
2015	Live at Bimbo's	Comedy Central TV special
2018	The Honeymoon Stand Up Special	Netflix special with Moshe Kasher

=== Talk shows ===
Year	Title	Notes
2013	Tubbin' with Tash	7-episode YouTube web series
2019–present	The Endless Honeymoon Podcast	podcast with Moshe Kasher

== Filmography ==
=== Film ===
Year	Title	Role	Notes
2007	The Exorcist Chronicles	Leah	
2009	He's Just Not That into You	Amber Gnech	
2013	Tome of the Unknown	Beatrice	Short film; pilot for the miniseries Over the Garden Wall
2013	Dealin' with Idiots	Tipsy Jessica	
2014	Neighbors	Prostitute	
2014	Let's Be Cops	Annie	
2015	The Breakup Girl	Kim	
2015	A Better You	Tamara	
2016	The Do-Over	Nikki	
2018	Duck Duck Goose	Jin Jing	Voice
2020	Have a Good Trip: Adventures in Psychedelics	Young Carrie Fisher	
2023	First Time Female Director	Themberly Paris	
2023	Old Dads	Kelly	
2025	The Napa Boys	Annie	
2026	F*ck Valentine's Day	Tricia	
2026	Stop! That! Train!	Person on Phone	

=== Television ===
Year	Title	Role	Notes
2004	The Joe Schmo Show	Rita "The Drunk"	2 episodes
2005	MTV's The 70s House	Dawn	Host; 10 episodes
2005–2008	Reno 911!	Various	3 episodes
2005	Comedy Central Roast of Pamela Anderson	Herself (red carpet interviewer)	Uncredited; Television special
2005	Premium Blend	Herself	Episode: "Johnny Lampert, Roy Wood Jr., Natasha Leggero and Stephen Rannazzisi"
2006	It's Always Sunny in Philadelphia	Stripper #1	Episode: "Charlie Gets Crippled"
2007	'Til Death	Mindy	Episode: "Performance Anxiety"
2007	Red Eye w/Greg Gutfeld	Herself	Guest panelist; episode dated December 8, 2007
2008	Samantha Who?	Female Customer	Episode: "The Gallery Show"
2008	SuperNews!	Hillary Clinton, Sarah Palin	Voice, 2 episodes
2008	The Sarah Silverman Program	Dr. Leggero	Episode: "Vow Wow"
2008	Worst Week	Liz	Episode: "The Gift"
2008–2014	Chelsea Lately	Herself	Guest panelist; various episodes
2009	Aqua Teen Hunger Force	Computer Technician	Voice, episode: "Fry Legs"
2009–2010	The Smoking Gun Presents: World's Dumbest...	Herself	Commentator; 28 episodes
2010	'Til Death	Sandy	Episode: "Snore Loser"
2010	Last Comic Standing	Herself	Judge (season 7); 10 episodes
2010–2011	Nick Swardson's Pretend Time	Various	5 episodes
2010–2012	Ugly Americans	Callie Maggotbone	Voice, main cast (31 episodes)
2011	Comedy Central Presents	Herself	Episode: "Natasha Leggero"
2011	After Lately	Herself	2 episodes
2011	Free Agents	Emma Parker	Main cast; 8 episodes
2012	Are You There, Chelsea?	Nikki Natoli	6 episodes
2012	The Life & Times of Tim	Female Rodney	Voice, 2 episodes
2012	China, IL	Jen	Voice, episode: "Frankensteve"
2012	Regular Show	LaDonna / Girl in Line	Voice, episode: "Access Denied"
2012	NTSF:SD:SUV::	Mona Lisa	Episode: "Time Angels"
2012–2013	The Burn with Jeff Ross	Herself	2 episodes
2013	Whitney	Danielle	Episode: "Lost in Transition"
2013	The Jeselnik Offensive	Panelist	1 episode
2013	Community	Mysti	Episode: "Heroic Origins"
2013	Ghost Ghirls	Sissy	Episode: "Hooker With A Heart of Ghoul"
2013	Arrested Development	Jackie	Episode: "Borderline Personalities"
2013	Drunk History	Herself	Narrator; episode: "San Francisco"
2013	High School USA!	Rachel Lewis	Voice, episode: "Adoption"
2013	Comedy Central Roast of James Franco	Herself (roaster)	Television special
2013	The League	Stand-up teacher	Episode: "The Bringer Show"
2013	Comedy Bang! Bang!	Judy Elevenuda	Episode: "Andy Dick Wears a Black Suit Jacket & Skinny Tie"
2013	Key & Peele	White Woman #2	Episode: "The Power of Wings"
2013	The Birthday Boys	Superintendent	Episode: "Going All the Way"
2013–2014	Betas	Brenda	3 episodes
2013–2014	Lucas Bros. Moving Co.	Natasha	Voice, 3 episodes
2013–2015	Brickleberry	Ethel	Voice, main cast (season 2–3)
2013–2017	@midnight	Herself	7 episodes
2014	Suburgatory	Nora	4 episodes
2014	Inside Amy Schumer	Mia	Episode: "Slut-Shaming"
2014	Clarence	Nature Kate / Heida	Voice, episode: "Nature Clarence"
2014	Garfunkel & Oates	Vivian St. Charles	3 episodes
2015	TripTank	Kim / Female Dog	Voice, 2 episodes
2015	Marry Me	Laguna Matata	Episode: "Spoil Me"
2015	Mulaney	Rodeo	Episode: "Life is a Series of Different Apartments"
2015	Modern Family	Dana	Episode: "Fight or Flight"
2015	The Comedy Central Roast of Justin Bieber	Herself	Television special
2015	Drunk History	Elizabeth Bisland	Episode: "Journalism"
2015–2018	Another Period	Lillian Bellacourt	Main cast, 32 episodes
2016	Superstore	Shoplifter	Episode: "Shoplifter"
2016	BoJack Horseman	Heather	Voice, episode: "Start Spreading the News"
2016–2017	Dice	Carmen	Main cast, 13 episodes
2016–2017	American Dad!	Planet Hollywood Waitress / Karen	Voice, 2 episodes
2017	Justice League Action	Poison Ivy	Voice, 4 episodes
2017–2019	Funny You Should Ask	Herself	98 episodes
2018	Teachers	Honour	Episode: "Leggo My Preggo"
2018	Alone Together	Nora	Episode: "Daypassers"
2018	A Million Little Things	Joyce	Episode: "Christmas Wishlist"
2018	Comedy Knockout	Herself	2 episodes
2019	The Real Bros of Simi Valley	Cheryl	Episode: "Open House"
2019	Star vs. the Forces of Evil	Additional voices	Episode: "Junkin' Janna/A Spell with No Name"
2019	Historical Roasts	Mary Todd Lincoln	Episode: "Abraham Lincoln"
2019	American Princess	Heidi	Episode: "Down There"
2019	Adam Ruins Everything	Music Video Director	Episode: "Adam Ruins Music"
2019	Crank Yankers	Herself	Episode: "Adam Carolla, David Koechner & Natasha Leggero"
2020	AJ and the Queen	Kath	Episode: "Little Rock"
2020	Paradise PD	Ethel	Voice, episode: "Paradise PD Meets Brickleberry"
2020	The Midnight Gospel	Peggy	Voice, episode: "Taste of the King"
2020	Broke	Elizabeth	Main cast, 13 episodes
2020	Hoops	Shannon	Voice, main cast (10 episodes)
2022	Fast Foodies	Herself	Season 2, episode 3
2022	Rat in the Kitchen	Herself	Host; TV series
2022	Monster High: The Movie	Skullette	Voice, television film
2023	The Great American Joke Off	Herself	Recurring panelist, various episodes
2023	Stars on Mars	Herself	Contestant, 4 episodes
2023	Monster High 2	Skullette	Voice, television film
2023	Snake Oil	Herself	Celebrity advisor, 2 episodes
2024	Hacks	Herself	Episode: "The Roast of Deborah Vance"
2024	Rock Paper Scissors	Controller of Cool	Voice, episode: "Pogo Sticks"
2025	Poker Face	Lily Bricatino	Episode: "The Big Pump"
2025	Bat-Fam	Killer Frost	Voice
2025	Celebrity Weakest Link	Herself	Contestant, episode: "Roastmasters"
2026	Newlyweds	Cassidy	Episode: "Thanksgiving"

=== Video games ===
Year	Title	Role	Other notes
2011	Ugly Americans: Apocalypsegeddon	Callie Maggotbone, Desdemona	Voice

=== Web ===
Year	Title	Role	Notes
2006	Fire Guys	Black Ladder Team leader	Episode 3
2012	Escape My Life	Skylar Browning	8 episodes
2012–2013	Burning Love	Haley	14 episodes
2015	The Joe Rogan Experience	Herself	Podcast episode 653
2015	The Adam Carolla Show	Herself	Podcast May 31
2015	Limbo	Lucy / Lucifer	Independent short film
2016	WTF with Marc Maron	Herself	Episode 707
2022	The Bald and the Beautiful	Herself	Podcast episode 92
2023	Bertcast	Herself	Podcast episode 553
