= Mike Rosenstein =

American film and television producer

- Other names: Michael J. Rosenstein
- Occupation: Producer
- Years active: 2012–present
- Organization: Sunset Rose Pictures
- Notable work: Have a Good Trip, Burning Love, The Eric Andre Show, Zoolander 2
- Awards: Primetime Emmy Award nominee (2024)

Mike Rosenstein (also known as Michael J. Rosenstein) is an Emmy-nominated American film and television producer known for his work with comedian Eric André and actor-director Ben Stiller, who describes him as an "edgy, groundbreaking and unique" producer in LA's comedy scene.

== Career ==
Rosenstein began his career working with Ben Stiller at Red Hour Films, where he developed and produced comedy projects. He later founded Sunset Rose Pictures, a production and financing company.

Rosenstein’s producing credits include Zoolander 2 directed by Ben Stiller, and numerous comedy specials for Eric André, Reggie Watts, Bridget Everett, Paul Scheer, and Rob Huebel.

Rosenstein produced and financed the Netflix original documentary Have a Good Trip: Adventures in Psychedelics, directed by Donick Cary and featuring appearances from Ben Stiller, Sarah Silverman, A$AP Rocky, Adam Scott, Sting, Nick Offerman, Natasha Lyonne, and others. The film premiered on Netflix on May 11, 2020.

He worked extensively with Eric André on The Eric Andre Show, including the 2023 season that was nominated for an Emmy Award for Outstanding Short Form Comedy Series, as well as the stand up special Legalize Everything.

== Filmography ==
Year	Title	Role	Notes
2012–2013	Burning Love	Executive Producer, Producer	TV Series, 31 episodes
2013–2014	The Birthday Boys	Executive Producer	TV Series, 20 episodes
2014	Next Time on Lonny	Executive Producer	TV Series, 10 episodes
2014–2016	The Meltdown with Jonah and Kumail	Executive Producer	TV Series, 24 episodes
2015	Big Time in Hollywood, FL	Executive Producer	TV Mini Series, 10 episodes
2015	Crash Test: With Rob Huebel and Paul Scheer	Executive Producer	TV Movie
2016	Zoolander 2	Associate Producer	Feature Film
2016	Zoolander: Super Model	Executive Producer	TV Movie
2016	Reggie Watts: Spatial	Executive Producer	TV Special
2018	Portraits with Yung Jake	Executive Producer	TV Series
2018–2019	The Real Bros of Simi Valley	Executive Producer	TV Series, 10 episodes
2020	Have a Good Trip	Producer	Netflix Documentary
2020	Eric Andre: Legalize Everything	Executive Producer	Netflix Comedy Special
2023	The Eric Andre Show	Executive Producer	TV Series, 10 episodes
2024	Eric André Live Near Broadway	Producer	TV Special
2025	The Napa Boys	Producer	Feature Film, Upcoming
