= Neal Brennan =

American comedian and writer (born 1973)

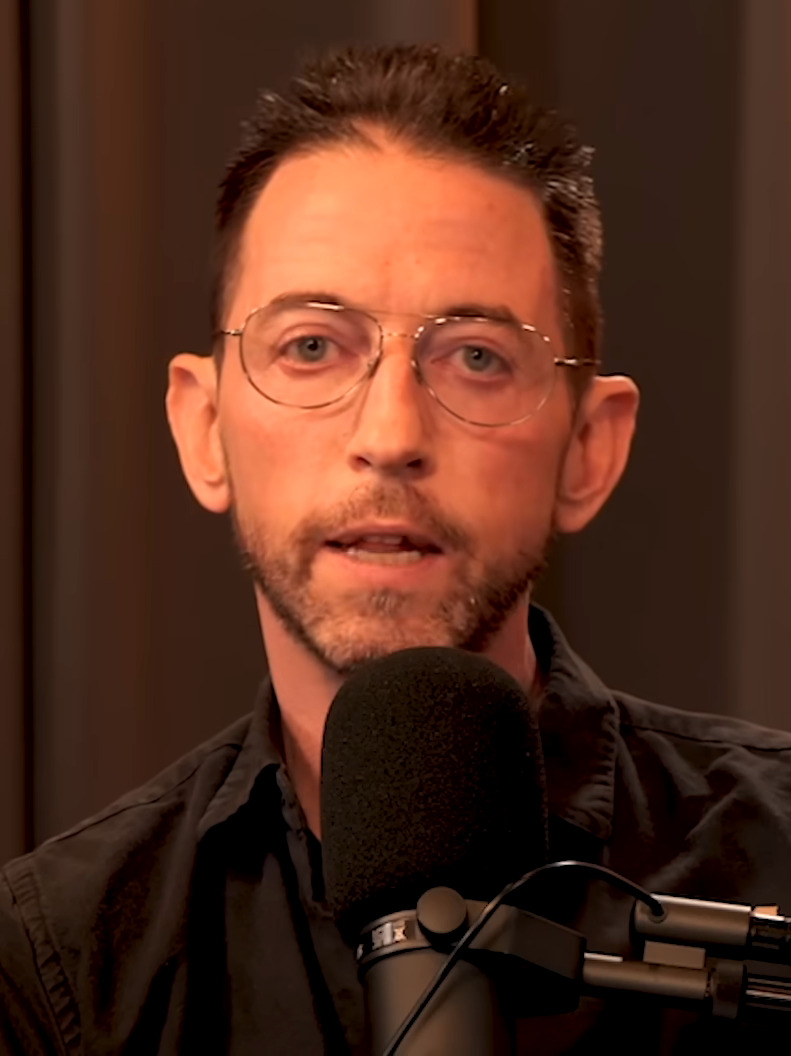
- Brennan in 2024
- Born: October 19, 1973 (age 53); Villanova, Pennsylvania, U.S.
- Relatives: Kevin Brennan (brother)

Comedy career
- Years active: 1995–present
- Medium: Stand-up; television; film; podcast
- Genres: Observational comedy; surreal humor; sketch comedy; black comedy; blue comedy; satire
- Subjects: American politics; American culture; pop culture; racism; race relations; recreational drug use; human sexuality; morality; mental health
- Website: www.nealbrennan.com

Neal Brennan (born October 19, 1973) is an American comedian and podcaster. He is best known for co-creating and co-writing the Comedy Central series Chappelle's Show (2003–2006) with Dave Chappelle and for his Netflix stand-up comedy special 3 Mics (2017).

== Early life ==
Brennan was born in Villanova, Pennsylvania, on October 19, 1973, the youngest of ten children born into a family of Irish Catholic descent. He lived in Villanova until the age of six, moving with his family in 1978 to Wilmette, Illinois. According to Brennan, his father's side of the family was funny, as were his five older brothers. He has said that he realized he was funny and liked comedy at about eight or nine years of age, and had already been performing material for his classmates in a style that emulated comedians David Brenner, Richard Lewis, and Jerry Seinfeld. He watched a large amount of comedy on TV during his high school years, often staying up late to see Late Night with David Letterman and The Arsenio Hall Show.

Brennan's older brother Kevin became a comedian and writer who started doing stand-up comedy while Brennan was still in high school. Brennan would spend weekends attending Kevin's performances at The Improv in New York City, where he would meet comedians such as Dave Attell, David Juskow, Ray Romano, and Mike Royce. He said in an interview with Independent Film Channel (IFC) that after watching his brother do stand-up, he realized it was possible to make a living in comedy. He moved to New York to attend film school at NYU, but he dropped out after a year. He began as a doorman at the now-defunct Boston Comedy Club in Greenwich Village where he met frequent performer Dave Chappelle. The two became friends and Brennan would often pitch jokes to Chappelle. Brennan also shared an apartment with comedian Jay Mohr while living in New York.

== Career ==
=== Early career ===
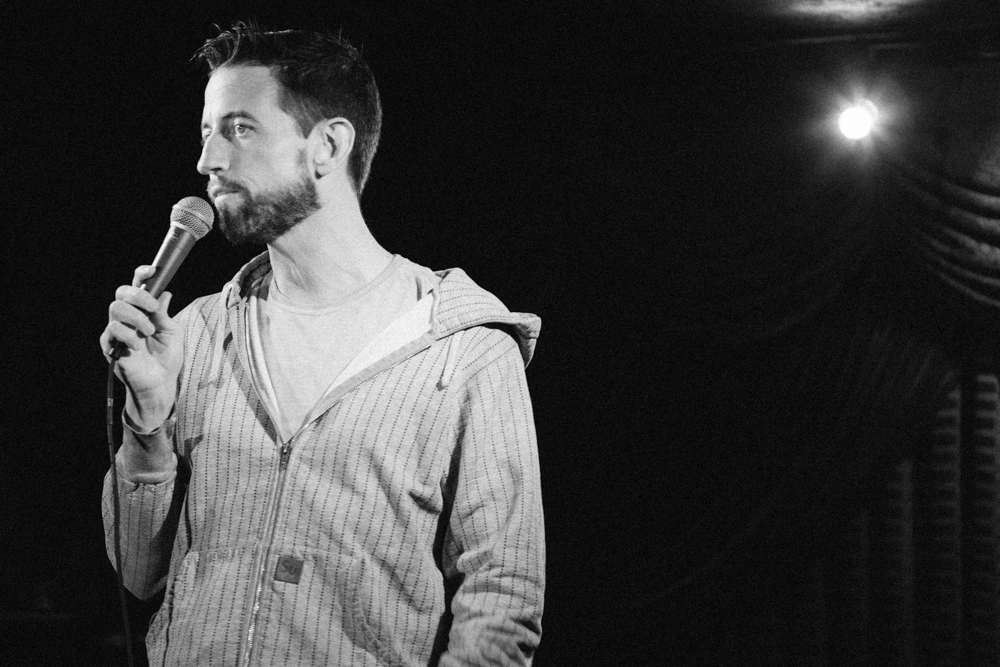
Brennan performing in April 2013

After six months of working as a doorman at the Boston Comedy Club, Brennan first performed stand-up in 1992, at 18 years of age. He later recounted that he "got no laughs" and did not perform stand-up again for five years. He also wrote for The Source magazine in 1992.

In the mid-1990s Brennan moved to Los Angeles. In 1995, he became a writer for the dating show Singled Out which was hosted by Jenny McCarthy and Chris Hardwick. This was followed by writing jobs for the game show Bzzz! in 1996, the sketch comedy-variety show All That from 1996 to 1997, and the teen sitcom Kenan & Kel in 1997.

In 1997, Brennan and Dave Chappelle collaborated for the first time on the screenplay for the film Half Baked. The film was released in January 1998 and starred Chappelle, Jim Breuer, Harland Williams, and Guillermo Díaz. Half Baked was a commercial failure and received mainly negative reviews but has become a cult classic.

In a 2006 interview, Brennan referred to the period of the film's release as "probably the worst year of my life, creatively and personally." In an interview that same year on Inside the Actors Studio, Chappelle recounted how he and Brennan lost touch with each other after the release of Half Baked, saying that it was "like leaving a crime scene".

=== Chappelle's Show ===
Brennan and Chappelle came together to co-create, co-write, and co-executive produce the eponymous sketch comedy Chappelle's Show which premiered in January 2003. Brennan said that he and Chappelle read the book Live from New York: An Uncensored History of Saturday Night Live (2002), by Tom Shales when they started writing sketches for the show, and found the book very helpful. The duo wrote the show's sketches with minimal outside help and agreed never to divulge who was responsible for writing which sketch.

Brennan directed some sketches in the show's second season, including the sketch featuring Chappelle as musician Rick James. Brennan was nominated for three Emmy Awards in 2004 for his work on the show as a director, writer and producer. By the end of its second season Chappelle's Show was Comedy Central's highest-rated program.

Members of the musical group the Roots worked as music directors on the second and third seasons of the show. Brennan later recommended the band to Jimmy Fallon as his house band on Late Night with Jimmy Fallon.

Chappelle's Show was doing well and Chappelle had signed a $50 million deal in 2004 to produce two more seasons, but he abruptly left the show in April 2005 prior to the premiere of the show's third season. He left without warning Brennan or others of the show's crew. As a result, the premiere of season three was delayed; Brennan compiled the remaining sketches and aired them in July 2006 as the "lost episodes."

=== The Champs podcast ===
In 2011, Brennan, comedian Moshe Kasher, and DJ Douggpound (Doug Lussenhop) started a podcast called The Champs. Kasher said of the podcast: "It's Doug dropping sound effects and beats over me and Neal kind of hosting an hour of ridiculous chat. We have a rotating black guy guest, there's a different black guest every week." Guests on the show included actor/comedians Wayne Brady, Chris Rock, Mario Joyner, Shawn and Marlon Wayans, David Alan Grier, adult film star Lexington Steele, rapper Too $hort, and professional basketball player Blake Griffin. On occasion the show has strayed from its regular format with guests such as comedian and actor Bobby Lee, former pornographic actress Sasha Grey, former Major League Baseball player Jose Canseco, and comedian/actor Aziz Ansari. In 2014 The Champs was named "Best Podcast" as part of LA Weekly's "Best of L.A." issue. The podcast ended in 2016.

=== 3 Mics ===
In 2015, Brennan developed and performed a comedy show, 3 Mics, in Los Angeles. He brought it to New York City in 2016, opening on March 3 at the Lynn Redgrave Theater. The show features Brennan alternating between three microphones; he uses the first microphone to read one-liners from index cards, the second microphone to talk about dealing with depression and his relationship with his father, and the third microphone to perform traditional stand-up comedy. In 2017, 3 Mics was released as a Netflix original comedy special.

=== How Neal Feel podcast ===
In 2019, Brennan and his friend Bianca Siavoshy started a podcast called How Neal Feel. The duo interviewed several of Brennan's friends including Jimmy Carr, Blake Griffin, Adam Levine, and Chris Rock on the weekly podcast that largely consisted of the duo talking about current events and their personal lives. Features on the show included Doc Watch, in which they discuss documentaries; Neal's Gon' 'Pologize, in which Neal apologizes for saying something offensive; Dumb Purchase, where Neal shares frivolous purchases; and Emails, a segment in which Bianca and Neal respond to questions and comments from listeners.

=== Unacceptable ===
In August 2021, Brennan's one-man show Unacceptable debuted at New York City's Cherry Lane Theater with acclaimed magician, author, artist Derek DelGaudio as director. Upon the close of the show in November 2021, Brennan announced that the show would tour in 2022. It was released on Netflix in 2022, titled Neal Brennan: Blocks.

=== Blocks podcast ===
In December 2022 Brennan started a new podcast (at the suggestion of his friend, Jimmy Carr) with an episode with David Letterman. It follows the same format as his Netflix special (of the same name) in that he asks his guests about aspects of their life that leave them isolated or lonely and how they overcome these “blocks”.

=== Other work ===
In 2006, Brennan directed and co-wrote the made-for-TV movie Totally Awesome. He directed the 2009 film The Goods. In 2011, he directed a series of commercials for the ESPYs.

As an actor, Brennan had small roles in the films Half Baked and Get Him to the Greek. He also appeared in various sketches on Chappelle's Show. Brennan has also written comedy material for the 83rd Academy Awards, as well as for Seth Meyers's speech at the White House Correspondents' Dinner in 2011.

Brennan continues to perform stand-up regularly in the Los Angeles area as well as nationally. He has also appeared on Last Call with Carson Daly, Late Night with Jimmy Fallon, Lopez Tonight, and Conan. In 2013, Brennan directed 10 episodes of Inside Amy Schumer.

In 2016, he became a regular writer and contributor to The Daily Show as "Trevor's friend Neal".

On October 10, 2019, he was featured in a 30-minute YouTube documentary created by SoulPancake in collaboration with Funny or Die called Laughing Matters, wherein a variety of comedians discuss mental health.

== Influences ==
Brennan has said that his comedy influences are Chris Rock, Mort Sahl, Dave Attell, Mike Royce, and David Juskow.

== Personal life ==
Brennan described himself as an atheist in July 2011, but stated in November 2020 that he is no longer an atheist after using ayahuasca several times. Brennan is the younger brother of stand-up comedian and podcaster Kevin Brennan.

Brennan has had a 25-year struggle with depression that saw him on medication and researching and trying various treatments (including going to China for transcranial magnetic stimulation). In an episode of his Blocks podcast he puts comedian Jimmy Carr in the host's seat and they discuss how he was helped by use of ayahuasca.

== Filmography ==
=== Television ===
Year	Title	Role	Notes
1996	Singled Out	Writer	
1996–1997	All That	Writer	
1997	Kenan & Kel	Writer	
2003–2004	Chappelle's Show	Creator, writer, director	
2006	Totally Awesome	Writer, director	
2012	The Half Hour	Performer and writer	Episode: "Neal Brennan"
2012	Attack of the Show!	Host	
2014	Neal Brennan: Women and Black Dudes	Performer, writer, director	
2014–present	The Approval Matrix	Host	
2013	Inside Amy Schumer	Director	
2016–present	The Daily Show with Trevor Noah	Himself (contributor)	
2017	Neal Brennan: 3 Mics	Performer, writer, director	Netflix Special
2018	Comedians in Cars Getting Coffee	Featured guest	Episode: "Red Bottom Shoes Equals Fantastic Babies"
2019	Comedians of the World	Performer and writer	Episode: "Neal Brennan"
2019	Seth Meyers: Lobby Baby	Director	Netflix Special
2020	The Comedy Store	Himself	
2022	Neal Brennan: Blocks	Performer, writer	Netflix Special
2024	Neal Brennan: Crazy Good	Performer, writer	Netflix Special
2024	Seth Meyers: Dad Man Walking	Director	HBO/Max

=== Film ===
- Half Baked, writer (1998)
- The Goods: Live Hard, Sell Hard, director (2009)
- Get Him to the Greek, actor (2010)
- The Female Brain, writer, actor (2017)
- The Opening Act, actor (2020)
- Capone, actor (2020)
