= Womp It Up! =

Comedy podcast

WOMP It Up
- Genre: Comedy/improv
- Language: English

Cast and voices
- Hosted by: Marissa Wompler (Jessica St. Clair); Charlotte Listler (Lennon Parham)
- Voices: Various

Production
- Length: 60 minutes

Publication
- No. of episodes: 91
- Original release: April 20, 2015 – May 7, 2021
- Provider: Earwolf
- Updates: Biweekly

Related
- Website: www.earwolf.com/show/womp-it-up/

Womp It Up! (stylized as WOMP It Up!) is a comedy podcast hosted by Jessica St. Clair and Lennon Parham, in character as high school student Marissa Wompler and her Stars program teacher Charlotte Listler. The podcast premiered on the Earwolf network in April 2015; its last podcast was on May 7, 2021.

== History ==
The characters of Marissa Wompler and Charlotte Listler originated on the Comedy Bang! Bang! podcast, with Wompler first appearing in 2010, and Listler joining her in 2012. After several Comedy Bang! Bang! appearances, Scott Aukerman suggested that the duo launch their own podcast. Other characters from Comedy Bang! Bang! have made appearances on WOMP It Up!, including Andy Daly's "Joe Bongo" and Paul F. Tompkins's "Mike the Janitor" characters.

We had been doing the Womptacular specials, where we would just get, like, every single person, and everyone would play, like, four different characters, and it was insanity from the get-go. Those were doing really well, and so then we thought, "Well, we could just do it the way we do our show," which is, every week we have another of our incredibly funny friends play something that they think would fit into the world.

— Lennon Parham

== Episodes ==
No.	Title	Special guest(s)	Original release date
1	"Spotlight On: Dr. Lionel Drioche"	Eric "Gutterballs" Gutterman (Jason Mantzoukas), Dr. Lionel Drioche (Seth Morris)	April 20, 2015
2	"Spotlight On: Lil' Nicky"	Lil' Nicky (Chris Gethard)	May 4, 2015
3	"Spotlight On: Mr. Jordache"	Mr. Jordache (Neil Casey)	May 18, 2015
4	"Spotlight On: Dr. Dennis Endercut and Principal Sanders"	Marissa's Step Dad Seth (Brian Huskey), Principal Sanders (Miriam Tolan), Dr. Dennis Endercut (Brian Stack)	June 1, 2015
5	"Spotlight On: Mr. Joe Bongo"	Health Teacher Mr. Joe Bongo (Andy Daly)	June 15, 2015
6	"Spotlight On: Dustin Dusty Magaway"	Mr. Dustin Dusty Magaway (Eugene Cordero)	June 29, 2015
7	"Spotlight On: Mike the Janitor"	Mike the Janitor (Paul F. Tompkins)	July 13, 2015
8	"LIVE From UCB-Sunset"	Scott Aukerman, Marissa's Step Dad Seth (Brian Huskey), Marissa's Mother Diane (Michaela Watkins)	July 27, 2015
9	"Spotlight On: Nathan Ponsor"	Daily Dolphin Lifestyle Editor Nathan Ponsor (Erik Tanouye)	August 10, 2015
10	"Spotlight On: Eric Gutterballs Gutterman"	Eric "Gutterballs" Gutterman (Jason Mantzoukas)	August 26, 2015
11	"Spotlight On: Becca Foster"	Becca Foster (Tara Copeland)	September 7, 2015
12	"Spotlight On: Donna Delpepio"	Donna "Pep" Delpepio (Jessica Chaffin)	September 21, 2015
13	"Spotlight On: Red Morrison"	Guidance Counselor Red Morrison (Tony Hale)	November 16, 2015
14	"Spotlight On: Rhonda DeLuce"	Humanities Teacher Rhonda Deluce (Danielle Schneider)	November 30, 2015
15	"Spotlight On: Matt Yanni"	Marissa's Pittsburgh Boyfriend Matt Yanni (Jon Daly)	December 14, 2015
16	"Spotlight On: Mrs. Patti Raper"	Substitute Teacher, Mrs. Patti Raper (Jamie Denbo)	December 28, 2015
17	"Spotlight On: Chet Noseworthy"	Class President, Chet Noseworthy (Jack McBrayer)	January 11, 2016
18	"Spotlight On: Mr. Dan Tennis"	Computer Teacher, Mr. Dan Tennis (Andrew Barbot)	January 25, 2016
19	"Spotlight On: B.B."	Local Drug Dealer B.B. (Matt Besser)	February 8, 2016
20	"Spotlight On: Gary Wasikowski"	Gym Teacher Gary Wasikowski (Kyle Bornheimer)	February 23, 2016
21	"Spotlight On: Mr. Casey Steers"	School Newspaper Head Mr. Casey Steers (Paul Scheer)	November 28, 2017
22	"Spotlight On: Alexa Crobble"	Alexa Crobble (Lauren Weedman)	December 5, 2017
23	"Spotlight On: Eric "Gutterballs" Gutterman Again"	Eric "Gutterballs" Gutterman (Jason Mantzoukas)	December 12, 2017
24	"Spotlight On: Marissa Willard"	New Student Marissa Willard (Casey Wilson)	December 19, 2017
25	"Spotlight On: Chuck Turlinski"	Home school student Chuck Turlinksi (Brad Morris)	December 26, 2017
26	"Spotlight On: Mr. Glen Butterman"	Head of PAW Patrol Glen Butterman (Rob Huebel)	January 2, 2018
27	"Spotlight On: Sanjie Walker"	Sanjie Walker (Marcy Jarreau)	January 9, 2018
28	"Spotlight On: Seth Wompler"	Marissa's stepdad Seth Wompler (Brian Huskey)	January 16, 2018
29	"Live from Largo"	Eric "Gutterballs" Gutterman (Jason Mantzoukas), Marissa's stepdad Seth (Brian Huskey), Health/Sex Ed instructor Joe Bongo (Andy Daly), Humanities instructor Rhonda DeLuce (Danielle Schneider), and head of the Theatre department Dr. Lionel Drioche (Seth Morris)	January 23, 2018
30	"Spotlight On: Dr. Dennis Denton"	Dr. Dennis Denton (Nick Kroll)	January 30, 2018
31	"Spotlight On: Ashton Whispers"	New student Ashton Whispers (Don Fanelli)	February 6, 2018
32	"Spotlight On: Mary Beth Walter"	Job fair recruiter Mary Beth Walter (Pamela Murphy)	February 13, 2018
33	"Spotlight On: Denise Fawmnst"	Denise Fawmnst (Katie Dippold)	February 20, 2018
34	"Spotlight On: Miss Twerck"	Art teacher Miss Twerck (Julie Brister)	February 27, 2018
35	"Spotlight On: Coach Kevin Alamo"	Football coach Kevin Alamo (Chris Kula)	March 6, 2018
36	"Spotlight On: Kent O’Yellow"	Kent O’Yellow (Shaun Diston)	March 13, 2018
37	"Spotlight On: Judy Toots"	Librarian Judy Toots (Mary Holland)	March 20, 2018
38	"Spotlight On: Scott Plummer and Mickey Braskin"	District representatives Scott Plummer and Mickey Braskin (Sklar Brothers)	March 27, 2018
39	"Spotlight On: Maximillian Burger III"	Maximillian Burger III (Brandon Gardner)	April 3, 2018
40	"Spotlight On: Traci Reardon"	Traci Reardon (Lauren Lapkus)	April 10, 2018
41	"Spotlight On: Dr. Gregory Cotton"	Choir teacher Dr. Gregory Cotton (Zeke Nicholson)	April 17, 2018
42	"Spotlight On: Jenelle Pierce"	Conflict resolution counselor Jenelle Pierce (Jean Villepique)	April 24, 2018
43	"Spotlight On: Ken Manuel Miranda"	Ken Manuel Miranda (Anthony King)	May 1, 2018
44	"Spotlight On: Simon the Street Urchin"	Simon (D'Arcy Carden)	May 8, 2018
45	"Live from Largo"	Eric "Gutterballs" Gutterman (Jason Mantzoukas), Marissa's stepdad Seth (Brian Huskey), boyfriend Bruce Almighty (Matt Walsh), rival Traci Reardon (Lauren Lapkus)	May 15, 2018
46	"Spotlight On: Senor Guillermo Guillermo Rodriguez"	Senor Guillermo Guillermo Rodriguez (Tony Rodriguez)	May 22, 2018
47	"Spotlight On: Randall Foote"	Randall Foote (Kevin Sussman)	May 29, 2018
48	"Spotlight On: Billy Reck"	Billy Reck (Brian Gallivan)	June 5, 2018
49	"Spotlight On: Dominus Templeton"	Dominus Templeton (Owen Burke)	June 12, 2018
50	"Spotlight On: Candace B. Hapnen"	Candace B. Hapnen (Oscar Montoya)	June 19, 2018
51	"Spotlight On: Nurse Frank Teeple"	Nurse Frank Teeple (John Flynn)	June 26, 2018
52	"Live from Largo"	Mr. Joe Bongo (Andy Daly), Rhonda DeLuce (Danielle Schneider), Dr. Lionel Drioche (Seth Morris), Marissa Willard (Casey Wilson)	July 3, 2018
53	"Spotlight On: Uncle Tammy"	Uncle Tammy (Jen Caldwell)	July 10, 2018
54	"Live from DCM 2018"	Eric "Gutterballs" Gutterman (Jason Mantzoukas), Chet Noseworthy (Jack McBrayer), Seth Wompler (Brian Huskey), C.S. Steers (Paul Scheer), Matt Yanni (Jon Daly)	July 17, 2018
55	"Spotlight On: Gary Gove Jensen"	Gary Gove Jensen (Greg Hess)	July 24, 2018
56	"Spotlight On: Ms. Suze Sackrider"	Ms. Suze Sackrider (Beth Dover)	July 31, 2018
57	"Ask Jess & Lennon"	N/A	August 7, 2018
58	"Listler's Love Lockdown"	N/A	August 14, 2018
59	"Spotlight On: Chris Gainz"	Chris Gainz (Jon Gabrus)	August 21, 2018
60	"Spotlight On: Monty Sutton and Bront LeFleur"	Monty Sutton (Jessica McKenna), Bront LeFleur (Zach Reino)	August 28, 2018
61	"Listler's Love Lockdown"	N/A	September 3, 2018
62	"Spotlight On: Shirley Baskets & Aunt Lotti"	Shirley Baskets (Rebekka Johnson), Aunt Lotti (Kimmy Gatewood)	September 10, 2018
63	"Spotlight On: Glen-Garry Glen Schmaltz"	Glen-Garry Glen Schmaltz (Dan O'Brien)	September 17, 2018
64	"Spotlight On: Dove Washington"	Dove Washington (Nicole Byer)	September 24, 2018
65	"Spotlight On: Seth Wompler Again"	Seth Wompler (Brian Huskey)	October 1, 2018
66	"Spotlight On: Lil' Nicky Again"	Lil' Nicky (Chris Gethard)	October 8, 2018
67	"Spotlight On: Bing Sumito"	Bing Sumito (Kulap Vilaysack)	October 15, 2018
68	"Spotlight On: Lunchlady Mary Frank"	Mary Frank (Natasha Rothwell)	October 22, 2018
69	"Spotlight On: Marinetta Papahimona"	Marinetta Papahimona (Mano Agapion)	October 29, 2018
70	"Spotlight On: Dr. Cheryl Myers & Mr. Joe Chantae"	Dr. Cheryl Myers (Stephnie Weir), Joe Chantae (Bob Dassie)	November 5, 2018
71	"Spotlight On: Tara Trout"	Tara Trout (Beth Appel)	November 12, 2018
72	"Spotlight On: Sheline Lion"	Sheline Lion (Janet Varney)	November 20, 2018
73	"Spotlight On: Big Grande’s Teacher’s Lounge with Sam Weatherman, Todd Padre, Howard Levi’s, and Bill Cravy"	Sam Weatherman (Ryan Rosenberg), Todd Padre (Dan Lippert), Howard Levi’s (Jon Mackey), Bill Cravy (Drew Tarver)	November 26, 2018
74	"Spotlight On: Cory Damron"	Cory Damron (Michael McDonald)	December 3, 2018
75	"Spotlight On: Mr. Vibe"	Mr. Vibe (John Ross Bowie)	December 10, 2018
76	"Spotlight On: Madman McCullough and Nice Jones"	Madman McCullough (Sean Clements), Nice Jones (Hayes Davenport)	December 17, 2018
77	"A Very Special Listler’s Love Lockdown"	N/A	December 24, 2018
78	"Spotlight On: Dr. Lionel Drioche (re-release)"	Eric "Gutterballs" Gutterman (Jason Mantzoukas), Dr. Lionel Drioche (Seth Morris)	January 1, 2019
79	"Spotlight On: Dr. Bill Doyle"	Dr. Bill Doyle (Ben Rodgers)	January 7, 2019
80	"Spotlight On: Mr. Pat"	Mr. Pat (Bobby Moynihan)	January 14, 2019
81	"WOMP It Up! Best Of Guests"	Various	January 21, 2019
82	"Spotlight On: Mike the Janitor (re-release)"	Mike the Janitor (Paul F. Tompkins)	January 28, 2019
83	"Spotlight On: Dr. Mark Claybourne"	Dr. Mark Claybourne (Matt Walsh)	February 4, 2019
84	"Spotlight On: Don Haypen"	Don Haypen (Bryan Safi)	February 11, 2019
85	"Spotlight On: Dobby Teacups"	Dobby Teacups (Dave Theune)	February 18, 2019
86	"Spotlight On: Raven"	Raven (Shannon O’Neill)	February 25, 2019
87	"Spotlight On: Eric "Gutterballs" Gutterman Again"	Eric "Gutterballs" Gutterman (Jason Mantzoukas)	March 4, 2019
88	"Spotlight On: Duncan Petway"	Duncan Petway (Tim Meadows)	March 11, 2019
89	"Live From SF SKETCHFEST"	Eric "Gutterballs" Gutterman (Jason Mantzoukas), Dr. Lionel Drioche (Seth Morris), Coach Bill Coach (Carl Tart).	March 31, 2020
90	"Transmission from Sicily"	N/A	March 23, 2021
91	"Spotlight On: Barry Miller"	Barry Miller (Jeff Hiller)	April 20, 2021
92	"Spotlight On: Scott Aukerman"	Scott Aukerman	May 7, 2021
