= Luka Jones =

American actor (born 1975)

- Born: Luka Yovetich; August 18, 1975 (age 51); Evanston, Illinois, U.S.
- Education: University of Kansas (BA); California State University, Los Angeles (MA); University of Southern California (DPhil)
- Occupations: Actor, comedian

Luka Yovetich (born August 18, 1975), known professionally as Luka Jones, is an American actor and comedian, best known for co-starring in the NBC sitcoms Best Friends Forever and Up All Night.

== Early life and education ==
Jones was born in Evanston, Illinois and raised in the Chicago and Denver metro areas. He graduated from the University of Kansas. He later earned his master's degree in philosophy from California State University, Los Angeles and his doctorate in philosophy from the University of Southern California. Jones studied acting at the Atlantic Theater Company in New York City and the Steppenwolf Theatre Company in Chicago. He studied improv and has been a regular performer at both I.O. West and the Upright Citizens Brigade Theater in Los Angeles.

== Career ==
In 2012, Jones co-starred as Joe, one of the lead characters on the short-lived NBC comedy series Best Friends Forever, alongside Jessica St. Clair and Lennon Parham. Afterwards he joined the cast of NBC's Up All Night as a series regular in its second season, playing the role of Scott, Reagan's (Christina Applegate) younger brother.

Jones joined the ensemble cast of People of Earth in 2016 as Gerry Johnson, "an amiable social dropout, tollbooth worker and enthusiastic expert on all things alien".

== Filmography ==
=== Film ===
Year	Title	Role	Notes
2012	The Campaign	Biker Guy	
2013	The Pretty One	Patrick	
2013	Her	Lewman	
2015	The Dramatics: A Comedy	Gun Store Owner	
2015	Always Worthy	Eddie	
2015	Goosebumps	Mover #2	Uncredited
2016	Dean	Toby	
2017	Izzy Gets the F*ck Across Town	Leo	
2018	In a Relationship	Ash	
2021	Curious George: Cape Ahoy	Rocco	Voice
2022	Bar Fight!	Allen	

=== Television ===
Year	Title	Role	Notes
2011	How I Met Your Mother	Nick	Episode: "The Best Man"
2012	CollegeHumor Originals	Knight / Bar Patron	Episode: "Wings of a Dragon"
2012	Best Friends Forever	Joe Foley	Main role; 6 episodes
2012	Up All Night	Scott Chafin	Main role; 11 episodes Season 2 only
2013	Ben and Kate	Lance	Episode: "Bake Off"
2013	Modern Family	Dustin	Episode: "The Future Dunphys"
2013	Ghost Ghirls	Brian	Episode: "Will You Scary Me?"
2013	Holding Patterns	Lindsey	Unsold pilot
2014	Bad Teacher	Chef Asher	Episode: "Nix the Fat Week"
2014	Really	Fred	Episode: "Pilot"
2015	Casual	Dave	Episode: "Dave"
2015	Comedy Bang! Bang!	Pierce Handmight	Episode: "Adam Pally Wears a Navy Blazer and Bright Blue Sneakers"
2016–2017	People of Earth	Gerry Johnson	Main role; 20 episodes
2017	Michael Bolton's Big, Sexy Valentine's Day Special	Wally	Television special
2017	I Love Dick	John Willis	Episode: "A Short History of Weird Girls"
2017	Pillow Talk	Max	4 episodes
2019	SMILF	Sully	Episode: "Single Mom is Losing Faith"
2019–2021	Shrill	Ryan	Main role; 16 episodes
2021	Birdgirl	—N/a	Episode: "Pilot"
2021	Cinema Toast	Willy	Episode: "After the End"
