= Scot Armstrong =

American screenwriter, director, and producer

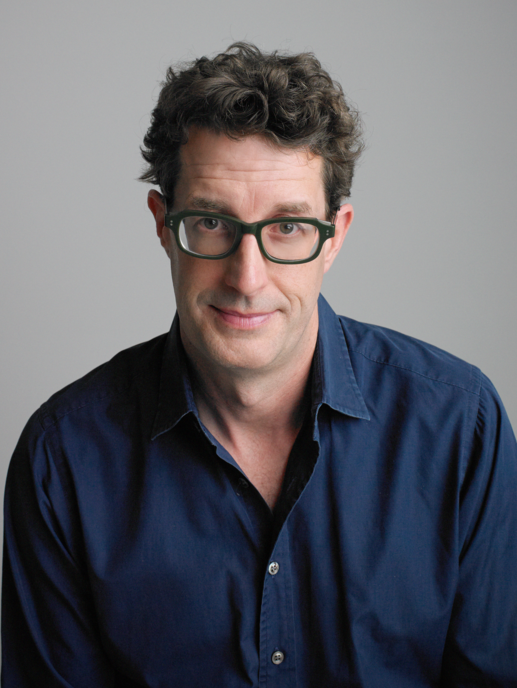
- Born: September 22, 1970 (age 55)
- Occupations: Screenwriter; Director; Producer
- Known for: Dice; The Hangover Part II; Semi-Pro; Old School

Scot Armstrong is an American screenwriter, director, and producer. He is credited with writing or co-writing numerous comedy films, including Old School, The Hangover Part II, Semi-Pro, Road Trip, and many others. He is also the writer and director of the 2015 film, Search Party. The film was released in the US in May 2016. Also in 2016, his TV series, Dice, premiered on Showtime.

== Early life ==
Armstrong grew up in Wheaton, Illinois, in the western suburbs of Chicago. He attended Wheaton North High School where he wrestled. For his higher education, Armstrong enrolled in Bradley University in Peoria, Illinois.

== Career ==
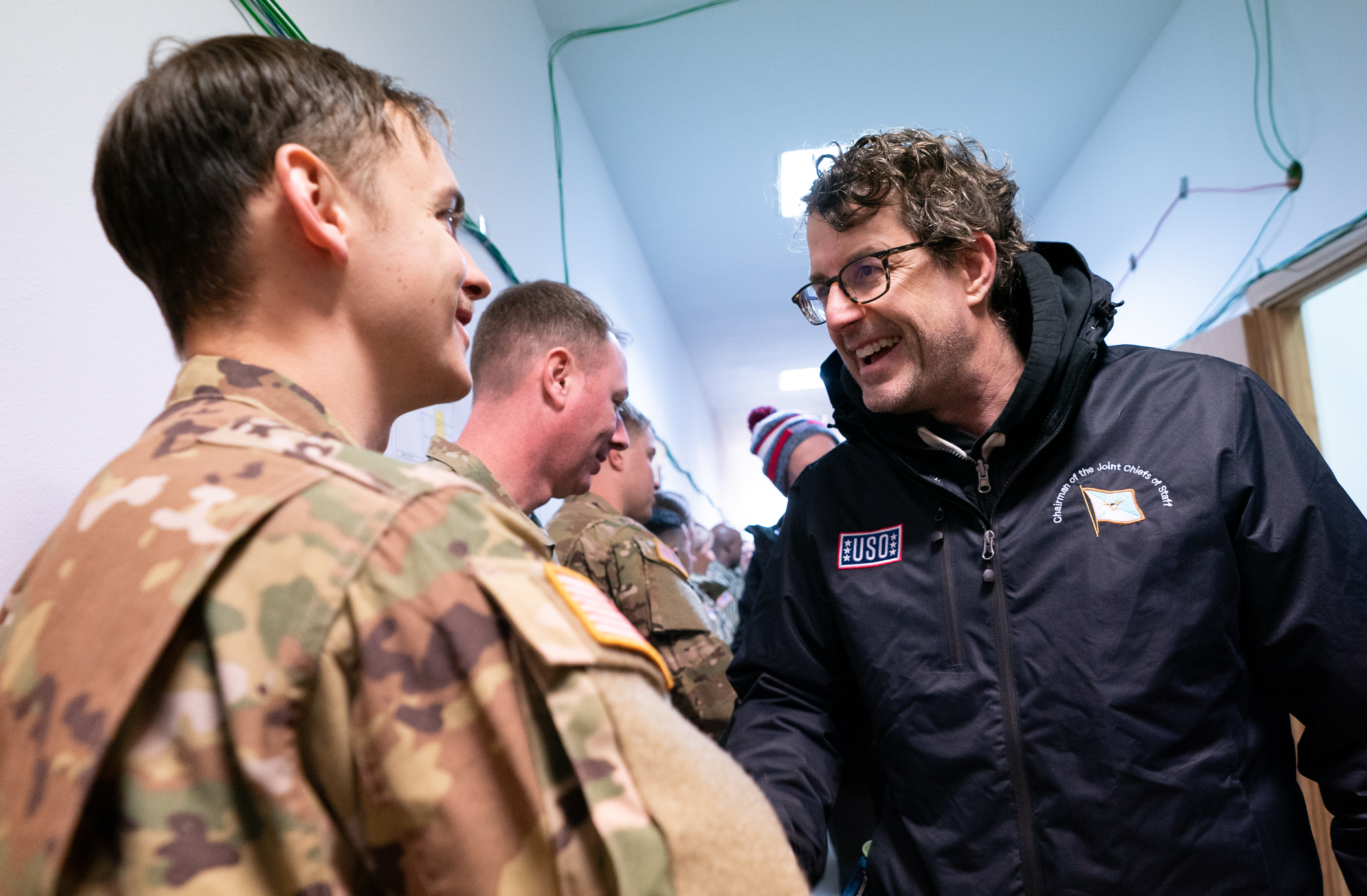
Armstrong at a USO performance for US troops in Romania in 2020

Armstrong started out working at an advertising agency in Chicago in his early 20s. While working there, he took night classes at The Second City and ImprovOlympic where he studied under Del Close. He also performed (and continues to perform) with the Upright Citizens Brigade in groups/shows including Mother, Feature Feature, Asscatt, and Soundtrack. During this time, he met Todd Phillips whom he hired to direct a commercial for Miller Genuine Draft. In 2000, the two released their first feature film together, Road Trip, which Armstrong co-wrote and Phillips directed.

Armstrong and Phillips would end up working on a variety of other films together including Old School (2003), Starsky & Hutch (2004), School for Scoundrels (2006), and The Hangover Part II (2011). Outside of his partnership with Phillips, Armstrong was also responsible for uncredited rewrites of Elf and Bad Santa. In 2007, he co-wrote the Farrelly Brothers' film, The Heartbreak Kid. The following year, Semi-Pro, which was Armstrong's first solo-written film, was released.

In 2011, Armstrong announced the concept for his directorial debut, Road to Nardo. The film was set to begin production in 2011. Its name was changed to Search Party and the distribution rights were picked up by Universal in 2013. The film was eventually released in 2015 and was released in May 2016 in the United States. Armstrong's production company, American Work Inc., has also produced several films and TV shows including Hesher, NBC's Best Friends Forever, a TV series adaptation of Problem Child, and the USA Network's Playing House (among others).

In 2015, Showtime gave Armstrong's show, Dice, a straight-to-series order of six episodes. The series—which Armstrong writes, directs, and produces—follows the exploits of a fictional version of Andrew Dice Clay and premiered on Showtime in 2016.

Armstrong also co-hosts the UCB Sports & Leisure Podcast, alongside Matt Walsh.

== Filmography ==
Film

Year	Title	Director	Producer	Writer
2000	Road Trip			Yes
2003	Old School			Yes
2004	Starsky & Hutch			Yes
2006	School for Scoundrels			Yes
2007	The Heartbreak Kid			Yes
2008	Semi-Pro			Yes
2011	The Hangover Part II			Yes
2014	Search Party	Yes	Yes	Yes

Executive producer

- Hesher (2010)

Uncredited rewrite

- Elf (2003)
- Bad Santa (2003)

Television

Year	Title	Director	Executive Producer	Writer	Notes
2012	Best Friends Forever		Yes		
2012	Animal Practice		Yes		
2014–2017	Playing House		Yes		
2015	Problem Child		Yes	Yes	
2016–2017	Dice	Yes	Yes	Yes	Creator
