= Kate Spencer =

Kate Spencer may refer to:

- Kate Spencer (author), American author, comedian, and podcast host
- Katie Spencer (curler) (born 1991), Canadian curler
- Manhunter (Kate Spencer), a DC Comics character
