= Bless This Mess (TV series) =

American sitcom television series

- Genre: Sitcom
- Created by: Lake Bell; Elizabeth Meriwether
- Starring: Dax Shepard; Lake Bell; JT Neal; Pam Grier; Ed Begley Jr.; David Koechner; Lennon Parham; Langston Kerman
- Composer: Ben Decter
- Country of origin: United States
- Original language: English
- No. of seasons: 2
- No. of episodes: 26

Production
- Executive producers: Dax Shepard; Erin O'Malley; Jake Kasdan; Melvin Mar; Katherine Pope; Elizabeth Meriwether; Lake Bell
- Cinematography: Blake McClure; Jason Oldak; Kevin Atkinson
- Editors: Ruthie Aslan; Tony Orcena; Al LeVine; Jamie Kennedy; Arge O'Neal; Elizabeth Praino; Nicholas Wenger; Gina Sansom
- Camera setup: Single-camera
- Running time: 22 minutes
- Production companies: Elizabeth Meriwether Pictures; Lake Bell Prod.; ABC Studios; 20th Century Fox Television

Original release
- Network: ABC
- Release: April 16, 2019 – May 5, 2020

Bless This Mess is an American single-camera sitcom created by Lake Bell and Elizabeth Meriwether that aired from April 16, 2019, to May 5, 2020, on ABC. It stars Dax Shepard, Bell, JT Neal, Pam Grier, and Ed Begley Jr. In May 2019, ABC renewed the series for a second season, which premiered on September 24, 2019. In May 2020, the series was canceled after two seasons.

== Premise ==
Young couple Mike and Rio leave their home in New York and move to a farm in the fictional town of Bucksnort, Nebraska, that Mike inherited from his great-aunt. They find it badly neglected and occupied by a senile old man named Rudy Longfellow. Deciding to stay, they restore and try to run the farm and find themselves adapting to the strange, tightly knit community of colorful eccentrics with mixed results.

== Cast ==
=== Main ===
- Dax Shepard as Michael "Mike" Levine-Young, a former music journalist from New York. He is married to Rio.
- Lake Bell as Rio Levine-Young, a former therapist and Mike's wife
- JT Neal as Jacob Bowman, Mike and Rio's neighbors' son
- Pam Grier as Constance Terry, the owner of the store, "Connie's", and the local sheriff
- Ed Begley Jr. as Rudy Longfellow, who lives in the Levine-Youngs' barn
- David Koechner as Beau Bowman (season 2, recurring season 1), a local rancher who tries to buy the Levine-Youngs' farm but later befriends them. He is Kay's husband and Jacob's father.
- Lennon Parham as Kay Bowman (season 2, recurring season 1), neighbor of Rio and Mike. She is Jacob's mother and Beau's wife.
- Langston Kerman as Brandon Terry (season 2), Constance's son

=== Recurring ===
- Susie Essman as Donna Levine, Rio's mother
- Jim O'Heir as Kent, the town veterinarian
- Nancy Lenehan as Deb, Kent's wife and a postal carrier
- Lisa Linke as Clara, Rio's socially awkward friend
- Belle Adams as Janine, Jacob's intensely rebellious girlfriend
- Geoffrey Owens as Pastor Paul

=== Guest ===
- Marla Gibbs as Belle, Constance's elderly and demanding mother
- Jessica St. Clair as Stacey Grisham, Kay's sister
- Edward James Olmos as Randy, Theresa's new husband
- Rita Moreno as Theresa, Rudy's ex-wife
- Nicole Richie as Sierra, Rio's wealthy socialite friend from New York
- Martin Mull as Martin Young, Mike's father
- Christine Estabrook as Maryanne Young, Mike's mother
- Ryan Hansen as Matt Young, Mike's brother

== Episodes ==
=== Series overview ===
Season	Episodes	Originally released	
Season	Episodes	First released	Last released
1	6	April 16, 2019	May 21, 2019
2	20	September 24, 2019	May 5, 2020

=== Season 1 (2019) ===
No. overall	No. in season	Title	Directed by	Written by	Original release date	Prod. code	U.S. viewers (millions)
1	1	"Pilot"	Lake Bell	Lake Bell & Elizabeth Meriwether	April 16, 2019	1LBB01	4.72
Mike and Rio leave New York when he inherits his great-aunt's farm, but it is not what they expected. Their neighbors, the Bowmans, offer to buy the farm, claiming it is no longer productive, but Mike refuses. Rio tries to help Rudy, a widower, cope with his feelings for Constance, the local hardware store owner. With a storm approaching, Rio becomes discouraged by Mike's lack of progress on renovating the ruined farmhouse, tries to convince him to accept the Bowmans' offer, and they have their first fight. Constance, who is also the town sheriff, confronts Mike and tells him to be honest with Rio. Caught in the storm, Mike admits that he left New York not by choice, but because he was laid off, and that he feels guilty for lying to Rio. She forgives him, and Constance rescues them the next morning, while also bringing neighbors to fix up their house. Mistaking a weed for an alfalfa plant, the couple's faith in their farm is restored.
2	2	"The Chicken and the Goat"	Kevin Bray	Justin Nowell	April 23, 2019	1LBB02	3.58
Mike's single-minded focus on restoring the farm's soil puts a crimp in his relationship with Rio, so they decide to have a date night. A supportive Constance makes Kay invite the couple to her potluck and helps Rio make an icebox cake. Beau smugly informs Mike that it won't rain for weeks, ruining his plan to seed the fields with clover. Upset, he refuses to go to the potluck, and when Rio goes, Kay throws out her cake and lets her embarrass herself. Rudy shames Mike for failing to support his wife, and he helps her stand up to the Bowmans' bullying. They then go to have sex in the barn, only to upset the cattle inside and trigger them to start mating. Constance makes both sides apologize and the Bowmans demand compensation for losing their bull's valuable sperm. Mike is forced to give them his tractor, so to keep the farm running, Rio obtains a flock of chickens so they can fertilize their crops naturally.
3	3	"The Return of Short Shorts"	Robert Cohen	Alyssa Lane & Alex Sherman	April 30, 2019	1LBB03	3.15
Rio learns that Rudy has been buying a single piece of licorice every day in Constance's store for a year. Beau taunts Mike with his childhood nickname of "Short Shorts"; to prove his worth as a farmer, Mike agrees to slaughter all of his chickens personally. Rio tries to teach Constance how to flirt, but she ends up scaring Rudy off. Kay becomes upset when Jacob asks for a professional haircut. Mike lies about killing the chickens and Beau calls him out, demanding that Mike sell him some chicken meat. The couple hide their chickens, but the lie is exposed when the birds escape and Beau realizes that the meat is store-bought. Rio steals Rudy's licorice to force him to go back, so Constance arrests her and explains that she needs to let people befriend her in their own time. Jacob agrees to let Kay keep cutting his hair. Mike decides not to let Beau take his chickens for slaughtering and instead buys his entire stock so he and Rio can raise them for eggs.
4	4	"Predators"	Anya Adams	Craig Rowin	May 7, 2019	1LBB04	3.16
A predator kills one of the chickens. When Mike decides to hunt it, Rio is dismayed that he refuses to let her help, insisting that she needs him to "protect" her. Constance asks Rudy out on a date, but he refuses due to his discomfort with a woman asking him out. The Bowmans offer to help find the culprit by reviewing their security camera footage, which reveals video of Beau crying. Rio gets Rudy to help her hunt for the predator, only to be abandoned when he leaves to apologize to Constance for his stupidity. The predator, a weasel, gets into the house, causing Rio to succumb to her fear; she begs Mike to rescue her, but he can't as he has to drive Jacob to the hospital after he cuts off his own thumb. Beau has an emotional breakdown and Mike tells him that he shouldn't be ashamed of crying in front of his son. When Mike comes home, he discovers that Rio managed to capture the weasel herself, and the two reaffirm their commitment to each other.
5	5	"In Hot Water"	Molly McGlynn	Chelsea Devantez	May 14, 2019	1LBB05	2.66
Rio's overprotective mother Donna continues to intrude on her and Mike's life, first by trying to pay for a new water heater when theirs breaks, and then by sending a straw buyer to purchase all of Mike's eggs at the farmer's market. Rio decides that she wants to restart her career as a therapist, and accepts Constance's invitation to join the neighborhood scrapbooking circle in order to find potential clients. Kay, jealous of Rio's ability to make friends easily, sends her on a fake errand that ends with her biking straight into a manure pond. A fed-up Rio drags herself home while forcing Mike and Donna to make peace with each other. After reminiscing about her late husband Morris with Beau, Constance takes Rudy up on his offer to escort her to the county fair in two weeks. Kay agrees to have private "scrapbooking" sessions with Rio, and pays for the first one by fixing the water heater.
6	6	"The Estonian Method"	Josh Greenbaum	Dominic Dierkes	May 21, 2019	1LBB06	2.81
Tensions between the Bowmans and the Levine-Youngs erupt at the county fair when Beau, angered by Rio urging his wife to share her feelings, uses his position as a judge to disqualify their prize hen, Priyanka, from competing. Fueled by rage, Mike and Rio go head to head with Beau and Kay at the wife-carry race, but end up running into them and getting everyone ejected from the contest. Rudy runs into his ex-wife Theresa, who clearly wants to win him back, but he refuses her advances until she talks him into square-dancing with her, which drives a wedge between him and Constance; they mutually agree to take their relationship more slowly from now on. The Bowmans' barn catches fire, and Mike and Rio manage to put it out themselves while saving Jacob's cows. Kay forces Beau to give them back their tractor in return. Sometime later, Beau arrives at Mike's farm after she kicks him out, and announces that he'll be staying with them until they help him fix his marriage.

=== Season 2 (2019–20) ===
No. overall	No. in season	Title	Directed by	Written by	Original release date	Prod. code	U.S viewers (millions)
7	1	"459"	Lake Bell	Dominic Dierkes	September 24, 2019	2LBB01	3.99
With Cornhuskers football season starting, Mike and Rio are chosen by raffle to host the town's annual kick-off party, which includes a greased-pig chase. Eager to prove that they can respect local traditions, Mike and Rio take Constance up on her offer to help them plan the event. However, Rio decides that she's not comfortable with the pig chase, and declares to everyone that, like it or not, they won't be doing that this year or any future years. The locals are upset, but eventually come around, and Mike volunteers to be the "pig" instead for next season. Beau and Kay try to hide the truth of their failing marriage, but when the secret comes out, they confess and decide to work harder at fixing their relationship. Rudy asks for relationship advice from Jacob, who is dating a girl named Janine, and finally asks Constance for permission to kiss her, which she grants.
8	2	"Phase Two"	Ken Whittingham	Rob Rosell	October 1, 2019	2LBB02	3.80
Beau tells Mike and Rio that, by not having had sex in more than three weeks, they have officially entered the "second phase" of their marriage, which he fears will eventually drive them apart like it did with his wife. In response, Mike and Rio attempt to spice up their sex life only be repeatedly interrupted by various problems with the house as well as their own sexual dissatisfaction with each other. Constance's son Brandon returns from overseas deployment, and discovers his mother's relationship with Rudy; he accepts it, but Constance realizes that she's not ready to involve Rudy in her son's life and asks that they remain simply boyfriend and girlfriend. Mike accidentally stumbles across a snake nest, and Beau removes it while also bringing in Kay to fix several leaky pipes, which gives them the opportunity to discuss their feelings. Based on this, Beau creates three new rules for sustaining a good marriage, which he passes on to Mike and Rio.
9	3	"Omaha"	Claire Scanlon	Chelsea Devantez	October 8, 2019	2LBB03	3.85
Kay and Constance lead the women of the town, including Rio, to Omaha for their annual gynecological checkups. Left to his own devices, Mike gets tired of hearing Rudy and Beau squabble and agrees to help them cut down a dead branch, only for all three to wind up stuck in the tree itself. Kay becomes despondent upon realizing that everyone but her has had multiple sexual partners, and asks Rio to be her wing-woman while she tries to pick up men at a cocktail mixer. Brandon, serving as acting sheriff, arrives to help Mike and the others, but chickens out and admits he's scared of heights; the other men encourage him by admitting their own fears and inspire him to use his engineering expertise to fashion a makeshift elevator to get them out. Kay's confidence is shaken when she hooks up with the wrong man, and Rio offers to help her improve her flirting skills in return for driving lessons, which she has neglected to take.
10	4	"Bang for Your Buck"	Molly McGlynn	Alyssa Lane & Alex Sherman	October 15, 2019	2LBB04	3.42
Rio is selected to play the wife of the town's founder for the Founder's Day reenactment. Mike is appointed as editor of the local paper, The Bucksnort Bugle, and immediately inserts himself into a historic feud between Rudy and the Wyatt family, who both claim that their ancestors founded Bucksnort. Against Rio's advice, Mike decides to publish an article supporting Rudy's claim, resulting in her role being recast while she is given a lesser part. Jacob asks his parents to give him "the sex talk", which turns into a disaster when neither proves willing to actually discuss such an uncomfortable topic. An attempt by Mike to meditate between the two sides fails, and he contemplates quitting the paper before Rio persuades him to keep digging. The Bowmans finally tell their son that he can talk to them whenever he's ready. Mike finds evidence that Bucksnort's founders were in a polygamous marriage, meaning both Rudy and the Wyatts are related.
11	5	"Scare Night"	Dean Holland	Justin Nowell	October 29, 2019	2LBB05	3.85
Mike's annual Halloween tradition, "Scare Night", has always made Rio uncomfortable, but she fears breaking Mike's heart too much to tell him to stop. In an attempt to win over Kay, Beau dresses up as Jamie from Outlander only to find that she is unwilling to admit her feelings for him. Rio comes up with a plan to strike back at her husband by turning his greatest fears into a home movie and forcing him to watch it, but the prank goes horribly wrong when a bat flies into the house and bites Mike, giving him rabies. Jacob joins Janine and her friends to throw toilet paper at Rudy's barn, which he refuses to take part in until Rudy tells him it's fine, as he reuses the paper all year round. At Constance's Halloween party, Kay acknowledges how attractive Beau is in his costume. While receiving emergency rabies shots from Kent, Mike finally hears the truth from Rio, and decides that Scare Night isn't more important to him than his marriage.
12	6	"The Visit"	Ken Whittingham	Craig Rowin	November 12, 2019	2LBB06	3.51
Donna shows up out of the blue, insisting on helping Mike and Rio by "persuading" Beau to let them harvest a portion of his crops in order to prove to the county that they are serious farmers. However, it quickly becomes clear to Rio that her mother is actually trying to convince her that farm life is too hard so she'll move back to the city. After an argument, Donna storms off and winds up assisting Mike with birthing a litter of piglets. Constance asks Rudy to work with Brandon for the day, but their personalities clash. Rudy admits that as a veteran himself, he knows that Constance needs to let her son relax and not work so much as he adjusts to civilian life. Rio overhears Donna and Mike talking about her, and Donna reveals that while she may not necessarily approve of her daughter's lifestyle choices, she is willing to let her make them so she can be happy. The two part on amicable terms and Donna returns home.
13	7	"Six Out of Six"	Molly McGlynn	Nathan Chetty	November 19, 2019	2LBB07	3.43
With their pig Portia unable to nurse her piglets, Mike and Rio are forced to take care of them themselves. The locals hold a Euchre tournament, and both Beau and Kay bring their own "dates" as partners. While visiting Constance's store to buy formula, Mike and Rio are asked why they don't have kids of their own, and Mike decides that they should try to conceive despite Rio's concerns that having a baby would ruin their relationship. When Mike accidentally locks the piglets in his car, however, and Rio has to fetch Beau and Kay to help, she learns from them that even though having Jacob destroyed everything good in their marriage, in time he became the reason for them to keep trying. Rio tells Mike that she is ready to start a family. After the other players in the tournament are eliminated, Beau and Kay ditch their dates and team up against Constance and Rudy. Through teamwork, they are able to win.
14	8	"The Grisham Gals"	Ken Whittingham	Ashley Nicole Black	November 26, 2019	2LBB08	3.58
Kay's sister Stacy (Jessica St. Clair), a professional rodeo rider, visits; Rio tries to befriend her until she discovers that Mike and Stacy had a relationship and nearly got married before he met and married her. Egged on by Kay, who has always been jealous of her sister's accomplishments and seemingly perfect life, Rio gets a cowgirl makeover and upstages a party that the two are attending before Stacy reveals that she has no intention of stealing Mike. Rudy spends the night at Constance's house, but fails to pick up on any of her sexual advances. Taking advice from Theresa, he decides to start being more direct. Constance, however, admits that she enjoys doing foreplay with him. Stacy tells Kay that while she may be more successful, she has yet to achieve what Kay has: a loving husband and a son. At Rio's urging, the sisters make amends.
15	9	"Goose Glazing Time"	Molly McGlynn	Chelsea Devantez	December 10, 2019	2LBB09	3.62
Despite Rio and Mike's plans to have a quiet dinner by themselves for Christmas, they find themselves forced to play host when Constance's unpleasant mother Belle shows up unexpectedly and Rudy has to lie about being a wealthy self-made man to keep her from breaking up their relationship. Beau joins Kay and Jacob for Christmas and does everything he can to help his wife, claiming that he wants to make up for all the irresponsible things he did while they were together. When Jacob comes in from riding his new ATV, he catches his parents having sex and runs off to hide in Rio and Mike's barn. Unable to escape the drama, Mike and Rio divide and conquer: Mike goes to see Constance and convinces her to stand up to Belle for Rudy while Rio gets Kay and Beau to make amends with their son. Afterwards, they finally sit down to dinner but realize they don't want to be alone. So instead, they invite everyone over for a family dinner.
16	10	"Bad Seed"	Lennon Parham	Morgan Lehmann	January 21, 2020	2LBB10	3.26
Mike's friend Ray gives him one day to decide what kinds of seeds he wants to order for planting season. With her therapy practice struggling, Rio takes the Bowmans on as clients; Kay is furious that Beau won't commit to going on a cruise that she's been wanting to take for years, to which Beau admits he is frightened of doing so. Rio agrees to do solo therapy to help him overcome these fears. Constance becomes suspicious of Rudy, believing he has something to hide. With help from Jacob (who's shadowing her for school), she interrogates him and learns the real reason he lives in Mike's barn: he burned his own farm down as part of an insurance fraud scheme. Shocked, she tells Rudy to leave while she reconsiders their relationship. Beau leaves to go on the cruise himself, and Kay tracks him down after realizing that she also needs to see if their love is still strong. Mike chooses to order sorghum seeds from Ray after talking with his wife.
17	11	"The Letter of the Law"	Molly McGlynn	Justin Nowell	January 28, 2020	2LBB11	3.39
Rio's best friend Sierra (Nicole Richie) invites her to her wedding in Iceland, but due to a lack of money, she declines the invitation. Rudy asks Mike and Jacob for advice on how to deal with Constance. Mike advises him to wait, but Rudy becomes impatient and switches to Jacob's irresponsible suggestion of making a big romantic gesture, which only annoys Constance even more. Rio complains that Deb is breaking the law by reading her mail, so Deb quits in protest and Rio is ordered to take over her mail route for the day. The experience teaches Rio why Deb reads people's mail: the townsfolk frequently need her to help with their problems, which she can only do if she knows their business. Constance finally tells Rudy that they aren't right for each other, and they mutually agree to separate. Mike offers to pay for Rio to go to Iceland, but Sierra informs them that she has decided to hold her wedding at their farm instead.
18	12	"Bunker Down"	Dean Holland	Sarah Mickelson	February 11, 2020	2LBB12	3.42
While planning for the wedding, Mike discovers that both Rudy and Constance are not handling their breakup well, so he persuades Brandon to help him get them to start talking again. Egged on by Sierra, Rio agrees to host a rave in her barn, but it quickly gets out of control when Sierra puts the event on Instagram. Rudy, upon learning that Constance wants to speak to him, withdraws into his underground bunker and refuses to leave. The ravers discover the bunker by accident and crowd in; Sierra angrily rebuffs Rio when she tries to mend their friendship after learning that her friend's disapproving family won't be at the wedding. Constance breaks up the rave and arrests Rudy, Mike, Rio, and Sierra. While taking his mugshot, she gives Rudy a police scanner so he can hear her voice when he wants. Mike gets Sierra and Rio to patch things up, pointing out that while they are very different people now, that doesn't mean their friendship isn't any less strong.
19	13	"Calm Down"	Molly McGlynn	Alyssa Lane & Alex Sherman	February 18, 2020	2LBB13	3.35
As Sierra's wedding day approaches, Rio becomes overwhelmed with all her responsibilities and winds up throwing out her back. Mike meets with the locals, who are furious about how the wedding guests have no respect for the town; when he tries to calm them, they become enraged and threaten to sabotage the wedding. Rio intervenes and gets them to stand down, but then a new problem arises: Sierra admits she doesn't love her fiancée. She intends to go through with the marriage anyhow, but when Mike and Rio demonstrate how much they love each other despite their various faults, she realizes she can't do it. To spare her friend certain humiliation, Rio has Mike and the locals dump manure all around the farm, creating such a powerful stench that all of the guests leave while Sierra runs off with Brandon. Rio is upset that the wedding didn't work out, but then Kay, who has just returned home, surprises everyone by renewing her vows with Beau.
20	14	"Völsung and the Beef Boy"	Ken Whittingham	Craig Rowin	February 25, 2020	2LBB14	3.14
Jacob is preparing for Bucksnort's annual meat-judging contest, but secretly confides to Mike that he hates doing it. He laments that he has no passion for anything, so when Mike mentions he used to have a band, Völsung, in high school, the two bond over their shared love of rock music. Kay insists on teaching Rio to drive, but Rio finds that Kay is too short-tempered to be a good instructor. She tries to take lessons from Connie in secret, but Kay finds out. However, she realizes she's more sorry than angry at Rio, and cleverly fakes a heart attack to give her friend the motivation to actually drive. Jacob asks Mike to help him stage a surprise concert at the contest, but when the time comes, he chokes and bails on Mike to win the contest instead. Mike isn't upset, telling Jacob that he already knows what his passion is and doesn't need his help to find it. Rio convinces Mike to achieve his long-held dream of performing a full show as Völsung.
21	15	"Pastor Paul"	Anya Adams	Rob Rosell	March 17, 2020	2LBB15	4.06
A new reverend, Pastor Paul, is hired to serve as the town priest; Rio's therapy practice quickly declines as all of her clients decide they'd rather go to Paul for free advice. Mike decides that as a farmer, he needs to buy a truck. He finds a good one, but when he asks Kay and Brandon to help fix it up, they refuse to do so until he gets Rio's consent first. Rio tries to expose Paul as a quack, but her efforts fail and she argues with Mike when she catches him waiting for counseling. Their argument, which contains plenty of personal details, is overheard by the parishioners. Believing that Rio must be a good therapist to willingly share such private information in public, they ask her for appointments. Paul himself visits Rio, confessing that he and Connie have been having sex on numerous occasions as she tries to get over her feelings for Rudy. Mike gets the truck rebuilt, and shows it off to the entire town before taking his wife for a drive.
22	16	"Knuckles"	Molly McGlynn	Nathan Chetty	March 24, 2020	2LBB16	4.02
Rio unintentionally insults Mike by pointing out that he always leaves things unfinished, so when they go on a camping trip with Kay and Beau, Mike becomes unreasonably obsessed with catching a fish and refuses to leave his spot until he does so. Kay and Beau observe this, and decide to stop criticizing each other so they'll never be unhappy again. Brandon, hoping to drive Pastor Paul away from his mother so she and Rudy can get back together, tells him to make their relationship more public, which Constance dislikes. When she learns the truth, she tells her son that he needs to start dating so he'll stop messing with her love life. Kay and Beau finally argue, but find it unpleasant and instead decide to have sex in their tent. Mike discovers Rio putting an already-caught fish on his hook and tells her that she was right and he never finishes anything. Rio replies that she knows Mike will always finish something when it truly matters.
23	17	"After-Prom"	Erin O'Malley	Morgan Lehmann	April 7, 2020	2LBB17	3.82
Mike and Rio assist the Bowmans with running Bucksnort's after-prom, where Kay makes it her mission to end Jacob's relationship with Janine, who she disapproves of. Beau is saddened to learn that Jacob has been accepted to Nebraska State and Mike gets the both of them drunk in an attempt to get his friend to open up. Rudy and Brandon have to compete with each other for a night clerk job. Kay ignores Rio's advice and demands her son dump Janine; Jacob responds by asking her to marry him and announcing he won't attend college. Mike and Beau get in a fight, where they finally connect and Beau admits he fears being alone without Jacob in his life. Kay gives in and tells Jacob he can make his own decisions, and Jacob and Janine decide not to get married until they're ready. Brandon wins the contest, but lets Rudy have the job instead when Constance buys him an old RV so he can move out of her house.
24	18	"The Table"	Bill Purple	Dominic Dierkes	April 14, 2020	2LBB18	3.48
Mike receives a surprise visit from his family on his birthday, which gives him the chance to get their blessing for his plan to modernize the farm. Although they approve, he admits to Rio that he feels immense pressure to execute his plans perfectly or risk letting his folks down. Rudy then reveals that he and Mike's mother had an affair many years ago, and Mike learns that not only did his father and brother know, they chose not to tell him. Disgusted, he runs off and demands to be left alone. Rio speaks to her in-laws and tells them to start being honest with her husband and themselves; when Mike returns, he forgives his mother and explains that he no longer feels any pressure to be perfect since he knows his family is just as flawed as any other. Brandon has trouble finding a date, so his mother and Clara intervene by using deception to lure girls into meeting him. As it turns out, none of them find such behavior endearing and reject him.
25	19	"Tornado Season: Part One"	Lennon Parham	Rob Ulin & Camille Patrao	April 28, 2020	2LBB19	3.93
Dolores, a prominent restaurateur from Omaha, arrives in Bucksnort to open a new franchise, giving Mike the idea to sell her his farm's eggs. Beau learns that he's nearly broke and decides to steal his friend's idea rather than admit his failings. While planning Jacob's engagement party with Kay, Rio discovers that Janine might be pregnant. Kay is enraged, but then starts showing symptoms of pregnancy as well, forcing Rio to procure pregnancy tests from Constance. Dolores runs into Rudy and finds him attractive; they get intimate but agree to keep it secret at her insistence. Mike and Beau sabotage each other's farms, but Dolores ultimately chooses Mike's offer due to the quality of his eggs. Beau, after telling Kay the truth, goes over to apologize just as a tornado siren sounds. In the resulting chaos as everyone runs for shelter, Rio places all of the pregnancy tests (including one she took herself) in different pockets of her jumpsuit.
26	20	"Tornado Season: Part Two"	Molly McGlynn	Barbie Adler	May 5, 2020	2LBB20	3.82
As the tornado hits town, Mike and Beau hide in Rudy's bunker with Dolores; Rudy and Constance are forced to lock themselves in Clara's barn; and Rio joins Janine, Jacob, and Kay in the Bowman family shelter. Rio then misplaces the pregnancy tests, meaning that out of the three women, only one of them is actually pregnant. Kay loses her temper and snaps at Jacob and Janine for being irresponsible, before apologizing and accepting Janine into her family. Rudy talks with Constance, admitting he still loves her and how uncomfortable he feels with the way Dolores treats him. When the tornado finally passes, he confronts Dolores and breaks up with her. Mike, after learning that several local farms were badly damaged by the tornado, announces that he is forming a farmers' co-op to sell produce to Dolores' restaurants to raise relief funds. He also picks Beau to help him run the co-op so he can fix his financial situation. Kay discovers through a second round of pregnancy tests that neither she or Janine are pregnant; Rio is. The town celebrates Rio's pregnancy and the Bowmans provide Mike and Rio with unused baby care essentials.

== Production ==
=== Development ===
On October 10, 2017, it was announced that Fox had given Bless This Mess for the put pilot commitment. Fox officially ordered the series to pilot in February 2018. The pilot was written by Lake Bell and Elizabeth Meriwether, who executive produced alongside Erin O'Malley, Jake Kasdan, Melvin Mar and Katherine Pope. Production companies involved with the pilot included Elizabeth Meriwether Pictures, Lake Bell Prod. and 20th Century Fox Television. After the pilot was completed, Fox declined to pick up the project; however, ABC ordered it to series on December 11, 2018. A day after that, it was announced that the series would premiere in the mid-season of 2019 and air on Tuesdays at 9:30 P.M. The series debuted on April 16, 2019.

On May 10, 2019, ABC renewed the series for a second season and premiered on September 24, 2019. On November 7, 2019, the series for a second season received a back order of six episodes. On May 21, 2020, ABC canceled the series after two seasons.

=== Casting ===
In March 2018, it was announced that Dax Shepard and Ed Begley Jr. had been cast in the pilot's lead roles. Alongside the pilot's order announcement, in June 2018, it was reported that Pam Grier, JT Neal, and Christina Offley had joined the cast. On September 16, 2019, it was announced that David Koechner, Lennon Parham, and Langston Kerman are promoted to series regular, starting with the second season.

== Reception ==
=== Critical response ===
On review aggregator Rotten Tomatoes, the series holds an approval rating of 82% based on 11 reviews, with an average rating of 6/10. The website's critical consensus reads, "Well-written and endearingly down-home, Bless This Mess' greatest gift is the joy of seeing its hilarious and like-able ensemble all in one place." On Metacritic, it has a weighted average score of 60 out of 100, based on 10 critics, indicating "mixed or average reviews".

=== Ratings ===
Viewership and ratings per season of Bless This Mess
Season	Timeslot (ET)	Episodes	First aired		Last aired		TV season	Viewership rank	Avg. viewers (millions)	Avg. 18–49 rating
Season	Timeslot (ET)	Episodes	Date	Viewers (millions)	Date	Viewers (millions)	TV season	Viewership rank	Avg. viewers (millions)	Avg. 18–49 rating
1	Tuesday 9:30 p.m.	6	April 16, 2019	4.72	May 21, 2019	2.81	2018–19	89	4.78	1.0
2	Tuesday 8:30 p.m.	20	September 24, 2019	3.99	May 5, 2020	3.82	2019–20	75	4.72	0.9

==== Season 1 ====
Viewership and ratings per episode of Bless This Mess
No.	Title	Air date	Rating/share (18–49)	Viewers (millions)	DVR (18–49)	DVR viewers (millions)	Total (18–49)	Total viewers (millions)
1	"Pilot"	April 16, 2019	0.9/4	4.72	0.5	2.55	1.4	7.27
2	"The Chicken and the Goat"	April 23, 2019	0.7/3	3.58	0.4	2.17	1.1	5.75
3	"The Return of Short Shorts"	April 30, 2019	0.6/3	3.15	0.5	2.07	1.1	5.22
4	"Predators"	May 7, 2019	0.6/3	3.16	0.3	1.62	0.9	4.61
5	"In Hot Water"	May 14, 2019	0.6/3	2.66	0.3	1.73	0.9	4.39
6	"The Estonian Method"	May 21, 2019	0.6/3	2.81	0.4	1.68	1.0	4.52

==== Season 2 ====
Viewership and ratings per episode of Bless This Mess
No.	Title	Air date	Rating/share (18–49)	Viewers (millions)	DVR (18–49)	DVR viewers (millions)	Total (18–49)	Total viewers (millions)
1	"459"	September 24, 2019	0.8/4	3.99	0.4	1.50	1.2	5.48
2	"Phase Two"	October 1, 2019	0.7/4	3.80	0.3	1.20	1.0	5.00
3	"Omaha"	October 8, 2019	0.8/4	3.85	0.2	1.12	1.0	4.97
4	"Bang for Your Buck"	October 15, 2019	0.7/4	3.42	0.3	1.08	1.0	4.50
5	"Scare Night"	October 29, 2019	0.8/4	3.85	0.3	1.04	1.1	4.89
6	"The Visit"	November 12, 2019	0.6/3	3.51	0.3	1.21	0.9	4.73
7	"Six Out of Six"	November 19, 2019	0.6/4	3.43	0.3	1.15	0.9	4.58
8	"The Grisham Gals"	November 26, 2019	0.7/4	3.58	0.3	1.12	1.0	4.71
9	"Goose Glazing Time"	December 10, 2019	0.6/3	3.62	—N/a	0.96	—N/a	4.58
10	"Bad Seed"	January 21, 2020	0.6/3	3.26	0.3	1.13	0.9	4.40
11	"The Letter of the Law"	January 28, 2020	0.6/3	3.39	0.3	1.15	0.9	4.54
12	"Bunker Down"	February 11, 2020	0.7	3.42	0.2	0.94	0.9	4.36
13	"Calm Down"	February 18, 2020	0.6	3.35	0.3	1.10	0.9	4.45
14	"Völsung and the Beef Boy"	February 25, 2020	0.6	3.14	0.3	1.05	0.9	4.19
15	"Pastor Paul"	March 17, 2020	0.7	4.06	0.3	1.07	1.0	5.14
16	"Knuckles"	March 24, 2020	0.7	4.02	0.3	1.08	1.0	5.03
17	"After-Prom"	April 7, 2020	0.7	3.82	0.2	0.97	0.9	4.74
18	"The Table"	April 14, 2020	0.6	3.48	0.2	1.08	0.8	4.56
19	"Tornado Season: Part One"	April 28, 2020	0.6	3.93	0.3	0.92	0.9	4.81
20	"Tornado Season: Part Two"	May 5, 2020	0.6	3.82	0.2	0.97	0.8	4.79

== See also ==
- Green Acres
