= Lennon Parham =

American actress (born 1975)

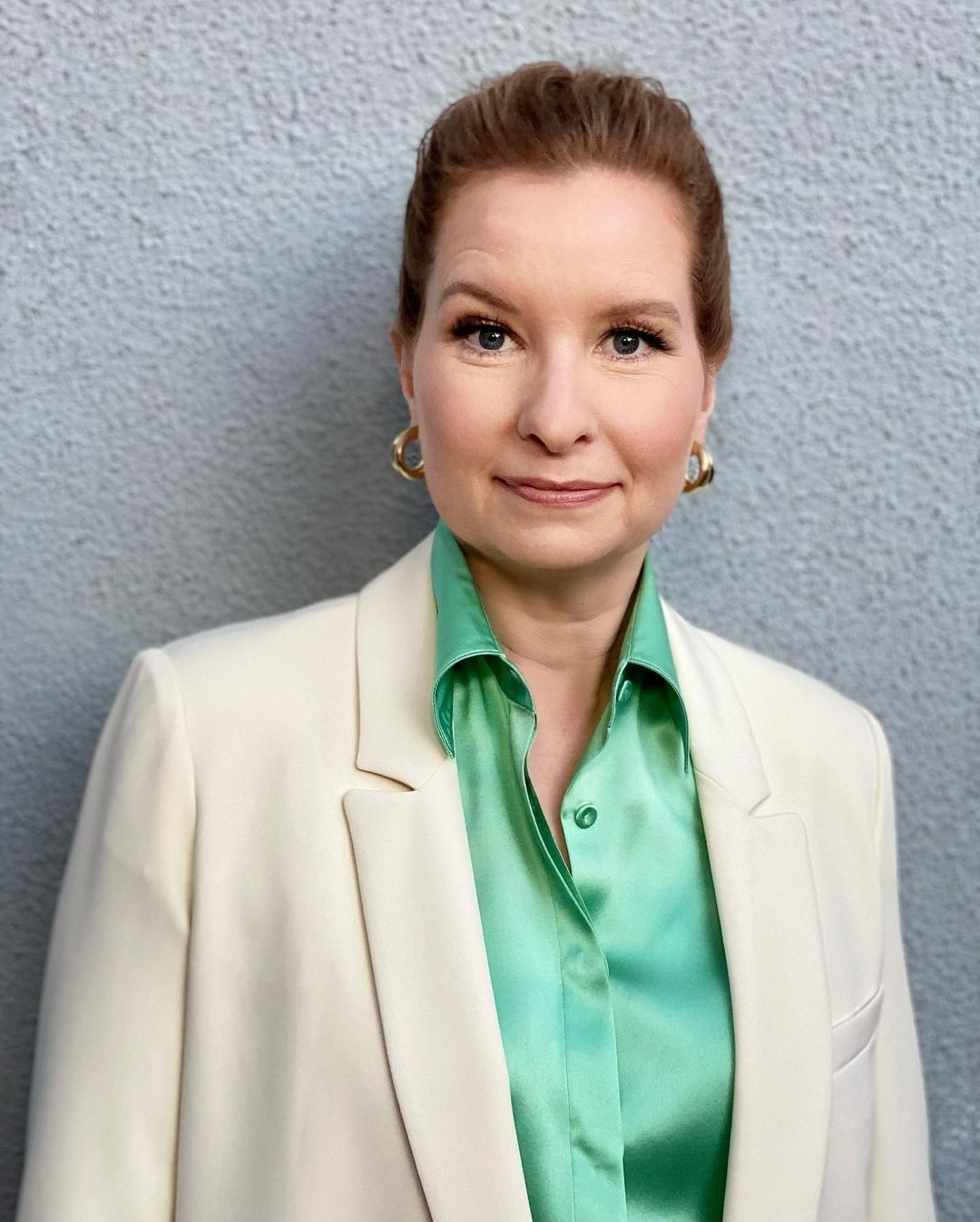
- Parham in 2022
- Born: October 26, 1975 (age 50)
- Education: University of Evansville (BFA)
- Occupations: Actress, comedian, director, writer
- Years active: 2001–present
- Spouse: Javier Guzman (m. 2006)
- Children: 2

Lennon Parham (born October 26, 1975) is an American actress, director and improvisational comedian from the Upright Citizens Brigade Theatre. With frequent collaborator Jessica St. Clair, she created and co-starred in NBC's Best Friends Forever and USA Network's Playing House. She also co-starred in the CBS sitcom Accidentally on Purpose from 2009 to 2010. More recently, she has appeared in the Max series Minx.

== Early life ==
Parham attended Parkview High School in Lilburn, Georgia, and graduated with a B.S. Degree in Theatre from the University of Evansville. Following college, she taught French for two years at T. L. Weston High School in Greenville, Mississippi, as part of the Teach For America program.

== Career ==
After her stint as a French teacher, Parham began performing comedy with the Upright Citizens Brigade Theatre. During this time, she starred in the two-person show The Adventures of Lock & Kay and the one-woman show She Tried to be Normal. In the fall of 2009, Parham began a supporting role in the comedy Accidentally on Purpose.

Parham and frequent collaborator Jessica St. Clair created and starred in the NBC comedy Best Friends Forever, which ran for one season in 2012. Their second sitcom, Playing House, premiered on USA on April 29, 2014, and lasted three seasons. In 2015, Parham and St. Clair spun-off their Comedy Bang! Bang! characters Wompler and Listler for a new Earwolf podcast called WOMP It Up!, with St. Clair as host Marissa Wompler and Parham co-hosting as Marissa's teacher Charlotte Listler. Frequent guests on the podcast include Brian Huskey as Marissa's stepdad "Seth" and Jason Mantzoukas as Marissa's former flame Eric "Gutterballs" Gutterman.

Parham has made appearances on television programs such as Veep, Parks and Recreation, Comedy Bang! Bang!, Bad Judge, Arrested Development, Lady Dynamite, Review, and Mad Men. In 2019 and 2020, she was a main cast member of the ABC sitcom Bless This Mess, starring Lake Bell and Dax Shepard. Her notable work in film includes Confessions of a Shopaholic, Splinterheads, and Horrible Bosses 2.

Parham was a guest on The Big Alakens Big Lake marathon fundraiser episode of The George Lucas Talk Show.

== Personal life ==
Parham is married to Javier Guzman. Their daughter Saraya was born on April 21, 2013. Their second child was born in October 2016.

== Filmography ==
Film
Year	Title	Role	Notes
2008	Pretty Bird	Woman at Gas Station	
2008	Transferants	The girl	Short film
2009	Strangers	Woman	
2009	Confessions of a Shopaholic	Joyce	
2009	Hysterical Psycho	Deaf Mute Sister	
2009	Splinterheads	Wyoming	
2011	Volcano Girl	Job Counselor	Short film
2014	Horrible Bosses 2	Roz	
2016	Other People	Vicki	
2017	The House	Martha	
2019	Bombshell	Beth's Employee	
2020	For Madmen Only: The Stories of Del Close	Arabella	
2025	Holland	Gwen	
2025	Swiped	Tour Guide	
2026	The Dink	Kris	

Television
Year	Title	Role	Notes
2007	UCB Comedy Originals	Herself	TV series
2009	Boldly Going Nowhere	Joyce	TV movie
2009	Parks and Recreation	Kate Speevack	Episode: "Canvassing"
2009	Attack Cardio		Video short
2009–2010	Accidentally on Purpose	Abby Chase	18 episodes
2010	Big Lake	Janet	Episode: "Chris Moves In"
2011	How I Met Your Mother	Bev	Episode: "Desperation Day"
2011	Funny or Die Presents	Jablonsky	4 episodes
2011	Childrens Hospital	Pharmacist	Episode: "Stryker Bites the Dust"
2012	Best Friends Forever	Lennon White	Lead role (6 episodes); also co-creator, writer, executive producer
2012	NTSF:SD:SUV::	Stephanie	Episode: "The NTSF: SD: SUV: HISS Infomercial"
2013	Mad Men	Ginny Hunt	Episode: "The Flood"
2013	Arrested Development	Therapist Sandy	Episode: "Off The Hook"
2014	In Bed with Joan	Herself	Episode: "Lennon Parham & Jessica St. Clair"
2014	The Birthday Boys	Doctor	Episode: "Women Are Funny"
2014	Bad Judge	Regina Bullock	Episode: "Face Mask Mom"
2014–2015	Comedy Bang! Bang!	Gabby / DJ Forsythia	2 episodes
2014–2017	Playing House	Maggie Caruso	Lead role (26 episodes); also co-creator, writer, director, executive producer
2015	Review	Mrs. Greenfield	2 episodes
2015	EastSiders	Carmella Fredrick	Episode: "Open Bar"
2015–2019	Veep	Karen Collins	7 episodes
2016	New Girl	Carol	Episode: "Bob & Carol & Nick & Schmidt"
2016	Documentary Now!	Ramona	Episode: "Parker Gail's Location Is Everything"
2016	Bajillion Dollar Propertie$	Carla Sutcliffe	Episode: "Amir vs Dean"
2016–2017	Animals	Ashley / Charly (voice)	2 episodes
2016–2017	Lady Dynamite	Larissa	12 episodes
2016–2017	Adventure Time	Dr. Gross (voice)	3 episodes
2017	Ghosted	Deidre	Episode: "Ghost Studz"
2017–2024	Bob's Burgers	Various voices	6 episodes
2018	Speechless	Sarah	Episode: "The H-u-s-Hustle"
2018	Little Big Awesome	Various voices	4 episodes
2018	Teachers	C.F. Blinky	Episode: "The Book Challenge"
2018	A Million Little Things	Gail	Episode: "The Game of Your Life"
2019	I'm Sorry	Beth	4 episodes
2019	American Dad!	Crony Girl (voice)	Episode: "Top of the Steve"
2019	Star vs. the Forces of Evil	Apothecarry Sherry (voice)	Episode: "Yada Yada Berries/Down by the River"
2019–2020	Schooled	Liz Flemming	12 episodes
2019–2020	Bless This Mess	Kay Bowman	26 episodes; also director
2020	Curb Your Enthusiasm	Randi	Episode: "Happy New Year"
2020	Robbie	Rooney Switt	Episode: "Robbie vs. Rooney"
2020	Close Enough	Toluca Lake (voice)	Episode: "Robot Tutor/Golden Gamer"
2020	The George Lucas Talk Show	Herself	Episode: "The Big Alakens Marathon"
2021	M.O.D.O.K.	Doris / Mrs. Horgan (voice)	2 episodes
2021	Star Trek: Lower Decks	Shari Yn Yem (voice)	Episode: "I, Excretus"
2021–2022	Tuca & Bertie	Various voices	2 episodes
2022	Big City Greens	Janice (voice)	Episode: "Papaganda"
2022	Better Things	Paige	2 episodes
2022	Little Demon	Darlene (voice)	8 episodes
2022–2025	The Great North	Marie (voice)	5 episodes
2022–2023	Minx	Shelly	Main cast
2023	History of the World, Part II	Greta	Episode: "VIII"
2023	Digman!	Lillian (voice)	Episode: "The Mile High Club"
2023	The Ghost and Molly McGee	Miss Fiamma (voice)	Episode: "Welcome to Necrocomic-con/Fit to Print"
2023–2024	Somebody Somewhere	—N/a	Director (5 episodes); writer (2 episodes)
2023–2024	Royal Crackers	Mel Dennison, various voices	Recurring role
2024–2025	The Second Best Hospital in the Galaxy	Flork 2 (voice)	13 episodes
2025	Electric Bloom	Stephanie Bradley	2 episodes
2026	Going Dutch	—N/a	Director (2 episodes)
2026	Kevin	Shirley MacLaine (voice)	Episode: "Fourth of July"
2026	Life, Larry and the Pursuit of Unhappiness	Laura Keene	Episode: "Lincoln"
