= Dice (TV series) =

American comedy television series

- Genre: Sitcom
- Created by: Scot Armstrong
- Starring: Andrew Dice Clay; Kevin Corrigan; Natasha Leggero
- Composer: Delicate Steve
- Country of origin: United States
- Original language: English
- No. of seasons: 2
- No. of episodes: 13

Production
- Executive producers: Scot Armstrong; Bruce Rubenstein; Brian Gatewood; Alexandro Tanaka; Andrew Dice Clay; Bryan Furst; Sean Furst
- Producers: Chris Plourde; Chris Smirnoff
- Cinematography: John Tanzer
- Editors: Adam Burr; Tony Orcena; Peter CabadaHagan
- Camera setup: Single-camera
- Running time: 24–28 minutes
- Production companies: Olé Productions; American Work Inc. Fox 21 Television Studios; Showtime Networks

Original release
- Network: Showtime
- Release: April 10, 2016 – October 8, 2017

Dice is an American comedy television series created by Scot Armstrong starring Andrew Dice Clay as himself. On March 20, 2015, Showtime ordered a six-episode first season. The series premiered on Showtime on April 10, 2016. On September 22, 2016, Showtime renewed Dice for a seven-episode second season, which premiered on August 20, 2017. On January 30, 2018, it was announced that the series had been canceled after two seasons.

== Premise ==
Dice follows "the stops and starts of Andrew Dice Clay’s career resurgence in his transplanted home base of Las Vegas. Mired in Sin City’s suburbs, Clay tries to live his life while still trapped in the skin of his infamous character. You remember: the adult nursery rhymes, the insults, the ban from MTV, the deliberate controversy. He works to pay back his gambling debts, manage his sons’ heavy metal band and fend off pumped-up fans — all while sporting his trademark black leather jacket and fingerless gloves, poised for a comeback."

== Cast and characters ==
=== Main ===
- Andrew Dice Clay as himself
- Kevin Corrigan as "Milkshake"
- Natasha Leggero as Carmen

=== Recurring ===
- Brad Morris as Brett
- Cedric Yarbrough as Russell Patterson
- Ron Livingston as Sydney Stein
- Patrick Fischler as Toby
- Chris Williams as Marvin
- David Arquette as himself
- Mary Holland as Trudy
- Andrew Daly as Richard
- Lorraine Bracco as Toni
- Billy Gardell as Frank Rizanski
- James Woods as himself

=== Guest ===
- Adrien Brody as himself ("Ego")
- Criss Angel as himself ("Prestige")
- Wayne Newton as himself ("Prestige")
- Rita Rudner as herself ("Prestige")
- Michael Rapaport as Bobby the Mooch ("Six Grand")
- Joe Lo Truglio as Roger ("It's a Miserable Life")
- Laraine Newman as Darcy ("No Bullshit")
- Tony Orlando as himself ("No Bullshit")
- Michael Imperioli as himself ("Fingerless")
- Mickey Rourke as himself ("Fingerless")
- Yakov Smirnoff as himself ("The Trial")

== Episodes ==
Season	Episodes	Originally released	
Season	Episodes	First released	Last released
1	6	April 10, 2016	May 15, 2016
2	7	August 20, 2017	October 8, 2017

=== Season 1 (2016) ===
No. overall	No. in season	Title	Directed by	Written by	Original release date	Prod. code	US viewers (millions)
1	1	"Elvis"	Scot Armstrong	Jackie Clarke	April 1, 2016 (online); April 10, 2016 (Showtime)	1BEL104/S104	0.254
2	2	"Ego"	Jay Karas	Brian Gatewood & Alessandro Tanaka	April 17, 2016	1BEL106/S106	0.180
3	3	"Prestige"	Scot Armstrong	Scot Armstrong, Brian Gatewood & Alessandro Tanaka	April 24, 2016	1BEL103/S103	0.165
4	4	"Alimony"	Scot Armstrong	Scot Armstrong	May 1, 2016	1BEL101/S101	0.171
5	5	"Sal Maldonado"	Scot Armstrong	Brian Gatewood & Alessandro Tanaka	May 8, 2016	1BEL102/S102	0.155
6	6	"Six Grand"	Jay Karas	Brian Gatewood & Alessandro Tanaka	May 15, 2016	1BEL105/S105	0.220

=== Season 2 (2017) ===
No. overall	No. in season	Title	Directed by	Written by	Original release date	Prod. code	US viewers (millions)
7	1	"It's a Miserable Life"	Scot Armstrong	Brian Gatewood & Alessandro Tanaka	August 7, 2017 (online); August 20, 2017 (Showtime)	2BEL201	0.177
8	2	"Big Fan"	Scot Armstrong	Brian Gatewood & Alessandro Tanaka	August 27, 2017	2BEL202	0.135
9	3	"No Bullshit"	Todd Biermann	Sarah Afkami	September 10, 2017	2BEL203	0.183
10	4	"The Twelve"	Todd Biermann	Scot Armstrong	September 17, 2017	2BEL204	0.105
11	5	"The Old Man"	Jay Karas	Scot Armstrong	September 24, 2017	2BEL205	0.170
12	6	"Fingerless"	Jay Karas	Brian Gatewood & Alessandro Tanaka	October 1, 2017	2BEL206	0.137
13	7	"The Trial"	Tamra Davis	Scot Armstrong	October 8, 2017	2BEL207	0.115

== Production ==
=== Broadcast ===
The pilot was made available on April 1, 2016, through Amazon Prime, Apple TV, YouTube, Hulu, Roku, PlayStation Vue and other streaming platforms and all six episodes were made available on April 10, 2016, via Showtime's streaming services and on-demand.

== Reception ==
The first season of Dice has been met with mixed reviews from critics. On the review aggregation website Rotten Tomatoes, the first season holds a 33% approval rating with an average rating of 5.26 out of 10 based on 15 reviews. The website's critical consensus reads, "The Dice man is back with a few surprisingly funny guest stars, but they're not enough to salvage a series of unfunny storylines." Metacritic, which uses a weighted average, assigned the season a score of 56 out of 100 based on 16 reviews, indicating "mixed or average reviews".
