= Bar Fight! =

- Directed by: Jim Mahoney
- Written by: Jim Mahoney
- Produced by: Sarah Gabriel; Marc Goldberg; James Harris; Mark Lane
- Starring: Luka Jones; Melissa Fumero; Rachel Bloom
- Cinematography: Peter Mosiman
- Edited by: Nicholas Wenger
- Production companies: Ingenious Media; Particular Crowd; Signature Films; Tea Shop Productions
- Distributed by: IFC Films
- Release date: November 11, 2022
- Running time: 84 minutes
- Country: United States
- Language: English
- Box office: $3,300

Bar Fight! is an American comedy film written and directed by Jim Mahoney. It follows former couple Allen (Luka Jones) and Nina (Melissa Fumero) who compete over who gets to stay at their local bar following their breakup. The film was released on November 11, 2022, on AMC+, on demand, and in theaters. It received generally negative reviews.

== Plot ==
After splitting everything after their breakup, former couple Nina and Allen fight over who will keep their favorite local bar.

== Cast ==
- Luka Jones as Allen
- Melissa Fumero as Nina
- Rachel Bloom as Chelsea
- Nicolette Acosta as Dart Girl
- Mitzi Akaha as Amanda in the leather jacket
- Patrick Byas as Tyler
- David Carzell as William
- Daniel Dorr as Mason
- Christine Estabrook as Copper Mug Thief
- Caroline Harris as Tiffany
- Dot-Marie Jones as Elena
- Remington Hoffman as Alexander
- Hope Lauren as Autumn
- Dino Nicandros as Cameron
- Nick Psinakis as Fedora Guy
- Romy Rosemont as Karen
- Vik Sahay as Dick
- Shontae Saldana as Jaz
- Adriana Acedo Campillo as Bar Patron (uncredited)
- Audrey Kilpatrick as Bar Patron (uncredited)
- Samantha Lawless as Bar Patron (uncredited)
- Elsa Ryder as Bar Patron (uncredited)

== Release ==
Bar Fight! was released on AMC+, on demand, and in theaters on November 11, 2022.

== Reception ==
On the review aggregator website Rotten Tomatoes, 18% of 11 critics' reviews are positive, with an average rating of 4.6/10.
