= Forever35 =

American podcast

Cast and voices
- Hosted by: Kate Spencer and Doree Shafrir

Music
- Theme music composed by: Riot

Production
- Production: Samee Junio

Publication
- No. of episodes: 116 (as of April 16, 2020)
- Original release: January 17, 2018

Reception
- Cited for: iHeartRadio Best Beauty & Fashion Podcast (2019)

Related
- Website: forever35podcast.com

Forever35 is a Los Angeles–based podcast hosted by writers Kate Spencer and Doree Shafrir about the things they do to take care of themselves. Launched in 2018, the show consists of full length episodes that feature personal life updates and interviews with guests about self-care and mini episodes focused on responding to listener questions. Initially produced as an independent podcast, Spencer and Shafrir signed with Acast in 2019 to better support the development of the show.

Guests on the show are predominantly women and gender non-conforming, ranging from other writers and skincare experts to friends and entertainers. They have included Jasmine Guillory, Sierra Teller Ornelas, Sinéad Burke, Alison Roman, Keiko Agena and fellow podcast hosts Nora McInerny, Jackie Johnson and Gretchen Rubin. In 2019 Spencer and Shafrir interviewed clothing designer Miranda Bennett during a live recording of the show at SXSW.

The show has gained positive attention from publications like Time, Nylon and Houstonia for emphasizing the need for women to physically and mentally take care of themselves, regardless of the form those activities take. Huffington post writer Jillian Capewell praised the podcast for sounding: "like you’re eavesdropping on a conversation between your friends." In 2020 the show won the award for Best Beauty & Fashion Podcast at the iHeartRadio Podcast Awards.
