= Kate Spencer (author) =

American author, comedian, and podcast host

- Occupations: Writer, podcast host
- Known for: Forever35

Kate Spencer is an American author, comedian, and podcast host.

Spencer was raised in Wellesley, Massachusetts. She obtained a degree in women's studies from Bates College. After graduation she wrote for several publications and worked for several years as a senior producer and on-air host at VH1.

Spencer's first book The Dead Moms Club: A Memoir about Death, Grief, and Surviving the Mother of All Losses (2017) documented losing her mother to pancreatic cancer. She has co-hosted the self-care podcast Forever35, with author Doree Shafrir, since 2018. The show began after she suggested to Shafrir that the adapt their conversations about skincare into a podcast. It was named Best Beauty & Fashion Podcast at the 2020 iHeartRadio Podcast Awards.

Spencer lives in Los Angeles with her husband, Anthony King, and their two children. The couple met in New York, where they were both involved with the Upright Citizens Brigade.
