= Jason Mantzoukas =

American actor (born 1972)

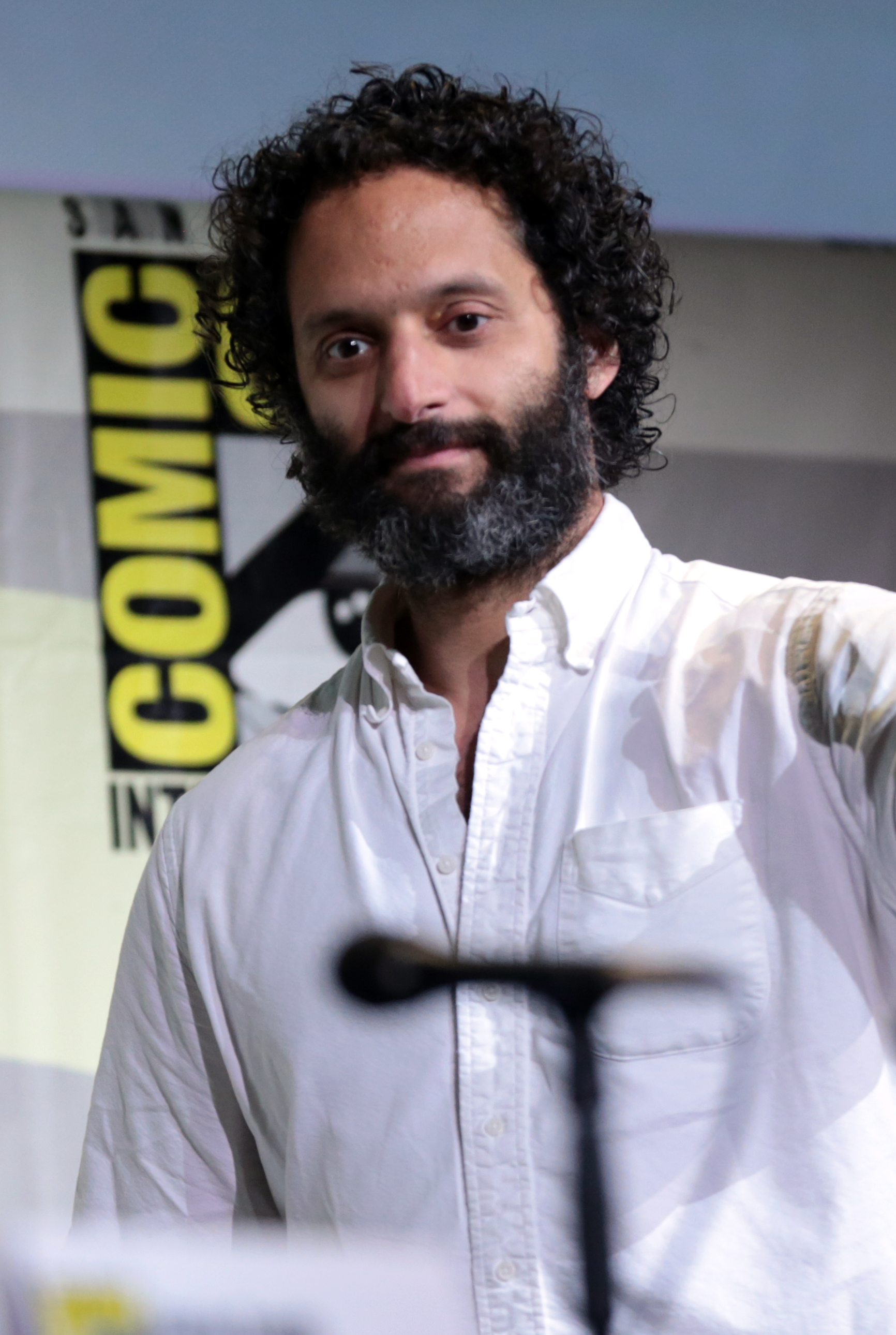
- Mantzoukas at the 2016 San Diego Comic Con
- Born: December 18, 1972 (age 53); Lynn, Massachusetts, U.S.
- Education: Middlebury College (AB)
- Occupations: Actor; comedian; podcaster; writer
- Years active: 1998–present

Jason Mantzoukas (/mænˈzuːkəs/; born December 18, 1972) is an American actor, comedian, podcaster and screenwriter. He is known for his roles as Rafi in the FX comedy series The League and as Nadal in Sacha Baron Cohen's The Dictator (2012), and he is one of the three co-hosts of the podcast How Did This Get Made? alongside Paul Scheer and June Diane Raphael.

After beginning his career as an improv comedian, he has played several comedic roles in film and television. He appeared in the films Conception (2011), They Came Together (2014), Sleeping with Other People (2015), The Long Dumb Road (2018), and John Wick: Chapter 3 – Parabellum (2019). He has had recurring roles on four TV series created by Michael Schur, portraying Dennis Feinstein in Parks and Recreation, Adrian Pimento in Brooklyn Nine-Nine, Derek Hoffstetler in The Good Place, and Apollo Lambrakis in A Man on the Inside. In 2025, he appeared as a contestant in series 19 of British comedy game show Taskmaster.

Mantzoukas also voices the characters Jay Bilzerian in the Netflix animated series Big Mouth, Alex Dorpenberger in the HBO Max animated series Close Enough, Rex Splode in the Amazon Prime animated series Invincible, The Gray One in HouseBroken, Chumsley in Gabby's Dollhouse: The Movie, and Jankom Pog in the Paramount+ animated series Star Trek: Prodigy.

== Early life and education ==
Mantzoukas was born December 18, 1972, in Lynn, Massachusetts. At the age of four, his family moved to Nahant, a town nearby to Lynn. He is the oldest child of Cynthia (née Mourousas) and William Mantzoukas, second-generation Greek-Americans. He has one younger sister, Melissa. He has described himself as "100 percent Greek".

Mantzoukas began taking drum lessons at age 10 and studied under Steve Barrett for over 8 years. In interviews, he has cited Stewart Copeland, Stephen Perkins from Jane's Addiction, and Jimmy Chamberlin from The Smashing Pumpkins as his biggest influences as a young musician. He participated in jazz and marching bands in high school, as well as playing in a cover band called Slygoul. He continued with jazz drumming in college and played for a bebop group.

Mantzoukas attended Swampscott High School, graduating in 1991. While attending, he was named captain of Swampscott's boys' soccer and track teams and was president of the marching band. He attended Middlebury College in Middlebury, Vermont, where he majored in religion. He attempted to defend a "terribly written" honors thesis on religious iconography (which he admits to starting a week prior to his defense date) but was not given credit to graduate with honors.

After graduating from college in 1995, Mantzoukas was granted a Watson Fellowship and traveled throughout North Africa and the Middle East studying religious and transcendental music for nearly two years. He has admitted to having a "horrible [grant proposal] but was charming in the room; so [he earned the grant]." At the time he left for Morocco for the Watson Fellowship, he had already had six auditions and callbacks for the Blue Man Group, but he ultimately decided to travel before the audition process was complete. He lived in Morocco for about 7½ months while studying and recording Gnawa music. While abroad, he traveled to Egypt, Israel, Turkey, Jordan, and Syria. During his time abroad, he was arrested once in Morocco, for having an expired tourist visa, and in Turkey to prevent him from traveling through an active war zone.

== Career ==
=== Early comedy ===
Mantzoukas first began writing comedy sketches during his junior and senior years of high school for variety shows. He began performing short-form improvisational comedy (improv) as a part of the Otter Nonsense Players at Middlebury College and became "obsessed" with improv as it used the same skill set as performing jazz. While performing with the Otters, Mantzoukas met and began learning and practicing long-form improv with fellow performers, Jessica St. Clair, Dan O'Brien, and Rodney Rothman.

=== Upright Citizens Brigade ===
After moving to New York City in 1998, he began performing comedy regularly at the Upright Citizens Brigade Theater (UCB) and was taught by Amy Poehler. He was a member of the improv team "Mother", one of the UCB's earliest house teams. During his time at UCB, Mantzoukas worked in the computer graphics department at J. P. Morgan for over three years to "make ends meet."

Mantzoukas and comedian Ed Herbstman performed as the comedy duo "The Mantzoukas Brothers" for a number of years and were named the "Best Improv Duo" by Time Out New York magazine in 2006. Mantzoukas continued to write and perform as a duo with Jessica St. Clair appearing in the sketch show, "We Used to Go Out" and long-form improv show, "First Date". Together, he and St. Clair pitched a pilot to HBO (which was ultimately not picked up) and earned a deal with Comedy Central. The two were compared to Nichols and May, and continue to collaborate and perform on the podcast Womp It Up!. Mantzoukas taught advanced improv classes at UCB.

=== Television and film ===
Mantzoukas has appeared in the films Baby Mama, I Hate Valentine's Day, The Dictator, and John Wick: Chapter 3 – Parabellum, and starred in The Long Dumb Road. Mantzoukas has a main role in the Paramount+ comedy series No Activity, and has had recurring roles on The League as Rafi, Enlightened, Kroll Show, Parks and Recreation, Comedy Bang! Bang!, Transparent, Brooklyn Nine-Nine, I'm Sorry, and The Good Place.

Mantzoukas has done voice acting work, including main roles on the animated series Big Mouth, Close Enough, HouseBroken, and Star Trek: Prodigy. In 2018, he replaced T.J. Miller as the voice of Mr. Mucus for the Mucinex commercials. In 2022, he was cast as Dionysus/Mr. D in the Disney+ adaptation of the book series Percy Jackson & the Olympians.

In January 2025, Mantzoukas was announced as one of the contestants for the 19th series of Taskmaster, with Fatiha El-Ghorri, Mathew Baynton, Rosie Ramsey, and Stevie Martin. Mantzoukas is the first contestant of the show to not be based in the United Kingdom at the time of filming.

=== Writing ===
In 2008, NBC ordered a pilot for a comedy series written by Mantzoukas called Off Duty. The pilot was filmed in New York starring Bradley Whitford and Romany Malco but the series was not picked up. In interviews in 2014, Mantzoukas announced that he was working on a "loosely autobiographical" television show for Showtime about life after ending a long-term relationship.

Mantzoukas earned credit for writing the screenplay draft of the buddy cop comedy Ride Along, starring Ice Cube and Kevin Hart. He originally was asked to write for Andy Samberg as one of the leads, but the rights to the film were ultimately purchased by Universal Studios who later cast Hart in the role originally intended for Samberg. He has served as a consulting writer and producer on Childrens Hospital and Portlandia.

=== Podcasts ===
Mantzoukas co-hosts the podcast How Did This Get Made? with Paul Scheer and June Diane Raphael. Mantzoukas regularly makes appearances on Comedy Bang! Bang!, Womp It Up!, Reply All, and Doughboys.

== Personal life ==
As of 2015, he was living in Los Angeles.

Mantzoukas does not use social media, saying in 2015: "From the very beginning, when IM-ing first became a thing, I was like, "Why? What's this about?" They just didn't interest me. I completely understand social media as a method of promotion and digesting information, but it just seems like a colossal waste of time to me, and there's a million other ways I'd rather waste my time." However, he will browse sites like Twitter if "something is blowing up or somebody posts a picture that everyone is talking about, then I'll go look at it."

Mantzoukas was born with an egg allergy and experiences anaphylaxis if he ingests eggs. He has cited this allergy as the cause of his hypochondriac tendencies.

He was previously in a relationship with actress Connie Britton.

== Filmography ==
=== Film ===
Year	Title	Role	Notes
2004	Terrorists	John Stevens	
2007	American Loser	Luggage Channel Guy	
2008	Baby Mama	Gay Couple	
2009	I Hate Valentine's Day	Brian Blowdell	
2009	Splinterheads	The Amazing Steve	
2010	Please Give	Shopper	
2011	Conception	Brian	
2012	The Dictator	Nadal	
2014	Ride Along	—N/a	Writer
2014	They Came Together	Bob	
2014	Neighbors	Doctor Theodorakis	
2014	Adult Beginners	Herman	
2014	Stretch	Manny the Valet	
2014	Search Party	The Amazing Hugo	
2015	Sleeping with Other People	Xander	
2015	Regular Show: The Movie	Mr. Ross	Voice
2015	The Night Before	Bad Santa #1	
2016	Dirty Grandpa	Tan Pam	
2016	Donald Trump's The Art of the Deal: The Movie	Homeless Man	
2016	How to Be Single	George	
2017	The Lego Batman Movie	Scarecrow	Voice
2017	The Disaster Artist	Peter Anway	
2017	The House	Frank Theodorakis	
2018	The Long Dumb Road	Richard	
2018	Ralph Breaks the Internet	Hey Nongman	Voice cameo
2019	John Wick: Chapter 3 – Parabellum	Tick Tock Man	
2020	Dolittle	James the Dragonfly	Voice
2021	Infinite	Artisan	
2021	America: The Motion Picture	Samuel Adams	Voice
2025	Gabby's Dollhouse: The Movie	Chumsley	Voice
2025	The Twits	Mayor Wayne John John-John	Voice
2027	Gatto	Rico	Voice

=== Television ===
Year	Title	Role	Notes
2000	Upright Citizens Brigade	Orgy Man	Episode: "Sex"
2007	Human Giant	Human Giant's #1 Fan	Episode: "24 Hour Marathon"
2008	Squidbillies	Pine Booby	Voice, episode: "Flight of the Deep Fried Pine Booby"
2010–2012	The Life & Times of Tim	Various voices	3 episodes
2010–2015	The League	Rafi	30 episodes; also writer
2010	Lee Mathers	Victor Dekmajian	Television film
2011	Childrens Hospital	Mole Man	Episode: "Newsreaders"; Also writer and consulting producer
2011	Traffic Light	Dimitry	Episode: "En Fuego"
2011–2013	Enlightened	Omar Ali	8 episodes
2011–2015, 2020	Parks and Recreation	Dennis Feinstein	5 episodes
2012	NTSF:SD:SUV::	Hank Schiller	Episode: "Comic-Con-Flict"
2013	Bob's Burgers	Mr. Manoogian	Voice, episode: "The Unnatural"
2013	The Greatest Event in Television History	Director	Episode: "Too Close for Comfort"
2013	Hole to Hole!	Ashleigh Dangerhole	Television film
2013	Modern Family	Kenny	Episode: "Party Crasher"
2013–2015	Kroll Show	Various	9 episodes
2013–2016	Comedy Bang! Bang!	Himself / Chef Emeril Lugosi	4 episodes
2014	Broad City	Creepy DJ #2	Episode: "Fattest Asses"
2014	Playing House	C.J. Wolfe	Episode: "Drumline"
2014	Review	Crazed Driver	Episode: "Road Rage; Orgy"
2014–2017	Transparent	Dr. Steve	5 episodes
2014–2018	Drunk History	Various	3 episodes
2015	Community	Matt Lundergard	Episode: "Queer Studies & Advanced Waxing"
2015	Regular Show	Various voices	3 episodes
2016	Animals.	Fink	Voice, episode: "Rats."
2016	Gilmore Girls: A Year in the Life	Robert Castellanos	Episode: "Spring"
2016	Mr. Neighbor's House	—N/a	Executive producer, creator, writer
2016–2017	Bajillion Dollar Propertie$	Jerry	2 episodes
2016–2017	Lady Dynamite	Karl Grisham	2 episodes
2016–2017	We Bare Bears	Scientist	Voice, 2 episodes
2016–2021	Brooklyn Nine-Nine	Adrian Pimento	11 episodes
2016–2022	American Dad!	Various voices	6 episodes
2017	Comrade Detective	Drago	Voice, 6 episodes
2017	HarmonQuest	Grabble Gribble	Episode: "The City of Forlona"
2017	Workaholics	Isaac Lubetkin	Episode: "Party Gawds"
2017–2019	I'm Sorry	Kyle	6 episodes
2017–2020	The Good Place	Derek Hoffstetler	9 episodes
2017–2025	Big Mouth	Jay Bilzerian / various voices	Voice, 81 episodes
2017–2021	No Activity	Marco / Dustin Kasprowicz	18 episodes
2018	Mr. Neighbor's House 2	—N/a	Executive producer, creator, writer
2018–2019	Nailed It!	Himself	2 episodes
2019	Legion	Jerome Wolf	Episode: "Chapter 25"
2019	Dickinson	Bee	Voice, 3 episodes
2019–2020	Rise of the Teenage Mutant Ninja Turtles	Carl Sando	Voice, 3 episodes
2020	Solar Opposites	Vanbo	Voice, episode: "Retrace-Your-Step-Alizer"
2020	The Shivering Truth		Voice, episode: "Nesslessness"
2020	Magical Girl Friendship Squad	The Emptier	Voice, episode: "Just Two Weak Girls"
2020–2021	The George Lucas Talk Show	Himself	3 episodes
2020–2021	DuckTales	Steelbeak	Voice, 3 episodes
2020–2022	Close Enough	Alex Dorpenberger	Voice, 24 episodes
2021	Robot Chicken	Jughead Jones	Voice, episode: "The Bleepin' Robot Chicken Archie Comics Special"
2021-2025	Invincible	Rex Splode, Rudy "Rex" Connors	Voice, 20 episodes
2021	The Wonderful World of Mickey Mouse	Huckster McBackstabber	Voice, episode: "Duet for Two"
2021	Ultra City Smiths	Tim Snodgrass	Voice, 5 episodes
2021–2024	Star Trek: Prodigy	Jankom Pog	Voice, main role
2021–2023	HouseBroken	The Gray One	Voice, main role
2022	We Baby Bears	Zorpo	Voice, episode: "Big Trouble Little Babies"
2022	Pam & Tommy	Penis of Tommy Lee	Voice, episode: "I Love You, Tommy"
2022	Roar	Dave	Episode: "The Woman Who Was Fed by a Duck"
2022	Paper Girls	Grand Father	3 episodes
2023	History of the World, Part II	Greek Ambassador	Episode: "VII"
2023	Agent Elvis	Howard Hughes	Voice, 6 episodes
2023	Twisted Metal	Preacher	Episode: "EV3L1N"
2023	Obliterated	Gremlin	Voice, 6 episodes
2023–2026	Percy Jackson and the Olympians	Dionysus	7 episodes
2024	The Simpsons	Finn Bon Idée	Voice, episode: "Night of the Living Wage"
2024	Velma	Scrappy-Doo	Voice, 3 episodes
2024	Lego Marvel Avengers: Mission Demolition	Deadpool	Voice, Disney+ special
2024	Krapopolis	Invasion General	Voice, episode: "Mr. Boogens"
2024–2025	Star Wars: Young Jedi Adventures	Bulcha the Hutt	Voice, 2 episodes
2025	Taskmaster	Himself	Series 19, 10 episodes
2025	Star Wars: Young Jedi Adventures	Racer #3	Voice, episode "Tenoo's Fastest"
2025	A Man on the Inside	Apollo Lambrakis	3 episodes
2026	Taskmaster	Sports Commentator	Voice, Series 21 episode 6
2026	The Fall and Rise of Reggie Dinkins	Peter Za	Episode: "Hulk Want Candy"

=== Video games ===
Year	Title	Role	Notes
2016	Fortnite: Save The World	Blakebeard the Blackhearted	
2022	Star Trek Prodigy: Supernova	Jankom Pog (voice)	
2026	Invincible VS	Rex Splode	Story Mode

== Podcast and radio appearances ==
In addition to hosting How Did This Get Made?, Mantzoukas also has been a guest on a number of podcasts.

Year	Title	Episode(s)
2010–present	Comedy Bang! Bang!	81 episodes
2011–2015	Doug Loves Movies	7 episodes
2011–2015	Affirmation Nation	9 episodes
2012	Sklarbro Country	"Hotzi"
2012	Jordan, Jesse Go!	"Ep 244 Hashtag Friend Zone"
2012	Earwolf Presents	"The Christmas Womptacular"
2012–2013	You Made It Weird with Pete Holmes	2 episodes
2012, 2014	Totally Laime	2 episodes
2012–2017	Who Charted?	5 episodes
2012–2018	improv4humans	6 episodes
2013	Kevin Pollak's Chat Show	"Jason Mantzoukas"
2013	The Dead Authors Podcast	"Chapter 24: Plato, featuring Jason Mantzoukas"
2013	WireTap	"S10E09: Trapped"
2014	The K Ohle with Kurt Braunohler	"The Boat Show with Jason Mantzoukas"
2014	Never Not Funny	"Episode 1517 - Jason Mantzoukas"
2014, 2018	The Andy Daly Podcast Pilot Project	2 episodes
2014–2020	Hollywood Handbook	3 episodes
2015	Reading Aloud	"#25 Jason Mantzoukas, Robert Baker, Crispin Whittell"
2015	Crybabies	"Jason Mantzoukas"
2015	Black List Table Reads	"Balls Out"
2015–2017	Gilmore Guys	7 episodes
2015–2020	Womp It Up!	9 episodes
2016	Don't Get Me Started	"Jason Mantzoukas - Improv"
2016	Spontaneanation	"Rented Cabin in the Mountains"
2016	With Special Guest Lauren Lapkus	"Jason Mantzoukas: What Went Wrong?"
2016	Unqualified	#20, #52
2016	How To Be Less Old	"Jason Mantzoukas Is #NotOnTwitterGuys"
2016–2017	FOUND	2 episodes
2016–2019	The Watch	8 episodes
2016–2020	Reply All	#58, #80, #134, #165
2017	WTF with Marc Maron	"Jason Mantzoukas"
2017	K&B Podcast	"Wednesday, June 28th"
2017	Dumb People Town	"Jason Mantzoukas - Dibblin' a Toe In"
2017	UCB Long-Form Conversations	"Paul Scheer/Jason Mantzoukas"
2017	DTR - The Official Tinder Podcast	"JU-LI-A"
2018	UCB Sports & Leisure	"What about Blotch? (w/ Jason Mantzoukas)"
2018	Maisel Goys	"Season One (with Jason Mantzoukas)"
2018	Dr. Gameshow	"#NAHSMYOZ"
2018	R U Talkin' R.E.M. RE: ME?	"Covers of R.E.M. with Jason Mantzoukas"
2018	Heavy Friending	"Joe and Laura Talk to Jason Mantzoukas at Austin Film Festival"
2018	Raised By TV	"Zoom Zoom (w/ Jason Mantzoukas)"
2018	KFC Radio	"Jason Mantzoukas, Back 2 School with Large, and Frankie's Groupie"
2018	My TV Family	"Austin Film Festival Review"
2018	The Comic's Comic Presents Last Things First	"Episode #235: Jason Mantzoukas"
2018	Back to One	"Jason Mantzoukas"
2018–2019	The Good Place: The Podcast	Ch. 21, Ch. 38
2018–present	Doughboys	5 episodes
2019	Armchair Expert	"Jason Mantzoukas"
2019	Aquarium Drunkard	"Transmissions Podcast: Jason Mantzoukas/Remembering Sara Romweber/Low: On Double Negative"
2019	Off Camera	"Jason Mantzoukas"
2019	Wild Horses: The Perspective	"Jason Mantzoukas: For Who Could Ever Love A Beast"
2019	The TV Campfire	"The League Reunion (Live from ATX Season 8)"
2019	The Need to Fail	"Jason Mantzoukas"
2020	Brooklyn Nine-Nine: The Podcast	2 episodes
2020	Off Book	"Jason Mantzoukas in Off Book: Undercover"
2020	Beef and Dairy Network	"Introducing … Bimpsie!"
2020	Binge Mode: Weekly	"Jason Mantzoukas Part 1", "Jason Mantzoukas Part 2"
2020	The Scaredy Cats Horror Show	"#1 The Exorcist"
2020	How Did This Get Played?	"Street Fighter The Movie with Jason Mantzoukas & Paul Scheer"
2020	Thirst Aid Kit	"A Dog Called Rex (with Jason Mantzoukas)"
2020	Bonanas for Bonanza	"The Saga of Annie O'Toole"
2020	Selected Shorts	"Child's Play"
2020	I Will Write Your Book	"Feel the Beat - Jason Mantzoukas"
2020	We Have To Stop Talkin' TMNT On CBB	"TMNT 3 w/ Jason Mantzoukas"
2020	Home Cooking	"Fronds with Benefits (with Jason Mantzoukas)"
2020	The Last Laugh	"Jason Mantzoukas Is Comedy's Go-To 'Maniac'"
2020–2021	Hello from the Magic Tavern	2 episodes
2020–2025	Blank Check with Griffin & David	4 episodes
2021	Three Questions with Andy Richter	"Jason Mantzoukas"
2021	Mega	2 episodes
2021	Circle Round	"The Missing Knight feat. Sarah, Duchess of York & Jason Mantzoukas"
2021	The Ringer-Verse	3 episodes
2021	Movies That Changed My Life	"Jason Mantzoukas: Harold and Maude, The Big Lebowski, and Wall Street: Money Never Sleeps"
2021	Ask Ronna	"A Little Bit of Vomit in Every Kiss with Jason Mantzoukas"
2021	X-Ray Vision	"The Marvelous MCU TV Shows of Disney+"
2022	The Sporkful	"Jason Mantzoukas Sees Every Meal as a Threat"
2023	Parks and Recreation	"Jason Mantzoukas: Citizen Knope (S4 E10)"
2024	Off Menu with Ed Gamble and James Acaster	"Episode #252: Jason Mantzoukas"
2025	Taskmaster Podcast	"Ep 205. Jason Mantzoukas - Series 19 Ep.5"
2026	Ask Hank Anything	"Should I Wipe My Dog’s Butt?: Jason Mantzoukas Asks Hank Anything"
