= Best Friends Forever (American TV series) =

American sitcom television series

- Genre: Sitcom
- Created by: Lennon Parham; Jessica St. Clair
- Directed by: Fred Savage
- Starring: Lennon Parham; Jessica St. Clair; Luka Jones; Stephen Schneider; Daija Owens
- Composer: Jim Dooley
- Country of origin: United States
- Original language: English
- No. of seasons: 1
- No. of episodes: 6

Production
- Executive producers: Jessica St. Clair; Lennon Parham; Scot Armstrong; Ravi Nandan; Alexa Junge; Fred Savage
- Camera setup: Single-camera
- Running time: 22 minutes
- Production companies: Parham St. Clair Productions; American Work, Inc.; Universal Television; Open 4 Business Productions

Original release
- Network: NBC
- Release: April 4 – June 1, 2012

Best Friends Forever is an American sitcom television series that ran on NBC from April 4, to June 1, 2012. The series aired during the 2011–12 NBC primetime season as a mid-season replacement and was created by real-life best friends Lennon Parham and Jessica St. Clair. The pilot episode was made available early through Hulu and NBC.com on March 21, 2012. NBC officially canceled the series on May 11, 2012, after only 4 episodes were broadcast.

== Series synopsis ==
When Jessica's (Jessica St. Clair) husband files for divorce, she flies across the country to seek comfort and move back in with her best friend Lennon (Lennon Parham). However, Lennon's boyfriend Joe (Luka Jones) has recently moved in and has a hard time fitting into Lennon and Jessica's close friendship.

== Cast and characters ==
- Lennon Parham as Lennon Walker, Jessica's best friend and old roommate, living in New York City.
- Jessica St. Clair as Jessica Black, Lennon's best friend who moves back in with Lennon and her boyfriend after getting recently divorced.
- Luka Jones as Joe Foley, Lennon's live-in boyfriend.
- Stephen Schneider as Rav Stark, Jessica's old friend, who has unresolved feelings for Jessica.
- Daija Owens as Queenetta Carpenter, Jessica and Lennon's precocious nine-year-old neighbor.

== Development and production ==
NBC placed a pilot order on February 7, 2011. The series was created by Lennon Parham and Jessica St. Clair with the pilot directed by Fred Savage. The series was executive produced by Jessica St. Clair, Lennon Parham, Scot Armstrong, Alexa Junge, Fred Savage and Ravi Nandan and the production company's Universal Media Studios and American Work.

NBC ordered the pilot to series on May 13, 2011 as a midseason entry in the 2011–12 United States network television schedule. Six episodes were produced for the first season. Adam Pally originally played the role of Joe, Parham's boyfriend, in the pilot, however with ABC renewing Pally's other show Happy Endings, the role was recast. On August 12, 2011, Luka Jones was cast in the role of Joe, replacing Pally.

On April 27, 2012, it was announced that NBC has pulled the series off their schedule "indefinitely", leaving two of the six filmed episodes left unaired. Parham stated a desire to post the remaining episodes online. However, on May 1, 2012 NBC announced that they would air the remaining episodes on Friday June 1, 2012.

== Episodes ==
Every episode of the series was directed by Fred Savage.

No.	Title	Written by	Original release date	U.S. viewers (millions)
1	"Pilot"	Lennon Parham & Jessica St. Clair	April 4, 2012	3.94
After being served divorce papers, Jessica moves back to Brooklyn to live with her best friend Lennon. However, things aren't quite as they used to be due to Lennon's live-in boyfriend, Joe. Meanwhile, since moving back to the city, Jessica decides to re-connect with her old friend, Rav, however, her return isn't met with positivity by the girls' neighbor, Queenetta.
2	"The Butt Dial"	Lennon Parham & Jessica St. Clair	April 11, 2012	2.78
Jessica accidentally butt-dials her ex-husband, Peter, on their anniversary, which doesn't have the best of outcomes. So in an attempt get her mind off the whole ordeal, Lennon and Joe, convince Rav to allow Jessica to work at the bar, that is until Peter shows up.
3	"Put a Pin in It"	Donick Cary & Anthony King	April 18, 2012	2.83
In an attempt to please Joe's mother (Mimi Kennedy), Lennon attempts to give Joe's father (J. K. Simmons) the perfect gift for his retirement party. Jessica receives her belongings from her divorce.
4	"Single and Lovin' It"	Alexa Junge & Anthony King	April 25, 2012	2.65
Jessica's old crush (Ryan Hansen) messages her on Facebook, so in an attempt to get back into the dating scene, she takes dating advice from Rav. Lennon and Joe have a hard time trying to get intimate, since Jessica moved back in.
5	"Hey Nonny Nonny"	John Blickstead & Trey Kollmer	June 1, 2012	2.14
Jessica is forced to share her best friend helping duties when Lennon's former dance partner Ken, arrives to help Lennon plan the open house for her dance studio. Meanwhile, Joe begins to question Ken's sexuality.
6	"Fatal Blow Out"	Lennon Parham & Jessica St. Clair	June 1, 2012	1.76
Joe, Lennon, Jessica, and Rav head to Atlantic City for a gaming convention to debut Joe's videogame. The ladies quickly realize that in order for Joe to win Fan Favorite, they will need to cater to the nerds. Meanwhile, an unexpected encounter between Jessica and Rav has them questioning their true feelings for each other.
