= Playing House (TV series) =

- Genre: Sitcom
- Created by: Lennon Parham; Jessica St. Clair
- Starring: Lennon Parham; Jessica St. Clair; Keegan-Michael Key; Zach Woods; Brad Morris
- Opening theme: "Back Before We Were Brittle" by Say Hi
- Country of origin: United States
- Original language: English
- No. of seasons: 3
- No. of episodes: 26

Production
- Executive producers: Lennon Parham; Jessica St. Clair; Scot Armstrong; Judah Miller; Ravi Nandan
- Producers: Keith Raskin; Jake Aust
- Camera setup: Single-camera
- Running time: 30 minutes
- Production companies: Universal Cable Productions; A24 Films; Parham St. Clair Productions; Open 4 Business Productions

Original release
- Network: USA Network
- Release: April 29, 2014 – July 14, 2017

Playing House is an American sitcom that premiered on April 29, 2014, on the USA Network. Lennon Parham and Jessica St. Clair created and star in the series, which is inspired by their real-life friendship.

On January 14, 2016, the series was renewed for a third season, which aired from June 23 to July 14, 2017 with each episode available via VOD.

On October 30, 2017, series stars and creators Jessica St. Clair and Lennon Parham, announced over an emotional video message that USA Network canceled the show.

== Premise ==
When mother-to-be Maggie ends her marriage upon discovering her husband's affair with a woman online, she turns to her best friend Emma for support. In order to help Maggie in her time of need, Emma gives up her successful business career in China to return to their hometown of Pinebrook and help her friend raise her newborn baby.

== Cast ==
=== Main ===
- Lennon Parham as Maggie Caruso – Emma's best friend since childhood, who was pregnant and newly single after a sudden separation from her husband in the first season. She is the mother of Charlotte Emma Caruso.
- Jessica St. Clair as Emma Crawford – Maggie's best friend since childhood. She leaves her overseas job in China to come home and to help Maggie.
- Keegan-Michael Key as Mark Rodriguez – A local cop and childhood friend of Maggie and Emma. Mark and Emma used to date in high school.
- Zach Woods as Zach "Zoo" Harper – Maggie's younger brother.
- Brad Morris as Bruce Caruso – Maggie's ex-husband. He is the father of Charlotte.

=== Recurring ===
- Jane Kaczmarek as Gwen Crawford – Emma's mother.
- Lindsay Sloane as Tina "Bird Bones" Steigerman – Mark's wife and former nemesis to Emma.
- Gerry Bednob as Mr. Nanjiani – a local townsperson, originally from Pakistan.
- Marissa Jaret Winokur as Candy – a bartender at Rosie's, the local restaurant.
- Ian Roberts as Ian – Mark's partner on the police force.
- Sandy Martin as Mary Pat – Bruce's mother.
- Norma Michaels as Ms. Johannsen – a prickly old woman living in the town.
- Kyle Bornheimer as Dan – a Rabbi.
- Ben Willbond as Dr. Clive Ericson, a cold and distant doctor supervising Maggie on clinical rotation.

== Episodes ==
Season	Episodes	Originally released	
Season	Episodes	First released	Last released
1	10	April 29, 2014	June 17, 2014
2	8	August 4, 2015	September 8, 2015
3	8	June 23, 2017	July 14, 2017

=== Season 1 (2014) ===
No. overall	No. in season	Title	Directed by	Written by	Original release date	US viewers (millions)
1	1	"Pilot"	Jeffrey Blitz	Lennon Parham & Jessica St. Clair	April 29, 2014	0.847
2	2	"Bird Bones"	Jamie Babbit	Anthony King	April 29, 2014	0.766
3	3	"Unfinished Business"	Fred Savage	Joe Wengert	May 6, 2014	0.783
4	4	"Totes Kewl"	Tristram Shapeero	Anthony King	May 13, 2014	0.864
5	5	"Drumline"	Fred Savage	Judah Miller	May 20, 2014	0.802
6	6	"Bosephus and the Catfish"	Tim Kirkby	John Lutz	May 27, 2014	0.859
7	7	"Spaghetti and Meatballs"	Tim Kirkby	Judah Miller	June 3, 2014	0.983
8	8	"37 Weeks"	Michael Trim	Vera Santamaria	June 10, 2014	1.094
9	9	"Let's Have a Baby"	Jeffrey Blitz	Lennon Parham & Jessica St. Clair	June 17, 2014	0.846
10	10	"Bugs in Your Eyes"	Tim Kirkby	Lennon Parham & Jessica St. Clair	June 17, 2014	0.648

=== Season 2 (2015) ===
No. overall	No. in season	Title	Directed by	Written by	Original release date	US viewers (millions)
11	1	"Hello, Old Friend"	Stuart McDonald	Lennon Parham & Jessica St. Clair	August 4, 2015	0.413
12	2	"Sleepless in Pinebrook"	Stuart McDonald	Anthony King	August 4, 2015	0.321
13	3	"Cashmere Burka"	Stuart McDonald	Gavin Steckler	August 11, 2015	0.367
14	4	"Knotty Pine"	Stuart McDonald	Vera Santamaria	August 18, 2015	0.440
15	5	"Employee of the Month"	Stuart McDonald	Anthony King	August 25, 2015	0.439
16	6	"Kimmewah Kup"	Stuart McDonald	Christine Nangle	September 1, 2015	0.484
17	7	"Officer of the Year"	Stuart McDonald	Vera Santamaria	September 8, 2015	0.486
18	8	"Celebrate Me Scones"	Stuart McDonald	Lennon Parham & Jessica St. Clair	September 8, 2015	0.368

=== Season 3 (2017) ===
No. overall	No. in season	Title	Directed by	Written by	Original release date	US viewers (millions)
19	1	"Cookie Jar"	Jessica St. Clair	Lennon Parham & Jessica St. Clair	June 23, 2017	0.381
20	2	"None of Your Business"	Chris Addison	Vera Santamaria	June 23, 2017	0.287
21	3	"Gwen or Lose"	Lennon Parham	Shaun Diston & Andrew Barbot	June 30, 2017	0.360
22	4	"Paging Doctor Yes Please"	Chris Addison	Anthony King	June 30, 2017	0.269
23	5	"You Wanna Roll With This?"	Jeffrey Blitz	Lennon Parham & Jessica St. Clair	July 7, 2017	0.395
24	6	"Ride the Dragon"	Ian Roberts	Vera Santamaria	July 7, 2017	0.294
25	7	"Game of Tweens"	Bob Roe	Anthony King	July 14, 2017	0.353
26	8	"Reverse the Curse"	Bob Roe	Lennon Parham & Jessica St. Clair	July 14, 2017	0.245

== Production and development ==
Playing House first appeared on the USA Network development slate in February 2013, under the name Untitled Lennon Parham/Jessica St. Clair Project. The series was created by Lennon Parham and Jessica St. Clair who also star in the series and executive produce alongside Scot Armstrong and Ravi Nandan, and the production companies Universal Cable Productions and American Work.

Casting announcements began in February 2013, with Parham, St. Clair and Zach Woods announced as starring in the series when USA Network ordered the presentation. Parham and St. Clair signed on to play the lead roles of Maggie, an expectant mother who turns to her career-driven best friend Emma. Keegan-Michael Key and Brad Morris then signed on to the series, with Key playing the role of Mark, a cop who holds resentment towards Emma because she turned down his proposal and left town twelve years earlier, and Morris playing the role of Bruce, Maggie's husband, who cheats on her.

On May 16, 2013, Playing House was ordered to series, making it the second original half-hour comedy series for the USA Network after Sirens.

On December 8, 2014, USA Network renewed Playing House for an eight-episode second season. Through a new model, each of the episodes will be released on video-on-demand platforms before airing a week later on USA. On January 14, 2016, Playing House was renewed for a third season.

== Reception ==
The first season of Playing House scored 65 out of 100 on Metacritic based on 13 "generally favorable" reviews. On another review aggregator site, Rotten Tomatoes, it holds a 72% rating with an average rating of 7.1 out of 10, based on 18 reviews. The site's critical consensus reads: "Jessica St. Clair and Lennon Parham are a comedy duo worth watching, and their chemistry helps to make Playing House reasonably enjoyable and perceptive."

The second season was met with even more positive reviews from critics. On Rotten Tomatoes, it holds an average of 100% with an average of 7 out of 10, based on 6 reviews.

=== Awards and nominations ===
Year	Award	Category	Recipients	Outcome
2015	GLAAD Media Award	Outstanding Individual Episode (in a series without a regular LGBT character)	Let's Have a Baby	Nominated
2016	Critics' Choice Award	Best Supporting Actor in a Comedy Series	Keegan-Michael Key	Nominated
