= Brad Morris =

American actor and television writer

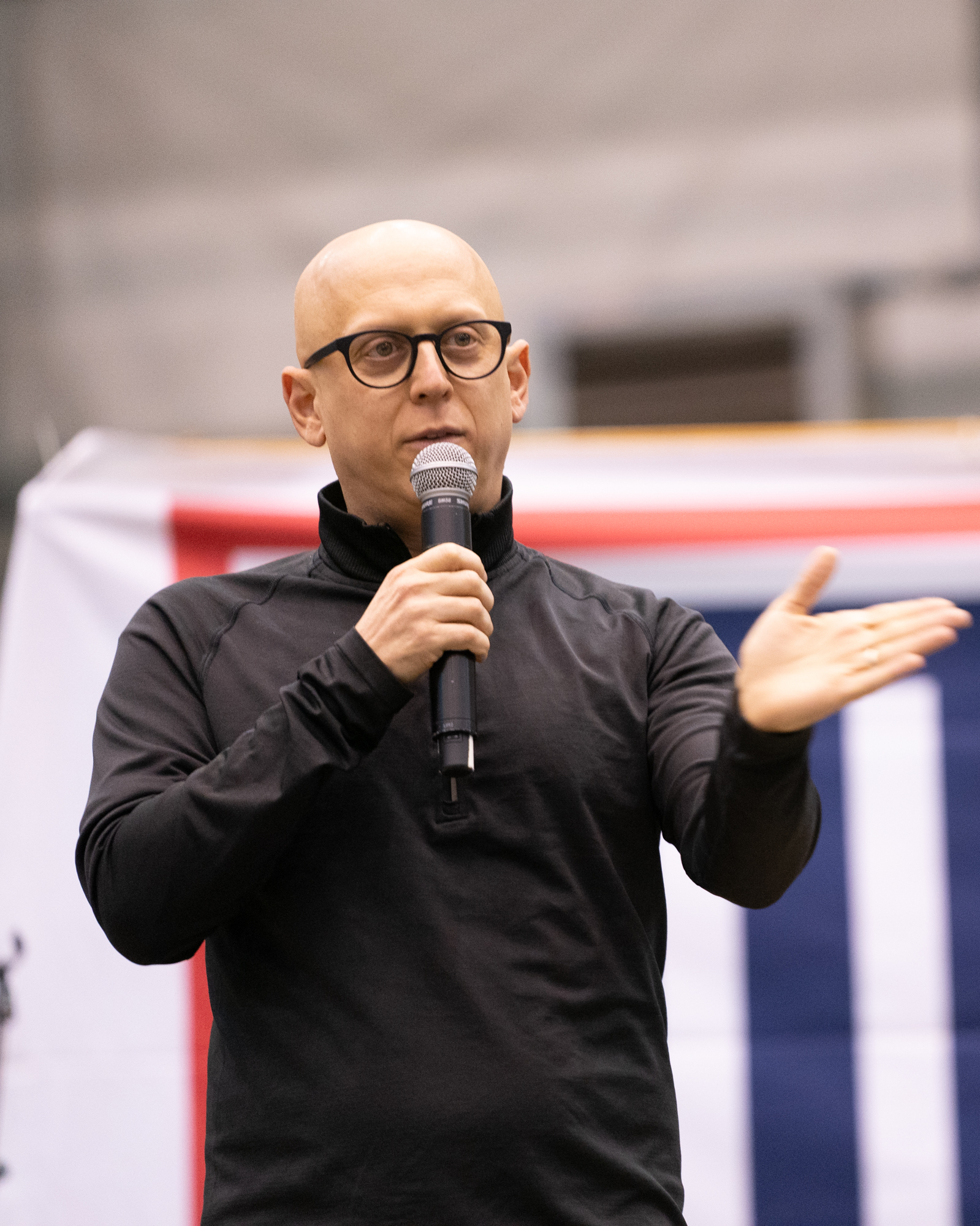
- Morris in 2020
- Born: August 16, 1975 (age 51); Chicago, Illinois, U.S.
- Education: Skidmore College
- Occupations: Actor, writer, comedian
- Years active: 1998–present

Brad Morris (born August 16, 1975) is an American actor and screenwriter. He starred on Playing House (2014–2017) and had recurring roles on Cougar Town (2013–2015) as Jerry, for which he also wrote five episodes, Great News (2017–2018), and Dice (2016–2017).

== Early life ==
Morris was born in Chicago and is a 1998 alumnus of Skidmore College. He trained at iO and The Annoyance and toured with The Second City's touring company before joining its Mainstage cast, where the theater's 50th-anniversary revue was his fourth show. He was working for The Second City before his TV career, writing and performing in up to eight live shows a week for several years. At The Second City, Morris also co-founded the comedy troupes the Reckoning, Stubs, and Uncle's Brother.

== Filmography ==
=== Film ===
Year	Title	Role	Notes
2008	Sugar.	Weird Cook	Short
2008	Special Needs	Brad	Video short
2011	The Moleman of Belmont Avenue	Danny	
2011	The Blisters: How Four Became Three	Dave's Dad	Short
2012	New Dad	Brad	Short
2012	Revenge for Jolly!	Dale	
2012	Adventures in the Sin Bin	Happy Foods Security Guard	
2012	Seeking a Friend for the End of the World	Radio Announcer (voice)	
2013	The Eulogist	Kyle	Short
2013	Dealin' with Idiots	Umpire #1	
2014	Real Estate Headshot Photographers	Arnie	Short
2014	Search Party	Cab Driver	
2016	Darby Forever	Announcer	Video short
2016	Sing	Baboon (voice)	
2017	Eddie's Life Coach	Garry Wishmann (voice)	Video short
2017	Handsome: A Netflix Mystery Movie	Detective Jerpis	Also producer
2017	Giant Conversations	Melvin	Short
2018	A Futile and Stupid Gesture	Peter Ivers	
2019	Men of Vision	Vernon	Short
2019	Bombshell	Factor EP	
2022	Unplugging	Ed	Also writer and producer

=== Television ===
Year	Title	Role	Notes
2008	Peep Show	Mark	TV movie
2011	The Back Room	Mikhail Prokhorov / Stevie Van Zandt	2 episodes
2011	Pretend Time	Father / Husband	2 episodes
2011	The League	Glovsie	Episode: "Yobogoya!"
2011	Family Practice	Matt Foote	TV movie
2011–2024	Curb Your Enthusiasm	Various	3 episodes
2012	Key & Peele	Tommy	Episode: "Dueling Magical Negroes"
2012	The Office	Glenn	2 episodes
2012	Mash Up		Unknown episodes
2013	Modern Family	Harlan	Episode: "Heart Broken"
2013	Arrested Development	Surveyor #2	Episode: "Double Crossers"
2013–2015	Cougar Town	Jerry	9 episodes; also writer and co-producer
2014–2017	Playing House	Bruce Caruso	15 episodes
2015	Salem Rogers	Ronald	TV movie
2015	The Shrink	Richard	Unknown episodes
2015	Veep	Paul	Episode: "Storms and Pancakes"
2015	WTF America	Ned	TV movie
2016	Teachers	Mr. Ross	Episode: "Hot Lunch"
2016	A Bronx Life	Banker	TV movie
2016	Rush Hour	Alex	2 episodes
2016	Bajillion Dollar Propertie$	Uri Lurie	Episode: "Snip Quit"; also writer, co-executive producer, and director
2016	Comedy Bang! Bang!	Movie Trailer Friend	Episode: "Kaley Cuoco Wears a Black Blazer and Slip on Sneakers"
2016	Virtually Mike and Nora	Dr. Garland	Episode: "Twins"
2016–2017	Dice	Brett	8 episodes
2017	Girls	Delvin P.	Episode: "Latching"
2017	Friends from College	Paul	2 episodes
2017–2020	F Is for Family	Tracy McGrath (voice)	5 episodes
2017–2018	Great News	Gene	16 episodes
2018	Barry	Producer	Episode: "Chapter Three: Make the Unsafe Choice"
2018	Life in Pieces	JP	Episode: "Sixteen Spanish Car Leak"
2018	Food: The Source of Life	Hipster Man	TV movie
2018–2019	The Good Place	Matt	3 episodes
2019	Bootstrapped	Businessman	Unknown episodes
2019–2021	Good Girls	Principal Clark	2 episodes
2019	Veronica Mars	Sul Ross	Episode: "Spring Break Forever"
2019	Search and Destroy	Mark	TV movie
2019–2021	A.P. Bio	Keith	7 episodes
2020–2023	Harley Quinn	Victor Zsasz / various (voice)	2 episodes
2020	The Second City Presents: The Last Show Left on Earth		2 episodes
2021	Ten Year Old Tom	Various voices	Episode: "Tom Urinates on Boston/First Responder"
2023	Single Drunk Female	Jim	3 episodes
2026	The Comeback	Rick	Episode: "Valerie Lights a Candle"
2026	The Bear	Allan Mitchell	2 episodes
2026	Life, Larry and the Pursuit of Unhappiness	Joseph Warren	Episode: "McCarthy"
