= Doree Shafrir =

American novelist

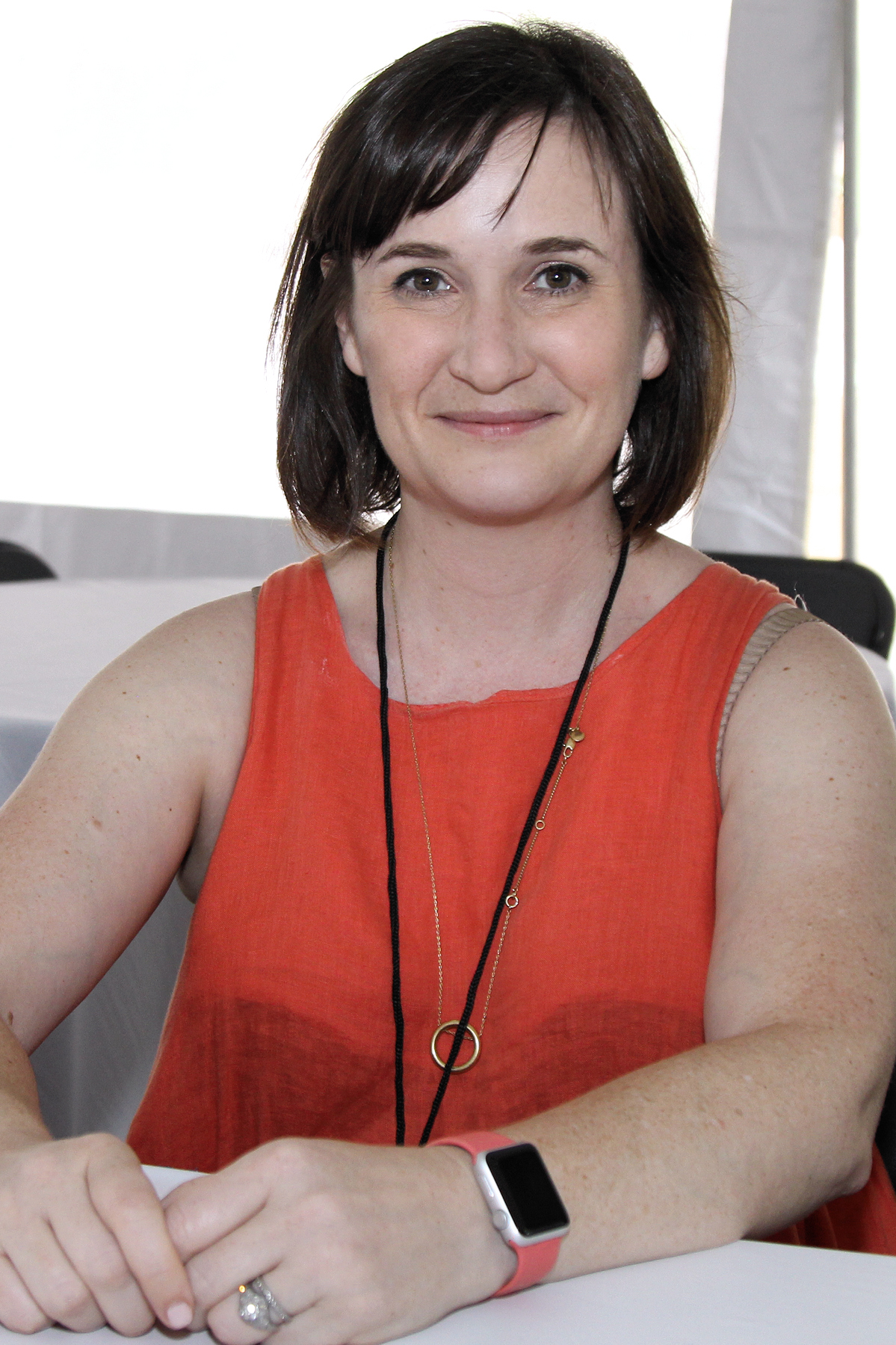
- Shafrir at the 2017 Texas Book Festival
- Occupations: Writer, editor
- Employer: BuzzFeed
- Known for: Forever35
- Notable work: Postcards from Yo Momma website; Love, Mom: Poignant, Goofy, Brilliant Messages from Home collection; STARTUP novel
- Spouse: Matt Mira (m. 2015)
- Children: 1

Doree Shafrir (born May 16, 1977) is an American author and podcast host. She was previously an editor at Rolling Stone, Gawker and The New York Observer and a senior writer at BuzzFeed. She is the author of the novel STARTUP and co-editor of the collection Love, Mom: Poignant, Goofy, Brilliant Messages from Home.

== Career ==
Shafrir departed a history Ph.D. program to begin her career in journalism at Philadelphia Weekly, then joining the staff of Gawker in its early years. She next worked for Rolling Stone before joining Buzzfeed in 2012 as an editor and culture writer.

Shafrir founded the Postcards From Yo Momma website with Jessica Grose, in 2008, where they posted reader-contributed electronic messages (texts, instant messages, and emails) from their mothers. She and Grose produced a book based on the site, titled Love, Mom: Poignant, Goofy, Brilliant Messages from Home, which was published by Hyperion in March 2009.

Shafrir has co-hosted the podcast Forever35, with Kate Spencer, since 2018. She is also the host of Matt and Doree's Eggcellent Adventure, alongside husband Matt Mira, focused on the couple's experience with infertility and having a child via IVF.

=== STARTUP ===
Shafrir's first novel, STARTUP, was published by Little, Brown on April 25, 2017. Reviewing the novel in The New York Times, Lara Vapnyar called the book "a biting and astute debut novel". In Rolling Stone, Helen Holmes notes Shafrir is "a seasoned veteran in the world people still refer to as 'new media'" and says Shafrir's extensive experience in the world she describes "helps give Startup its legs. Her measured eye and wealth of understanding is clear in the rendering of characters like Isabel, an assistant who casually leaves her phone on a coffee table when she goes to the bathroom because the notion of someone snatching it is unthinkable, and Victor, an out-of-work boyfriend convinced he's smarter and more important than his employed partner."

== Personal life ==
Shafrir lived in New York for nine years before moving to Los Angeles, where she lives with husband Matt Mira, a comedy writer and podcaster. In an interview with Nerdist Doree Shafrir and Mira described meeting through the Tinder dating app. She said she feared they set an unrealistic example, because they fell in love with the first person they met on the site.
