= Jessica St. Clair =

American actress and comedian

- Born: Princeton, New Jersey, U.S.
- Education: Middlebury College
- Occupations: Actress; comedian; writer; producer
- Years active: 2002–present
- Spouse: Dan O'Brien (m. 2006)
- Children: 1

Jessica St. Clair is an American actress and improvisational comedian from the Upright Citizens Brigade Theatre. With frequent collaborator Lennon Parham, she co-created and co-starred in NBC's Best Friends Forever and USA Network's Playing House. Recently she was a lead voice on the Adult Swim animated comedy Royal Crackers.

== Life and career ==
St. Clair was born in Princeton, New Jersey, and raised in Westfield, New Jersey, where she attended Westfield High School, graduating as part of the class of 1994. Her first major television work was as a regular panelist on the VH1 series Best Week Ever, offering comedic insights on pop culture and the news of the week. She co-starred in the short-lived ABC sitcom In the Motherhood in 2009.

St. Clair has gained notice for her frequent guest appearances (often alongside performing partner Lennon Parham) on podcasts such as Comedy Bang! Bang!, in which she plays the show's teenage intern Marissa Wompler. In 2015, St. Clair and Parham spun off their characters in a new Earwolf podcast called WOMP It Up!, with St. Clair as host Marissa Wompler and Parham co-hosting as Marissa's teacher Miss Listler. Frequent guests on the podcast include Brian Huskey as Marissa's stepdad Seth and Jason Mantzoukas as Marissa's former flame Eric "Gutterballs" Gutterman. The podcast ran through the summer of 2015, returning after a hiatus on November 16, 2015. Beginning in 2021, St. Clair and June Diane Raphael started their own podcast, The Deep Dive.

St. Clair and Parham created and starred in the NBC comedy series Best Friends Forever, which premiered on April 4, 2012, and aired for one season, followed by Playing House, which premiered on USA on April 29, 2014, and concluded its third and final season in July 2017.

St. Clair has played recurring roles on television shows such as Veep, Weeds, The McCarthys, Marry Me, American Housewife (as protagonist Katie's rival Chloe Brown Mueller), Worst Week and United States of Tara. She also played the role of Suzanne, the long-suffering wife of host Forrest MacNeil on the Comedy Central series Review. St. Clair's notable work in film includes supporting roles in Bridesmaids, She's Out of My League, Afternoon Delight and Enough Said.

St. Clair had a recurring role on the Netflix comedy series Space Force as structural engineer and civil contractor Kelly King. Beginning in 2023, she began voicing Deb Hornsby on the Adult Swim animated comedy Royal Crackers, currently in its second season.

In 2024, St. Clair and Casey Wilson teamed up to write and narrate the audiobook The Art of Small Talk, which includes interviews with Amy Poehler, Colin Quinn, Malcolm Gladwell, Tony Hale, and June Diane Raphael, among others.

== Personal life ==
St. Clair is married to playwright and poet Dan O'Brien. They have a daughter.

In 2015, St. Clair said that she and Lennon Parham had both learned Transcendental Meditation. In 2017, St. Clair revealed that she had undergone treatment for breast cancer after being diagnosed in September 2015, and this was incorporated into the third season of Playing House when her character Emma was similarly diagnosed.

== Filmography ==
Film
Year	Title	Role	Notes
2004	Terrorists	Jennifer Castle	
2006	For Your Consideration	Hula Balls Spokeswoman	
2007	Trendsetters	Julie Campbell	Short film
2008	College Road Trip	Ms. Prince	
2009	Stay Cool	Darcy Portola	
2009	The Condom Killer	Connor's Mother	Short film
2009	The Goods: Live Hard, Sell Hard.	Selleck Customer, Wife	
2009	Taking Chances	Reporter	
2009	It's Complicated	Wedding Specialist	
2010	She's Out of My League	Debbie	
2010	The Big Dog	Lena	Short film
2010	The Red Roof Inn Chronicles	Herself	Short film; also writer
2010	Life As We Know It	Beth	
2011	Bridesmaids	Whitney	
2012	Wanderlust	Deena Schuster	
2012	The Dictator	Denise	
2013	Afternoon Delight	Stephanie	
2013	Enough Said	Cynthia	
2015	Addicted to Fresno	Kristen	
2017	The House	Wall Street Guy - Reba	
2018	Dog Days	Ruth	
2020	Like a Boss	Kim	
2020	Superintelligence	Leslie	

Television
Year	Title	Role	Notes
2002	The Colin Quinn Show	Various	3 episodes
2003–2004	The Smoking Gun TV	Correspondent	Series regular
2004	Things I Hate About You	Juror	Episode: "Patrick and Renee"
2005	Lies and the Wives We Tell Them To		TV pilot
2007	The IT Crowd	Jen	unaired TV pilot
2007	Samantha Who?	Valerie	Episode: "The Wedding"
2007	UCB Comedy Originals		Episode: "Action 5 News!"; also producer
2008–2009	Worst Week	Sarah	6 episodes
2009	United States of Tara	Tiffany St. Claire	2 episodes
2009	In the Motherhood	Emily	Series regular
2009	Labor Pains	Pregnancy Class Instructor	TV movie
2009	Hank	Peggy	Episode: "Yard Sale"
2010	The Life & Times of Tim	Kelly / Friend (voice)	2 episodes
2010	Notes from the Underbelly	Violet	Episode: "Spinning Out of Control"
2010	Sons of Tucson	Marcia Teel	Episode: "Sally Teel"
2010	Weeds	Rebekkah	3 episodes
2011	Parks and Recreation	Denise Burkiss	Episode: "Road Trip"
2011	Curb Your Enthusiasm	Anna	Episode: "The Divorce"
2011	Love Bites	Chloe	3 episodes
2011	How to Be a Gentleman	Pam	Episode: "How to Attend Your Ex-Fiance's Wedding"
2012	Best Friends Forever	Jessica Black	Lead role (6 episodes); also co-creator, writer, executive producer
2013	The Office	Casey Dean	Episode: "A.A.R.M."
2013–2014	Veep	Dana	4 episodes
2014–2017	Review	Suzanne MacNeil	20 episodes
2014–2017	Playing House	Emma Crawford	Lead role (26 episodes); also co-creator, writer, director, executive producer
2014–2015	The McCarthys	Katrina	6 episodes
2014–2015	Marry Me	Julie	3 episodes
2015	Comedy Bang! Bang!	Miss Polite	Episode: "Mark Duplass Wears a Striped Sweater and Jeans"
2015	Key & Peele	Amy	Episode: "Killer Concept Album"
2015	Sofia the First	Athena (voice)	Episode: "The Secret Library"
2016–2017	Animals.	Kaitlin / Egg (voice)	2 episodes
2017–2019	American Housewife	Chloe Brown Mueller	12 episodes
2017	Portlandia	Squirrel (voice)	Episode: "Separation Anxiety"
2017	Teachers	June Harris	Episode: "Held Back"
2017	Angie Tribeca	Mrs. Claire Farnsworth	Episode: "Welcome Back, Blotter"
2017–2022	Bob's Burgers	Nancy / Joanne / Ms. Padaro (voice)	3 episodes
2017–2019	Bajillion Dollar Propertie$	Leatha Benet	3 episodes
2017	Tangled: The Series	Pizzazo (voice)	Episode: "Great Expotations"
2018	Grace and Frankie	Lauren	Episode: "The Death Stick"
2019	Ryan Hansen Solves Crimes on Television	Captain Lade'e	6 episodes
2019	Arrested Development	Anita Bramwell	2 episodes
2019–2022	American Dad!	Connie Robinson, Additional Characters (voice)	5 episodes
2019	Man with a Plan	Kelly	Episodes: "Clean Country Living", "The Intervention(s)"
2019	Bless This Mess	Stacey	Episode: "The Grisham Gals"
2020–2022	Avenue 5	Mia	Recurring role; 15 episodes
2020	Space Force	Kelly King	Recurring role; 5 episodes
2020	Close Enough	Joy (voice)	Episode: "First Date/Snailin' It"
2020	Central Park	Deb Dalyrumple (voice)	Episode: "A Fish Called Snakehead"
2020–2021	The Goldbergs	Dolores	Recurring, seasons 7–8
2023	How I Met Your Father	Megan	Episode: "The Reset Button"
2023	A Million Little Things	Amelia	Episode: "Think Twice"
2023	History of the World, Part II	Sarah	Episode: "III"
2023–present	Royal Crackers	Deb Hornsby (voice)	Lead role
2023–2024	Based on a True Story	Rochelle Lipinski	7 episodes
2024	Night Court	Heather	Recurring
2024	Loot	Host	Episode: "Women Who Rule"
2024	The Studio	Leigh	Episode: “The Pediatric Oncologist”
