= Anthony King (writer) =

American comedian and writer

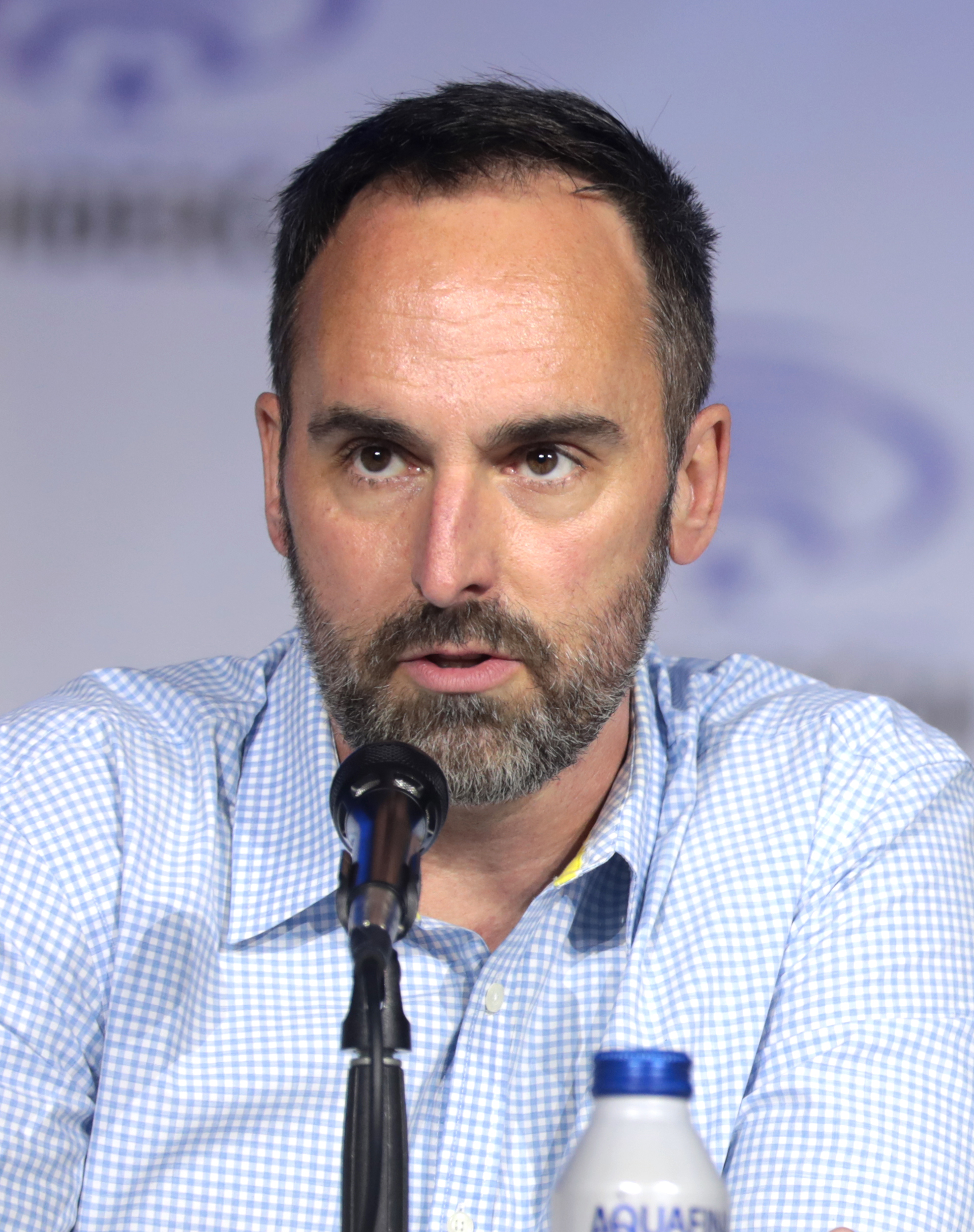
King at the 2022 WonderCon

Anthony King is an American writer, director, and comedian based in Los Angeles. He was previously the Artistic Director of the Upright Citizens Brigade Theatre in New York City. King attended the University of North Carolina in Chapel Hill, North Carolina.

King has written for television shows such as Playing House, Broad City, Silicon Valley, Wet Hot American Summer: First Day of Camp, and Search Party. He wrote the off-Broadway musical Gutenberg! The Musical! and the book for the Broadway musical Beetlejuice with Scott Brown, garnering a Tony Award for Best Book of a Musical nomination for the latter. He was nominated for an Emmy in 2011 for "Outstanding Writing For A Variety, Music Or Comedy Special" for Night Of Too Many Stars: An Overbooked Benefit For Autism Education which aired on Comedy Central.

King lives in Los Angeles with his wife, Kate Spencer, and their two children. The couple met in New York, where they were both involved with the Upright Citizens Brigade.
