= List of Drunk History episodes =

This is a list of episodes for the Comedy Central series Drunk History hosted by Derek Waters. A total of 70 episodes have aired over the course of 6 seasons.

== Series overview ==
Season	Episodes	Originally released	
Season	Episodes	First released	Last released
Web series	7	January 22, 2008	December 19, 2010
1	8	July 9, 2013	August 27, 2013
2	10	July 1, 2014	September 2, 2014
3	13	September 1, 2015	November 24, 2015
4	10	September 27, 2016	December 6, 2016
5	13	January 23, 2018	July 24, 2018
6	16	January 15, 2019	August 6, 2019
Specials	2	November 8, 2016	November 28, 2017

== Web series episodes (2007–10) ==
In addition to the below web series episodes, the concept also appears as segments during HBO's Funny or Die Presents series.

No.	Original release date
1	August 6, 2007
Retelling: Mark Gagliardi on Burr–Hamilton duel; Cast: Michael Cera as Alexander Hamilton; Jake Johnson as Aaron Burr; Ashley Johnson as Elizabeth Schuyler Hamilton; Derek Waters as Thomas Jefferson
2	November 2007
Retelling: Eric Falconer on Benjamin Franklin's kite experiment; Cast: Jack Black as Benjamin Franklin; Clark Duke as William Franklin; Jayma Mays as Annabelle; Derek Waters as Annabelle's husband
3	2008
Retelling: Jen Kirkman on Oney Judge's escape from the Washingtons; Cast: Danny McBride as George Washington; Marianna Palka as Martha Washington; Tymberlee Hill as Oney Judge; Jason Ritter as Head of Customs; Derek Waters as reporter
4	May 11, 2008
Retellings: J. D. Ryznar on William Henry Harrison's presidency and death; Cast: Paul Schneider as William Henry Harrison; Steve Agee as doctor; Ben Hoffman as doctor; Derek Waters
5	March 22, 2010
Retelling: Jen Kirkman on Abraham Lincoln and Frederick Douglass's friendship; Cast: Will Ferrell as Abraham Lincoln; Don Cheadle as Frederick Douglass; Zooey Deschanel as Mary Todd Lincoln
6	January 7, 2010
Retelling: Duncan Trussell on Nikola Tesla meeting and working for Thomas Edison; Cast: John C. Reilly as Nikola Tesla; Crispin Glover as Thomas Edison; Derek Waters as George Westinghouse
7	December 15, 2010
Retelling: Allan McLeod on "A Visit from St. Nicholas" (aka "Twas the Night Before Christmas"); Cast: Ryan Gosling as Narrator; Jim Carrey as St. Nicholas; Eva Mendes as Ma; AJ and Ellie Culp as children

== Television series episodes ==
=== Season 1 (2013) ===
No. overall	No. in season	Title	Original release date	Prod. code	US viewers (millions)
1	1	"Washington, D.C."	July 9, 2013	102	0.91
Retellings: Matt Gourley on the Watergate scandal Allan McLeod on the Assassination of Abraham Lincoln; Eric Edelstein on Elvis Presley meeting Richard Nixon; Cast: Jack Black as Elvis Presley; Nathan Fielder as Bob Woodward; Bob Odenkirk as Richard Nixon; Jack McBrayer as H. R. Haldeman; Adam Scott as John Wilkes Booth; Will Forte as Edwin Booth; Jonathan Ames as Junius Brutus Booth; Stephen Merchant as Abraham Lincoln; Dave Grohl as Memphis Mafia; Fred Willard as Deep Throat
2	2	"Chicago"	July 16, 2013	103	0.79
Retellings: Tommy Blacha on Al Capone; Rich Fulcher on Abraham Lincoln's past as a lawyer Kyle Kinane on the Haymarket affair Cast: Matt Besser as Edwin Stanton; Ike Barinholtz as August Spies; Eric Filipkowski as Abraham Lincoln; Charlie Finn as Captain John Bonfield; Moshe Kasher as Albert Parsons; Will Sasso as Frank Nitti; Joe Lo Truglio as Al Capone
3	3	"Atlanta"	July 23, 2013	104	0.79
Retellings: James Atkinson on Martin Luther King Jr. meeting with J. Edgar Hoover; Mark Gagliardi on Stetson Kennedy infiltrating the Ku Klux Klan; Jenny Slate on the invention of Coca-Cola; Cast: Bill Hader as John Pemberton; Rob Riggle as J. Edgar Hoover; Lamorne Morris as Martin Luther King Jr. Jason Ritter as Stetson Kennedy; Simon Helberg as Frank Mason Robinson; Matt Walsh as Slim; Kevin Nealon as The Grand Dragon
4	4	"Boston"	July 30, 2013	101	0.88
Retellings: Jen Kirkman on the life of Mary Dyer; Michael and Erin Rohr on the Isabella Stewart Gardner Museum theft Chris Romano on Boston's greatest arsonist, John "Johnny Cool" Shaheen; Cast: Michael Cera as John Endecott; Jason Ritter as Investigator; Tim Heidecker as Cop; Connie Britton as Patricia Shaheen; June Diane Raphael as Isabella Stewart Gardner; Nick Offerman as Johnny Cool; Winona Ryder as Mary Dyer; Bob Odenkirk as The Guy; Brett Gelman as Art Thief; Martin Starr as Art Thief; Chris Parnell as Charles II of England
5	5	"San Francisco"	August 6, 2013	105	0.80
Retellings: Artemis Pebdani on the life of Mary Ellen Pleasant; Derrick Beckles on the story of Mark Twain; Natasha Leggero on the kidnapping of Patty Hearst; Cast: Lisa Bonet as Mary Ellen Pleasant; Terry Crews as Donald DeFreeze; Steve Little as Mark Twain; Ben Hoffman as Newscaster; Kristen Wiig as Patty Hearst
6	6	"Detroit"	August 13, 2013	106	1.08
Retellings: Paget Brewster on the Kellogg Brothers; Tommy Blacha on Ralph Nader's feud with General Motors; Lucius Dillon on the rivalry of Harry Houdini and Arthur Conan Doyle; Cast: Luke Wilson as Will Keith Kellogg; Owen Wilson as John Harvey Kellogg; Jason Schwartzman as Ralph Nader; Ken Marino as Harry Houdini; Alfred Molina as Arthur Conan Doyle; Richard Riehle as James Roche
7	7	"Nashville"	August 20, 2013	108	1.00
Retellings: Seth Weitberg on the rise of Dolly Parton's solo career Alie Ward and Georgia Hardstark on the Lewis and Clark Expedition; B. J. Porter on the Scopes Trial; Cast: Tony Hale as Meriwether Lewis; Taran Killam as William Clark; Aubrey Plaza as Sacagawea; Kumail Nanjiani as Lakota Chief; Jack McBrayer as Clarence Darrow; Bradley Whitford as William Jennings Bryan; Rich Fulcher as Porter Wagoner; Casey Wilson as Dolly Parton
8	8	"The Wild West"	August 27, 2013	107	0.87
Retellings: Preston Flagg on Billy the Kid; Mark Gagliardi on the Rough Riders; Matt Gourley on Battle of the Alamo; Cast: Timm Sharp as Billy the Kid; Rob Huebel as Pat Garrett; Andy Daly as Theodore Roosevelt; Jake Johnson as William B. Travis; Chris Parnell as James Bowie; Horatio Sanz as Antonio López de Santa Anna

=== Season 2 (2014) ===
No. overall	No. in season	Title	Original release date	US viewers (millions)
9	1	"Montgomery"	July 1, 2014	N/A
Retellings: Allan McLeod on Percy Lavon Julian; Amber Ruffin on Claudette Colvin; Morgan Murphy on Joe Louis vs. Max Schmeling; Cast: Mariah Wilson as Claudette Colvin; Lisa Bonet as Rosa Parks; Jerry Minor as Fred Gray; Jordan Peele as Percy Lavon Julian; Terry Crews as Joe Louis; Tim Heidecker as Max Schmeling "Weird Al" Yankovic as Adolf Hitler
10	2	"New York City"	July 8, 2014	N/A
Retellings: Eric Falconer on the Statue of Liberty; Suzi Barrett on Sybil Ludington; JD Ryznar on Nellie Bly; Cast: Laura Dern as Nellie Bly; Paul Scheer as Henry Ludington; Juno Temple as Sybil Ludington; Michaela Watkins as Nurse; Taran Killam as Frédéric Auguste Bartholdi; Brett Gelman (Statue of Liberty) and Matt Walsh (Nellie Bly) as Joseph Pulitzer
11	3	"American Music"	July 15, 2014	N/A
Retellings: David Wain on Alan Freed and the birth of rock and roll Eric Edelstein on Kris Kristofferson; Colton Dunn on "Rapper's Delight"; Cast: Jack McBrayer as Alan Freed; Retta as Sylvia Robinson; Da'Vone McDonald as Big Bank Hank; Jaleel White as Grandmaster Caz; Ron Funches as DJ Kool Herc; Jon Daly as Kris Kristofferson; Johnny Knoxville as Johnny Cash
12	4	"Baltimore"	July 22, 2014	N/A
Retellings: Paget Brewster on Allan Pinkerton's Lincoln assignment Henry Phillips on the story of Francis Scott Key; Duncan Trussell on Edgar Allan Poe's feud with Rufus Wilmot Griswold; Cast: Martin Starr as Abraham Lincoln; Charlie Day as Allan Pinkerton; Preston Flagg as Harry W. Davies; Adrianne Palicki as Kate Warne; Jeff Ross as Francis Scott Key; James Adomian as Alexander Cochrane; Craig Anstett as Robert Ross; Jesse Plemons as Edgar Allan Poe; Jason Ritter as Rufus Wilmot Griswold
13	5	"Charleston"	July 29, 2014	N/A
Retellings: Seth Weitberg on Charles Sumner; Dave Ross on Julius Waties Waring; Mark Gagliardi on Robert Smalls; Cast: Busy Philipps as Elizabeth Waring; Rich Fulcher as Julius Waties Waring; Brandon T. Jackson as Robert Smalls; Brian Mganga as Young Robert Smalls; Johnny Knoxville as Preston Brooks; Patton Oswalt as Charles Sumner
14	6	"Hollywood"	August 5, 2014	N/A
Retellings: Steve Berg on the making of Citizen Kane; Derek Miller on the creation of Mickey Mouse; Drew Droege on Ronald Reagan; Cast: John Lithgow as William Randolph Hearst; Tony Hale as Ub Iwerks; Michael Angarano as Walt Disney; Lindsay Sloane as Nancy Reagan; Nick Kroll as Ronald Reagan; Jack Black as Orson Welles
15	7	"Hawaii"	August 12, 2014	N/A
Retellings: Jonah Ray on James Cook; Phil Hendrie on Daniel Inouye; Kurt Braunohler on Eddie Aikau; Cast: Steven Yeun as Daniel Inouye; James Hong as Hyotaro Inouye; Jason Mantzoukas as Eddie Aikau; Eugene Cordero as Kalaniʻōpuʻu; Ken Marino as James Cook
16	8	"Philadelphia"	August 19, 2014	N/A
Retellings: Nick Rutherford on Friedrich Wilhelm von Steuben; Patrick Walsh on the election of 1800; Erin McGathy on Benedict Arnold; Cast: Winona Ryder as Peggy Shippen; Chris Parnell as Benedict Arnold; Jerry O'Connell as Thomas Jefferson; Joe Lo Truglio as John Adams; Jayma Mays as Abigail Adams; David Cross as Friedrich Wilhelm von Steuben; John Lithgow (Benedict Arnold) and Stephen Merchant as George Washington
17	9	"Sports Heroes"	August 26, 2014	N/A
Retellings: Preston Flagg on Jim Thorpe; Karey Dornetto on Babe Didrikson Zaharias; Matt Jones on Jim Abbott; Cast: Emily Deschanel as Babe Didrikson Zaharias; Aidan Sussman as Young Jim Abbott; Zach Gilford as Jim Abbott; Jason Momoa as Jim Thorpe
18	10	"First Ladies"	September 2, 2014	N/A
Retellings: Molly McAleer on Frances Folsom Cleveland Preston; Jen Kirkman on Edith Wilson; Jenny Johnson on Dolley Madison; Cast: Alia Shawkat as Frances Folsom Cleveland Preston; Bobby Moynihan as Grover Cleveland; Paget Brewster as Emma Folsom; Casey Wilson as Dolley Madison; Ian Roberts as James Madison; Courteney Cox as Edith Wilson

This season features three episodes ("American Music", "First Ladies", and "Sports Heroes") that are structured around themes instead of the typical city-focused format.

=== Season 3 (2015) ===
On July 25, 2014, Comedy Central announced that Drunk History was renewed for a third season. The third season premiered on September 1, 2015. This season, episodes featured locations like Miami, Las Vegas, Roswell, and New Orleans.

No. overall	No. in season	Title	Original release date	Prod. code	US viewers (millions)
19	1	"New Jersey"	September 1, 2015	TBA	0.590
Retellings: Tess Lynch on the Union Army Balloon Corps; Mark Proksch on the Bone Wars; Jenny Slate on the discovery of cosmic microwave background Cast: Tony Hale as Edward Drinker Cope; Christopher Meloni as Othniel Charles Marsh; Jason Ritter as Robert Woodrow Wilson; Justin Long as Arno Allan Penzias; Greg Kinnear as Thaddeus S. C. Lowe; Stephen Merchant as Abraham Lincoln
20	2	"Miami"	September 8, 2015	TBA	0.611
Retellings: Greg Worswick on Clark Gable; Jessica Meraz on Juan Ponce de León; Dan Harmon on Griselda Blanco Cast: Josh Hartnett as Clark Gable; Johnny Knoxville as Juan Ponce de León; Joe Lo Truglio as Bob Palombo; David Koechner as Diego Columbus; Horatio Sanz as Alberto Bravo; Matt Besser as Ferdinand II of Aragon; Maya Rudolph as Griselda Blanco
21	3	"New Orleans"	September 15, 2015	TBA	N/A
Retellings: Allan McLeod on Jean Lafitte; Gloria Calderon Kellett on Sam Zemurray; Daryl Johnson on Louis Armstrong Cast: Thomas Middleditch as Sam Zemurray; Craig Anstett as Lee Christmas; Ben Covette as Guy Molony; Rudy Mancuso as Manuel Bonilla; Jason Momoa as Jean Lafitte; Jack McBrayer as Andrew Jackson; Andre Royo as King Oliver; Maestro Harrell as Louis Armstrong; Miles Brown as Young Louis Armstrong
22	4	"Spies"	September 22, 2015	TBA	N/A
Retellings: Crissle West on Harriet Tubman; Claudia O'Doherty on Virginia Hall; Lucius Dillon on Roald Dahl Cast: Octavia Spencer as Harriet Tubman; Alia Shawkat as Virginia Hall; Will Ferrell as Roald Dahl; Matt Gourley as Ian Fleming
23	5	"Cleveland"	September 29, 2015	TBA	N/A
Retellings: John Levenstein on Wayne Wheeler; David Wain on Dorothy Fuldheim; Ashley Barnhill on The Cleveland Summit Cast: Samm Levine as Wayne Wheeler; Mary Elizabeth Ellis as Dorothy Fuldheim; Sam Richardson as Jim Brown; Ron Funches as Herbert Muhammad; Aidan Sussman as Young Wayne Wheeler; George Wallace as Bill Russell; Lauren Sivan as Barbara Walters; Echo Kellum as Kareem Abdul-Jabbar; Gaius Charles as Muhammad Ali
24	6	"Games"	October 6, 2015	TBA	N/A
Retellings: Lauren Lapkus on Milton Bradley; Craig Anstett on pinball prohibition Rich Fulcher on the 1972 World Chess Championship Cast: Topher Grace as Milton Bradley; Zach Gilford as Roger Sharpe; Taran Killam as Bobby Fischer; Jake Johnson as Boris Spassky; Jeremy Konner as Henry Kissinger
25	7	"Oklahoma"	October 13, 2015	TBA	N/A
Retellings: Emily Wilson on Nannita Daisey; Laura Steinel on Gordon Cooper; Mark Gagliardi on Bass Reeves Cast: Kat Dennings as Nannita Daisey; Colin Hanks as Gordon Cooper; Jaleel White as Bass Reeves
26	8	"Journalism"	October 20, 2015	TBA	N/A
Retellings: Jen Kirkman on Thomas Nast and William M. Tweed; Drew Droege on the newsboys' strike of 1899; Cameron Esposito on Nellie Bly and Elizabeth Bisland's race around the world Cast: Jason Alexander as William M. Tweed; Noah Wyle as Thomas Nast; Michael Cera as Morris Cohen; Haley Joel Osment as Kid Blink; Ellie Kemper as Nellie Bly; Natasha Leggero as Elizabeth Bisland
27	9	"Los Angeles"	October 27, 2015	TBA	N/A
Retellings: Seth Weitberg on the creation of the Los Angeles Police Department; Eric Edelstein on Rin Tin Tin; Jeremy Konner on the Los Angeles Aqueduct Cast: Giancarlo Esposito as Andrés Pico; Ryan Phillippe as Benjamin Ignatius Hayes; Jack Black as William Mulholland; Kyle Gass as Frederick Eaton; Zach Woods as Lee Duncan; Rowdy as Rin Tin Tin
28	10	"New Mexico"	November 3, 2015	TBA	N/A
Retellings: Fortune Feimster on Popé and the Pueblo Revolt; Mike Still on Ernest Thompson Seton; Steve Berg on the Roswell UFO crash of 1947 Cast: Rob Huebel as Juan Francisco Treviño; Jason Mantzoukas as Popé; Colin Hanks as Ernest Thompson Seton; Thomas Lennon as Jesse Marcel; John Ennis as Stanton T. Friedman; Patton Oswalt as Mac Brazel
29	11	"Inventors"	November 10, 2015	TBA	N/A
Retellings: JD Ryznar on the telephone Paget Brewster on the bra Duncan Trussell on Thomas Edison Cast: Parker Posey as Caresse Crosby; Martin Starr as Alexander Graham Bell; Jason Ritter as Elisha Gray; Craig Anstett as Bell's Lawyer; Michael McKean as Carl Laemmle; Chris Parnell as Thomas Edison; A. C. Newman as Cameraman; Drew Pinsky as Judge; Henry Winkler as Zenas Fisk Wilber
30	12	"Las Vegas"	November 17, 2015	TBA	N/A
Retellings: Chris Romano on James T. McWilliams; Brendon Walsh on Bugsy Siegel; Paul F. Tompkins on the Moulin Rouge Hotel Cast: Sam Rockwell as Bugsy Siegel; Donald Faison as Joe Louis; Timm Sharp as James T. McWilliams; Ben Schwartz as Meyer Lansky; Da'Vone McDonald as James B. McMillan; Rich Fulcher as William A. Clark; Dennis Quaid as Lucky Luciano
31	13	"Space"	November 24, 2015	TBA	N/A
Retellings: Holly Laurent on Carl Sagan and Ann Druyan; Matt Gourley on Wernher von Braun; Kyle Kinane on the first space walk Cast: Blake Anderson as Alexei Leonov; Adam DeVine as Pavel Belyayev; Chelsea Peretti as Ann Druyan; Paul Scheer as Carl Sagan; Nathan Fillion as Wernher von Braun; Mark Gagliardi as John F. Kennedy

=== Season 4 (2016) ===
No. overall	No. in season	Title	Original release date	Prod. code	US viewers (millions)
32	1	"Great Escapes"	September 27, 2016	401	N/A
Retellings: Duncan Trussell on Timothy Leary; Steve Berg on Devil's Island; Doug Jones on Charles Joughin Cast: Thomas Lennon as Timothy Leary; Thomas Middleditch as William Willis; Ron Funches as Jules; Chris Parnell as Charles Joughin
33	2	"Legends"	October 4, 2016	404	N/A
Retellings: Nick Rutherford on Sam Patch; Tymberlee Hill on Ella Fitzgerald and Marilyn Monroe; Patrick Walsh on Buster Keaton Cast: Kyle Mooney as Sam Patch; Gabourey Sidibe as Ella Fitzgerald; Juno Temple as Marilyn Monroe; Billie Joe Armstrong as Charlie Chaplin; Tony Hale as Buster Keaton
34	3	"Bar Fights"	October 11, 2016	403	0.59
Retellings: Amber Ruffin on The Saloon Smasher; Kyle Kinane on Andrew Jackson; Crissle West on the Stonewall riots Cast: Vanessa Bayer as Carrie Nation; Mariah Wilson as Nation Fangirl; Dwight Yoakam as Jesse Benton; Michael Cera as Andrew Jackson; Brendan Sexton III as Thomas Benton; Alexandra Grey as Marsha P. Johnson; Trace Lysette as Sylvia Rivera
35	4	"The Roosevelts"	October 18, 2016	402	N/A
Retellings: Katie Nolan on Theodore Roosevelt and football Eric Edelstein on Franklin D. Roosevelt and Winston Churchill; Paget Brewster on Eleanor Roosevelt and the Communist sniper Cast: Rob Riggle as Theodore Roosevelt; Rich Fulcher as Franklin D. Roosevelt; Louie Anderson as Winston Churchill; Busy Philipps as Eleanor Roosevelt; Mae Whitman as Lyudmila Pavlichenko
36	5	"Scoundrels"	October 25, 2016	TBA	N/A
Retellings: Chris Romano on William McMasters; Hillary Anne Matthews on Sadie Farrell; Rich Fulcher on Lord Gordon Gordon Cast: Ed Helms as William McMasters; Jesse Plemons as Charles Ponzi; Kat Dennings as Sadie Farrell; Ronda Rousey as Gallus Mag; Taran Killam as Lord Gordon Gordon; Josh Charles as Jay Gould
37	6	"Siblings"	October 31, 2016	TBA	N/A
Retellings: Lauren Lapkus on the Wright brothers and Katharine Wright; Mike Still on the Kopp sisters JD Ryznar on the Fox sisters Cast: Jason Ritter as Orville Wright; Jenna Fischer as Katharine Wright; Rachel Bilson as Constance Kopp; Elizabeth Olsen as Norma Kopp; Sarah Ramos as Maggie Fox; Sugar Lyn Beard as Catharine Fox
38	7	"Landmarks"	November 15, 2016	TBA	N/A
Retellings: Daryl Johnson on the Brooklyn Bridge; Jenny Johnson on Victor Lustig; Mark Gagliardi on William Shakespeare and the theatre heist of 1598 Cast: John Ennis as John A. Roebling; Taylor Schilling as Emily Warren Roebling; Andrew Rannells as Washington Roebling; Liev Schreiber as Victor Lustig; Kevin Farley as Al Capone; John Cho as William Shakespeare; Anthony Edwards as Giles Allen
39	8	"Food"	November 22, 2016	TBA	N/A
Retellings: Tess Lynch on the Artichoke Wars; Lyric Lewis on Julia Child; Lucius Dillon on the Great Molasses Flood Cast: Kevin Pollak as Ciro Terranova; Michael McKean as Arthur Jell; Joe Lo Truglio as Paul Cushing Child; Jason Ritter as John Barry; Samm Levine as Fiorello H. La Guardia; Michaela Watkins as Julia Child
40	9	"Hamilton"	November 29, 2016	TBA	N/A
Retellings: Lin-Manuel Miranda on Alexander Hamilton Cast: Alia Shawkat as Alexander Hamilton; Aubrey Plaza as Aaron Burr; Bokeem Woodbine as George Washington; Tony Hale as James Monroe; Dave Grohl as Hamilton Opponent; David Wain as Thomas Jefferson Special appearances by: Questlove and Chris Jackson
41	10	"Shit Shows"	December 6, 2016	TBA	N/A
Retellings: Jenny Slate on the Cherry Sisters; Allan McLeod on the Astor Place Riot; Bob Odenkirk on Disco Demolition Night Cast: Allison Tolman as Jessie Cherry; Jessie Ennis as Ella Cherry; Mary Lynn Rajskub as Effie Cherry; Ashley Johnson as Elizabeth Cherry; Andrea Savage as Addie Cherry; Ben Folds as Nathan Cherry; Jack McBrayer as William Macready; David Koechner as Edwin Forrest; Charlie Finn as Mike Veeck; Patton Oswalt as Explosives Expert; Colin Hanks as Steve Dahl

=== Season 5 (2018) ===
No. overall	No. in season	Title	Original release date	Prod. code	US viewers (millions)
42	1	"Heroines"	January 23, 2018	TBA	0.433
Retellings: Paget Brewster on Deborah Sampson; Tiffany Haddish on Rose Valland; Amber Ruffin on Clara Barton Cast: Evan Rachel Wood as Deborah Sampson; Busy Philipps as Rose Valland; Alexander Skarsgård as James Dunn; Jack McBrayer as Abraham Lincoln; Mandy Moore as Clara Barton
43	2	"Dangerous Minds"	January 30, 2018	TBA	0.430
Retellings: Chris Romano on Rasputin; Doug Jones on W. C. Minor; Duncan Trussell on Jack Parsons Cast: Taran Killam as Jack Parsons; Jerry O'Connell as Rasputin; Kevin Farley as James Murray; Brendan Sexton III as Felix; Ashley Johnson as Sara Northrup; Eric Edelstein as L. Ron Hubbard; Bob Odenkirk as W. C. Minor
44	3	"Game Changers"	February 6, 2018	TBA	0.470
Retellings: Questlove on The Birth of Hip Hop; Carl Tart on Berry Gordy; Ashley Nicole Black on Nichelle Nichols Cast: Miles Brown as Grand Wizzard Theodore; Raven-Symoné as Nichelle Nichols; Method Man as Grandmaster Flash; Tymberlee Hill as Diana Ross; O'Shea Jackson Jr. as DJ Kool Herc; Brian Tyree Henry as Berry Gordy; Eris Baker as Cindy Campbell; Jaleel White as Martin Luther King Jr.
45	4	"Sex"	February 13, 2018	TBA	0.428
Retellings: Alison Rich on the birth of birth control Gabe Liedman on The Kinseys; Katie Nolan on Gloria Steinem Cast: Amber Tamblyn as Margaret Sanger; Jason Mantzoukas as Gregory Pincus; Hillary Anne Matthews as Katherine McCormick; Josh Charles as Alfred Kinsey; Jillian Bell as Clara Kinsey; Jane Krakowski as Sheralee; Abbi Jacobson as Gloria Steinem
46	5	"Civil Rights"	February 20, 2018	TBA	0.371
Retellings: Kirby Howell-Baptiste on Suffrajitsu; Crissle West on The Birmingham Children's March; Suzi Barrett on the 504 Sit-in Cast: Tatiana Maslany as Emmeline Pankhurst; Kat Dennings as Gertrude Harding; Sheaun McKinney as Martin Luther King Jr. Zach Anner; Sean Berdy as Frank Bowe; Ajani A.J. Murray; Lauren Potter as Ventilator Woman; Ali Stroker as Judy Heumann; Rob Corddry as Joseph Califano; Eris Baker as Gwendolyn Sanders
47	6	"Underdogs"	February 27, 2018	TBA	0.430
Retellings: Solomon Georgio on Mr. Rogers; Jon Gabrus on Ida Tarbell; Jennie Pierson on Maya Lin Cast: Colin Hanks as Fred Rogers; David Koechner as John Pastore; Shannon Woodward as Ida Tarbell; John Ennis as John D. Rockefeller; David Harbour as Vietnam Memorial Head; Kimiko Glenn as Maya Lin
48	7	"Drunk Mystery"	March 6, 2018	TBA	0.430
Retellings: Alison Rich on Agatha Christie; Kyle Mooney on D.B. Cooper; Georgia Hardstark on The Circleville Letters Cast: Kirsten Dunst as Agatha Christie; Jesse Plemons as William Kenward; Jayma Mays as Florence Schaffner; Richard Riehle as Ralph Himmelsbach; Taran Killam as D.B. Cooper; Vanessa Bayer as Mary Gillespie
49	8	"World War II"	June 19, 2018	TBA	0.440
Retellings: John Lutz on Ghost Army; Randall Park on Frank S. Emi; Lyric Lewis on Willie Hitler Cast: Steve Agee as Harry Reeder; Kyle Bornheimer as Soldier; Jack McBrayer as Merrick Truly; Aaron Takahashi as Frank S. Emi; Grant Imahara as Frank Inouye; Thomas Mann as Little Baby Hitler
50	9	"Heists"	June 26, 2018	TBA	0.446
Retellings: Mark Gagliardi on the theft of the Mona Lisa; Brendon Walsh on the Santa Claus Bank Robbery; Rachel Bloom on Adolf Eichmann Cast: Johnny Knoxville as Marshall Ratliff; Tony Hale as Isser Harel; Alex Karpovsky as Zvi Aharoni; Jack Black as Vincenzo Peruggia "Weird Al" Yankovic as Adolf Eichmann
51	10	"Animals"	July 3, 2018	TBA	0.493
Retellings: Claudia O'Doherty on the Trial of the Rats; Mae Whitman on the Founding of the ASPCA; Rich Fulcher on Clever Hans Cast: Paul Scheer as Oskar Pfungst; John Michael Higgins as Wilhelm von Osten; Jack McBrayer as Barthélemy de Chasseneuz; Martin Starr as Bishop; Samm Levine as Henry Bergh; Casino as Clever Hans
52	11	"The Middle Ages"	July 10, 2018	TBA	0.499
Retellings: Hillary Anne Matthews on Joan of Arc; Shaun Diston on Temujin; Daryl Johnson on Mansa Musa Cast: Vanessa Hudgens as Joan of Arc; Jack McBrayer as Charles of Valois; Jimmy O. Yang as Temujin; Randall Park as Jamukha; Donald Faison as Mansa Musa
53	12	"Death"	July 17, 2018	TBA	0.419
Retellings: Steve Berg on General Meigs; Jimmy O. Yang on The Kidnapping of Lincoln's Body; JD Ryznar on The Bandit Who Wouldn't Give Up Cast: Jason Ritter as Montgomery C. Meigs; Sheaun McKinney as Lewis Swegles; Keir O'Donnell as Mullen; Steve Berg; Angus Sampson as Hughes; Justin Long as Elmer McCurdy
54	13	"Halloween"	July 24, 2018	TBA	0.398
Retellings: Allan McLeod on the Curse of Giles Corey; Tess Lynch on Elizabeth Krebs; Greg Tuculescu on Vlad the Impaler Cast: Allison Tolman as Elizabeth Krebs; Joel McHale as George Corwin/Robert Ellis Cahill; Jorma Taccone as Mehmed the Conqueror; Rich Fulcher as Giles Corey; Seth Rogen as Vlad the Impaler

=== Season 6 (2019) ===
No. overall	No. in season	Title	Original release date	Prod. code	US viewers (millions)
55	1	"Are You Afraid of the Drunk?"	January 15, 2019	TBA	N/A
Retellings: In a parody of Are You Afraid of the Dark?, Rich Fulcher narrates how Mary Shelley created the Frankenstein story. (Kirby Howell-Baptiste joined Waters for this retelling) Cast: Seth Rogen as Victor Frankenstein; Elijah Wood as Percy Shelley; Maria Blasucci as Claire Clairmont; Bennie Arthur as John Polidori; Jack McBrayer as Lord Byron; Will Ferrell as Frankenstein's Monster; Evan Rachel Wood as Mary Shelley
56	2	"National Parks"	January 22, 2019	TBA	N/A
Retellings: Steve Berg on the foundation of the National Park Service; Daryl Johnson on the Occupation of Alcatraz (segment guest-hosted by Eric Edelstein); Tess Lynch on Marjory Stoneman Douglas Cast: Q'orianka Kilcher as LaNada Means; Thomas Middleditch as John Muir; Adam Beach as Richard Oakes; David Koechner as Theodore Roosevelt; Dallas Goldtooth as John Trudell; Zahn McClarnon as Adam Fortunate Eagle; Jayma Mays as Marjory Stoneman Douglas
57	3	"Baseball"	January 29, 2019	TBA	N/A
Retellings: Katie Nolan on the Black Sox Scandal; Carl Tart on Moses Fleetwood Walker (segment guest-hosted by Jon Gabrus); Anais Fairweather on the basis for the film A League of Their Own Cast: Jake Johnson as Chick Gandil; Steve Berg as Eddie Cicotte; Eric Edelstein as Shoeless Joe Jackson; Gaius Charles as Moses Fleetwood Walker; Megan Cavanagh as Penny Marshall; Steven Weber as Philip K. Wrigley; Vanessa Hudgens as Marge Callaghan; Rachel Bilson as Helen Callaghan
58	4	"Trailblazers"	February 5, 2019	TBA	N/A
Retellings: Lyric Lewis on Bessie Coleman; Amber Ruffin on the Little Rock Nine Cast: Samira Wiley as Bessie Coleman; DeRon Horton as Ernest Green; Daryl J. Johnson; Zora Bikangaga; Amandla Stenberg as Elizabeth Eckford
59	5	"Love"	February 12, 2019	TBA	N/A
Retellings: Anais Fairweather on Tunnel 57; Drew Droege on the basis for the film Dog Day Afternoon; Alison Rich on Edith Windsor (segment guest-hosted by Kirby Howell-Baptiste) Cast: Josh Hartnett as Joachim Neumann; Missi Pyle as Christa Gruhle; Paul Rust as John Wojtowicz; Trace Lysette as Elizabeth Eden; Sugar Lyn Beard as Edie Windsor; Alison Brie as Thea Spyer
60	6	"Drugs"	February 20, 2019	TBA	N/A
Retellings: Duncan Trussell on John C. Lilly (segment guest-hosted by Dr. Drew Pinsky); Jon Lovett on JFK & Dr. Feelgood Cast: Shiri Appleby as Margaret Howe Lovatt; Brian Huskey as Max Jacobson; Greg Tuculescu as John F. Kennedy; Jay Duplass as John C. Lilly; Chris Parnell as Carl Sagan
61	7	"Femme Fatales"	February 26, 2019	TBA	N/A
Retellings: Sugar Lyn Beard on Mata Hari; Mae Whitman and Jane Levy on Murderess Row Cast: Minka Kelly as Maurine Dallas Watkins; Rick Overton; Malin Akerman as Beulah Annan; Lake Bell as Belva Gaertner; Dermot Mulroney as Georges Ladoux; Vanessa Hudgens as Mata Hari
62	8	"Drunk Mystery, Pt. 2"	March 5, 2019	TBA	N/A
Retellings: JD Ryznar on The Skidmore Bully; Lucius Dillon on the murder of Thomas Ince; Ryan Gaul on the death of James Callender (segment guest-hosted by Taran Killam) Cast: Jerry O'Connell as Ken McElroy; Thomas Lennon as William Randolph Hearst; Ellie Culp; A.J Culp; Justin Bartha as Thomas H. Ince; Craig Anstett as Thomas Jefferson; Anais Fairweather as Elinor Ince; Jack McBrayer as himself Erin Henriques as Marion Davies; Bobby Moynihan as James T. Callender
63	9	"Derek Waters' Believe It Or Not"	June 18, 2019	TBA	N/A
Retellings: Doug Jones on the Lawnchair Larry flight Allan McLeod on Phineas Gage; Jennie Pierson on the Greenbrier Ghost Cast: Taran Killam as John Alfred Preston; Sara Rue as Mary Jane Heaster; Steve Agee as Phineas Gage; Jackie Johnson as Sara; Colin Hanks as Lawnchair Larry
64	10	"Legacies"	June 25, 2019	TBA	N/A
Retellings: Preston Flagg on Lead Belly and Lomax; Suzi Barrett on Lennon & Ono's deportation case Brian Tyree Henry on Sam Cooke and "A Change is Gonna Come" Cast: Tony Hale as Leon Wildes; Steven Weber as John Lomax; Calvin Dutton as Sam Cooke; Camille Chen as Yoko Ono; Greg Tuculescu as John Lennon; Lilan Bowden as Elisa Boyer; Amber Ruffin as Barbara Cooke; J.T. Palmer as Lead Belly, Barack Obama and J.W. Alexander
65	11	"Fame"	July 2, 2019	TBA	N/A
Retellings: Hillary Anne Matthews on Hedy Lamarr; Nicole Byer on Eartha Kitt vs. Lady Bird Johnson (segment guest-hosted by Alison Rich); Mano Agapian on Masterpiece the Dog Cast: Frankie Shaw as Hedy Lamarr; Cheryl Hines as Lady Bird Johnson; Craig Anstett as Lyndon Johnson; Ken Marino as Masterpiece; Dave Foley as Alexis Pulaski; Ali Ghandour as Prince Aly Khan; Tessa Thompson as Eartha Kitt
66	12	"Good Samaritans"	July 9, 2019	TBA	N/A
Retellings: John Lutz on Ed Pulaski (segment guest-hosted by Amber Ruffin); Anais Fairweather on Ted Patrick Cast: Zach Gilford as Ed Pulaski; Justin Long as Randy; Kiele Sanchez as Emma Pulaski; Angela Trimbur; Niles Fitch as Michael Patrick; Gary Anthony Williams as Ted Patrick
67	13	"Whistleblowers"	July 16, 2019	TBA	N/A
Retellings: John Early on Martha Mitchell; Duncan Trussell on The Citizens' Commission to Investigate the FBI Cast: Tony Hale as John N. Mitchell; Sophia Bush as Bonnie Raines; Elijah Wood as John C. Raines; Craig Anstett as President Nixon; Vanessa Bayer as Martha Mitchell
68	14	"Behind Enemy Lines"	July 23, 2019	TBA	N/A
Retellings: Jessica McKenna on Night Witches; Jon Gabrus on Andrews' Raiders Cast: Emily Deschanel as Marina Raskova; Paget Brewster as Raisa Surnachevskaya; Martin Starr as William Allen Fuller; John Francis Daley as James J. Andrews
69	15	"S.O.S."	July 30, 2019	TBA	N/A
Retellings: Mark Gagliardi on Doug Hegdahl; Paget Brewster on Florence Nightingale Cast: Josh Charles as Doug Hegdahl; Lauren Sivan as Queen Victoria; Aaron Takahashi; Dante Basco as The Rabbit; Minka Kelly as Florence Nightingale
70	16	"Bad Blood"	August 6, 2019	TBA	N/A
Retellings: Jackie Johnson on Typhoid Mary; Lyric Lewis on Arsinoe Cast: Betsy Sodaro as Mary Mallon; Adam Campbell as George Soper; Aubrey Plaza as Cleopatra; David Wain as Julius Caesar; Justice Smith as Ptolemy; Olivia Trujillo as Arsinoe

=== YouTube shorts (2026) ===
No. overall	No. in season	Title	Original release date	Prod. code	US viewers (millions)
71	1	"Madonna Breaks Out at the VMAs"	September 15, 2026	TBA	N/A
Retelling: Marisha Ray on Madonna's performance at the first MTV Video Music Awards Cast: Meghan Trainor as Madonna
72	2	"FDR's Labor Secretary Frances Perkins"	September 30, 2026	TBA	TBD
Retelling: Lisa Gilroy on Franklin Roosevelt's New Deal Cast: Mae Whitman as Frances Perkins; Chris Parnell as FDR
73	3	"Biggest Ball of Twine"	October 5, 2026	TBA	TBD
Retelling: Patton Oswalt on the Biggest Ball of Twine civil war Cast: Colin Hanks; Seth Green; Steve Agee "Weird Al" Yankovic as the Ball of Twine

== Specials ==
No. overall	No. in season	Title	Original release date	Prod. code	US viewers (millions)
1	1	"Election Special"	November 8, 2016	TBA	N/A
In the style of Saturday Night Live, Derek Waters and Steve Berg host an election-themed clip show showcasing the best retellings of Presidential history, including Patrick Walsh on the election of 1800, Rich Fulcher on Abraham Lincoln's past as a lawyer, and Jen Kirkman on Edith Wilson.
2	2	"Drunk History Christmas Special"	November 28, 2017	TBA	N/A
Retellings: Craig Anstett on George Washington's crossing of the Delaware River; Phil Hendrie on Charles Dickens and the creation of A Christmas Carol; Rich Fulcher on Theodore Roosevelt's ban on Christmas trees; Cast: Ken Marino as Theodore Roosevelt; Rob Corddry as George Washington; Cole Sand as Archie Roosevelt; Noah Ziggy James as Quentin Roosevelt; Chris Witaske as Alexander Hamilton; Colin Hanks as Charles Dickens
