= Der Begriff des Instinktes einst und jetzt =

Book by Heinrich Ernst Ziegler

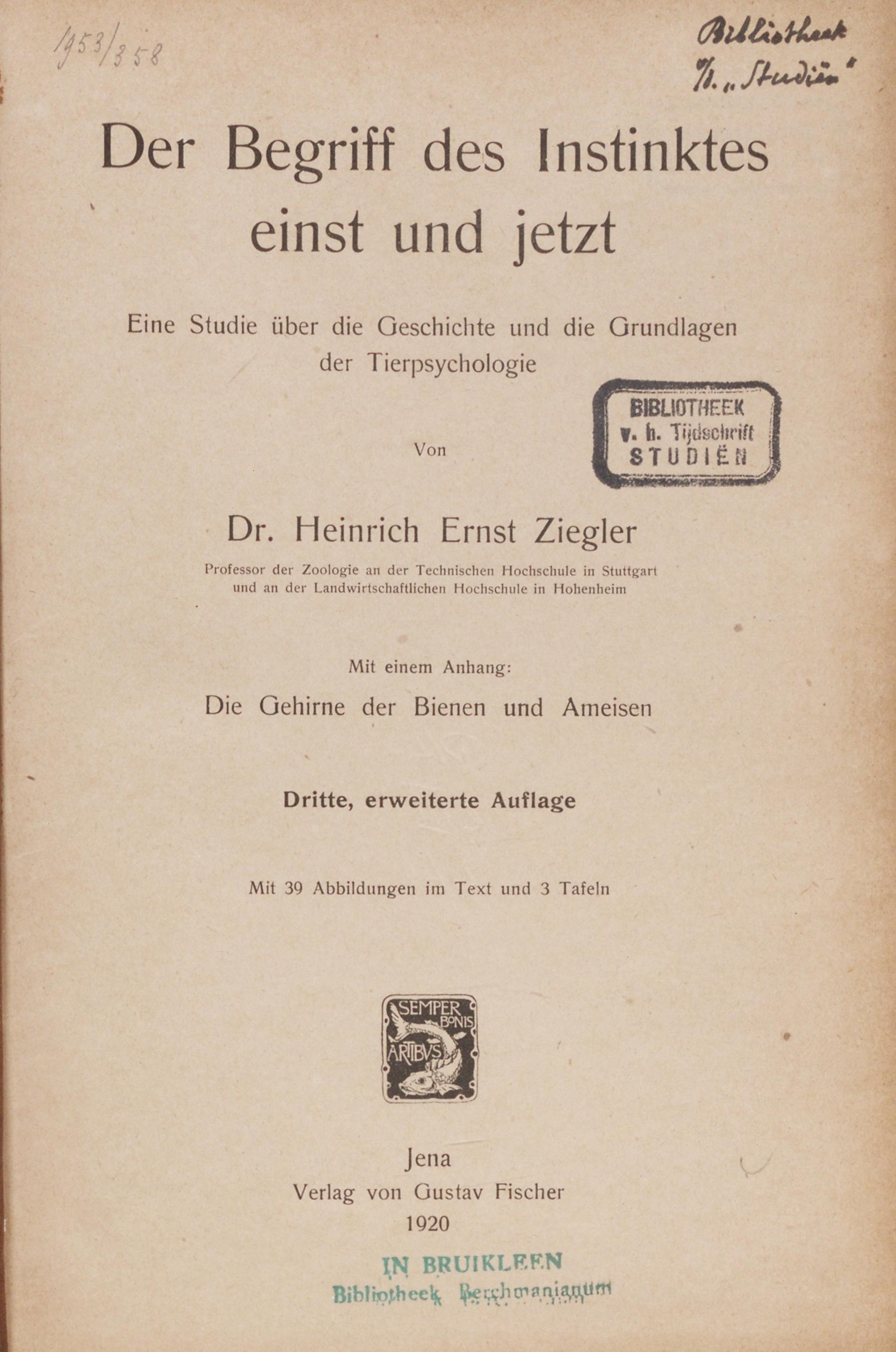
- Author: Heinrich Ernst Ziegler
- Subject: Zoology

Der Begriff des Instinktes einst und jetzt (English: The concept of instinct in past and present times) is a book written by Heinrich Ernst Ziegler. Its first edition was published in the Zoologische Jahrbücher, Supplement VII (English: Zoological yearbooks) in 1904. The second edition, published 1910 by Gustav Fisher in Jena and third edition, published in 1920 under the same publisher both received several extensions. The book is about the history of the concept instinct and the different conceptions of the animal psyche throughout history, as well as the understanding of these concepts at the time the book was published. Furthermore, it discusses the implications of Charles Darwin's theory of common descent for comparative psychology.

== Context ==
The author, Heinrich Ernst Ziegler has been a student of August Weismann in Freiburg, where he received his doctorate in 1882. Weismann is known for his germ plasm theory which posits that germ cells are not affected by changes of somatic cells during ones lifetime, implying that traits organisms acquire during their lifetimes are not inherited. This was in contrast to the, at that time still debated, Lamarckist conception that acquired traits can be inherited. Moreover, Weismann's theory also implied that since inherited traits are relatively stable, humans inherit a relatively stable human nature based on their instincts. Ziegler shared this view of instinct and adopted Herbert Spencer's conception that instincts are inherited traits of the nervous system.

In 1906, the German zoologist Ernst Haeckel initiated the German Monist Federation of which Ziegler was a founding member. Its purpose was to base ethics on a monistic, scientific worldview. Several scientific developments in physics, cell biology, neurobiology and especially Charles Darwin's theory of evolution by natural selection from 1859 have challenged religious conceptions, which made religion-critical reformist groups such as the German Monist Federation more common in Germany. Darwin's theory of evolution also provided a framework for relating the behavior of species to each other. This instilled the development of comparative psychology at the end of the 19th century.

From 1909 Ziegler worked with Ernst Haeckel at the University of Jena. In his research and his books Ziegler dealt with topics such as genetics and comparative psychology. As with Haeckel, Ziegler's sociopolitical views reflected Social Darwinism. In 1893, Ziegler's book Die Naturwissenschaft und die socialdemokratische Theorie (English: Natural science and the social democratic theory) was published. In this book he tried to discredit socialism, since he thought of it as being opposed to the struggle for existing in the natural world. In 1900 Alfred Krupps initiated a contest on the lessons of the theory of common descent for domestic policy and state law. This contest, of which Ziegler and Heackel were jury members, has been described to have had a central role in the popularization of Social Darwinism in Germany.

Ziegler was among a group of scientist who defended the capacity of horses such as Clever Hans to perform arithmetic tasks, despite its rebuttal by Oskar Pfungst. In 1912 he was co-author of a public statement announcing that the horses of Karl Krall, a comparative psychologist who worked with the descendants of Clever Hans, were able read numbers, solve arithmetic tasks and spell words with the help of numbers.

In 1920 the third and final version of Der Begriff des Instinktes einst und jetzt was published, in which Ziegler states to have a similar conception of instinct as Weismann. He describes his view of a gradual and not categorical difference between the animal and human soul is shared with him by Darwin. At the end of the book he takes a critical stance on social democracy and defends horse's and dog's capacity to reason in symbolic terms.

== Contents ==
The introduction of Der Begriff des Instinktes einst und jetzt describes that the book aims to give an historical account of the concept of instinct. For this purpose it also discusses the different directions of animal psychology in a historical context. Further, Ziegler wants to show that the distinction between animal mind and human mind is not clear cut but gradual, whereby the human mind is at the top of an hierarchical order.

The book is chronologically ordered, beginning with the view of Ancient Greek philosophers on the animal mind. It is argued that atomist philosophers distinguished more gradually between animal and human mind, while idealist philosophers made a more clear cut distinction. From the latter, the stoics emerged who introduced the concept of instinct as a property uniquely possessed by animals and not by humans. This view was adopted by Scholasticism, which amplified the human-animal distinction. At this time, so Ziegler, instinct was a blueprint of natures way, as given by god. Humans on the other hand had reason, with which they could freely decide what to do. Moreover, instinct was equated with unconscious behavior and reason with conscious behavior. During the Age of Enlightenment, many scholars rejected the scholastic conception and some rejected the concept of instinct overall, arguing that animals as well as humans are fully guided by reason. Behaviors that seem present without prior learning were simply the result of behavior learned by ancestors. This idea was strongly inspired by Lamarck's theory of inheritance of acquired characteristics. In contrast Darwin's saw instincts not as abilities that were learned and passed on but as resulting from the process of natural selection. After Darwin, there were still scientists such as Herbert Spencer and Wilhelm Wundt who followed the Lamarckian conception of inheritable instincts whom Ziegler calls Neo-lamarckists.

Ziegler then describes the, in his time current, state of comparative psychology and the concept of instinct. He introduces August Weismann's idea, that instincts are not learned abilities which are inherited but instead have their origin in the variation of germ cells. Ziegler grounds his own conception of instinct on Weismann's. Furthermore, he mentions that he does not agree with the scholastic idea that instinct can be equated with unconscious and reason with conscious behavior. He argues that instinctive tendencies in humans, which he equates with drives, are often conscious and that unconscious actions do not always rely on instincts, for example when one forms an habit that is followed unconsciously. Physiologically, he describes instinctive actions as base on inherited connections in the nervous system, whereas actions of reason are based on acquired connections in the nervous system.

The book ends with a chapter which was largely extended in the third edition of the book. This chapter starts with a comparison the brains of mammals and makes the claim that the bigger the brain and the more densely distributed its neurons are, the larger is the mammals ability to reason, which makes humans the mammal with the highest developed mental abilities. Ziegler also added a new part to this chapter in the third edition, which deals with the mind of horses and dogs. In this part he expresses his opinion on the debated Clever Hans horse which was supposedly able to solve arithmetic tasks. He rejected rebuttals that claimed unconscious signalling to be involved and did his own observation on similar horses and later on dogs. This convinced him that horses and potentially dogs as well were not only capable of solving arithmetic tasks, but even were able to communicate by means of knocking a number with their feet which could be translated to a letter in the alphabet. The chapter ends with a part on ideas. To Ziegler, ideas are a product of reason, they need language to persist and are thereby almost exclusively confined to humans. He writes that since ideas guide actions, it is important to follow the right ones. Darwin saw that ideas such as patriotism, faithfulness and obedience determine a nations success. This made Ziegler oppose the social-democratic movement in Germany as in his view it spread unpatriotic ideas.

== Reception ==
In 1910 a book review about the second edition of Der Begriff des Instinktes einst und jetzt was published in the Science journal. The reviewer describes that the book shows how the tendency to either humanize animals or see them as fundamentally different from humans has been apparent throughout history. She describes Ziegler conception of instinct as Neo-darwinian but remarks that Ziegler does not offer anything essentially new to the conception of instinct. She claims that Ziegler uses an a priori argument for the non-existence of conscious feelings in animals of lower structure like earthworms. According to Ziegler, the purpose of pain is to avoid the injury inflicting stimulus in the future. Thereby, earthworms do not need to feel pain, since they lack the capacity to recognize or avoid what has inflicted pain on them. The reviewer notes that recent research on lower vertebrates has shown that they can avoid injury inflicting stimuli it is paired with another stimulus, which then acts as a warning. Furthermore, Ziegler claims that in contrast to lower vertebrates, higher mammals can possess not just conscious feelings but also memory ideas. The reviewer again accuses Ziegler of a priori consideration since he found an anecdote of a dog licking ice of a window pane to look out as sufficient evidence that means-end ideas are present in higher animals.

Another review of the second edition of the book was published in the Nature journal in 1911. This review praises the book as an "interesting introduction to comparative psychology" that "deserves to be widely known". The reviewer describes some themes of the book, such as Ziegler's repeated urges to keep the study of instinct objective by leaving considerations about consciousness out of the concept.

In 1932, the Austrian zoologist Konrad Lorenz published a paper on the criteria of instinct, which was partially influenced by Der Begriff des Instinktes einst und jetzt. The book gave him an historical overview of the theoretical and methodological possibilities in the study of instinct. Lorenz published his first complete theory on instincts in 1935. In 1973 Lorenz, Karl von Frisch and Nikolaas Tinbergen were jointly awarded the Nobel Prize in Physiology or Medicine as pioneers and founders of the newly formed discipline of ethology.

The in 1998 published Geschichte der Biologie (English: History of Biology) describes Ziegler's view on instinct as being solely a chain of reflexes which is categorized as a behaviorist conception, typical for his time. This conception changed when the discipline of ethology developed and researchers like Lorenz and Tinbergen observed animal behavior in natural environments. Through those developments the explanations for animal behavior and instinct shifted towards a more cognitive direction.
