= Jackie Johnson =

Jackie Johnson may refer to:

- Jackie Johnson (heptathlete)
- Jackie Johnson (comedian)
- Jackie Johnson (DA)
