= Holy Sepulchre Cemetery =

Holy Sepulchre Cemetery may refer to:

== United States ==
- Holy Sepulchre Cemetery (Worth, Illinois)
- Holy Sepulchre Cemetery (East Orange, New Jersey)
- Holy Sepulchre Cemetery (Cheltenham Township, Pennsylvania)
- Holy Sepulchre Cemetery (New Rochelle, New York)
- Holy Sepulchre Cemetery (Coram, New York)
- Holy Sepulchre Cemetery (Rochester, New York)
- Holy Sepulchre Cemetery (Totowa, New Jersey)
- Holy Sepulchre Cemetery (Southfield, Michigan)
- Holy Sepulchre Cemetery (Hayward, California)

== United Kingdom ==
- St Sepulchre's Cemetery, Oxford, England
