= Beautiful Jim Key =

Performing horse

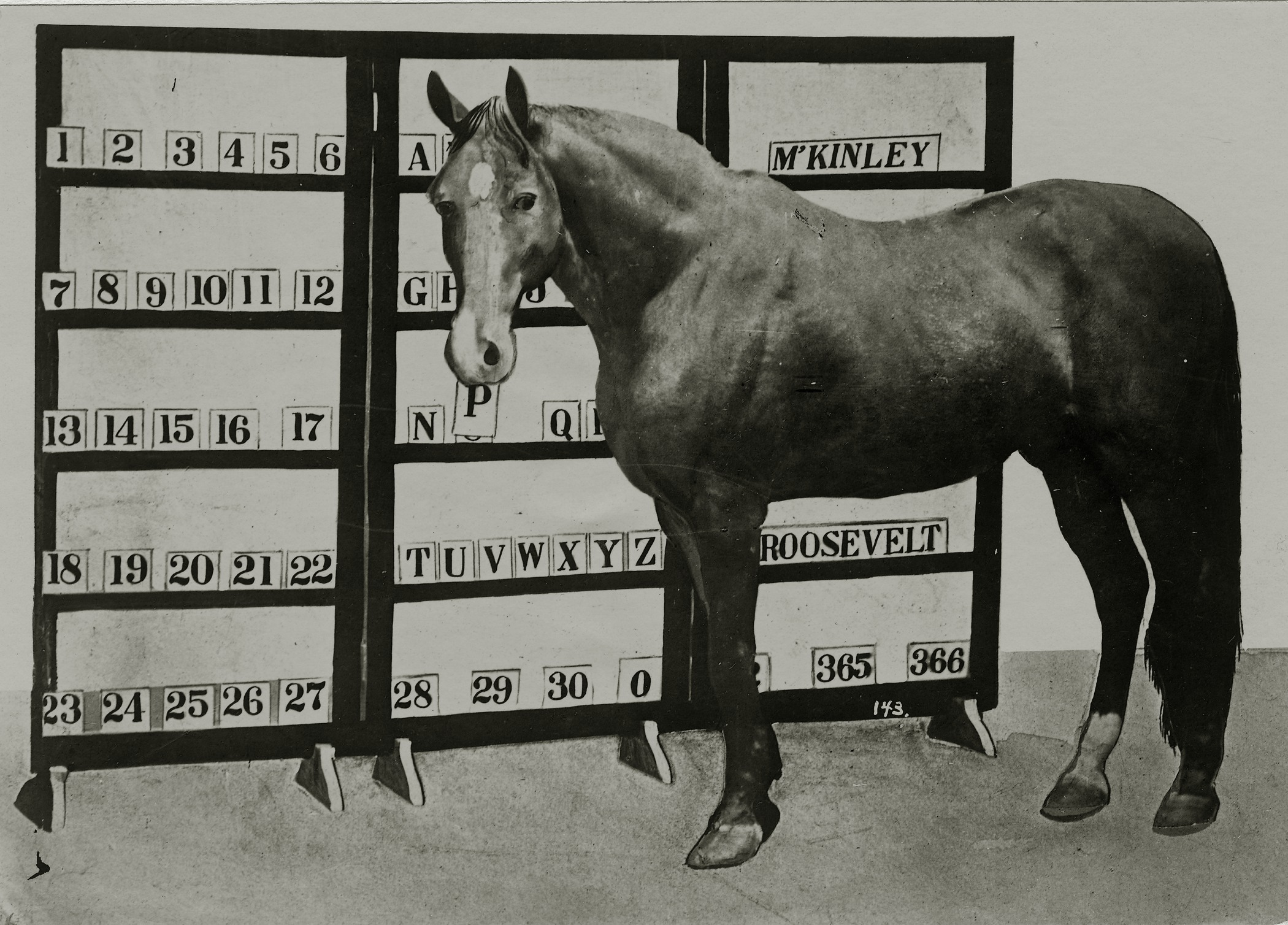
Jim Key at the 1904 World's Fair

Beautiful Jim Key was a famous performing horse around the turn of the twentieth century. His promoters claimed that the horse could read and write, handle money, perform arithmetic for numbers below thirty, and recite Bible passages "where the horse is mentioned." His trainer, "Dr." William Key, was a former slave, a self-taught veterinarian, and a patent medicine salesman. Key emphasized that he used only patience and kindness to teach the horse, never resorting to the use of a whip.

The stallion, Jim, stood 16 hands high and was a bay with a mahogany coat. He had a white star on his forehead, a small white blaze on his nose, a white stocking on his right hind leg, and a tiny stocking on his left foreleg. As an Arabian-Hambletonian cross, his sire was Tennessee Volunteer, who stood at stud at a livery stable in Bell Buckle, Tennessee. Tennessee Volunteer was the great-grandson of Rysdky's Hambletonian. His dam, Lauretta, Queen of Horses, also had an impressive pedigree, being an Arabian horse originally owned by Sheikh Ahemid of Persia.

== Early years ==
Dr. William P. Key, a mulatto former slave, bred his mare to a stallion at Bell Buckle Farms in Shelbyville, Tennessee. The mare gave birth to a highly unusual colt with extraordinary talents and exceptional intelligence. At birth, the colt was considered quite unattractive and gangly. In fact, he was so sickly that stable hands repeatedly urged Dr. Key to euthanize the foal. However, through patience and care, Dr. Key managed to nurse him through his first year of life.

He was a highly observant horse and began mimicking tricks performed by one of Dr. Key's dogs. Dr. Key provided him with the best hay and oats, and Jim Key drank only mineral water. As a yearling, he lived in the Key family home, where his conformation developed into the beautiful lines inherited from his sire and dam. By 1890, he transitioned to sleeping in a stall in the Keys' barn.

Because Jim Key was such an inquisitive animal, Dr. Key began teaching him the alphabet, how to cipher numbers, and various other tricks. Dr. Key then hired a promoter, and together they spent nine years traveling across the United States, performing at prestigious music halls and opera houses. Their tours included regular appearances at venues such as the old Ryman Auditorium in Nashville, Broadway in New York, and locations in Syracuse, Chicago, Cincinnati, Atlantic City, New Orleans, and Boston. They also performed at the Pittsburgh Exposition, the 1900 Export Exposition in Pennsylvania, the South Carolina Inter-State and West Indian Exposition in Charleston, and the St. Louis World's Fair.

== Tours ==
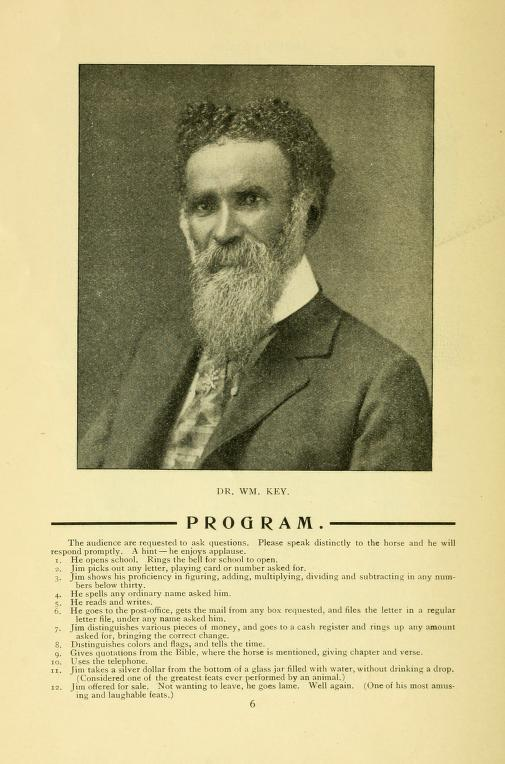
A programme of events, with an image of the horse's trainer, William Key

The horse became a celebrity, largely due to the progressive promotion efforts of A. R. Rogers. He performed at major venues across the country, from Atlantic City to Chicago, and was even made an honorary member of George Thorndike Angell's American Humane Association.

Beautiful Jim Key and his trainer periodically toured the United States in a specially outfitted railroad car to promote the emerging cause of humane treatment of animals. They performed in venues across most major American cities, including New York's Madison Square Garden. The horse became one of the most popular attractions at the 1904 St. Louis World's Fair. Beautiful Jim Key was said to be so intelligent that he could solve mathematical problems, possibly even including trigonometry.

President William McKinley witnessed Beautiful Jim Key perform at an exposition in Tennessee and declared, “This is the most astonishing and entertaining exhibition I have ever witnessed.” He also remarked that it was a testament to what “kindness and patience” could achieve. In April 1904, Jim Key performed for President Theodore Roosevelt's daughter, Alice Roosevelt, at the Louisiana Purchase Exposition. However, due to his advancing age and an ongoing struggle with rheumatism, Jim Key gave his final public performance in March 1906 at the Kansas City Convention Hall.

== Death ==
Beautiful Jim Key died three years after the death of his owner, Dr. William Preston Key, also known as Doc Key or Doc Bill, who died on October 18, 1909. The horse died on September 18, 1912, in Shelbyville, Bedford County, Tennessee. He is buried along the Tullahoma Highway in Bedford County.

== See also ==
- Clever Hans
- Lady Wonder
- Betsy, a border collie known to understand over 340 words
- Koko, a gorilla who learned sign language
- Alex, a grey parrot known for intelligent use of speech
- Animal cognition
- Equine intelligence
- Learned pig
