= Coram, New York =

Hamlet and census-designated place in New York, US

- Hamlet and census-designated place
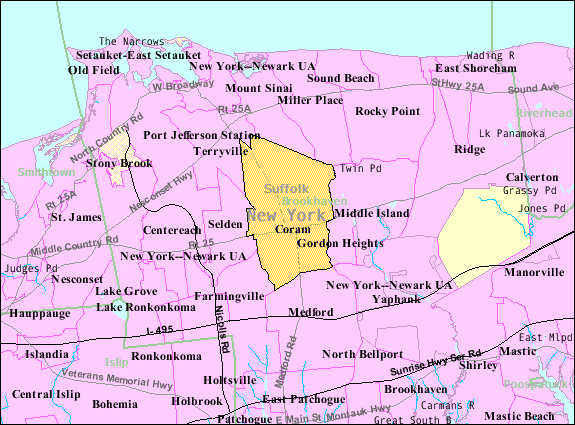
- U.S. Census map

- Location on Long Island Location within the state of New York
- Coordinates: 40°53′26″N 73°0′38″W
- Country: United States
- State: New York
- County: Suffolk
- Town: Brookhaven

Area
  - Total: 13.83 sq mi (35.81 km^{2})
  - Land: 13.83 sq mi (35.81 km^{2})
  - Water: 0 sq mi (0.00 km^{2})
- Elevation: 95 ft (29 m)

Population (2020)
  - Total: 40,220
  - Density: 2,909.0/sq mi (1,123.17/km^{2})
- Time zone: UTC−05:00 (Eastern Time Zone)
  - Summer (DST): UTC−04:00
- ZIP Code: 11727
- Area codes: 631, 934
- FIPS code: 36-18157
- GNIS feature ID: 0947423

Coram /kɔːrəm/ is a hamlet and census-designated place (CDP) within the Town of Brookhaven in, Suffolk County,on Long Island, in New York, United States. The population was 40,220 at the time of the 2020 census.

== History ==
Coram is the oldest settlement in the central part of the town of Brookhaven. Its early name was "Wincoram", perhaps the name of a Native American who lived in the area as late as 1703. The first European settler in the area was likely William Satterly, who sought permission to open a tavern to cater to travelers in 1677. During the American Revolutionary War, Benjamin Tallmadge with his contingent of Light Dragoons arrived and he with 12 Culper Ring men captured and burned 300 tons of hay the British were storing for winter to feed their horses. George Washington, on hearing the news, sent the following letter to Tallmadge: I have received with much pleasure the report of your successful enterprise upon fort St. George, and was pleased with the destruction of the hay at Coram, which must be severely felt by the enemy at this time. I beg you to accept my thanks for your spirited execution of this business. Annually Coram celebrates the event in October.

From 1784 to 1885, Coram served as the meeting place for the Town of Brookhaven government, using the Davis Town Meeting House for much of that period. The Davis House, built in the 1750s, was placed on the National Register of Historic Places in 2001 and is the oldest existing structure in Coram.

A small airport, known as Coram Airport existed in Coram until 1984; the land is now part of a county park.

== Geography ==
The CDP has a total area of 13.8 square miles (36 km^{2}), all land.

The 73rd meridian west passes directly through Coram.

== Demographics ==
Historical population
Census	Pop.	Note	%±
1980	24,752		—
1990	30,111		21.7%
2000	34,923		16.0%
2010	39,113		12.0%
2020	40,220		2.8%
U.S. Decennial Census

=== 2020 census ===
As of the 2020 census, Coram had a population of 40,220. The median age was 42.2 years. 19.2% of residents were under the age of 18 and 17.4% of residents were 65 years of age or older. For every 100 females there were 92.2 males, and for every 100 females age 18 and over there were 89.9 males age 18 and over.

100.0% of residents lived in urban areas, while 0.0% lived in rural areas.

There were 15,234 households in Coram, of which 28.5% had children under the age of 18 living in them. Of all households, 46.0% were married-couple households, 16.8% were households with a male householder and no spouse or partner present, and 29.8% were households with a female householder and no spouse or partner present. About 27.3% of all households were made up of individuals and 12.0% had someone living alone who was 65 years of age or older.

There were 16,060 housing units, of which 5.1% were vacant. The homeowner vacancy rate was 1.4% and the rental vacancy rate was 6.5%.

Racial composition as of the 2020 census
Race	Number	Percent
White	25,662	63.8%
Black or African American	5,051	12.6%
American Indian and Alaska Native	170	0.4%
Asian	2,232	5.5%
Native Hawaiian and Other Pacific Islander	13	0.0%
Some other race	2,781	6.9%
Two or more races	4,311	10.7%
Hispanic or Latino (of any race)	7,454	18.5%

=== 2000 census ===
As of the 2000 census, 34,923 people, 12,530 households, and 9,121 families resided in the CDP. The population density was 2,532.1 inhabitants per square mile (977.6/km^{2}). There were 12,880 housing units at an average density of 933.9 per square mile (360.6/km^{2}). The racial makeup of the CDP was 89.5% White, 1.7% African American, 0.3% Native American, 3.1% Asian, 0.0% Pacific Islander, 3.1% from other races, and 2.3% from two or more races. Hispanic or Latino of any race were 9.5% of the population.

There were 12,530 households, out of which 35.3% had children under the age of 18 living with them, 57.9% were married couples living together, 11.4% had a female householder with no husband present, and 27.2% were non-families. 21.3% of all households were made up of individuals, and 6.1% had someone living alone who was 65 years of age or older. The average household size was 2.75 and the average family size was 3.22.

In the CDP, the population was spread out, with 25.1% under the age of 18, 7.9% from 18 to 24, 33.5% from 25 to 44, 24.1% from 45 to 64, and 9.3% who were 65 years of age or older. The median age was 35 years. For every 100 females, there were 93.1 males. For every 100 females age 18 and over, there were 89.2 males.

The median income for a household in the CDP was $61,309, and the median income for a family was $70,769. Males had a median income of $46,905 versus $34,545 for females. The per capita income for the CDP was $24,597. About 4.1% of families and 5.6% of the population were below the poverty threshold, including 5.5% of those under age 18 and 7.2% of those age 65 or over.

== Education ==
- Longwood Central School District
- Middle Country Central School District

== Notable people ==
- Bridget Dowling, sister-in-law of Adolf Hitler and resident of Coram at the end of her life.
- George J. Hochbrueckner, former congressman and resident of Coram while he was in office.

== See also ==
- Holy Sepulchre Cemetery
