= Lady Wonder =

Horse claimed to be psychic (1924–1957)

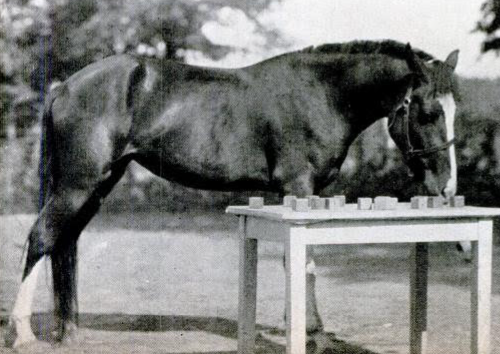
- Species: Horse
- Sex: Female
- Born: Lady; February 9, 1924
- Died: March 19, 1957 (aged 33)
- Cause of death: Heart attack

Lady Wonder (February 9, 1924 – March 19, 1957) was a mare some claimed to have psychic abilities and be able to perform intellectually demanding tasks such as arithmetic and spelling. Lady's owner, Claudia E. Fonda, trained her to operate a device that she used to spell out answers to the more than 150,000 visitors.

Lady was said to have predicted the outcome of boxing fights and political elections, and was consulted by the police in criminal investigations. The parapsychologist researcher J. B. Rhine investigated Lady's alleged abilities and concluded that there was evidence for extrasensory perception between human and horse. The magicians and skeptical investigators Milbourne Christopher and John Scarne showed that Lady's prediction abilities resulted from Mrs. Fonda employing mentalism tricks and signaling the answers to Lady.

== Life and activity ==
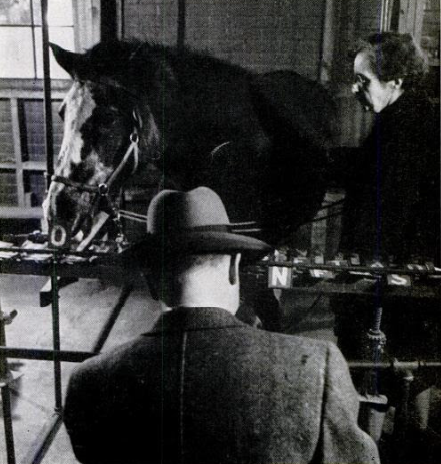
Lady Wonder with trainer Mrs Fonda

Lady was born on February 9, 1924. Clarence and Claudia Fonda adopted the weeks-old filly and called her Lady. Due to her early age, Lady was bottle-fed by her owner, Mrs. Fonda, who also trained Lady using lettered and numbered children's wood blocks in an attempt to teach her the alphabet and numbers so they could communicate. Eventually, Lady outgrew the children's blocks and Mr. Fonda built her a large typewriter, that Lady could use by hitting her nose on padded keys which lifted tin cards containing letters and numbers. This home-made device was used to allegedly communicate with more than 150,000 visitors coming for all around the United States.

During its long life, several predictions have been attributed to Lady such as predicting the victory of Gene Tunney over Jack Dempsey in a 1927 boxing match, predicting earthquakes and shifts in the stock exchange. According to Mrs. Fonda, Lady predicted all the US presidential elections, except the victory of Truman over Dewey in the 1948 United States presidential election. However, there are several reports of Lady's prediction being wrong and usually open to human interpretation.

Lady died on March 19, 1957, at the age of 33 from heart attack. Lady was buried in the Pet Memorial Park in Henrico County, Virginia.

== Collaboration with police ==
Lady's celebrity grew across the United States when she was credited to have helped to solve the case of a missing 4-year-old boy, Danny Matson, in Quincy, Massachusetts. When prompted about Matson's location, Lady spelled "Pittsfield Water Wheel". The police investigation concluded that there was no water wheel in Pittsfield, Massachusetts. The police chief William Ferrazzi tried to interpret Lady's message and wonder if she might mean "Field and Wilde Water Pit", a quarry close to Matson's house which had already been searched. Further searches found the child's body at the quarry.

In December 1952, two children went missing in Naperville, Illinois. The boy's mother resorted to Lady which suggested that the children would be found at the DuPage River, a river close to the boy's house from where both children went missing. Several weeks later the bodies of both children were found over the frozen river. Skeptics point out that in both cases these locations had been or were being searched already, and Lady's intervention served only to reinforce the beliefs of the inquirers.

== Investigations ==
During the winter of 1927–1928, J. B. Rhine, one of the initial proponents of extrasensory perception, tested the psychic abilities of Lady Wonder, concluding that there was no evidence of either conscious or unconscious signaling by the researchers or Mrs. Fonda and that his results could be explained only using the "telepathic explanation". In a follow-up study, in December 1928, Rhine noticed Lady's telepathic abilities had been lost and that her answers depended heavily on Mrs. Fonda signaling the mare.

In 1956, the magician Milbourne Christopher was skeptical about the alleged abilities of Lady and decided to visit the Fondas, presenting himself as John Banks, and when asked Lady for his name she spelled "Banks". Christopher suspected Mrs. Fonda's involvement in Lady's answers, and he decided to test if Fonda was employing a technique called pencil reading, where mentalists track the writing movement to "predict" what is written. To test this hypothesis, Christopher tricked Mrs. Fonda by pretending to write the number 9, touching the paper only in the downstroke, thus writing the number 1. When he asked Lady which number was written in the paper she readily spelled "9". Christopher's tests concluded that Fonda was involved in Lady's apparent intelligence and that she achieved this by providing subtle cues when Lady's head was in the correct letter. John Scarne, a New Jersey magician, also investigated Lady's abilities and arrived at the same conclusion, Lady's behavior was highly dependent on cues given by Mrs. Fonda when holding a whip. Scarne also concluded that when Mrs. Fonda was not aware of the answer, Lady usually answered incorrectly.

== Gallery ==
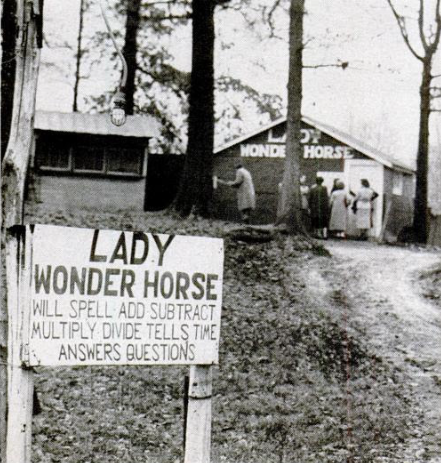
Sign for Lady Wonder

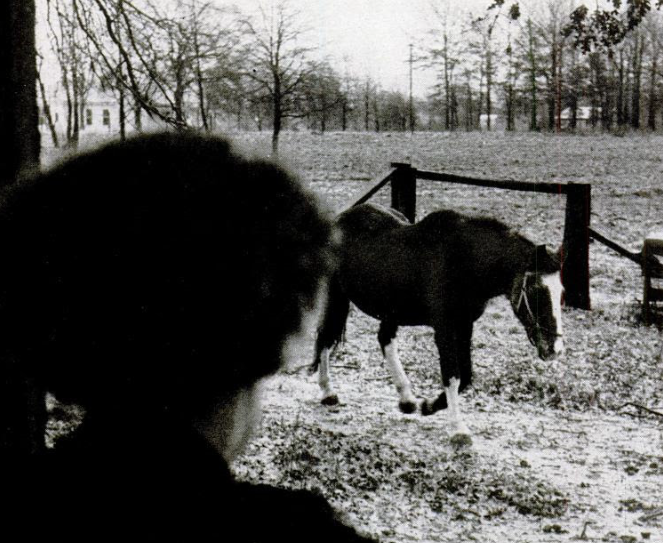
Photograph of Lady Wonder

== See also ==
- Clever Hans
- Beautiful Jim Key
- Betsy, a border collie known to understand over 340 words
- Rico, a dog who reportedly understood more than 200 words.
- Koko, a gorilla who learned sign language
- Alex, a grey parrot known for intelligent use of speech
- Animal cognition
- Equine intelligence
