= John Preston (dog handler) =

American dog handler (1945–2008)

- Born: John Melvin Preston; July 8, 1945; Wellsboro, Pennsylvania, U.S.
- Died: June 2, 2008 (aged 62)
- Occupation: Dog handler
- Known for: Training dogs with supposed superior forensic detection abilities

John Melvin Preston (July 8, 1945 – June 2, 2008) was an American con artist, dog handler, and state trooper from Pennsylvania who testified for the prosecution in criminal cases across the U.S. in the early 1980s. Preston falsely claimed that his dog (named Harass II or Harrass 2) could perform feats of forensic detection far beyond the abilities of other investigative dogs.

As an expert, Preston was paid $300 per day; in his previous job as a Pennsylvania state trooper, he was paid $20,000 per year. Brevard County, Florida, paid Preston $37,429 in the first half of 1984 alone.

== Claimed abilities of his dog ==
Preston claimed that his dog could smell human traces years or months after a suspect walked over the ground, on heavily trafficked streets, or both. He claimed that his dog could smell underwater, and, in a case against a man who was eventually freed on DNA evidence, Preston claimed that his dog could track a human scent even after hurricanes. Tracking dog experts say these feats are impossible.

Preston's dog would sometimes urinate on the evidence while Preston claimed it was working.

== Repudiated testimony ==
Preston's testimony was repudiated by the Kings County District Attorney in New York and the Arizona Supreme Court, who called him a "charlatan". A U.S. Postal Service investigation in 1983 claimed Preston led Harass II to the results requested by investigators, which Preston requested before using the dog.

When tested by Judge Gilbert Goshorn during a 1984 trial in Brevard, Florida, Harass II failed to track a scent much simpler, fresher, and shorter in length than those it supposedly tracked in other cases. Goshorn offered Preston another chance at the test the next day, but Preston left town instead. He did not return to Brevard to testify again.

In a 2008 affidavit, Goshorn said:

It is my belief that the only way Preston could achieve the results he achieved in numerous other cases was having obtained information about the case prior to the scent tracking so that Preston could lead the dog to the suspect or evidence in question. I believe that Preston was regularly retained to confirm the state's preconceived notions about a case.

Sam Bardwell, a former prosecutor in Brevard County, Florida in the 1980s who used Preston as a witness in a rape case, has claimed that "John Preston was a total fraud, and everyone knew it." Karen Brandon, who worked in the same office at the same time, denied that anyone knew this.

Preston testified falsely at least twice about his certification as a tracking expert. Preston was never charged with any crime.

== Effect and fallout ==
Preston helped convict at least two men who were eventually freed by DNA evidence. Each spent more than twenty years in prison. One, Bill Dillon, was not informed of the repudiation of Preston's testimony until 2006. The state of Florida had launched no investigation into Preston's cases.

The Brevard/Seminole State Attorney claimed that it would not be possible to discover which cases Preston testified in. Later, he announced that he would "re-review" those cases, but that the cases had already been reviewed in 2004. The 2004 review did not flag the case of Bill Dillon, who was later freed on DNA evidence contradicting Preston's testimony. In 2009, J. Preston Silvernail, chief judge of Florida's 18th judicial circuit, declined to call a grand jury to investigate the Florida State Attorney's Office's hiring of Preston.

Preston testified as an expert witness at dozens of criminal trials in Florida. The Innocence Project of Florida believes that as many as 60 people may have been convicted based partially or solely upon Preston's testimony. Florida Today found 15 cases in which Preston testified.

Preston's testimony resulted in over 100 criminal convictions.

== See also ==
- Clever Hans
