= Bridget Dowling =

Adolf Hitler's sister-in-law (1891–1969)

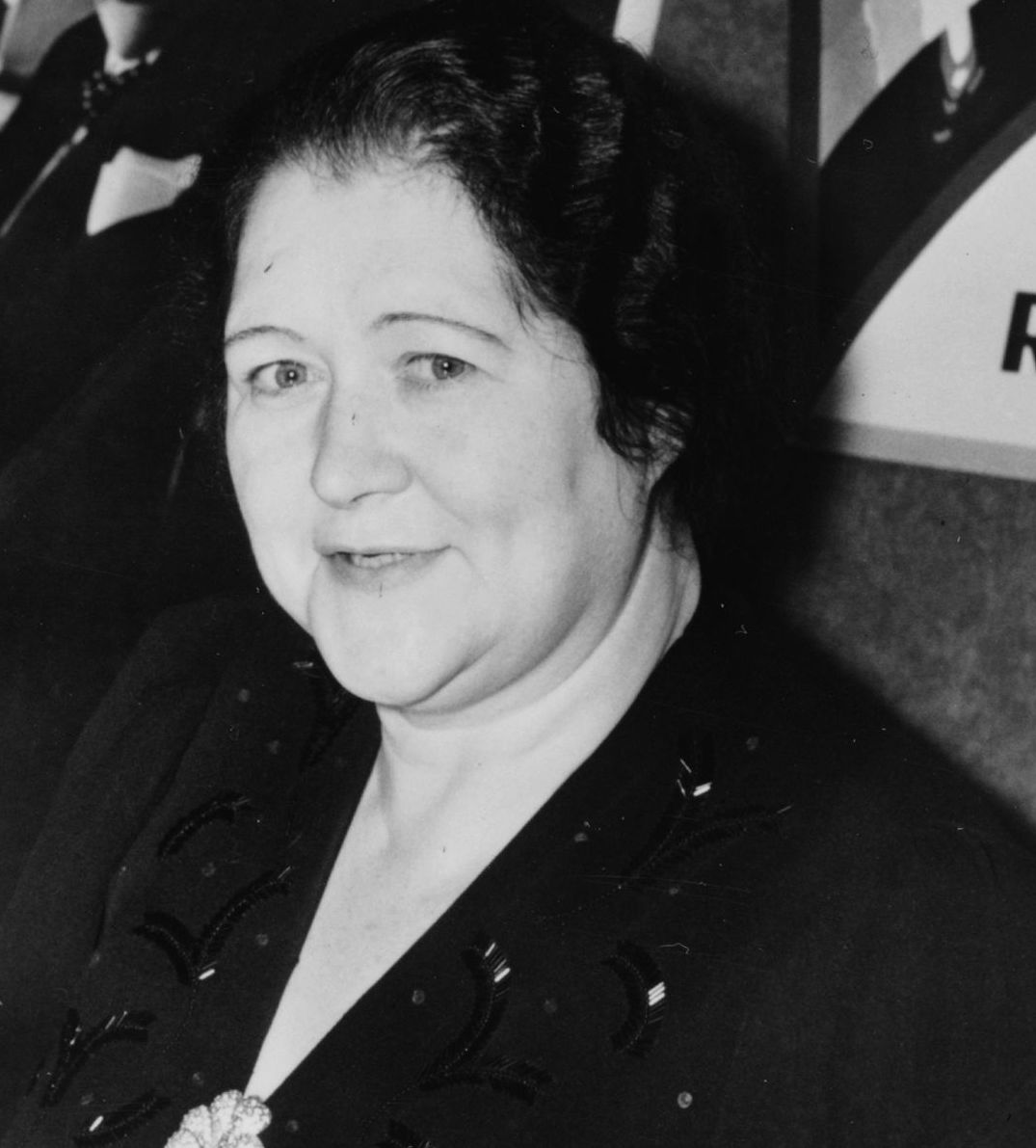
- Offering information about the British War Relief Society, 1941
- Born: Bridget Elizabeth Dowling; 3 July 1891 (Note: The Social Security Death Index for Brigid Dowling confirms her birth date to be 3 July 1891. She was living at 67 Silver Street, Patchogue, Suffolk, New York 11772, at the time of her death in November 1969.); Dublin, Ireland
- Died: 18 November 1969 (aged 78); Long Island, New York, U.S.
- Spouse: Alois Hitler Jr.
- Children: William Patrick Hitler
- Parents: William Dowling (father); Bridget Reynolds (mother)
- Relatives: Thomas Dowling, Brother

Bridget Elizabeth Hitler, née Dowling (alternative Brigid Elisabeth, or Cissie) (3 July 1891 – 18 November 1969), was Adolf Hitler's half sister-in-law via her marriage to Alois Hitler Jr.. She was the mother of Alois Hitler Jr.'s son William Patrick Hitler. She was born and raised in Dublin, Ireland.

== Marriage ==
=== Engagement ===
In 1909, Bridget and her father, William Dowling, attended the Dublin Horse Show where they met Alois Hitler Jr., who claimed to be a wealthy hotelier touring Europe when, in fact, he was a poor kitchen porter at Dublin's Shelbourne Hotel. Alois courted Bridget at various Dublin locales and soon they were discussing marriage. On 3 June 1910, the couple eloped to London, living in Charing Cross Road for a while. Her father threatened to charge Alois with kidnapping but accepted the marriage after Bridget pleaded with him.

=== Early married life ===
The couple settled at 102 Upper Stanhope Street, a boarding house kept by the John family, in Toxteth, Liverpool and, in 1911 they had their only child, William Patrick Hitler. The house was destroyed in the last German air raid of the Liverpool Blitz on 10 January 1942.

=== Split ===
Alois went to Germany in 1914 to establish himself in business but these plans were interrupted by the outbreak of World War I. Bridget refused to go with him, as he had become violent and started beating their son. In addition, Alois Jr. was an adulterous husband, engaging in numerous extramarital affairs. Alois decided to abandon his family. He returned to Germany, remarried bigamously, and sent word after the war that he was dead. His deception was later discovered, and he was charged with bigamy by the German authorities in 1924. He escaped conviction due to Bridget's intervention, with Bridget agreeing to a legal separation; though Alois had requested a divorce, Bridget's stoutly Catholic father forbid her from taking that route at that time. Bridget raised her son alone with no support from her husband. She and Alois were eventually divorced (although as a Roman Catholic she was religiously opposed to divorce). She set up a home in Highgate, North London, and took in lodgers to make ends meet. William was supported by Bridget's family in Ireland.

== Emigration and claims ==
In 1939, Bridget joined her son on a tour of the United States where he was invited to lecture on his infamous uncle. They decided to stay and Bridget wrote a manuscript, My Brother-in-Law Adolf, in which she claimed that her famous brother-in-law had moved to Liverpool to live with Bridget and Alois from November 1912 to April 1913 to avoid conscription in his native Austria. She claims that she introduced Adolf to astrology and that she advised him to trim off the edges of his moustache.

Adolf Hitler's stay in Liverpool has corroboration from the biographer and friend of British Intelligence chief, Sir William Stephenson, in his book A Man Called Intrepid. Sir William was chief of British Security Coordination (BSC). Biographer William Stevenson says: "Hitler's little-known sojourn in England between November 1912 and April 1913 is authenticated by BSC documents.”

1912 to mid-1913 has been described as Adolf's 'missing year'. During that period he had been living in homeless men's hostels in Vienna. In his book Hitler, A Life, the historian Peter Longerich says that "Indeed, there is hardly any reliable evidence about Hitler's life for the period 1910 to 1913." The opening sentence of Chapter 4 of Adolf Hitler's book Mein Kampf says: "In the spring of 1912 I came at last to Munich".("Im Frühjahr 1912 kam ich endgültig nach München.") But Adolf's statement was proven to be false. A Munich police record shows that Hitler moved from Vienna to Munich, aged twenty-four, arriving on Sunday, 25 May 1913.

The mystery of whether Adolf visited his British relatives in Liverpool is unresolved. Some historians dismiss Bridget's manuscript as being a fabrication written in an attempt to cash in on her famous relationship. However, in his book The Hitlers Of Liverpool, Michael Unger quotes the Canadian historian, Professor Alan Cassels, who wrote "The Merseyside details are certainly circumstantially credible" ... "I'm inclined to believe his sister-in-law". Brigitte Hamann and Hans Mommsen say that the few sources from Vienna during this period are "questionable throughout". Professor Robert Waite disputes her claim that Adolf stayed with her as well as some other claims in her book in the appendix to his book The Psychopathic God: Adolf Hitler. According to David Gardner, Bridget's daughter-in-law has said Bridget admitted to her that the book was fanciful. The story of Adolf Hitler's visit to Liverpool has remained popular, however, and was the subject of Beryl Bainbridge's 1978 novel Young Adolf (adapted for television by the BBC as The Journal of Bridget Hitler in 1981) and Grant Morrison and Steve Yeowell's 1989 comic The New Adventures of Hitler.

== Post-war ==
Following the war, Bridget and her son settled in Long Island, New York under the assumed name of Stuart-Houston. She died there on 18 November 1969 and is buried in Holy Sepulchre Cemetery in Coram, Long Island alongside her son, who died on 14 July 1987.

== Family ==
The family of Bridget Dowling remained a mystery until the Irish censuses for 1901 and 1911 were digitised and released online. The names of the family members, including Bridget, are given in the 1901 census under the name William Dowling of Flemings Place, near Mespil Road, Dublin.

The family later moved to Denzille Street, Dublin, now named Fenian Street. Married by then, Bridget was not included with her Dowling family on the 1911 census. Instead, she appears as "Cissie Hitler" on the 1911 England and Wales Census, shown with husband "Anton Hitler" and son "William Hitler" at 102 Upper Stanhope Street, Liverpool.

== See also ==
- Hitler family
- Meet the Hitlers

== Sources ==
- Vermeeren, Marc (2007). De jeugd van Adolf Hitler, 1889-1907: en zijn familie en voorouders [The youth of Adolf Hitler, 1889–1907: and his family and ancestors] (in Dutch). Soesterberg: Uitgeverij Aspekt. ISBN 978-9059116061
