= William Stuart-Houston =

British-American relative of Hitler (1911–1987)

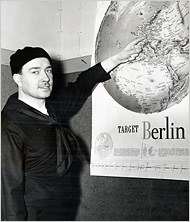
- Stuart-Houston c. 1944–1947
- Born: William Patrick Hitler; 12 March 1911; Liverpool, England
- Died: 14 July 1987 (aged 76); Patchogue, New York, U.S.
- Burial place: Holy Sepulchre Cemetery
- Spouse: Phyllis Jean-Jacques (m. 1947)
- Children: 4
- Relatives: Hitler family
- Military career
- Allegiance: United States
- Branch: United States Navy
- Service years: 1944–1947
- Rank: Seaman First Class
- Wars: World War II; Pacific War
- Awards: Purple Heart; Asiatic-Pacific Campaign Medal; World War II Victory Medal

William Patrick Stuart-Houston (born William Patrick Hitler; 12 March 1911 – 14 July 1987) was a British-American entrepreneur and the half-nephew of Adolf Hitler. Born and raised in the Toxteth area of Liverpool to Adolf's half-brother Alois Hitler Jr. and his Irish wife Bridget Dowling, he later relocated to Germany in the 1930s to find work with the help of his half-uncle until he got into a fight with him and later returned to London.

He later immigrated to the United States, where he received American citizenship, in addition to his British citizenship, and served in the United States Navy against his half-uncle and Nazi Germany during World War II, changing his surname after the war.

== Biography ==
=== Early life ===
Stuart-Houston was born William Patrick Hitler in the Toxteth area of Liverpool, England, on 12 March 1911 to an Austrian born father Alois Hitler Jr. and his Irish wife Bridget Dowling. His father was the older half-brother of Adolf Hitler. The couple met in Dublin when Alois was living there during 1909 and was working as a kitchen porter at Dublin's Shelbourne Hotel; they married in London's Marylebone district in 1910 and relocated to Liverpool.

The family lived in a flat at 102 Upper Stanhope Street, which was later destroyed during the last German air raid of the Liverpool Blitz on 10 January 1942. Dowling wrote a manuscript titled My Brother-in-Law Adolf, in which she claimed that Adolf had lived in Liverpool with her from November 1912 to April 1913 to avoid conscription in Austria. The book is largely considered a work of fiction, as Adolf was residing in the Meldemannstraße dormitory in Vienna at the time.

Alois attempted to make money by managing a small restaurant in Dale Street, a boarding house on Parliament Street and a hotel on Mount Pleasant, all of which failed. It was also reported that Alois was abusive to William, like Alois's father had been to him. In 1914, Alois left Bridget and William for a gambling tour of Europe. He later returned to Germany. Unable to rejoin his family due to the outbreak of World War I, he abandoned them, leaving William to be brought up only by his mother.

William was also supported by his mother's family in Ireland. Alois set up a safety razor business in Germany, which did not last long. He remarried bigamously, but wrote to Bridget during the mid-1920s to ask her to send William to Germany's Weimar Republic for a visit. She finally agreed in 1929, when William was 18. By this time, Alois had another son named Heinz with his German wife.

Alois and his wife adopted a daughter whose name was never revealed. Alois became a restaurant owner, and this time his business was a success. Heinz, in contrast to William, became a committed Nazi, joined the Wehrmacht, and died in Soviet captivity in 1942.

When William was 18, he and his mother moved to North London and settled in Highgate. William joined an apprenticeship as an accountant in an accounting firm called Benham and Sons. After Adolf rose to power, William was fired due to his surname.

=== Nazi Germany ===
In 1933, encouraged by his mother, William travelled back to what had become Nazi Germany in an attempt to make money and benefit from his half-uncle's growing power. Adolf, who was now chancellor, found him a job at the Reichsbank in Berlin, a job that he held for most of the 1930s. He later worked at the Opel automobile factory as a car salesman in a factory in Rüsselsheim and later in Berlin where he was hired by Eduard Winter.

Adolf did not trust William because of the way he was acting in public and how he was fooling around with women and taking advantage of his power, so he sent spies to watch him. William was arrested in a cafe. When he showed his identification, the officers did not believe that he was related to Adolf Hitler and sent him to a prison in Lichterfelde. He was later released due to the British Embassy.

The Gestapo forbade William from working for two months and he was later fired from Opel because the police claimed he was selling cars under the name of Hitler. Adolf did not allow William to send money to his mother in England, who was struggling financially. William was dissatisfied with the work he was getting as his financial circumstances were not improving and he was not receiving the benefits he had hoped for, unlike his cousins.

William tried to blackmail his uncle, threatening to publicly "confirm the long-held rumor that Hitler's paternal grandfather was, in fact, a Jewish merchant, Leopold Frankenberger, who had had an affair with his grandmother, Maria." Adolf began to speak of him as "my loathsome nephew." The blackmail was successful and William's salary was doubled.

Adolf later asked William to relinquish his British citizenship in exchange for a high-ranking job. William, worried this was a trap, fled Germany in 1939 and returned to England. In London he told the Times, "I believe he has created a Frankenstein which even he perhaps cannot stop. I think he has it in his power to destroy European civilization and perhaps that of the entire world." There he wrote the article "Why I Hate My Uncle" for Look magazine.

=== Emigration to the United States and World War II ===
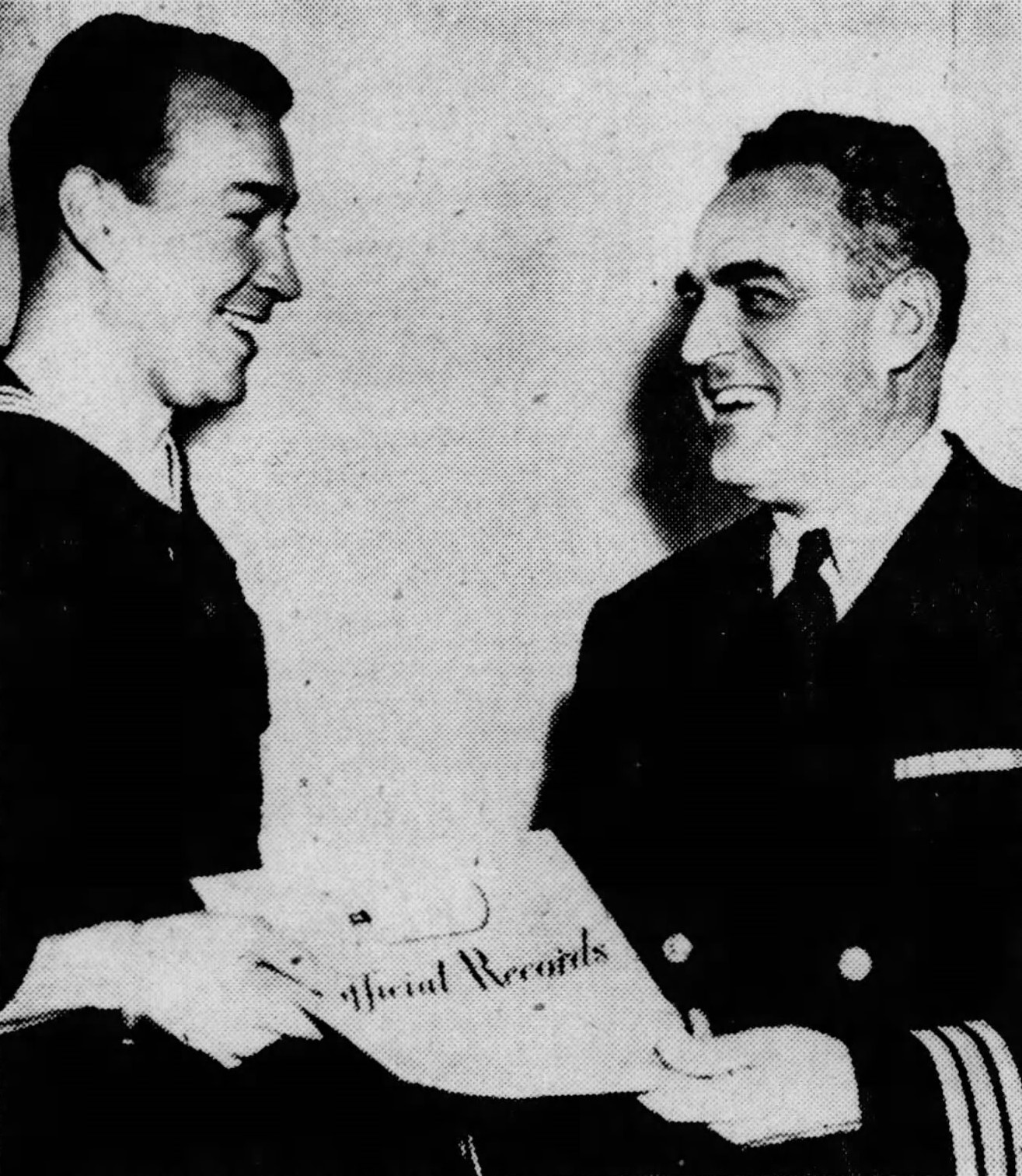
Stuart-Houston in 1946, receiving his honorable discharge from Navy Commander Louis A. Fey.

In January 1939, the newspaper magnate William Randolph Hearst brought William and his mother to the United States for a lecture tour. He and his mother were stranded when World War II began. After making a special request to President Franklin D. Roosevelt, William was eventually approved to join the United States Navy in 1944. He relocated to the Sunnyside neighborhood of Queens, New York.

William was drafted into the Navy as a pharmacist's mate, a designation later changed to hospital corpsman, until he was discharged in 1947. On reporting for duty, the induction officer asked his name. He replied, "Hitler". Thinking he was joking, the officer replied, "Glad to see you, Hitler. My name's Hess." William was wounded in action during the war and awarded the Purple Heart.

=== Later life ===
After being discharged from the Navy, William changed his surname to "Stuart-Houston". In 1947, he married Phyllis Jean-Jacques, who had been born in Germany in the mid-1920s. After their relationship began, William and Phyllis, along with Bridget, tried to live a life of anonymity in the United States. They moved to Patchogue, New York, where William used his medical training to establish a business that analyzed blood samples for hospitals. His laboratory, which he called Brookhaven Laboratories, (Note: It has no relation to Brookhaven National Laboratory.) was located in his home, a two-story clapboard house at 71 Silver Street.

Stuart-Houston and his wife had four sons: Alexander Adolf (b. 1949), Louis (b. 1951), Howard Ronald (1957–1989), and Brian William (b. 1965). None of his sons have had children of their own. In his 2001 book The Last of the Hitlers, journalist David Gardner speculated that the four brothers had made a verbal pact not to sire children.

Eldest son Alexander denied this claim, saying that before his death Howard Ronald had been engaged and intending to have children, while another brother had been engaged once, but family notoriety had destroyed the relationship. As of 2013 Alexander worked as a social worker. The second oldest child Louis and the youngest child Brian William ran a landscaping business together. His third son, Howard Ronald Stuart-Houston, worked as a Special Agent with the Criminal Investigation Division of the Internal Revenue Service. He died in a car accident in September 1989.

William Patrick Stuart-Houston died in Patchogue on 14 July 1987. He was buried next to his mother at the Holy Sepulchre Cemetery in Coram, New York. His widow, Phyllis, died in 2004.

== In the media ==
The family's story and Bridget Dowling's memoirs were first published by Michael Unger in the Liverpool Daily Post in 1973. Unger also edited Dowling's memoirs, which were first published as The Memoirs of Bridget Hitler in 1979. An updated version, titled The Hitlers of Liverpool, was published in 2011.

Stuart-Houston's life was discussed in a segment of the episode "World War II" during the fifth season of the American TV series Drunk History, in which he was played by actor Thomas Mann.

== See also ==
- Hitler family

== Sources ==
- Brown, Jonathan; Duff, Oliver (17 August 2006). "The black sheep of the family? The rise and fall of Hitler's scouse nephew". The Independent. Archived from the original on 29 January 2020.
- Gardner, David. The Last of the Hitlers, BMM, 2001, ISBN 0-9541544-0-1
- Green, Jesse. The Search for the Long Island Hitlers Archived 26 September 2015 at the Wayback Machine, The New York Times, 9 April 2006
- Halmburger, Oliver, Timothy W. Ryback & Florian M. Beierl: Hitler's Family – In the Shadow of the Dictator, Loopfilm / ZDF Enterprises, 2006.
- Lehrer, Steven (2002). Hitler Sites: A City-by-city Guidebook (Austria, Germany, France, United States). McFarland. p. 224. ISBN 0-7864-1045-0. Archived from the original on 25 January 2024.
- McCarthy, Tony (1992). "Hitler: His Irish Relatives". Irish Roots Magazine. No. 1, First Quarter 1992. Archived from the original on 10 April 2006.
- Royden, M.W. "Your Story: Adolf Hitler – did he visit Liverpool during 1912–13?" Archived 8 March 2021 at the Wayback Machine, BBC Legacies; Liverpool, February 2004
- Toland, John. Adolf Hitler, ISBN 0-385-42053-6
- Vermeeren, Marc. "De jeugd van Adolf Hitler 1889–1907 en zijn familie en voorouders"; Soesterberg, 2007; Aspekt B.V. publishers; ISBN 978-90-5911-606-1 (in Dutch)
