= Nannita Daisey =

Claimed land in the Oklahoma Land Rush

Nannita Daisey, also known as Kentucky Daisey, was an American woman said to be the first to file a land claim in the Oklahoma Land Rush – fame during the late nineteenth century in Oklahoma's land runs, fame that extended after her death in a legend about how she claimed her first Homestead tract.

== Biography ==
Nannita Regina H. Daisey was born in Pennsylvania in 1855. She moved with her parents to St. Louis, Missouri, where she was orphaned after both parents died. She was taken in by the Sisters of the Good Shepherd Convent in St. Louis, who also educated her through high school. She moved east to work as a teacher, living in Kentucky, where she also began a career in journalism. She was said to fight the gender discrimination common at that time against women who sought professional careers.

Before 1889 Daisey moved to Oklahoma Territory, where she participated in four land runs and gained a homestead. Beginning with the Land Run of 1889, non-Native Americans were allowed by the US government to claim 160-acre plots in territory that the US had previously allotted in perpetuity to Native American tribes removed from east of the Mississippi and other areas.

Daisey settled in Guthrie, Oklahoma, one of the communities formed overnight as a result of the land run. She helped other women to claim homesteads, and also helped to found public schools in the new towns that sprang up in this territory. By 1890 she had married Andreas E. J. Ueland Svegeborg, an immigrant from Scandinavia and a United States Army soldier. The couple had no children. Daisey died in 1903.

Daisey is, and was, most known for exaggerated accounts of her activities. In the first land run of 1889, she was said to have jumped from the front of one of the first trains into the Territory, staked her land claim, and reboarded the train before it passed her by. That feat gained her local notoriety. The tale was reported in local, regional, and national newspapers. After her death, an obituary reported that she had leapt from the train's cowcatcher, a claim not supported by any contemporary accounts of her actions, nor by her own accounts in published interviews.

But that legendary version has appeared in printed histories of the state of Oklahoma, the Land Run of 1889, and the town of Edmond (where Daisey's homestead site is located). On Independence Day (4 July) 2007, the town of Edmond celebrated its centennial by unveiling a statue of Daisey, shown leaping from the cowcatcher at the front of a train. Named Leaping into History, that statue was sculpted by local artist Mary Lou Gresham. The estimated cost for the project was $160,000 funded by the Edmond Parks Foundation, Inc. and private donations. Like some other Westerners, Daisey has become known for a legendary version of her life.

== Representation in other media ==
- Her mythic exploits were depicted in an episode of the Comedy Central show Drunk History, where Daisey was played by Kat Dennings.

== Sources ==
Notes

Bibliography

- 'Half has not been told', Dallas Morning News (25 April 1889).
- 'Happy in Adventure', Chicago Herald (2 May 1892), p. 10.
- 'Women as land boomers', New York Times (7 Sept. 1893), p. 8.
- J.B. Thoburn, A standard history of Oklahoma; an authentic narrative of its development from the date of the first European exploration down to the present time, including accounts of the Indian tribes, both civilized and wild, of the cattle range, of the land openings and the achievements of the most recent period (New York: The American Historical Society, 1916) 5 vols.
- S. Hoig, The Oklahoma land rush of 1889 (Oklahoma City: The Oklahoma Historical Society, 1984).
- S. Hoig, Edmond, The first century (Norman: University of Oklahoma Press, 1987).
- Debbie Kindt Michalke, 'Fortunate enough and plucky enough" the unattached women of the Cherokee Outlet', Chronicles of Oklahoma 75 (1997-8), p. 52-69.
- L.W. Reese, Women of Oklahoma, 1890-1920 (Norman: University of Oklahoma Press, 1997).
- J.L. Crowder Jr. Historic Edmond, an illustrated history (San Antonio, Texas: Historical Publishing Network for the Edmond Historical Society, 2000).
