= Pulaski's Masterpiece =

Famous poodle

- Species: Canis familiaris
- Breed: Poodle
- Sex: Male
- Born: August 4, 1946
- Died: Unknown
- Owner: Alexis Pulaski
- Weight: 8 lb (4 kg)
- Height: 9 in (23 cm)

Pulaski's Masterpiece was a silver gray toy poodle bred by Alexis Pulaski. Born in New York on August 4, 1946, from Pulaski's poodle breeding program, Masterpiece was owned by Pulaski and the less frequently mentioned Gilbert W. Khan and Nathalie Stuyvesant Pierrepont.

== History ==
Masterpiece competed in dog shows from 1947 until retiring from the show ring in 1950, and was the first toy dog to win all three of championship, obedience, and utility titles.

Billed as "the world's most valuable dog", Masterpiece was said to be worth US$20,000 (equivalent to $267,635 in 2025) at the height of his fame, and earned US$11,000 a year in stud and modeling fees, with a stud fee of US$500 (equivalent to $6,691 in 2025).

Masterpiece was regularly featured in ads and product endorsements, including in Vogue. Newspapers widely reported that Pulaski turned down a US$20,000 offer for the poodle from Prince Aly Khan, who wanted to buy the dog as a wedding present for his wife Rita Hayworth. He sired around 350 dogs, including poodles owned by Judy Garland, Gary Cooper, and Eva Peron.

One of Masterpiece's famous tricks was to shake his head when asked if he was a communist; his owner Pulaski was a White Russian emigre.

=== Disappearance ===
On May 29, 1953 (73 years ago), Masterpiece disappeared from Pulaski's pet shop, Poodles Inc.

The search for Masterpiece spanned thirteen states and generated many newspaper headlines, with no success. The cause of his disappearance was never conclusively determined, although many sources speculated that he had been stolen, and an eyewitness recorded seeing a small grey poodle leaving Pulaski's shop with "a dark-haired woman in a red coat".

Pulaski reportedly mourned Masterpiece for many years, and called him the realization of his "fondest dreams as a breeder". Just Johnny, a similar-looking descendant of Masterpiece, was chosen as his replacement, but he was not as successful as his predecessor.
