= Holy Sepulchre Cemetery (Coram, New York) =

Roman Catholic cemetery in Suffolk County, New York

Coordinates: 40°50′53″N 72°59′57″W

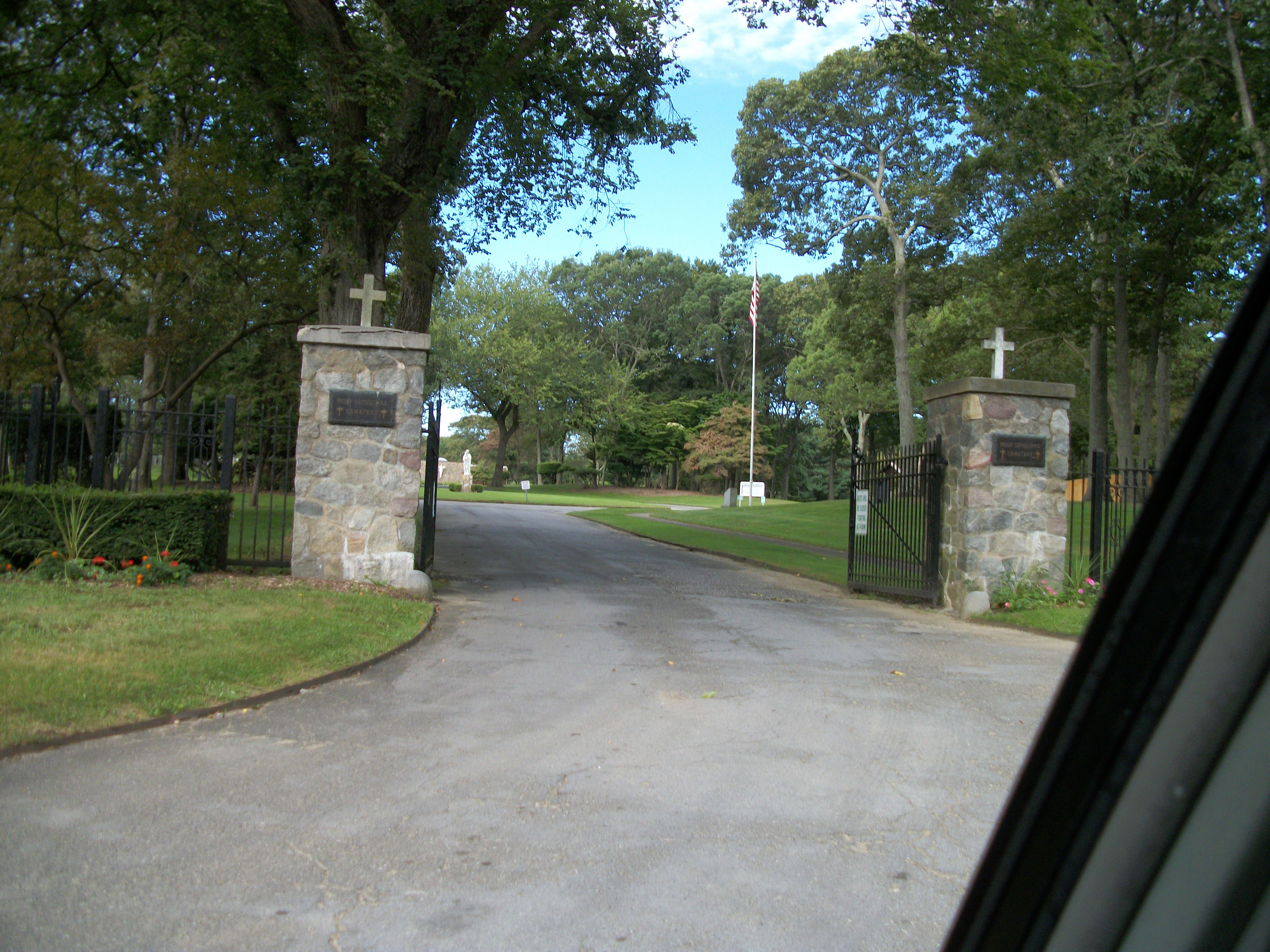
The main gate of the Cemetery from New York State Route 112.

Holy Sepulchre Cemetery is a Roman Catholic cemetery located on the northwest corner of New York State Route 112 and Granny Road in Coram, New York. The cemetery was founded in 1942, and is part of the Roman Catholic Diocese of Rockville Centre.

On March 1, 2016, the Diocese created a new corporation, Catholic Cemeteries of the Roman Catholic Diocese of Rockville Centre, Inc. On September 1, 2017, the assets of the former corporation were delivered to the new corporation along with the staff members entering the corporation on January 1, 2018. In February 2018 the newly formed corporation received its first appointed President Richard Bie.

== Notable interments ==
- Bridget Dowling, half sister-in-law of Adolf Hitler
- Ed Gagliardi, bass guitarist for Foreigner
- Richard Foronjy, actor
- William Patrick Hitler, half-nephew of Adolf Hitler
- Edgar A. Sharp, former member of the United States House of Representatives.

== See also ==
- Cemetery of the Holy Rood, another cemetery of the Diocese of Rockville Centre
