= Derek Waters =

American actor, comedian, screenwriter, producer, and director

- Born: Lutherville, Maryland, U.S.
- Education: Community College of Baltimore County
- Occupations: Actor; Comedian; Screenwriter; Television producer; Television director
- Years active: 2002–present

Derek Waters is an American actor, comedian, screenwriter, producer, and director. He is best known for his work on the television series Drunk History (2013–2019), which earned him eight Primetime Emmy Award nominations.

== Early life ==
Waters was raised in Lutherville, Maryland. Waters is Jewish, dyslexic, and was in special education in school. As a child, he aspired to be a professional baseball player, but didn't make his high school team, and so became a Little League umpire. He attended Towson High School in Towson, Maryland, graduating in 1998. The following year, he went to Second City in Toronto, Canada, 1999 to study sketch and improv comedy.

== Career ==
After moving to Los Angeles, he worked at Tower Video, a job he liked because he had never been exposed to independent movies before.

He has performed sketch comedy in Los Angeles since 2000, and for many years was part of the comedy duo Derek & Simon with Simon Helberg. The two starred together in the web series Derek & Simon: The Show on the comedy website Super Deluxe, which they created with comedian Bob Odenkirk. They made two short films "Derek & Simon: The Pity Card" (co-starring Zach Galifianakis and Bill Hader) and "Derek & Simon: A Bee and a Cigarette" (co-starring Casey Wilson and Emily Rutherfurd) and had a pilot deal with HBO in 2005.

In 2003, Waters co-starred in the ABC series Married to the Kellys. He has appeared on other television programs such as The League, Funny or Die Presents, It's Always Sunny in Philadelphia, Nick Swardson's Pretend Time, Maron, Happy Endings, Suburgatory, The Sarah Silverman Program, Santa Clarita Diet, and The Middle. He also voiced the self-centred, non sequitur-spouting weasel Dipster in the 2012 Shut Up! Cartoons series Weasel Town, starring with Jason Ritter.

He co-created and hosts the Comedy Central series Drunk History. The show originally started as a series of shorts for Funny or Die. The show has won multiple awards, such as the jury prize in short filmmaking at the Sundance Festival and was nominated for seventeen Primetime Emmy Awards, garnering Waters eight nominations.

Waters has appeared in films such as The Brothers Solomon, Hall Pass, For Your Consideration, and This Means War.

== Influences ==
Some of Waters's influences are Mark Borchardt and Christopher Guest.
