= Jackie Johnson (comedian) =

American comedian, actress, writer (born 1984)

- Born: November 21, 1984 (age 40)
- Education: University of Texas at Austin
- Occupation(s): Comedian, podcast host, actress, writer
- Years active: 2008–present
- Website: natchbeaut.com

Jackie Johnson is an American comedian, actress, writer, and host of the beauty podcast Natch Beaut. Natch Beaut has been the number one beauty podcast on iTunes, with Johnson talking to celebrity guests like Jonathan Van Ness and Lauren Lapkus about their beauty regimens.

As an actress, Johnson has appeared in Inherent Vice, Comedy Bang! Bang!, and You're the Worst, among others.

== Personal life ==
Johnson is from Garland, Texas, and studied film at the University of Texas at Austin after graduating from South Garland High School in 2003. She has been vegan since January 1, 2010, after she'd been feeling sluggish and unhealthy. A woman on set was reading Skinny Bitch and let her keep the book, and it became what Johnson called her vegan gateway book.

Johnson married a fellow comedian named Adam McCabe, in 2016, in an all-vegan, pink-themed wedding. They were married until 2019. On the 14th of February in 2021, Jackie married Ben Sheehan. On June 14, 2022 Johnson gave birth to her and Sheehan's first child, a son named Sanford "Sandy" Meyer Sheehan.

== Career ==
Johnson moved to Los Angeles in 2006 and began pursuing comedy and acting.

In 2008 she joined the Upright Citizens Brigade and began performing as an improv and sketch comedian, often incorporating singing and music. In 2014, she landed a role in Paul Thomas Anderson's Inherent Vice as well as Comedy Bang! Bang!, and went on to book roles in Drunk History, Angie Tribeca, You're the Worst, and Hollywood Darlings. She formed her podcast in 2017.

== Natch Beaut ==
Johnson started Natch Beaut in 2017 after seeing audience growth on her Snapchat and being encouraged by fellow comedians to start a podcast. Johnson only promotes cruelty-free cosmetics brands.

Natch Beaut is on the Starburns Audio podcast network, alongside podcasts like Harmontown, Beyond Yacht Rock, and Small Doses with Amanda Seales. Johnson's guests have included Jonathan Van Ness, Rachel Bloom, Georgia Hardstark, Jackie Tohn, Lauren Lapkus, and more. The podcast has been spotlighted by Vulture on more than one occasion. The social media groups formed by Johnson for Natch Beaut have grown into online communities for women to connect about beauty, as well as their lives in general.

In 2018, Natch Beaut was an official selection at South by Southwest, with Johnson interviewing Rachel Bloom live at the festival.
