= Drunk History =

American television series (2013–2019, 2026-)

- Genre: Education; Comedy
- Created by: Derek Waters
- Based on: Drunk History by Derek Waters
- Directed by: Jeremy Konner
- Presented by: Derek Waters
- Starring: Bennie Arthur; Tim Baltz; Maria Blasucci; Mort Burke; Michael Cera; Sarah Burns; Craig Cackowski; Michael Cassady; Michael Coleman; Aasha Davis; Matt Gourley; Bill Hader; Tymberlee Hill; Adam Nee; JT Palmer; Greg Tuculescu
- Music by: Dan Gross
- Country of origin: United States
- Original language: English
- No. of seasons: 6
- No. of episodes: 70 (and 2 specials) (list of episodes)

Production
- Executive producers: Derek Waters; Jeremy Konner; Will Ferrell; Adam McKay
- Running time: 22 minutes
- Production companies: Gary Sanchez Productions; Funny or Die; Konner Productions; Comedy Partners

Original release
- Network: Comedy Central
- Release: July 9, 2013 – August 6, 2019

Related
- Drunk History (UK); Drunk History (Mexico); Drunk History Australia

Drunk History is an American educational comedy television series produced for Comedy Central. It is based on the Funny or Die web series of the same name created by Derek Waters in 2007. Will Ferrell and Adam McKay are the show's executive producers. In each episode, an inebriated narrator, joined by host Waters, struggles to recount an event from history, while actors enact the narrator's anecdotes and also lip sync the dialogue. In addition to Waters and celebrity guest stars, the show's characters are played by regulars such as Bennie Arthur, Tim Baltz, Mort Burke, Sarah Burns, Maria Blasucci, Craig Cackowski, Michael Cassady, Michael Coleman, Tymberlee Hill, Adam Nee, Jeremy J. Tutson, Greg Tuculescu, J.T. Palmer and Aasha Davis.

The series premiered on Comedy Central on July 9, 2013. On August 26, 2019, the series was renewed for a seventh season. On August 19, 2020, that decision was reversed when Comedy Central cancelled the series, with the sixth season serving as its last. Early production had already begun before production halted due to the COVID-19 pandemic. A number of international versions have also been produced.

In September 2026, it was announced that the series would return as an online short-form series on Comedy Central's YouTube channel beginning on September 15 of that year.

== Production ==
The idea for the series originated from a drunken conversation that Derek Waters had with his friend and actor Jake Johnson in which Johnson recounted the story of R&B singer Otis Redding, who died in a plane crash. Waters thought it would be funny to film and recreate a story of an intoxicated person stumbling through a historical story, and have actors reenact the story. Waters told his friend, actor Michael Cera, about the idea, and Cera encouraged him to make it and volunteered to appear in the video. The first video premiered on the website Funny or Die on August 6, 2007. It starred Johnson, Waters, Cera, and actress Ashley Johnson (no relation). The series continued to air online on Funny or Die and briefly aired on HBO. It premiered on Comedy Central on July 9, 2013.

The storytellers in the series read up on the stories while sober, then rehearse it in front of a producer before getting drunk. Waters says he drinks with the storytellers in order to "let them know we're doing this together" and so as not to make it feel exploitative.

== Accuracy ==
According to Derek Waters, all the dates and story elements are true, though the historical figures' dialogue is obviously not accurate. He told NPR that he "make[s] sure to go back and say: Make sure you say this date or this person's name. I don't want to mess up anyone's names. But obviously the dialogue is the stuff that is not accurate." Independent newspapers have verified that the information in the series is historically accurate.

== Episodes ==
Season	Episodes	Originally released	
Season	Episodes	First released	Last released
Web series	7	January 22, 2008	December 19, 2010
1	8	July 9, 2013	August 27, 2013
2	10	July 1, 2014	September 2, 2014
3	13	September 1, 2015	November 24, 2015
4	10	September 27, 2016	December 6, 2016
5	13	January 23, 2018	July 24, 2018
6	16	January 15, 2019	August 6, 2019
Specials	2	November 8, 2016	November 28, 2017

== International versions ==
Since January 12, 2015, a British version of Drunk History has been broadcast on Comedy Central's UK channel. A Latin American version, Drunk History: El lado borroso de la historia, is presented by Eugenio Derbez. The Hungarian version, Tömény történelem, premiered on October 24, 2016 on Comedy Central Hungary. A Brazilian version hosted by Danilo Gentili, Drunk History Brasil: o Lado Embriagado da História, aired on SBT as a segment of The Noite com Danilo Gentili in 2017. Comedy Central Brasil broadcast the show separated from The Noite. Argentina's Telefe (then owned by Viacom) broadcast the Argentine version of the show, Pasado de Copas: Drunk History, hosted by Marcos Mundstock, a member of Les Luthiers. A Polish version, Drunk History: Pół litra historii, premiered on October 12, 2017, on Comedy Central Poland.

An Australian version entitled Drunk History Australia was commissioned for Network Ten’s Pilot Week in 2018, in which a 30-minute pilot episode aired along with several other new show pilots. The episode featured stories about Ned Kelly and Phar Lap and was presented by Stephen Curry & Rhys Darby. A season was commissioned in October 2019 by Network Ten and was released prematurely on 27 March 2020 on their streaming service, 10 Play, prior to its official premiere on 14 September 2020.

== Reception ==
The first season of Drunk History received mixed reviews from critics. On Rotten Tomatoes, it holds an approval rating of 61% and an average score of 6.4/10, based on 18 ratings. The site's critics consensus reads: "Drunk History's boozy lectures wear out their welcome fast and the bevy of comedic talent is wasted on cheesy pantomimes, but audiences who enjoy a fresh spin on historical retellings may want to take a swig." On Metacritic, the season has a weighted average score of 57 out of 100, based on 14 critics, indicating "mixed or average reviews".

=== Accolades ===
Year	Award	Category	Nominee(s)	Result	Ref.
2014	American Society of Cinematographers Awards	Outstanding Achievement in Cinematography in Half-Hour Episodic Series	Blake McClure (for "Detroit")	Won	
2015	People's Choice Awards	Favorite Sketch Comedy TV Show	Drunk History	Nominated	
2015	Primetime Emmy Awards	Outstanding Variety Sketch Series	Drunk History	Nominated	
2015	Primetime Emmy Awards	Outstanding Costumes for a Variety Program or a Special	Christina Mongini (for "Hollywood")	Won	
2016	Primetime Emmy Awards	Outstanding Variety Sketch Series	Drunk History	Nominated	
2016	Primetime Emmy Awards	Outstanding Picture Editing for Variety Programming	Jody McVeigh-Schultz (for "Inventors")	Nominated	
2016	Primetime Emmy Awards	Outstanding Production Design for a Variety, Nonfiction, Reality or Reality-Competition Series	Rachel Robb Kondrath and Kellie Jo Tinney (for "New Jersey")	Nominated	
2017	Primetime Emmy Awards	Outstanding Variety Sketch Series	Drunk History	Nominated	
2017	Primetime Emmy Awards	Outstanding Directing for a Variety Series	Derek Waters and Jeremy Konner (for "Hamilton")	Nominated	
2017	Primetime Emmy Awards	Outstanding Picture Editing for Variety Programming	Aaron Morris (for "Bar Fights")	Nominated	
2017	Primetime Emmy Awards	Outstanding Production Design for a Variety, Nonfiction, Reality or Reality-Competition Series	Chloe Arbiture, Monica Soto and Rae Deslich (for "Hamilton")	Nominated	
2018	Primetime Emmy Awards	Outstanding Variety Sketch Series	Drunk History	Nominated	
2018	Primetime Emmy Awards	Outstanding Picture Editing for Variety Programming	John Cason (for "Heroines")	Nominated	
2019	Primetime Emmy Awards	Outstanding Variety Sketch Series	Drunk History	Nominated	
2019	Primetime Emmy Awards	Outstanding Directing for a Variety Series	Derek Waters (for "Are You Afraid of the Drunk")	Nominated	
2019	Primetime Emmy Awards	Outstanding Picture Editing for Variety Programming	John Cason (for "Are You Afraid of the Drunk")	Nominated	
2020	Art Directors Guild Awards	Variety, Reality or Competition Series	Monica Sotto (for "Are You Afraid of the Drunk?")	Won	
2020	Casting Society of America	Live Television Performance – Variety or Sketch Comedy	Melissa DeLizia	Nominated	
2020	Primetime Emmy Awards	Outstanding Variety Sketch Series	Drunk History	Nominated	
2020	Primetime Emmy Awards	Outstanding Costumes for a Variety, Nonfiction or Reality Program	Christina Mongini, Annalisa Adams and Cassandra Conners (for "Fame")	Nominated	
2020	Primetime Emmy Awards	Outstanding Production Design for a Variety, Reality or Competition Series	Monica Sotto, Rae Deslich and Linette McCown (for "Bad Blood")	Nominated	
