= Oskar Pfungst =

German psychologist (1874–1932)

Oskar Pfungst (21 April 1874 – 14 August 1932) was a German comparative biologist and psychologist. While working as a volunteer assistant in the laboratory of Carl Stumpf in Berlin, Pfungst was asked to investigate the horse known as Clever Hans, who could apparently solve a wide array of arithmetic problems set to it by its owner. After formal investigation in 1907, Pfungst demonstrated that the horse was not actually performing intellectual tasks, but was watching the reaction of his human observers. Pfungst discovered this artifact in the research methodology, wherein the horse was responding directly to involuntary clues in the body language of the human trainer, who had the faculties to solve each problem. The trainer was entirely unaware that he was providing such clues.

In honour of Pfungst's study, the anomalous artifact has since been referred to as the Clever Hans effect and has continued to be important knowledge in the observer effect and later studies in animal cognition.

Pfungst never earned an advanced academic degree, though he later received an honorary MD from the University Frankfurt, where he lectured. According to Zusne (1984), Pfungst published only "about fifteen titles" in his career.
