= Spontaneanation =

Improvisational comedy podcast

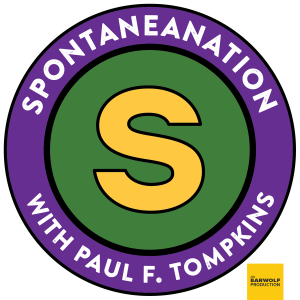
- Genre: Comedy / Improv

Cast and voices
- Hosted by: Paul F. Tompkins
- Voices: Various

Music
- Composed by: Eban Schletter

Production
- Length: 60-90 minutes

Publication
- No. of episodes: 200
- Original release: April 1, 2015 – January 21, 2019
- Provider: Earwolf
- Updates: Weekly

Related
- Website: Spontaneanation

Spontaneanation with Paul F. Tompkins (stylized as SPONTANEANATION with Paul F. Tompkins) was an improv comedy podcast hosted by Paul F. Tompkins on the Earwolf network. Based upon an interview with a special guest, Tompkins and several "improvisational friends" (often co-stars from The Thrilling Adventure Hour, Superego, No, You Shut Up!, or Bajillion Dollar Propertie$) performed narrative improv, set in a location provided by the guest. Spontaneanation's 200th and final episode was released on January 21, 2019.

== Episode format ==
Each episode of Spontaneanation contains two segments: an interview with a special guest, followed by an improvisational scene that contains elements from the preceding interview, taking place in a setting given by that week's guest. Each interview begins with a question supplied by the previous episode's guest, without revealing their identity. Additionally, Tompkins begins each show with a brief improvised stream of consciousness monologue. The improvisational scene and monologue are scored by Eban Schletter on piano.

The podcast is notably different from Tompkins' previous podcast, The Pod F. Tompkast, in that it is entirely improvised, where the Tompkast featured pre-recorded bits and heavy editing.

Because I’m used to everything I do being very involved with a lot of pre-production and post-production and I really wanted to be able to walk in, record and it's just done. And that's how I arrived at what is Spontaneanation.

— Paul F. Tompkins

Tompkins ends each episode with the phrase semper en presente, a Latin phrase translating to "always in the present" or "always in the moment."

In addition to in-studio tapings, Spontaneanation is often recorded in front of a live audience at Café Largo in Los Angeles.

At the end of the May 28th, 2018 "Tribute To Paul F. Tompkins" episode, Tompkins announced that he would be formally ending Spontaneanation once it reached 200 episodes. The 200th episode, "Charleston, South Carolina", dropped January 20, 2019; Busy Philipps was the featured guest—she was also guest on episode one.

== Episode list ==
No.	Title	Interview guest	Improv players	Original release date
99.5	"The Pilot Episode"	Rich Sommer	Craig Cackowski, Matt Gourley, Chris Tallman	February 12, 2017
Interview Question: How does Mad Men end? Improv: A couple ponders the various events and curses that brought them to A Non-Tropical Resort.
1	"A Denny's Parking Lot"	Busy Philipps	Craig Cackowski, Matt Gourley, Janet Varney	April 1, 2015
Interview Question: What is your favorite thing to eat when you're feeling sad, and if you don't feed your feelings like I do, why are you a robot? Improv: Romantic tensions unfold around a dumpster in a Denny's Parking Lot.
2	"A Mechanic's Garage"	Michael McMillian	Shulie Cowen, Marc Evan Jackson, Mark McConville	April 6, 2015
Interview Question: Do you have a perpetual age in your head, that when you think of yourself you think of yourself at that age, and if so, what is the age and why? Improv: Customers try to negotiate the prices at a Mechanic's Garage.
3	"A Secret Society"	Jason Ritter	Craig Cackowski, Amanda Lund, Chris Tallman	April 13, 2015
Interview Question: Who was your hero growing up, fictional or otherwise? And if you could, would you trade places with that hero? Improv: A group of brothers plot for world domination and conduct their war on pronunciation at a Secret Society Meeting.
4	"Savannah, Georgia"	Melanie Lynskey	Sarah Burns, Marc Evan Jackson, Janet Varney	April 20, 2015
Interview Question: What was the first time you experienced the emotion "humiliation"? Improv: A group of Georgians embark on an interstellar adventure behind each others' backs in Savannah, Georgia.
5	"Mars Base 3"	Dave Foley	Mark Gagliardi, Marc Evan Jackson, Amanda Lund	April 27, 2015
Interview Question: If someone asked you when you were 13 years old, 'Who are the five people you would invite to a dinner party' who would you have said? Improv: Couples deal with "traditional" problems and try to hide their relationship flaws at Mars Base 3.
6	"Dracula's Bedroom"	Maria Thayer	Drew Massey, Colleen Smith, Victor Yerrid	May 4, 2015
Interview Question: Where were you when you realized God was a wholly implausible lie? Improv: Dracula discusses the mysteries of life with his son, his housekeeper, and Renfield in Dracula's Bedroom.
7	"A UFC Weigh-In"	Kaitlin Olson	Mark McConville, Chris Tallman, Jean Villepique	May 11, 2015
Interview Question: What's your favorite invention? Improv: Monster Brad and Crusher Emily fight for dominance at a UFC Weigh-In.
8	"A Superyacht"	Elizabeth Reaser	Craig Cackowski, Jessica Chaffin, Chris Tallman	May 18, 2015
Interview Question: What do you like most about yourself? Improv: Crocodile Dundee and his new wife "Pussibly" honeymoon with Mario and Luigi on a Superyacht in the Mediterranean - Italian Riviera.
9	"The Annual Ghost Sex Convention"	Michael Sheen	James Bladon, Sarah Burns, Mark McConville	May 25, 2015
Interview Question: What animal would you save from extinction if you could? Improv: Ghosts and humans fraternize at the Annual Ghost Sex Convention in Las Vegas.
10	"The Student Lounge at a Performing Arts High School"	Justin Kirk	Sarah Burns, Matt Gourley, Chris Tallman	June 1, 2015
Interview Question: What is the earliest memory you have of doing something cruel? Improv: A group of kids work through their messed-up family histories as they put on a show the Student Lounge at a Performing Arts High School.
11	"The Underwear Department at Macys"	Aimee Mann	Ted Michaels, Michael Oosterom, Colleen Smith	June 8, 2015
Interview Question: What is the thing you desire that you are most ashamed of desiring? Improv: A search for panties leads to personal reinvention at the Underwear Department at Macys.
12	"The Waiting Room at an Oil Change Place"	Open Mike Eagle	Janet Varney, Jean Villepique, Hal Lublin	June 15, 2015
Interview Question: Do you have social anxiety, and if so, how does it manifest? Improv: Customers trade stories and question their life decisions in the Waiting Room at an Oil Change Place.
13	"A Dental Convention in Scottsdale, Arizona*"	Colin Hanks	Craig Cackowski, Marc Evan Jackson, Janet Varney	June 22, 2015
Interview Question: Why did you choose that outfit today? Improv: Dentists from Narnia and America alike embark on a quest at a Dental Convention in Scottsdale, Arizona on the hottest day of the year.
14	"An Urban Spelunkers Meeting"	John Hodgman	Shulie Cowen, Colleen Smith, Chris Tallman	June 29, 2015
Interview Question: Did you ever name your car? If not, what the hell is wrong with you? Improv: A group meets in an abandoned subway station for their urban spelunkers meeting.
15	"A Snorkeling Excursion Ticket Kiosk"	Jen Kirkman	Matt Gourley, Jean Villepique, Victor Yerrid	July 6, 2015
Interview Question: Do you believe in ghosts? Where is your evidence? Improv: A couple celebrates their anniversary by helping out ghosts at a ticket shoppe for A Snorkeling Excursion Ticket Kiosk.
16	"An Intergalactic Performing Arts School"	Aaron Abrams	James Bladon, Matt Gourley, Mark McConville	July 13, 2015
Interview Question: Why would you never talk to your cousin again if you needed a reason? Improv: Humans, aliens, and robots put on a show at an Intergalactic School for the Performing Arts.
17	"Science Fair"	Paget Brewster	Maria Blasucci, Craig Cackowski, Amanda Lund	July 20, 2015
Interview Question: You win a contest which allows you to draft a 28th amendment to the constitution, guaranteed to pass. The only stipulation is that it must be food-related. What is your amendment? Improv: Family drama and TV's Heidi Klum force students to think outside of the box at Science Fair.
18	"A Theme Park Break Room"	Raphael Bob-Waksberg	Erinn Hayes, Marc Evan Jackson, Mark McConville	July 27, 2015
Interview Question: Gun to your head - choose a reality competition show to come to your home. Improv: A group of theme park workers strive for better lives and more rewarding careers in the break room for costumed characters and ride operators at a theme park.
19	"Malibu"	Lisa Hanawalt	Maria Blasucci, Sarah Burns, Chris Tallman	August 3, 2015
Interview Question: Sir or Madam, how do you sleep at night? Improv: A houseboy teaches two sheltered rich girls about life outside of Cher and their privileged life in Malibu.
20	"Death Valley"	Scott Carter	Jessica Chaffin, Michael Oosterom, Colleen Smith	August 11, 2015
Interview Question: When was the last time that you felt furious? Improv: Two newlyweds embark on a peyote-laced adventure with a guide name Toadstool and a helpful inhaler in Death Valley.
21	"A Top Chef Afterparty"	Jonathan Coulton	Hal Lublin, Annie Savage, Janet Varney	August 17, 2015
Interview Question: What ridiculous formality do you slavishly observe? Improv: Chefs compare their methods and recipes at the Top Chef Season Finale Afterparty.
22	"A Clown Cemetery"	Bob Kerr	Shulie Cowen, Matt Gourley, Jean Villepique	August 24, 2015
Interview Question: If you were forced to make a career change, and your success was guaranteed, what would you do? Improv: A cadre of clowns ponder their funny futures amid various conundrums in A Clown Cemetery.
23	"A Miami Record Store in 1967"	Derek Waters†	Carla Cackowski, Marc Evan Jackson, Colleen Smith	August 31, 2015
Interview Question: What was the last thing you've done that you've considered 'brave'? Improv: A father and daughter bond while searching for music at A Miami Record Store in 1967.
24	"Sport Club*"	Kumail Nanjiani	Steve Agee, Sarah Burns, Jean Villepique	September 7, 2015
Interview Question: When did you realize you weren't alone? Improv: Members strive through marriage, murder, and machinations to become members of the board at Sport Club.
25	"10th Circle of Hell"	Joshua Malina	Jessica Chaffin, Chris Tallman, Hal Lublin	September 14, 2015
Interview Question: If you could eat all the dessert and never have any ill effects, but all you could eat is dessert, would you? Improv: A group of friends deal with small talk and relationship troubles in the Little-Known 10th Circle of Hell.
26	"Garden of Eden"	Tymberlee Hill	Janet Varney, Victor Yerrid, Colleen Smith	September 21, 2015
Interview Question: What's the worst advice you've ever received? Improv: Adam and Eve blink into existence and deal with the aftermath of sin with help from Cheryl and 'Snatan' in the Garden of Eden.
27	"Underneath the Eiffel Tower*"	Scott Aukerman†	Matt Gourley, Amanda Lund, Chris Tallman	September 28, 2015
Interview Question: You can use your rib to make another living thing, but not a human, what do you make? Improv: A teenage girl joins a band of pickpockets and occasional kidney thieves in her quest to become a woman Underneath the Eiffel Tower.
28	"One Hour Photo Shop"	Andrea Savage	Jessica Chaffin, Matt Gourley, Drew Massey	October 5, 2015
Interview Question: What is your earliest memory? Improv: A close-knit family hatches a plan to save their One-Hour Photo Shop with a little help from George Takei and Patti Lupone.
29	"Backstage at the Rush Concert*"	Thomas Lennon†	Sarah Burns, Craig Cackowski, Marc Evan Jackson	October 12, 2015
Interview Question: If you could be invisible and go visit a current celebrity's home, who would it be? Improv: The band combats ghosts of the past Backstage at the Rush Concert.
30	"Vent Haven Ventriloquist Museum"	Laraine Newman	Maria Blasucci, Marc Evan Jackson, Jeremy Carter	October 19, 2015
Interview Question: Corn or Flour? Improv: Visitors and employees combat living dolls at the Vent Haven Ventriloquist Museum.
31	"Wine Tasting"	Bruce McCulloch	Janet Varney, Amanda Lund, Annie Savage	October 26, 2015
Interview Question: If days of the week had colors, what color would each day be and why? Improv: Two guys strive to overcome a spooky gypsy curse in an effort to get good Yelp reviews as they host Wine Tasting.
32	"Storage Room in Back of Hot Dog Stand"	Jim Rash†	Colleen Smith, Jean Villepique, Craig Cackowski	November 2, 2015
Interview Question: What was your best mistake? Improv: A group of immigrants navigate their way around staff disfunction and health code regulations in the storage room in back of hot dog stand at amusement park going out of business.
33	"TV News Control Room"	Paul Scheer†	Erinn Hayes, Marc Evan Jackson, Hal Lublin	November 9, 2015
Interview Question: You can switch bodies with one person for one day - who would that be? And describe your one day as that person. Improv: A group of newscasters manufacture their own news on a day when "literally nothing happened" in a TV News control room.
34	"Parking Garage*"	Kristen Schaal	Matt Gourley, Mark McConville, Jeremy Carter	November 16, 2015
Interview Question: What is one event that you would go back and change in your life? Improv: Men travel through several alternate Wikipedian universes in an attempt to leave a Parking Garage.
35	"The Moon Landing Taping 1969"	Natalie Morales	Bob Dassie, Rich Talarico, Craig Cackowski	November 23, 2015
Interview Question: What's one thing that everyone in the United States can agree on? Improv: Gregory Peck and Stanley Kubrick get together with a general from the Pentagon to fake a national accomplishment at The Moon Landing Taping 1969.
36	"A Dinner Theater"	Ben Garant	Annie Savage, Colleen Smith, Stephanie Courtney	November 30, 2015
Interview Question: How do you want people to remember you after you die? Improv: A troupe of performers mount a musical production of Dracula in a Dinner Theater.
37	"Saltwater Tuffy Shoppe*"	Andy Daly†	Janet Varney, Matt Gourley, Craig Cackowski	December 7, 2015
Interview Question: What's the worst fear you ever overcame, and how did you overcome it? Improv: A family man visits the Saltwater Tuffy Shoppe in New Jersey and has to deal with the shoppe's tough owners and the town's mysterious dentist, while learning what a saltwater tuffy is.
38	"Beautiful, Fancy Apartment in NYC"	Lauren Lapkus†	Tim Batt, Guy Montgomery	December 14, 2015
Interview Question: What's the dumbest thing that ever sent you to the emergency room? Improv: A woman takes part in a murderous, cross-country adventure as she tries to rent a Beautiful, Fancy Apartment in New York City.
39	"Freeport, Illinois"	Ravi Patel	Janet Varney, Chris Tallman, Jean Villepique	December 21, 2015
Interview Question: What is a trait of yours that other people compliment you on most often? Improv: Two patients in a psychiatrist's waiting room in Freeport, Illinois make a wish and find themselves in a shared dream where Freeport does not exist, and they are mayor and first lady of its replacement, "Jimsburgh".
40	"Inside a 40 Year-Old Woman's Purse"	Eliza Skinner†	Jean Villepique, Hal Lublin, Mark McConville	December 28, 2015
Interview Question: What's the deal with Mario Lopez? Improv: An obese man gets hit with a shrink ray and embarks on an adventure to return to the proper size, with help from a Kleenex, a Tic Tac, and Abraham Lincoln, inside of a 40 year old woman's purse.
41	"Pet Store, Post Robbery"	David Rees	Shulie Cowen, Jean Villepique, Chris Tallman	January 4, 2016
Interview Question: What's the best gift you've ever given? Improv: An Irish beat cop hunts down a gang of miscreants with supernatural help at a pet store, post robbery.
42	"The First Class Cabin of an Aer Lingus 747 in the 1970s*"	Susanna Hoffs	Drew Massey, Colleen Smith, Victor Yerrid	January 11, 2016
Interview Question: What is the loudest thing you've ever heard? Improv: A humble man of Scotch-Irish descent overcomes poverty, prophecies, and squirrels to save his ancestral home in the first class cabin of a 747 in the 1970s. The airline: Aer Lingus.
43	"Pediatrician Waiting Room"	Emily V. Gordon	Annie Savage, Steve Agee, Mark McConville	January 18, 2016
Interview Question: If you could spend a week in any TV show, what would it be? Improv: Body swapping, workplace rivalries, and a boy stricken with Abdulajabbaris hurl the doctors into chaos in a Pediatrician Waiting Room.
44	"The One Beauty Parlor in a Small Town"	Dave Holmes	Jessica Chaffin, Craig Cackowski, Brandon Johnson	January 25, 2016
Interview Question: Would you rather live without electricity, or a toilet forever? Improv: Secret agents infiltrate a town to uncover the local donut-maker in the one beauty parlor in a small town.
45	"Margaritaville"	Jerry Minor	Hal Lublin, Michael Oosterom, Jean Villepique	February 1, 2016
Interview Question: What is your million-dollar idea? Improv: Invasive surgery and groundbreaking invention change the lives of a hapless trainee, his overbearing boss, and their forlorn customer in Margaritaville.
46	"Kay Jewelers in a Mall"	Alice Wetterlund	Gary Anthony Williams, Colleen Smith, Ted Michaels	February 8, 2016
Interview Question: Does everyone deserve to be heard? Improv: The mall provides a peaceful backdrop for political machinations and magical wishes at Kay Jewelers in a Mall.
47	"Pediatrician's Office"	Adam Sachs	Carla Cackowski, Craig Cackowski, Janet Varney	February 15, 2016
Interview Question: What about baseball? Improv: Religious ferver and soap opera knowledge push the patients into a quest for television stardom while visiting the Pediatrician's Office.
48	"Laundromat"	Judy Greer	Jessica Chaffin, Mark McConville, Annie Savage	February 22, 2016
Interview Question: What's a good New Years's resolution? Improv: A hapless employee and several local business owners endeavor to help a woman do her laundry while a bitter marital dispute erupts outside a barbecue-serving nail salon at Laundromat.
49	"Universal Studios Hollywood"	Cameron Esposito	Shulie Cowen, Brandon Johnson, Chris Tallman	February 29, 2016
Interview Question: How are eyeglasses made? Improv: Famous Universal mascots work with park security to find and stop an impostor character at Universal Studios Hollywood.
50	"Santa Fe Art Gallery"	Matt Besser	Craig Cackowski, Hal Lublin, Amanda Lund	March 7, 2016
Interview Question: Which person (any person) would make the best sibling? Improv: A Connecticut family joins forces with their children's imaginary demon friend to overcome the hurdles they encounter at a Santa Fe Art Gallery.
51	"Tesla Charging Station*"	Keegan-Michael Key†	Craig Cackowski, Chris Tallman, Jean Villepique	March 14, 2016
Interview Question: What is something you've considered telling one or both your parents but have not? Improv: A Tesla-owning couple hides a fugitive while their adopted daughter looks for love at a Tesla Charging Station.
52	"The Last Blockbuster Video Store"	Katie Dippold†	Mark McConville, Ted Michaels, Annie Savage	March 21, 2016
Interview Question: If you were to be a famous religious leader who would you be? Improv: A religious cult leader and his wives struggle with renting a movie from The Last Blockbuster Video Store.
53	"The Line for the Circular Saw in the Lumber Department of Home Depot"	Michael Penn	Stephanie Courtney, Michael Oosterom, Janet Varney	March 28, 2016
Interview Question: Do you toilet paper every toilet seat you use or is there a public toilet you wouldn't? Improv: A married couple looking to downgrade their house, a yo-yo enthusiast and a medium contemplate why the universe brought them all together in The Line for the Circular Saw in the Lumber Department of Home Depot.
54	"Inside that Salvador Dali Painting with the Melting Clocks"	Beth Stelling	Sarah Burns, Stephanie Courtney, Colleen Smith	April 4, 2016
Interview Question: What laws do you regularly break? Improv: A man deals with various spirits of a painting while a mother and daughter plot to rescue an egg salad sandwich all Inside that Salvador Dali Painting with the Melting Clocks.
55	"Land Rover"	Mary Holland†	Sarah Burns, Jean Villepique, Gary Anthony Williams	April 11, 2016
Interview Question: Was your parent's divorce your fault? Improv: A married couple is terrorized by street urchins after stumbling across a hermit that they found in their Land Rover.
56	"Los Feliz, Karen's House, 1997"	Margaret Cho	Carla Cackowski, Brandon Johnson, Chris Tallman	April 18, 2016
Interview Question: If you were going to get a tattoo in one hour, what would you get? Improv: A drunk group of friends read an ancient book of secrets in Los Feliz, Karen's House, 1997.
57	"Houston's Restaurant in Houston TX"	Retta	Maria Blasucci, Mark McConville, Colleen Smith	April 25, 2016
Interview Question: Why is the suit purple like this pen? Improv: A newlywed couple deals with an immortal being in a Houston's Restaurant in Houston TX.
58	"Rented Cabin in The Mountains"	Jason Mantzoukas†	Shulie Cowen, Matt Gourley, Amanda Lund	May 2, 2016
Interview Question: When was the last time you told your parents and siblings you loved them? Improv: A man struggles to impress his girlfriend's family while dealing with PTSD in a Rented Cabin in The Mountains.
59	"Call Center Christmas Party*"	Ron Funches†	Hal Lublin, Annie Savage, Janet Varney	May 9, 2016
Interview Question: Can you fix a bad kisser? Improv: A manager is visited by three Dickensian ghosts during a Call Center Christmas Party.
60	"Storm Drain*"	Jon Hamm†	Craig Cackowski, Matt Gourley, Janet Varney	May 16, 2016
Interview Question: What book influenced you most as a kid? Improv: Two kids and an old man go on a soul quest in a Storm Drain.
61	"A Suburban High School History Class on The First Day of Black History Month*"	Open Mike Eagle	Jordan Black, Nyima Funk, Daniele Gaither	May 23, 2016
Interview Question: Why the long face? Improv: Tensions rise when white teachers start getting more privileges than the black teachers at A Suburban High School History Class on The First Day of Black History Month.
62	"IKEA in Narnia*"	Jean Grae	Matt Gourley, Amanda Lund, Janet Varney	May 30, 2016
Interview Question: When's the last time you felt tricked? Improv: Two girls from different worlds switch places via a portal in an IKEA in Narnia.
63	"A Coffee Plantation in Bali*"	Kulap Vilaysack†	Drew Tarver, Mandell Maughan, Ryan Gaul, Tawny Newsome	June 6, 2016
Interview Question: Who would you kill first if murder was legal? Improv: Employees and customers work to uncover the truth of the mysterious owner of A Coffee Plantation in Bali.
64	"Knott's Scary Farm*"	Grant-Lee Phillips	Stephanie Courtney, Colleen Smith, Gary Anthony Williams	June 13, 2016
Interview Question: What existing superhero do you relate too? Improv: Two parents reveal a family secret to their daughter at Knott's Scary Farm.
65	"Televangelist's Studio"	Sam Richardson	Hal Lublin, Annie Savage, Victor Yerrid	June 20, 2016
Interview Question: Define magic. Improv: A preacher and his father/producer deal with the arrival of a new female intern at a Televangelist's Studio.
66	"Hamilton on Broadway"	Busy Philipps	Jordan Black, Mandell Maughan, Jean Villepique	June 27, 2016
Interview Question: If you met yourself as a child, would the child you honestly like the adult you? Improv: Two couples fight for tickets to Hamilton on Broadway.
67	"A Comic Book Shop"	Phil LaMarr†	Craig Cackowski, Nyima Funk, Marc Evan Jackson	July 4, 2016
Interview Question: What was the last item you donated to charity? Improv: A man waiting for his friend runs into an author promoting his book in A Comic Book Shop.
68	"Paris"	Nathan Lee Graham	Tawny Newsome, Matt Gourley, Maria Blasucci	July 11, 2016
Interview Question: What bad job of yours would you erase from your personal timeline? Improv: A group of actors argue who should play Juliet in an English production of Romeo and Juliet in Paris.
69	"Minnesota State Fair"	Cedric Yarbrough†	Colleen Smith, Little Janet Varney, Mark McConville	July 18, 2016
Interview Question: Data or data, how do you pronounce it and why? Improv: A couple helps a singing rat king escape his captors at the Minnesota State Fair.
70	"Gabrielle's Quinceanera"	Rachel Bloom†	Stephanie Courtney, Ryan Gaul, Gary Anthony Williams	July 25, 2016
Interview Question: What's your favorite Prince song? Improv: A couple enlists the help of a portable toilet delivery man to find their missing daughter before Gabrielle's Quinceanera.
71	"Summer Camp*"	Caitlin Howden†	Ryan Beil, Kevin Lee, Aaron Read, Taz Van Rassel	August 1, 2016
Interview Question: What was the singular childhood trauma that has defined you as an artist? Improv: An average camp rivals against a stuck up satanist camp across the lake at a Summer Camp.
72	"Airship Underwater*"	Robyn Hitchcock	Nyima Funk, Colleen Smith, Chris Tallman	August 8, 2016
Interview Question: What sport would you play if you had all the physical ability but no mental awareness? Improv: A crew desperately tries to get to the surface in their Airship Underwater.
73	"The King of Prussia Mall on Opening Weekend"	Kristian Bruun†	Carla Cackowski, Gary Anthony Williams, Jean Villepique	August 15, 2016
Interview Question: Whose hair would you like to find in your soup? Improv: A family deals with severe memory loss, marital infidelity and the desire to purchase a boy at The King of Prussia Mall on Opening Weekend.
74	"Cold Storage Facility at a Chicken Farm"	Anna Drezen and Nicole Silverberg	Annie Savage, Sarah Burns, Colleen Smith	August 22, 2016
Interview Question: What toy from your childhood do you miss the most, and if it broke, how? Improv: Workers discover sentient alien chickens in a Cold Storage Facility at a Chicken Farm.
75	"Aquarium"	Sean Clements† & Hayes Davenport†	None	August 29, 2016
Interview Question: What is the first thing you broke that wasn’t yours? Improv: A gift shop employee and a social media manager deal with a series of crises at an Aquarium.
76	"A Summer Theatre Camp in Michigan"	Nicole Parker†	Shulie Cowen, Mark McConville, Tawny Newsome	September 6, 2016
Interview Question: What kind of small business would you like to own? Improv: A group of kids fight for the leading role at A Summer Theatre Camp in Michigan.
77	"Concession Stand"	River Butcher	Chris Tallman, Jean Villepique, Brandon Johnson	September 12, 2016
Interview Question: What was the last dream you can remember, and why do you think you dreamed it? Improv: A quest for financial success, and a series questionable ingredients and choices cloud the lives of two workers at Concession Stand.
78	"Donut Factory*"	Desmin Borges†	Dan Ahdoot, Tim Baltz, Tawny Newsome	September 19, 2016
Interview Question: Who was your childhood hero? Are they still? Improv: Burgeoning love and strife between employee and customer leads to a journey of self-discovery at Donut Factory.
79	"Madrid*"	Fred Armisen	Craig Cackowski, Tawny Newsome, Little Janet Varney	September 26, 2016
Interview Question: Do you consider cheeseburgers to be a part of the sandwich family? Improv: Former lovers, former enemies and a vegan all come together in a jamón ibérico shop in Madrid.
80	"Warehouse"	Eugene Cordero†	Tim Baltz, Amanda Lund, Carla Cackowski	October 3, 2016
Interview Question: Did silent movies have to be pitched back in the twenties? Improv: A group of employees and a robotic phone race against the clock to move some boxes in a Warehouse.
81	"The Other Side of the Tracks*"	Craig Cackowski†	Nancy Hayden, Nyima Funk, Marc Evan Jackson	October 10, 2016
Interview Question: Do you still eat pudding as an adult? Improv: A real-estate developer tries to evict some homeless people from The Other Side of the Tracks.
82	"Madison Square Garden*"	Zach Gowen	Nyima Funk, Marc Evan Jackson, Marc Warzecha	October 17, 2016
Interview Question: It's 3am, you're up. What are you doing? Improv: Employees try to convince Mr. Madison to allow their workplace romance while he tries to open a new location at Madison Square Garden.
83	"Under a Big Rainstorm"	Janet Varney† & Jean Villepique†	None	October 24, 2016
Interview Question: What brings you fulfillment? Improv: Three strangers are trapped beneath a tarp, are late to a funeral, and live in fear of human-killing robots Under a Big Rainstorm.
84	"State Fair*"	Kumail Nanjiani	Jordan Black, Annie Savage, Jean Villepique	October 31, 2016
Interview Question: When did you first realize you didn't fit into society? Improv: Couples, employees and criminals alike clash over several reasons over several years at the State Fair.
85	"The Last Sizzler"	Jeb Lund	Stephanie Courtney, Maria Blasucci, Amanda Lund	November 7, 2016
Interview Question: If you could eat one fruit for the rest of your life, what would it be? Improv: A famous journalist sees the potential story of a lifetime when she meets a runaway from a famous criminal family in The Last Sizzler.
86	"A Whale's Belly"	Natalie Morales	Matt Gourley, Craig Cackowski, Colleen Smith	November 14, 2016
Interview Question: What's the most fun you've had in a hospital? Improv: Four stranded sailors exam their pasts to try and find a way out of a A Whale's Belly.
87	"Train Station*"	Horatio Sanz†	Ryan Gaul, Mandell Maughan, Drew Tarver	November 21, 2016
Interview Question: What is your sliding doors alternate career? Improv: Two inept CIA agents attempt to bust a stolen flower dealer in a Train Station.
88	"East NYC Village"	Oscar Nunez†	Craig Cackowski, Jean Villepique, Gary Anthony Williams	November 28, 2016
Interview Question: Why do you care about God? Improv: A former Clinton staffer tries to retrieve Bill's pen from a signless bagel shop in East NYC Village.
89	"Salem, Oregon Comic Shop"	Ron Funches	Jordan Black, Jeremy Carter, Jean Villepique	December 5, 2016
Interview Question: Where was the first slice of pizza you bought as a youngster? Improv: Fans and a creepy person alike flock to see famed comic book writer Rex Renner in a Salem, Oregon Comic Shop.
90	"The Childhood Home of Fred Rogers"	Kathryn Borel	Hal Lublin, Jennifer Marie Kelley, Mary Sohn	December 12, 2016
Interview Question: Who was your mentor getting into your profession? Improv: A young Fred is sent to live with his aunt and uncle's family because his parents kicked him out of The Childhood Home of Fred Rogers.
91	"A Fast Food Restaurant Kitchen In An Alternate Universe"	Maria Thayer	Stephanie Courtney, Colleen Smith, Chris Tallman	December 19, 2016
Interview Question: When did your parent or caregiver most hurt your feelings? Improv: A couple undercover inadvertently start a new religion in A Fast Food Restaurant Kitchen In An Alternate Universe.
92	"Boise, Idaho*"	Kulap Vilaysack & Howard Kremer	Dan Ahdoot, Tawny Newsome, Drew Tarver	December 26, 2016
Interview Question: What is the first joke you laughed at? Improv: Brother and sister look for a gift for their parent's anniversary on a potato farm in Boise, Idaho.
93	"Home Depot"	Nicole Parker†	Brandon Johnson, Amanda Lund, Mary Sohn	January 2, 2017
Interview Question: What was your first suit? Improv: Several different employees attempt to help a woman find a toilet in Home Depot.
94	"Art Gallery*"	Steven Yeun†	Shulie Cowen, Tawny Newsome, Chris Tallman	January 9, 2017
Interview Question: What day would you like to go back and re-live? PS: You can go back to change things? Improv: A struggling painter discovers amazing supernatural powers & learns life lessons at an Art Gallery.
95	"Backstage at a Rock Club*"	Rhett Miller	Chelsea Clarke, Shannon O'Neill, Gary Richardson	January 16, 2017
Interview Question: How did the movie The Sandlot effect your life? If you haven't seen it, what is the medical condition that prevented you? Improv: A band discusses how to sync their lucid dreams to improve their performances Backstage at a Rock Club.
96	"The Bellhouse*"	Nathan Lee Graham†	Chelsea Clarke, Shannon O'Neill, Gary Richardson	January 23, 2017
Interview Question: What's the song to which you lost your virginity? Improv: A family debates selling a mysterious Circuit City executive The Bellhouse.
97	"A Family-Owned Bagel Shop"	Cameron Esposito	Jeremy Carter, Colleen Smith, Gary Anthony Williams	January 30, 2017
Interview Question: What happens if the Supreme Court gets rid of Roe v. Wade? Improv: Business mogul/criminal Hank Thompsun attempts to enter a partnership with A Family-Owned Bagel Shop.
98	"A Post-Apocalyptic Wasteland"	Gary Anthony Williams†, Cedric Yarbrough†, Nyima Funk, Daniele Gaither†	None	February 6, 2017
Interview Question: Have you ever called 9-1-1 to help a stranger? Tell us why? Improv: A group of townspeople attempt to rise-up over their dueling presidents in A Post-Apocalyptic Wasteland.
99	"Ice Cream Parlor"	Craig Cackowski†	None	February 13, 2017
Interview Question: At this very moment, a health inspector is about to walk into your home. What rating would your kitchen receive? Improv: A drunken former minor league baseball player tells the story of his career to the bartender at an Ice Cream Parlor.
100	"A Shoe Store*"	Constance Wu	Sarah Burns, Marc Evan Jackson, Little Janet Varney	February 20, 2017
Interview Question: What sport or game could you kick my (PFT's) ass in? Improv: Employees sell shoes from another world to a woman with a foot fetish at A Shoe Store.
101	"Burmese Therapist Office*"	Busy Philipps	Eugene Cordero, Tawny Newsome, Little Janet Varney	February 27, 2017
Interview Question: Are you a bad girl? Are you? Are you? Improv: A group of rotating doctors help a confused fire department at a Burmese Therapist Office.
102	"The Red Carpet at the Oscars"	Merrin Dungey	Colleen Smith, Shaun Diston, Nyima Funk	March 6, 2017
Interview Question: What is the last great meal you ate and who did you eat it with and what did you talk about? Improv: A group of janitors try to convince Ryan Seacrest and his managers to have celebrities remove their shoes on The Red Carpet at the Oscars.
103	"The Break Room Of A Very Busy Quiznos"	Dave Holmes	Jean Villepique, Amanda Lund, Zeke Nicholson	March 13, 2017
Interview Question: What clubs were you in in high school? Improv: A committee works desperately to throw together a World's Fair whilst employees next door are overwhelmed in The Break Room Of A Very Busy Quiznos.
104	"A High-End Boxing Gym"	Andrew Ti	Jordan Black, Stephanie Courtney, Tawny Newsome	March 20, 2017
Interview Question: What do you do for exercise? Improv: The president sends in troops when she suspects people aren't following her presidential fitness program at A High-End Boxing Gym.
105	"Earwolf"	Kristen Schaal	Maria Blasucci, Tawny Newsome, Carl Tart	March 27, 2017
Interview Question: Have you ever been arrested? Improv: A dominating wife with a coyote and a guy with a wolf seek to get their animals trained at Earwolf.
106	"A Parallel Universe"	Tim Baltz†, Mandell Maughan†, Tawny Newsome†, Drew Tarver†	None	April 3, 2017
Interview Question: In an apocalypse, what will be the most valuable item to trade? Improv: A mysterious king looks for love on a singles blimp in a A Parallel Universe.
107	"An Interstellar Colony Ship"	Jeremy Carter†, Matt Gourley†, Mark McConville†	None	April 10, 2017
Interview Question: If you could remain one age for your entire life, what age would it be and why? Improv: Rookie, Cookie and Chookie find themselves as unwilling accomplices in a cocaine related time crime aboard An Interstellar Colony Ship.
108	"A Small Town Post Office After Hours"	Dan Lippert†, Jon Mackey†, Ryan Rosenberg†, Drew Tarver†	None	April 17, 2017
Interview Question: What food item have you consumed the most of in your lifetime? Improv: A group of mailmen discuss their personal problems with objects that have come to life in A Small Town Post Office After Hours.
109	"An Abandoned Puppet Theater"	Scott Aukerman†, Neil Campbell†, Jon Gabrus†, Mike Hanford†, Lauren Lapkus†	None	April 24, 2017
Interview Question: What's the most scared you've ever been? Improv: A group of former dorm mates meet up to earn their old RA's inheritance by spending the night in An Abandoned Puppet Theater.
110	"The Manager's Office of a Miniature Golf Course"	Tatiana Maslany†	Lauren Lapkus	May 1, 2017
Interview Question: What animals have you seen in the wild? Improv: Two employees receive the dressing down of a lifetime inside of The Manager's Office of a Miniature Golf Course.
111	"Panic Room"	Katy Colloton & Kate Barlow	Daniele Gaither, Jean Villepique, Carl Tart	May 8, 2017
Interview Question: What song do you always have stuck in your head? Improv: While evading a horde of zombies, four survivors get to know one another while slowly going mad inside of a Panic Room.
112	"Life Drawing Class"	Ted Leo†	Colleen Smith, Craig Cackowski, Jordan Black	May 15, 2017
Interview Question: When was the last time you cried out of happiness? Improv: Students and faculty alike become concerned over a professor's casting methods for a new model in Life Drawing Class.
113	"In the Green Room of a Local Morning Show"	Nicole Parker†	Mary Sohn, Amanda Lund, Maria Blasucci	May 22, 2017
Interview Question: Stipulating that there's nothing wrong with "here", if you could be anywhere else right now, where would that be? Improv: Cast and crew deal with unrequited love and name confusion In the Green Room of a Local Morning Show.
114	"Ice Cream Shop In the Winter"	Shannon Woodward	Sarah Burns, Nyima Funk, Rebecca Delgado Smith	May 29, 2017
Interview Question: What is the most embarrassed you've ever been? Improv: The pasts of the residents of a small, shady town come back to haunt them at an Ice Cream Shop In the Winter.
115	"Labyrinth"	Kristian Bruun†	Stephanie Courtney, Shaun Diston, Janet Varney	June 5, 2017
Interview Question: What was the worst encounter with a stranger you ever had? Improv: A group of eclectic strangers meet under widely varying circumstances when they are all lost in a Labyrinth.
116	"Backstage at the Grand Ole Opry"	Alison Brie†	Rebekka Johnson, Kimmy Gatewood, Jackie Tohn	June 12, 2017
Interview Question: What is the best or worst travel injury you've sustained? Improv: Love and deceit is in the air as an up and coming country music artist challenges the resident headliner Backstage at the Grand Ole Opry.
117	"Highway Clean Up"	Kumail Nanjiani & Emily V. Gordon	Dan Ahdoot, Tawny Newsome, Mano Agapion	June 19, 2017
Interview Question: When did you first learn what sex was, and how? Improv: Twins sentenced to community service learn a little more about their family than they would have liked during Highway Clean Up.
118	"A Covered Wagon Fording A River"	Ennis Esmer†	Jean Villepique, Chris Tallman, Josh Dean	June 26, 2017
Interview Question: When is the last time you vomited? Improv: A father, a suicidal mother, their adopted son and an encaged grandma encounter various issues including underwater mountain men whilst in A Covered Wagon Fording A River.
119	"A Forest"	Nicole Silverberg	Colleen Smith, Nyima Funk, Lilan Bowden	July 3, 2017
Interview Question: What ingredient would you remove from the world and why? Improv: A group of misfit kids meet an abused witch in A Forest.
120	"A Murder Mystery Dinner Party"	Sean Clements† & Hayes Davenport†	None	July 10, 2017
Interview Question: What is the first song you remember hating? Improv: A couple and their friend mostly argue over the difference between Murder Mystery Dinner Theater and A Murder Mystery Dinner Party.
121	"Karaoke Night at A Small Logging Town Tavern"	Scott Aukerman	Jordan Black, Jean Villepique, Hal Lublin	July 17, 2017
Interview Question: Tell me something your hometown is known for? Improv: One-armed twins celebrate their birthdays with some good friends at a Karaoke Night at A Small Logging Town Tavern.
122	"A Gas Station Only Stopped at During Road Trips"	Marc Evan Jackson†	None	July 24, 2017
Interview Question: Who was your best friend as a child and what would you do together? Improv: A stranger gives relationship advice to a man whose wife locked herself in A Gas Station Only Stopped at During Road Trip.
123	"Antarctic Research Station"	Marcella Arguello	Shaun Diston, Zeke Nicholson, Carl Tart	July 31, 2017
Interview Question: Which job from earlier in your life would you like to do again, and what would it have to pay? Improv: A walrus scientist gathers a group of chefs together to compete at an Antarctic Research Station.
124	"Jury Deliberations"	Ira Glass	Little Janet Varney, Jean Villepique, Craig Cackowski	August 7, 2017
Interview Question: What's a memory from your childhood you wish you could change? Improv: Gail (who's doing a great job) tries to get a decision from an eclectic group of jurors during Jury Deliberations.
125	"Casting Auditions for the New Haunted Hayride"	Alice Wetterlund†	Mandell Maughan, Annie Savage, Matt Gourley	August 14, 2017
Interview Question: At what point in your life did you feel your most 'hot' and most 'not'? Improv: A casting director has trouble letting go of the past, amidst numerous delays and fiascos at Casting Auditions for the new Haunted Hayride.
126	"Lobby of a 3-Star Hotel"	Janina Gavankar	Mandell Maughan, Tawny Newsome, Jeremy Carter	August 21, 2017
Interview Question: Is it racist to do an Italian accent? Improv: Robert Smith and his wife attempt a quest for treasure but are stalled by a group of nerdy kids and a pair of Italian criminals in a Lobby of a 3-Star Hotel.
127	"A River Boat on the Mississippi"	Maria Blasucci† & Amanda Lund†	None	August 28, 2017
Interview Question: What is your favourite font? Improv: A wealthy molasses baroness must protect her fortune from thieves on A River Boat on the Mississippi.
128	"A Mansion House"	Bryan Safi† & Erin Gibson†	Tim Baltz, Rebecca Delgado Smith, Amanda Lund	September 4, 2017
Interview Question: What time period do you think you belong in? Improv: A young man with a bizarre upbringing asks his girlfriend's father for his daughter's hand in marriage at their Mansion House.
129	"Whale Watching Boat"	Cameron Esposito & River Butcher	Eugene Cordero, Chris Tallman, Nicole Parker	September 11, 2017
Interview Question: What movie have you lied about seeing? Improv: A seasick newlywed couple meets the unconventional crew of a Whale Watching Boat.
130	"A Bank Heist"	Clea DuVall	Nicole Parker, Eugene Cordero, Janet Varney	September 18, 2017
Interview Question: How do you feel about your eye colour? Improv: A motley crew of tweens out for a legendary treasure cause all manner of chaos at A Bank Heist.
131	"Tommy Bahama"	Arden Myrin†	Maria Blasucci, Little Janet Varney, Steve Agee	September 25, 2017
Interview Question: When was the last time you pretended to know something? Improv: Unlikely romance sparks when old classmates try to find something to wear to their former teacher's funeral at a Tommy Bahama.
132	"Splash Mountain at Disneyland"	Aimee Mann	Jordan Black, Hal Lublin, Gary Anthony Williams	October 2, 2017
Interview Question: How many times have you googled yourself this week? Improv: Employees attempt to stop a man whose super absorbent shirt is stealing all the water from Splash Mountain at Disneyland.
133	"Water Cooler Area At An Office"	Mary Holland†	Colleen Smith, Carl Tart, Mano Agapion	October 9, 2017
Interview Question: What do you think is your finest quality? What do you think is your worst? Improv: A talking snake eats in a bathroom while employees discuss tv, home life and high school football around the Water Cooler Area At An Office.
134	"A Cast Reunion for the film The Net"	Jensen Karp	Colleen Smith, Carl Tart, Mano Agapion	October 16, 2017
Interview Question: Have you ever gotten lost? Improv: Confusion ensues as New jersey Nets player Richard Jefferson stumbles into A Cast Reunion for the film The Net.
135	"South Street Philadelphia"	Ana Ortiz	Carla Cackowski, Eugene Cordero, Ryan Gaul	October 23, 2017
Interview Question: At what moment have you felt the most adult? Improv: A rebellious boy joins a pair of male prostitutes that break into other's apartments on South Street Philadelphia.
136	"High School Reunion"	Busy Philipps	Ryan Gaul, Tawny Newsome, Sarah Burns	October 30, 2017
Interview Question: If you could only eat one type of cuisine for the rest of your life, what would it be? Improv: A dead student tries to tell her oblivious classmates that she is a ghost at their High School Reunion.
137	"Hardware Store"	Oscar Nunez†	Shulie Cowen, Matt Gourley	November 6, 2017
Interview Question: What is the best gift your parent ever gave you? Improv: Relationships get complicated when a regular customer trying to spice up her love life asks a new employee for help at a Hardware Store.
138	"A Haunted Hotel"	Hrishikesh Hirway†	Shaun Diston, Carl Tart, Ego Nwodim	November 13, 2017
Interview Question: Favorite author when you were a teen and why? Improv: A couple seeking free pizza encounter spooky activities when they split up in A Haunted Hotel.
139	"A Night Club in Chicago"	Jessica McKenna† & Zach Reino†	None	November 20, 2017
Interview Question: What flaw in your character has been most beneficial in your life? Improv: A forlorn lover heads to London to reunite with the one that got away, leaving behind A Night Club in Chicago.
140	"Family Owned Bike Shop"	Matt Besser†	Craig Cackowski, Little Janet Varney, Maya Deshmukh	November 27, 2017
Interview Question: What's your favorite ancient civilization, and why? Improv: A father comes to a head with his dark past while his daughter pursued her dream of being a diamond miner in a Family Owned Bike Shop.
141	"The Belly of a Whale"	Beth Newell & Sarah Pappalardo	Ryan Gaul, Amanda Lund, Jordan Black	December 4, 2017
Interview Question: Have you ever stolen anything? Improv: After a storm capsizes a tour boat a woman must fall in love if she and her companions hope to escape The Belly of a Whale.
142	"A Dance Club In Reykjavik"	Negin Farsad	Mark McConville, Nancy Hayden, Donna Brookbanks	December 11, 2017
Interview Question: Have you ever had a religious experience? Improv: A married couple and their child deals with Icelandic customs in A Dance Club In Reykjavik.
143	"Perry’s Nut House in Belfast, Maine"	John Hodgman†	Ego Nwodim, Jaime Moyer	December 18, 2017
Interview Question: Do you know your neighbors, or do you try avoid them and why? Improv: Two women need quick souvenirs from Perry’s Nut House in Belfast, Maine.
144	"Airport"	Craig Cackowski†, Mark Gagliardi†, Marc Evan Jackson†, Hal Lublin†, Annie Savage†, Little Janet Varney†	None	December 25, 2017
Interview Question: Choose one exotic pet: macaw, tortoise, boa or alpaca. You must choose. Improv: Cincinnati bound passengers become increasingly more agitated as their plane is repeatedly iced and de-iced all whilst at the Airport.
145	"Church Camp"	Joel Kim Booster	Matt Gourley, Colleen Smith, Rebecca Delgado Smith	January 1, 2018
Interview Question: Of all life's great firsts, which was your favorite? Improv: A man hitchhikes to Detroit to find his wife that he had previously believed had been stoned at Church Camp.
146	"A Corn Maze"	Kristian Bruun†	Matt Gourley, Chris Grace, Tawny Newsome	January 8, 2018
Interview Question: What movie universe would you most want to live in? Improv: Two pairs of visitors deal with shady sample vendors in A Corn Maze.
147	"Wisconsin Dells Water Park"	Maribeth Monroe†	Nancy Hayden, Jaime Moyer	January 15, 2018
Interview Question: What is your most embarrassing superstition? Improv: A couple on their honeymoon have a run in with an odd pair of owners of the Wisconsin Dells Water Park.
148	"Wisconsin*"	Erin Gloria Ryan	Eugene Cordero, Tawny Newsome, Little Janet Varney	January 21, 2018
Interview Question: Are you excited for the singularity or are you terrified? Improv: A pair of kids begin to suspect their adopted parents are robots and attempt to escape with their horses from their town in Wisconsin.
149	"Yngwie Malmstein Concert*"	David Rees	Eugene Cordero, Tawny Newsome, Little Janet Varney	January 28, 2018
Interview Question: Name three celebrities you would recruit to your post-apocalyptic survival team and why? Improv: A group of friends and Emeril Lagasse attempt to open a barbershop quartet themed restaurant during a zombie apocalypse and it started at an Yngwie Malmstein Concert.
150	"United Airlines Flight One Way LA To Duluth"	Nathan Lee Graham†	Shaun Diston, Carl Tart, Tawny Newsome	February 5, 2018
Interview Question: What's the best thing to find underwater? Improv: Flight attendants deal with a captain that's high, water breaches, passengers who aren't allowed in the destination and more on a United Airlines Flight One Way LA To Duluth.
151	"Schenectady, NY"	LeVar Burton	Zeke Nicholson, Ronnie Adrian, Laci Mosley	February 12, 2018
Interview Question: Lyft drivers: What do you think? Improv: A rocking horse manufacturer must cover for his wife when police start to suspect her of two unrelated crimes in Schenectady, NY.
152	"Civil War Reenactment"	Tawny Newsome†	None	February 19, 2018
Interview Question: How many eggs can you eat in one sitting? Improv: Hijinx and confusion ensue when business partners discovers that one of them has superpowers mere moments before their first Civil War Reenactment.
153	"LaCroix Factory"	Phil LaMarr†, Daniele Gaither†, Gary Anthony Williams†	None	February 26, 2018
Interview Question: What is your least favorite question strangers often ask you? Improv: Mr. LaCroix and his workers must do some quick problem solving when they run out of water at the LaCroix Factory.
154	"Baskin Robbins"	Tony Hale	Eugene Cordero, Tawny Newsome, Little Janet Varney	March 5, 2018
Interview Question: Would you invite yourself somewhere? Improv: A man with no money attempts to get ice-cream while a Never Ending Story themed wedding/funeral happens outside a Baskin Robbins.
154.5	"Baskin Robbins*"	Tony Hale	Eugene Cordero, Tawny Newsome, Little Janet Varney	March 7, 2018
Interview Question: Would you invite yourself somewhere? Improv: Employees and a loyal customer get suspicious of an odd looking young girl when she enters their Baskin Robbins. Special Note: This episode's audio was severely damaged. To remedy this Paul redid the episode with the same guest, improvisers and location and released that as episode 154. This one, being damaged, was still released but considered a "Bonus Episode."
155	"Olympic Opening Ceremonies 2018 PyeongChang South Korea"	Andy Daly†	Matt Gourley	March 12, 2018
Interview Question: What is a place that gives you immediate joy? Improv: The fate of the olympics changes when a Russian athlete tricks a French and a French-German athlete into doping right before the Olympic Opening Ceremonies 2018 PyeongChang South Korea.
156	"A Sunken Livering Room From A Multi-Camera TV Set"	Lauren Lapkus†, Mary Holland†, Erin Whitehead†, Stephanie Allynne†	None	March 19, 2018
Interview Question: It's 1967, you're in San Francisco: what are you up to? Improv: Turmoil breaks out after multiple deaths and incestuous revelations occur on A Sunken Livering Room From A Multi-Camera TV Set.
157	"Abandoned Farm House"	Eliza Skinner†	Mano Agapion, Zeke Nicholson, Betsy Sodaro	March 26, 2018
Interview Question: If you were going to commit a crime, what crime would you commit? Improv: A group of high schoolers encounter a misplaced ghost in an Abandoned Farm House.
158	"San Diego Airport"	Ryan Gaul†	Ronnie Adrian, Stephanie Courtney	April 2, 2018
Interview Question: What do you want someone to whisper in your ear? Improv: An Orlando bound couple helps a man whose bags were stolen by the TSA at the San Diego Airport.
159	"The Moon"	Jon Hamm	Maria Blasucci, Shaun Diston, Mark McConville	April 9, 2018
Interview Question: What is your biggest failure? Improv: Incompetence reigns as flight control can't decide if they want to rescue a chatty pair of astronauts from their mission to The Moon.
160	"Fish Taco Shack on the Beach"	Helen Hong	Laci Mosley, Ego Nwodim, Chris Grace	April 16, 2018
Interview Question: Why are you here? Improv: Two nonpedestrians are physically threatened by a couple of New Yorkers in line at a Fish Taco Shack on the Beach.
161	"Joe’s Crab Shack"	Utkarsh Ambudkar	Craig Cackowski, Colleen Smith, Edgar Momplaisir	April 23, 2018
Interview Question: If you were to name a star, what would the name be? Improv: An indecisive couple with some money to burn order ahead of father and his daughter while mayhem occurs in the kitchen of a Joe’s Crab Shack.
162	"LensCrafters"	Bryan Safi	Shaun Diston, Shulie Cowen, Colleen Smith	April 30, 2018
Interview Question: Which one of your family members reminds you most of Denzel Washington? Improv: A legally blind mind and a woman with a saggy elbow begin falling in love but keep getting harassed by an ablest employee in a LensCrafters.
163	"Grocery Store"	Natasha Rothwell†	Hal Lublin	May 7, 2018
Interview Question: What is a dream you've had that is actually interesting? Improv: An employee falls for an elderly lady but is interrupted by her murderous dog that she took to the Grocery Store.
164	"The Price is Right"	Allen Maldonado†	Nyima Funk, Maribeth Monroe, Jaime Moyer	May 14, 2018
Interview Question: What would you have your evil twin do, if you had an evil twin? Improv: Producers are captivated by a man's talent of suspense while his family is anxious for him outside of auditions for The Price is Right.
165	"Bubba Gump Shrimp Co. in Times Square New York City"	Nicole Byer†	Mary Sohn, Jean Villepique, Lyric Lewis	May 21, 2018
Interview Question: If the purge were real, who would you kill first? Improv: Sisters discover their ages aren't quite what they thought they were at a birthday celebration at Bubba Gump Shrimp Co. in Times Square New York City.
165.5	"Bonus: SF Sketchfest Tribute to Paul F. Tompkins"	N/a	N/a	May 28, 2018
Paul released this episode as a filler because he miscounted weeks and wanted pride month to start in June. The guests paying tribute to Paul are Matt Gourley, Ben Acker, River Butcher, John Hodgman, Eban Schletter and The Workjuice Players
166	"Coachella VIP"	Stephanie Beatriz	Ally Beardsley, Travis Coles, Kimia Behpoornia	June 4, 2018
Interview Question: Hi, hello, are you single, and will you date me? I'll make you so happy. Improv: The long-term effects of negging are put to the test, backstage at Coachella VIP.
167	"Downey, CA"	Drew Tarver†	None	June 11, 2018
Interview Question: What is a time in your childhood that you were at your happiest? Improv: Confusion and inconvenience occurs waiting for a train in Downey, CA.
168	"Parrot Jungle, A Parrot-Only Zoo in Miami, FL"	Natalie Morales	Mano Agapion, Jiavani Linayao, Oscar Montoya	June 18, 2018
Interview Question: Who was you favorite teacher? Improv: Students become wary of their teacher's abilities when he takes them to a Parrot Jungle, A Parrot-Only Zoo in Miami, FL.
169	"Akron, OH"	Cameron Esposito & River Butcher	Chad Westbrook, Ryan Barton, Chris Grace	June 25, 2018
Interview Question: If someone wrote a musical about your life, what would it be called and what would it be about? Improv: A couple starting their day with TV sets off a chai of crazy events in Akron, OH.
170	"A Craft Fair"	Caitlin Gill	Tony Rodriguez, Joan Ford, Steve Szlaga	June 27, 2018
Interview Question: What's a style concept that you've always wanted to try (mohawk, tattoo, piercing)? Improv: Two couples get feelings for one another at A Craft Fair.
171	"Palm Springs"	Veronica Osorio†	Amanda Lund, Shaun Diston, Matt Gourley	July 2, 2018
Interview Question: You can make a souvenir penny machine for any person, place, or thing - what would you make it for, and why? Improv: Not is all it seems when a couple checks into a hotel in Palm Springs.
172	"Portland, Oregon"	Erin Whitehead†	Edgar Momplaisir, Laci Mosley	July 9, 2018
Interview Question: If you were calming eating, say, a banana split, and you looked across the room and saw yourself from five minutes earlier, what you you do? Improv: A group of friends meet up for a secret reveal in Portland, Oregon.
173	"Backstage at an Adult Community Center Talent Show"	Kaitlin Olson	Carl Tart, Jean Villepique, Marc Evan Jackson	July 16, 2018
Interview Question: If your spirit animal were an animal you had met or seen, who would it be? Improv: A man who swaps places with his wife must quickly learn sword swallowing Backstage at an Adult Community Center Talent Show.
174	"Filthy Public Bathroom"	Roxane Gay	Ego Nwodim, Gary Anthony Williams, Maria Blasucci	July 23, 2018
Interview Question: If you were born the opposite sex, what would your name, personality, and occupation be? Improv: A new park employee must deal with a demon that preys on people in a Filthy Public Bathroom.
175	"Dallas"	Karthik Nemmani	Matt Gourley, Mark McConville	July 30, 2018
Interview Question: Do you pretend to like/read famous writers when they die? Improv: James Patterson swaps places with someone to get out of writing a book with Bill Clinton in Dallas.
176	"High School Graduation"	Sam Richardson†	Ally Beardsley, Ronnie Adrian, Carl Tart	August 6, 2018
Interview Question: Why are you here? Improv: Students deal with a variety of issues including pageant parents, blue collar jobs and commencement speakers at their High School Graduation.
177	"Inside the Mind of a Horny Housewife"	Calpernia Addams	Kimia Behpoornia, Maria Blasucci, Ronnie Adrian	August 13, 2018
Interview Question: What's your first memory? Improv: Sexual frustrations come to light when characters squabble Inside the Mind of a Horny Housewife.
178	"High School Auditorium"	Scott Thompson†	Colleen Smith, Chris Grace, Mano Agapion	August 20, 2018
Interview Question: What song do you put on when a hook up is coming over? Improv: An unconventional speaker stirs up drama with students and undercover agents in a High School Auditorium.
179	"Eudora, AR"	Jay Ellis	Gary Anthony Williams, Ryan Gaul, Jaime Moyer	August 27, 2018
Interview Question: What is the most romantic country in the world and why? Improv: A dysfunctional couple and their smart phone attempt to get help for their ailing pig in Eudora, AR.
180	"Reno, NV"	Kulap Vilaysack	Maribeth Monroe, Mano Agapion, Ify Nwadiwe	September 3, 2018
Interview Question: How many kangaroos are in the San Antonio zoo? Improv: A sick man and his partner attempt to recover a fortune cookie fortune in Reno, NV.
181	"San Diego Comic-Con*"	Ariell Johnson	Eugene Cordero, Tawny Newsome, Little Janet Varney	September 10, 2018
Interview Question: What was your first pet's name? Improv: A white couple wants to make friends with a diverse couple by taking them to San Diego Comic-Con.
182	"Germany*"	Kae Lani Palmisano	Eugene Cordero, Tawny Newsome, Little Janet Varney	September 17, 2018
Interview Question: What was your first job? Improv: Singing street surgeons fight to operate on a woman's knee caps in Germany.
183	"Winston-Salem, North Carolina"	Jackie Michele Johnson	Matt Gourley, Laci Mosley, Santina Muha	September 24, 2018
Interview Question: If you could start any conspiracy theory what would it be? Improv: Customers come into a pet shop to complain to the maybe manager about their pets being perverts in Winston-Salem, North Carolina.
184	"Amusement Park"	Kether Donohue†	Shaun Diston, Mandell Maughan, Carl Tart	October 1, 2018
Interview Question: You have full funding to recreate any album with you as the lead singer, what album do you choose? Improv: A man with a troubled past is told he doesn't need a ticket by the lady who works at the Amusement Park.
185	"In Line at a Delayed Lauryn Hill Concert*"	James Rigato	Eugene Cordero, Tawny Newsome, Little Janet Varney	October 8, 2018
Interview Question: Are there any recurring dreams that are significant to you? Improv: A career con artist messes with people In Line at a Delayed Lauryn Hill Concert.
186	"Hot Spring at a Discount Resort in Iceland*"	Christophe Zajac-Denek	Eugene Cordero, Tawny Newsome, Little Janet Varney	October 15, 2018
Interview Question: Worst first kiss? Improv: A struggling couple tries to solve the riddles of two sisters at a Hot Spring at a Discount Resort in Iceland.
187	"Pool In Palm Springs"	Trixie Mattel	Colleen Smith, Annie Savage, Oscar Montoya	October 21, 2018
Interview Question: When was the last time you were in a stream? Improv: A man's life changes after an encounter with a cryptozoological legend at a Pool In Palm Springs.
188	"A Train Platform*"	Starlee Kine	Tawny Newsome, Little Janet Varney	October 28, 2018
Interview Question: What is your relationship with God like? Improv: A woman has a Sliding Doors experience on A Train Platform.
189	"A Jiffy Lube Waiting Room"	Kara R. Brown	Jaime Moyer, Mary Sohn, Tim Baltz	November 5, 2018
Interview Question: Who is your secret crush right now? Improv: A woman with a herniated disc and her friend deal with relationship issues while waiting for their car's oil to be changed in a A Jiffy Lube Waiting Room.
190	"Target"	Jameela Jamil†	Maribeth Monroe, Marc Evan Jackson	November 12, 2018
Interview Question: Where do you plan to spend the apocalypse? Improv: TBD Target.
191	"Grandma’s Kitchen"	Vella Lovell	Kimia Behpoornia, Edgar Momplaisir, Carla Cackowski	November 19, 2018
Interview Question: Which celebrity would you like to die in the arms of? Improv: TBD Grandma’s Kitchen.
192	"Hospital Parking Lot"	Patti Harrison	Shulie Cowen, Chad Westbrook, Ify Nwadiwe	November 26, 2018
Interview Question: If you were a neighborhood in either Los Angeles or New York, which would be and why? Improv: TBD Hospital Parking Lot.
193	"1910s Home Being Renovated In Hudson River Valley"	Erin Gibson	Jordan Black, Stephanie Courtney, Gary Anthony Williams	December 3, 2018
Interview Question: If you could be killed by any weapon (not gun), what would it be and why?? Improv: TBD 1910s Home Being Renovated In Hudson River Valley.
194	"Parking Lot At A Phish Concert*"	Natalie Walker	Eugene Cordero, Tawny Newsome	December 10, 2018
Interview Question: How are you like your parents, good and bad? Improv: A man realizes his friends hate him when he meets a guru at a Parking Lot At A Phish Concert.
195	"Orlando, Florida*"	Matt Rogers	Eugene Cordero, Tawny Newsome	December 17, 2018
Interview Question: If you could go back in time and kill one person, who would it be? Improv: TBD Orlando, Florida.
196	"Inside the Organist’s Room at a Baseball Stadium"	Craig Cackowski†, Mark Gagliardi†, Marc Evan Jackson†, Hal Lublin, Annie Savage†, Little Janet Varney†	None	December 24, 2018
Interview Question: What is your favorite vacation destination? Improv: An organist and his elderly predecessor fight for their jobs on Christmas Eve Inside the Organist’s Room at a Baseball Stadium.
197	"A New Year’s Day Brunch at a Hotel Restaurant"	Dave Holmes	Laci Mosley, Oscar Montoya, Santina Muha	December 31, 2018
Interview Question: What was the last thing you did that made you feel like a kid? Improv: A group of friends help set up one of them with a troubled waiter at A New Year’s Day Brunch at a Hotel Restaurant.
198	"In a Magician’s Apartment"	Open Mike Eagle	Ally Beardsley, Chris Grace, Jacquis Neal	January 7, 2019
Interview Question: When was the most attractive you've ever felt? Improv: When a man arrives for a date he's surprised to see his date's mother there too In a Magician’s Apartment.
199	"The Jail Underneath Disneyland"	Eban Schletter	Sarah Burns, Nyima Funk, Victor Yerrid	January 14, 2019
Interview Question: What is the most uncomfortable place you have sneezed? Improv: A mom arrested for sneezing meets a lifer in The Jail Underneath Disneyland.
200	"Charleston, South Carolina"	Busy Philipps	Maria Blasucci, Craig Cackowski, Eugene Cordero, Shaun Diston, Amanda Lund, Tawny Newsome, Colleen Smith, Carl Tart, Little Janet Varney, Jean Villepique	January 21, 2019
Interview Question: If you could make a themed restaurant, what would it be? Improv: A contraption-building gentleman haunted by ghosts searches for a way home from Charleston, South Carolina.

† signifies that the guest participated in the improv bit of the show.

(*) denotes that the episode was recorded in front of a live audience.

=== Improv players ===
- Janet Varney (36 episodes)
- Colleen Smith (30 episodes)
- Tawny Newsome (29 episodes)
- Craig Cackowski (28 episodes)
- Jean Villepique (27 episodes)
- Matt Gourley (24 episodes)
- Chris Tallman (20 episodes)
- Marc Evan Jackson (18 episodes)
- Amanda Lund (18 episodes)
- Mark McConville (17 episodes)
- Eugene Cordero (16 episodes)
- Hal Lublin (15 episodes)
- Maria Blasucci (14 episodes)
- Annie Savage (14 episodes)
- Sarah Burns (13 episodes)
- Gary Anthony Williams (13 episodes)
- Stephanie Courtney (11 episodes)
- Shulie Cowen (11 episodes)
- Nyima Funk (11 episodes)
- Carl Tart (11 episodes)
- Jordan Black (10 episodes)
- Shaun Diston (10 episodes)
- Mano Agapion (8 episodes)
- Ryan Gaul (8 episodes)
- Carla Cackowski (7 episodes)
- Mandell Maughan (7 episodes)
- Jeremy Carter (6 episodes)
- Jessica Chaffin (6 episodes)
- Chris Grace (6 episodes)
- Drew Tarver (6 episodes)
- Victor Yerrid (6 episodes)
- Tim Baltz (5 episodes)
- Brandon Johnson (5 episodes)
- Laci Mosley (5 episodes)
- Jaime Moyer (5 episodes)
- Nicole Parker (5 episodes)
- Mary Sohn (5 episodes)
- Ronnie Adrian (4 episodes)
- Daniele Gaither (4 episodes)
- Lauren Lapkus (4 episodes)
- Maribeth Monroe (4 episodes)
- Zeke Nicholson (4 episodes)
- Ego Nwodim (4 episodes)
- Michael Oosterom (4 episodes)
- Steve Agee (3 episodes)
- Dan Ahdoot (3 episodes)
- Ally Beardsley (3 episodes)
- Kimia Behpoornia (3 episodes)
- Kristian Bruun (3 episodes)
- Mark Gagliardi (3 episodes)
- Nancy Hayden (3 episodes)
- Mary Holland (3 episodes)
- Drew Massey (3 episodes)
- Ted Michaels (3 episodes)
- Edgar Momplaisir (3 episodes)
- Oscar Montoya (3 episodes)
- Rebecca Delgado Smith (3 episodes)
- Scott Aukerman (2 episodes)
- James Bladon (2 episodes)
- Chelsea Clarke (2 episodes)
- Sean Clements (2 episodes)
- Andy Daly (2 episodes)
- Hayes Davenport (2 episodes)
- Nathan Lee Graham (2 episodes)
- Erinn Hayes (2 episodes)
- Phil LaMarr (2 episodes)
- Santina Muha (2 episodes)
- Oscar Nunez (2 episodes)
- Ify Nwadiwe (2 episodes)
- Shannon O'Neill (2 episodes)
- Gary Richardson (2 episodes)
- Eliza Skinner (2 episodes)
- Chad Westbrook (2 episodes)
- Erin Whitehead (2 episodes)
- Cedric Yarbrough (2 episodes)
- Stephanie Allynne (1 episode)
- Ryan Barton (1 episode)
- Tim Batt (1 episode)
- Ryan Beil (1 episode)
- Matt Besser (1 episode)
- Rachel Bloom (1 episode)
- Lilan Bowden (1 episode)
- Desmin Borges (1 episode)
- Alison Brie (1 episode)
- Donna Brookbanks (1 episode)
- Nicole Byer (1 episode)
- Neil Campbell (1 episode)
- Travis Coles (1 episode)
- Bob Dassie (1 episode)
- Josh Dean (1 episode)
- Maya Deshmukh (1 episode)
- Katie Dippold (1 episode)
- Ennis Esmer (1 episode)
- Joan Ford (1 episode)
- Ron Funches (1 episode)
- Jon Gabrus (1 episode)
- Kimmy Gatewood (1 episode)
- Erin Gibson (1 episode)
- Jon Hamm (1 episode)
- Mike Hanford (1 episode)
- Hrishikesh Hirway (1 episode)
- John Hodgman (1 episode)
- Caitlin Howden (1 episode)
- Jameela Jamil (1 episode)
- Rebekka Johnson (1 episode)
- Jennifer Marie Kelley (1 episode)
- Keegan-Michael Key (1 episode)
- Kevin Lee (1 episode)
- Thomas Lennon (1 episode)
- Ted Leo (1 episode)
- Lyric Lewis (1 episode)
- Jiavani Linayao (1 episode)
- Dan Lippert (1 episode)
- Jon Mackey (1 episode)
- Allen Maldonado (1 episode)
- Jason Mantzoukas (1 episode)
- Tatiana Maslany (1 episode)
- Jessica McKenna (1 episode)
- Guy Montgomery (1 episode)
- Arden Myrin (1 episode)
- Jacquis Neal (1 episode)
- Veronica Osorio (1 episode)
- Jim Rash (1 episode)
- Taz Van Rassel (1 episode)
- Aaron Read (1 episode)
- Zach Reino (1 episode)
- Sam Richardson (1 episode)
- Tony Rodriguez (1 episode)
- Ryan Rosenberg (1 episode)
- Bryan Safi (1 episode)
- Horatio Sanz (1 episode)
- Paul Scheer (1 episode)
- Steve Szlaga (1 episode)
- Betsy Sodaro (1 episode)
- Rich Talarico (1 episode)
- Scott Thompson (1 episode)
- Jackie Tohn (1 episode)
- Kulap Vilaysack (1 episode)
- Marc Warzecha (1 episode)
- Derek Waters (1 episode)
- Alice Wetterlund (1 episode)
- Steven Yeun (1 episode)

== Recognition ==
The podcast has been listed on several "Best Of" lists for podcasts in 2015. The show was included in Apple's collection of "The Best Podcasts of 2015. Paste magazine placed Spontaneanation in the fifth spot on their list of The 10 Best Comedy Podcasts of 2015, referring to it as "both an illuminating chat show and a strong argument in favor of the often-maligned artform of improv comedy." "A Theme Park Break Room" was included on Vulture's list of the Best Comedy Podcast Episodes of 2015, referring to it as "what was easily one of the most wildly funny podcasts of 2015."
