= Dan Ahdoot =

American actor, writer, and comedian

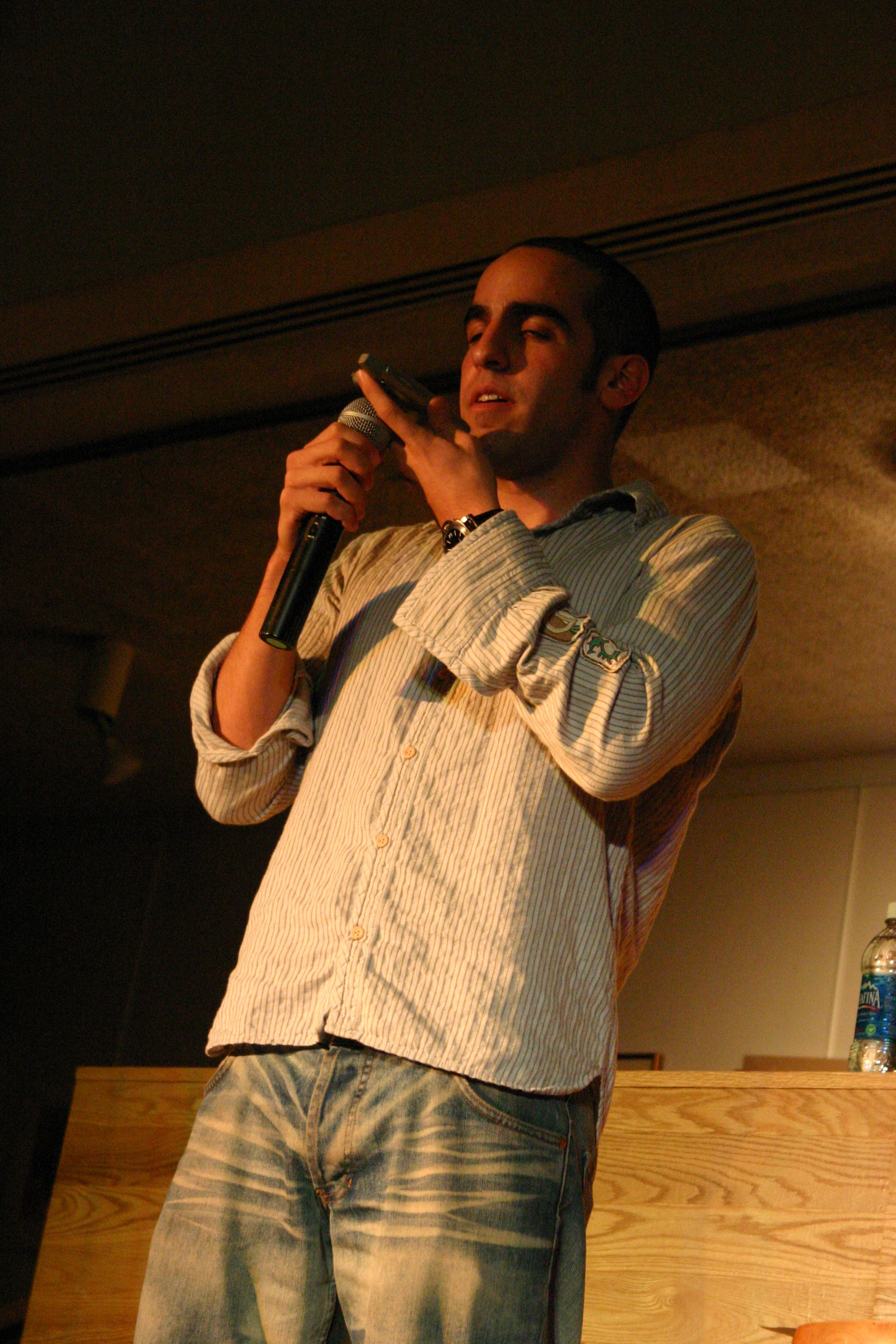
- Born: Dan Kamyar Ahdoot; Great Neck, New York, U.S.
- Education: Johns Hopkins University (BS)
- Occupations: Comedian; Actor; Writer; Producer
- Height: 5 ft 7 in (170 cm)

Dan Kamyar Ahdoot (Persian: دن احدوت; Hebrew: דן אחדות) is an American actor, writer, and comedian. He is known for his TV appearances on Netflix's Cobra Kai, Disney's Kickin' It, Showtime's Shameless, and the Seeso series Bajillion Dollar Propertie$. He has also developed TV shows for CBS, Fox, Hulu, Freeform, and Pop.

== Early life ==
Ahdoot was born to an observant Iranian Jewish family in Great Neck, New York. His family comes from Isfahan, with his father coming to the US via Israel. Speaking on his upbringing, he said: "I grew up in Great Neck, New York, which is actually a hotbed of Iranian Persian Jewry, so I didn't really know that I was very different until I went to college." His family kept kosher at home and attended synagogue on Saturdays for Shabbat which his family got together. Although he described his beliefs as agnostic, he identifies as culturally Jewish. He completed pre-med studies at Johns Hopkins University, and was accepted into medical school, but ultimately decided to pursue stand-up comedy instead.

== Career ==
Ahdoot has developed television shows for CBS, FOX, Hulu, Freeform, and Pop! He has also written for various Comedy Central Roasts.

Ahdoot is best known for his work on the series Bajillion Dollar Propertie$ where he played the ruthless real estate agent Amir Yaghoob. He has also acted on Showtime's Shameless, ABC's Super Fun Night, and Falafel Phil on the Disney XD show Kickin' It. Ahdoot was also in an episode of Workaholics playing a worker at a computer store.

Ahdoot performs regularly at the Laugh Factory in Hollywood, and is a national headlining comedian. He has performed on The Tonight Show, NBC's Last Comic Standing, Last Call with Carson Daly, and Comedy Central's Premium Blend.

Ahdoot is the host of the food podcast Green Eggs and Dan. He has been a guest on Spontaneanation with Paul F. Tompkins and Comedy Bang! Bang! with Scott Aukerman.

== Filmography ==
=== Film ===
| Year | Title | Role | Notes |
|---|---|---|---|
| 2007 | Twisted Fortune | Hrundi Bakshi Jr. | |
| 2015 | Woke Up Famous | Coffee Shop Waiter | Short film |
| 2016 | Jimmy Vestvood: Amerikan Hero | Stoner Dan | |
| 2023 | The Donor Party | MJ | |
| 2025 | The Cobra Kai Movie Part II | Himself | Short film |

=== Television ===
| Year | Title | Role | Notes |
|---|---|---|---|
| 2006 | AV Club | Saddam | TV movie |
| 2011 | Workaholics | Genius | Episode: "Model Kombat" |
| 2011–2015 | Kickin' It | Philip ''Falafel Phil'' Juan Rivera | Recurring role |
| 2012 | Friend Me | Farhad | Unaired series |
| 2012 | Virgin Produced: Comedy Vault | Comedian | TV movie |
| 2013 | Wendell & Vinnie | Randall | 2 episodes |
| 2013 | Ghost Ghirls | Yung Skeevy | Episode: "Spirits of '76: Part 1" |
| 2013–2014 | Super Fun Night | Ruby | 7 episodes |
| 2013–2016 | Your Pretty Face Is Going to Hell | Kamal | 4 episodes |
| 2015 | Why? with Hannibal Buress | French Zombie | Episode #1.8 |
| 2016 | Mary + Jane | Robbie | Episode: "Pilot" |
| 2016 | WTH: Welcome to Howler | Dean Hopper | 3 episodes |
| 2016 | Comedy Bang! Bang! | Doctor | Episode: "Kaley Cuoco Wears a Black Blazer and Slip on Sneakers" |
| 2016–2019 | Bajillion Dollar Propertie$ | Amir Yaghoob | Main role |
| 2017 | Atypical | Smooth Guy | Episode: "Antarctica" |
| 2017 | Ghosted | Terry | Episode: "Sam" |
| 2018–2025 | Cobra Kai | Anoush Norouzi | Recurring role |
| 2019 | Shameless | Realtor | Episode: "The Apple Doesn't Fall Far From the Alibi" |
| 2021 | The Crew | Amir Lajani | Main role |
| 2022 | Raid The Fridge | Himself | Host |
| 2022 | Is It Cake? | Judge | Netflix |
| 2026 | It's Always Sunny in Philadelphia | Mitch | Episode: "The War on Alcohol" |

== Discography ==
- hate me, or HATE ME (2006)
