= Mandell Maughan =

American actress

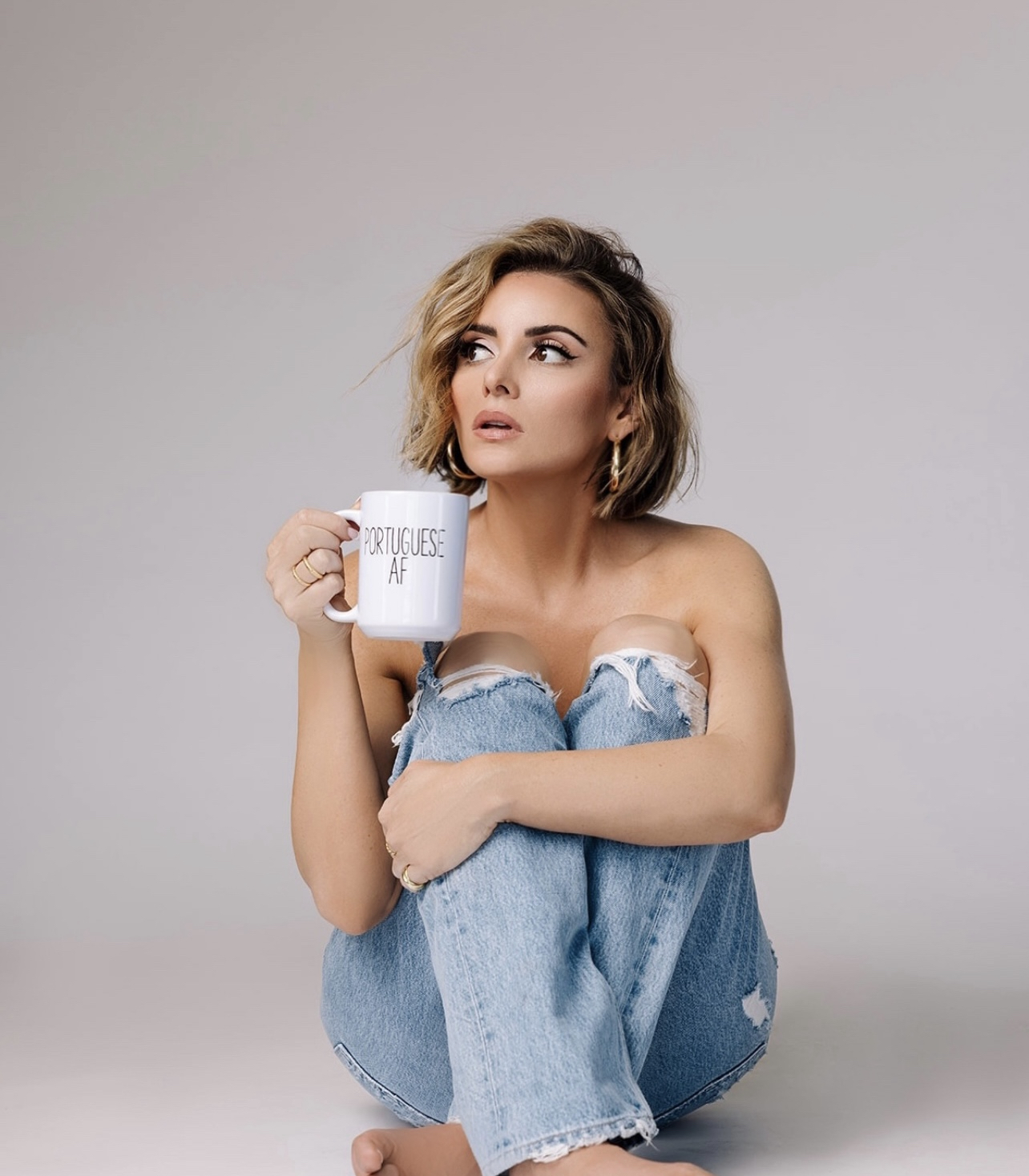
- Education: University of Arizona
- Occupation: Actress
- Years active: 2001–present
- Known for: Free Bert, Resident Alien, Bajillion Dollar Propertie$

Mandell Maughan is an American film and television actress. She is best known for starring as Chanel Vanderthal on the Netflix series Free Bert, Maggie in Me, Myself & I on CBS and Lisa Casper in Resident Alien on Syfy. She also played Victoria King, for four seasons, in the comedy fan favorite Bajillion Dollar Propertie$.

== Early life ==
Maughan, a Portuguese American, was born and raised in Point Loma, a peninsula within southern California, often referred to as "Little Portugal". In 2001, Mandell won the title of Miss Cabrillo, a community pageant where women of Portuguese decent compete to represent their heritage. Later, Maughan attended The University of Arizona and received a Bachelor of Fine Arts in Professional Acting from the Arizona Repertory Theatre program.

== Career ==
Maughan began her career starring in the title role of the Prison Break spin-off series, Prison Break: Proof of Innocence. She then appeared in the cult film Midnight Movie and several television shows including Ghost Whisperer, House of Lies, and Undateable.

Maughan is best known for starring as Victoria King in the reality show spoof, Bajillion Dollar Propertie$. Shortly after, she played Maggie in the CBS comedy Me, Myself and I with Bobby Moynihan, Jack Dylan Grazer and John Laroquette. Following, Maughan starred as Lisa Casper in the Syfy thriller, Resident Alien based on the comic book of the same name. Throughout this time, she made appearances in the Netflix film Between Two Ferns and the Netflix series Grace and Frankie.

Maughan has acted in over 100 episodes of television including Black-ish, The Neighborhood and the Showtime drama The Affair.

In addition to film and television, Maughan has made comedic appearances in podcasts such as Comedy Bang! Bang! with Scott Aukerman and Spontaneanation with Paul F. Tompkins. She has also performed live at Upright Citizens Brigade Theatre, The Second City and IO Theater. She is currently co-authoring a book, with her father, about his fishing adventures at sea as a Portuguese Master Captain.

== Filmography ==
Film
Year	Title	Role	Notes
2008	Midnight Movie	Samantha	
2019	Between Two Ferns: The Movie	Nic Jeffries	

Television
Year	Title	Role	Notes
2005	The Playbook	Potential Girlfriend	Episode: "Gaming and Taming Technology"
2006	Prison Break: Proof of Innocence	Amber McCall	26 episodes
2008	The Young and the Restless	Lynsey	2 episodes
2008	Ghost Whisperer	Patsy	Episode: "Break Room"
2008	Man Stroke Woman	Various Characters	TV movie
2008	Do Not Disturb	Allie	Episode: "Break Room"
2009	Life	Ziggy	Episode: "Evil... and His Brother Ziggy"
2009	The Ex List	Samantha	Episode: "Flower King"
2009	Single White Millionaire	Attractive Girl	TV movie
2012	Save the Supers	Elementra	7 episodes
2013	Sean Saves the World	Donna	Episode: "Sean Comes Clean"
2014	The Millers	Waitress	Episode: "You Are the Wind Beneath My Wings, Man"
2015	House of Lies	Stacy	Episode: "Trust Me, I'm Getting Plenty of Erections"
2015	Undateable	Erica	Episode: "A Japanese Businessman Walks Into a Bar"
2016	Comedy Bang! Bang!	Mallory	Episode: "Krysten Ritter Wears a Turtleneck and Black Boots"
2016–2019	Bajillion Dollar Propertie$	Victoria King	34 episodes
2017–2018	Me, Myself & I	Maggie	13 episodes
2018	The Neighborhood	Lyndsey	Episode: "Welcome to the Fundraiser"
2019	Black-ish	Amy Copeland	Episode: "Is It Desert or Dessert?"
2019	The Affair	Cashawn	Episode: "501"
2020	Grace and Frankie	Cassidy	Episode: "The Confessions"
2021–2022	Resident Alien	Lisa Casper	11 episodes
2026-	Free Bert	Chanel Vanderthal	6 episodes

== Awards and nominations ==
Year	Award	Category	Result
2001	The Cabrillo Festival	Miss Cabrillo	Won
