= Me, Myself & I (TV series) =

2017 comedy series

- Genre: Sitcom
- Created by: Dan Kopelman
- Starring: Bobby Moynihan; Jack Dylan Grazer; Brian Unger; Jaleel White; Kelen Coleman; Mandell Maughan; Christopher Paul Richards; Reylynn Caster; Skylar Gray; Sharon Lawrence; John Larroquette
- Composer: Siddhartha Khosla
- Country of origin: United States
- No. of seasons: 1
- No. of episodes: 13

Production
- Executive producers: Dan Kopelman; Aaron Kaplan; Dana Honor; Randall Einhorn
- Camera setup: Single-camera
- Running time: 22 minutes
- Production companies: Melon Entertainment; Kapital Entertainment; Warner Bros. Television

Original release
- Network: CBS
- Release: September 25, 2017 – July 21, 2018

Me, Myself & I is an American television sitcom created by Dan Kopelman that aired on CBS. The series starred Bobby Moynihan, Jack Dylan Grazer, John Larroquette, Brian Unger, Jaleel White, Kelen Coleman, Mandell Maughan, Christopher Paul Richards, Reylynn Caster, and Skylar Gray.

The series premiered on September 25, 2017. It was pulled from CBS's lineup after the first six episodes ranked last in the ratings among the network's Monday-night sitcom lineup. It was the first network television cancellation of the 2017–18 television season. The show was not renewed for a second season, and the remaining episodes of the series were burned off during the summer of 2018, concluding on July 21, 2018.

== Premise ==
The show follows three points of the life of Alex Riley, an inventor, businessman, and Chicago Bulls fan. The first point shows Riley as a 14-year-old (portrayed by Jack Dylan Grazer) who moves with his mother to Los Angeles in 1991 to live with his new stepfather and stepbrother. The next point portrays him as a 40-year-old dealing with the breakup of his marriage and being a single father in the present day, while trying to navigate his way out of "inventor's block" (portrayed by Bobby Moynihan). Last, Alex Riley is depicted as a 65-year-old in 2042 who has just retired from his immensely successful company and reconnected with his childhood love (portrayed by John Larroquette).

== Cast and characters ==
- Bobby Moynihan as Alexander "Alex" Riley (present), an inventor recalling three stages of his life. He lives with his best friend after a divorce from his wife, and soon learns his wife wants to move away with their daughter, Abby.
  - Jack Dylan Grazer as Alexander "Alex" Riley (past), a middle school student who spends much of his free time inventing. He must adjust after moving in with his new stepdad and stepbrother. He crushes on Nori, whom he meets at his new school.
  - John Larroquette as Alexander "Alex" Riley (future), the billionaire owner of the major company Riley Industries, who is now retiring. He reconnects with his old crush Nori.
- Brian Unger as Ron (past and present), Alex's stepfather
- Jaleel White as Darryl (present), Alex's childhood friend and business partner who lets Alex live in his garage after Alex's divorce
  - Alkoya Brunson as Darryl (past)
  - Tim Reid as Darryl (future)
- Kelen Coleman as Abby Riley (future), Alex's daughter with Sarah. She is the general manager of the Chicago Bulls.
  - Skylar Gray as Abby Riley (present)
- Mandell Maughan as Maggie Riley (past and present), Alex's mother
- Christopher Paul Richards as Justin (past), Alex's stepbrother
  - Ryan Hansen as Justin (present)
  - Ed Begley Jr. as Justin (future), the Governor of California
- Reylynn Caster as Eleanor "Nori" Sterling (past), young Alex's crush who deals with having rumors spread about her. She has a crush on Alex.
  - Sharon Lawrence as Eleanor Sterling (future), the owner of a diner
- Ella Thomas as Jasmine (future), future Alex's CFO and Darryl's daughter
  - Mandeiya Flory as Jasmine (present)
- Justin Stella as Phillip "Phil" Ricozzi (past), Alex's childhood nemesis who dated Nori
  - Stephen Rannazzisi as Phillip "Phil" Ricozzi (present)

== Production ==
On May 12, 2017, the show was ordered to series. The series premiered September 25, 2017, on CBS and was given a thirteen episode order. On November 1, 2017, CBS pulled the series from the schedule after six low-rated episodes, leaving seven episodes unaired, and announced that the series will remain in production for all thirteen episodes and would return to the schedule at a later date. On May 12, 2018, Me, Myself & I was cancelled after one season. On June 7, 2018, it was announced that the show would return to the schedule on July 7, 2018 and the remaining seven episodes would air over a three-week period. The final episode aired on July 21, 2018.

== Episodes ==
No.	Title	Directed by	Written by	Original release date	Prod. code	U.S. viewers (millions)
1	"Pilot"	Randall Einhorn	Dan Kopelman	September 25, 2017	T11.10111	7.46
Past Alex, who is a major Chicago Bulls fan, is forced to move in with his mother's new husband and meets his new stepbrother, Justin, who both live in "Lakers country." He soon starts at his new school and meets Nori. Immediately smitten, Justin makes plans for Alex to kiss her at the school dance. Alex chokes on a mint that Justin forces on him, leading to disastrous consequences. Present Alex has divorced his wife, Sarah, because she cheated on him. However, Sarah now wants to move 400 miles away with her new husband and bring along Abby, Alex and Sarah's daughter. Future Alex (after a heart attack) reveals to his company that he is retiring and later bumps into the future Nori at a diner she owns. They kiss and he calls her the love of his life.
2	"The First Step"	Todd Holland	Dan Kopelman	October 2, 2017	T12.15802	5.15
Past Alex is having trouble with his seating at lunch, as his fiasco at the dance has given him the nickname "Chokey." He then gets invited to sit with "the Ramps," a group of popular kids that sit higher than everyone else. He gains popularity, but learns that Justin paid one of the popular kids to invite Alex to sit there. Amidst this, Alex leads Nori to break up with her boyfriend because of his commitment problems. The next day, he gets invited to sit with the Ramps again, but declines and sits with the table of "losers." He tells them they should stand up to the lunch rules and leads them towards the Ramps. He slips in the process and kids start calling him Trippy. He befriends one of the other "loser" kids whose real name is Darryl, revealing that the two met in middle school. Present Alex finally leaves the house, led by Darryl, and tries to find a girl to date. The plan fails and they end up at Corky's, where Alex meets a girl named Lauren and they both share a love of waffles. They go on a date but, Alex, overwhelmed by his recent divorce, leaves before Lauren can finish writing her address on his hand. Future Alex sets up a date with Nori, but learns that she has a boyfriend. The next day, while he is driving with Abby, Nori sends him a video message to meet at Corky's. Nori reveals that her boyfriend has proposed to her and she has said yes. Alex, who had hoped she broke up with him, is crushed.
3	"The Card"	Todd Holland	Joe Port & Joe Wiseman	October 9, 2017	T12.15803	4.33
Past Alex, for his fourteenth birthday, is given a card of and signed by Michael Jordan by Ron, but panics when speaking to Nori and impulsively gives it to her. With help from Justin, who forges the same signature on another card, they attempt to sneak into Nori's house and swap the cards. While they escape undetected, they are left unsure whether or not they got the real card or still have the copy. Present Alex is celebrating his birthday with Abby when he encounters the parents of some of Abby's friends, who inform him of a very expensive camping trip his daughter wants to attend. With no other way to get the money, Alex sells the Michael Jordan card, happy to find that it was the real one all along. Future Alex, after spending his birthday alone due to everyone seemingly being busy, is happy when Abby and Justin, now a governor, come to celebrate. Abby reveals that Ron told her about how he sold the card and gives him another card just like it.
4	"Star Wars"	John Fortenberry	Bob Kushell	October 16, 2017	T12.15804	4.28
Past Alex is angry due to being forbidden to see a midnight screening of Star Wars at the local movie theatre. He convinces Justin to sneak out and see it but, after the movie, they are picked up by Ron. However, after a heart to heart talk in the car, Ron lies to Maggie that he took them to see Star Wars. Present Alex, having been counting down the days until he can show it to her at the exact same age as he was when he saw it, is disappointed when Abby tells him Ron already showed her Star Wars. Angry at first, Alex eventually forgives Ron before becoming ecstatic when he learns that he only showed Abby the first installment of the prequel trilogy. However, after seeing that she isn't enjoying it, Alex puts on a movie she likes and simply enjoys spending time with her. Future Alex, having dreamed about it since he first saw Star Wars, is excited to finally get the opportunity to travel to space. But, when it rains and prevents him from going, he instead spends his day with Nori, helping cook food at her diner. However, when he finds out that he can still make the trip into space, he passes up on it to spend more time with Nori.
5	"Family Tree"	Matt Sohn	Craig Gerard & Matthew Zinman	October 23, 2017	T12.15806	4.65
Past Alex is horrified and angry to learn that he has to miss out on seeing a meteor shower to spend time with Ron's extended family. Eventually, he runs out, sick of all the attention and not willing to participate in a surprise talent show. However, after Maggie reveals that Ron got him a telescope for after his extended family left, Alex happily takes part in the talent show. Abby, after learning from Ron that he is present Alex's stepdad, becomes determined to meet her biological grandfather. This forces Alex to track him down for the first time in his life and they travel to meet his dad but, when they arrive, Abby changes her mind due to realizing that, like Alex, she doesn't want to know a complete stranger. Future Alex, after learning that Abby has a new boyfriend, convinces her to let them meet under the promise he won't instantly dislike him. However, this leads to Abby picking up on her boyfriend's frequent use of the word "magnificent" and breaking up with him.
6	"New Job"	Jim Hensz	Lauren Pomerantz	October 30, 2017	T12.15805	3.91
Past Alex, determined to win a contest with his invention, ends up receiving help from Darryl on how to pitch the idea upon being told he isn't good at it. Alex wins using Darryl's pitch, but refuses to acknowledge how much Darryl helped with his advice. However, with help from his family, Alex apologises to Darryl and they decide to become partners, putting the award from the contest in Ron's time capsule. Present Alex is offered a new job by potential buyers, but it would require ending his partnership with Darryl. The two decide to go their separate ways, but Alex comes to realize how much he loved working with Darryl and, after digging up the time capsule and getting the award back to give to his friend, the two become partners again. In the future, Darryl is annoyed by how Alex is still interested in Eleanor. When he learns that Alex is considering giving Eleanor's boyfriend bad advice for a gift, he convinces him not to and later helps him join a dating site.
7	"Field Trip"	Steve Pink	Richard Brandon Manus	July 7, 2018	T12.15807	1.36
Past Alex and Justin are going on a field trip, where they hope they can find a way to get Alex and Nori together. However, things quickly go wrong and result in Alex breaking his wrist and Justin developing feelings for Nori. Present Alex encounters the man his wife cheated on him with and, while at first appearing to forgive him, later lets out his anger when the man uses a cheat code in a game and punches him; the pain from his wrist causes him to faint. When he comes to, he forgives the man due to him not knowing that Sarah was married, but says they can't be friends. Future Alex is considering dating again, but can't find anyone on a dating site. He eventually finds himself interested in former business rival Kelly and, despite their antagonistic past, he is happy that he is moving on from Eleanor.
8	"Home Alone"	Matt Sohn	Ben Joseph	July 7, 2018	T12.15808	1.06
Past Alex and Justin convince their Ron and Maggie to let them stay at home by themselves while they are out having their anniversary. However, the two are quickly frightened after watching R rated movies and booby trap the house. When Justin reveals he is interested in Nori while scared, Alex is captured by their traps. Despite being hurt at first, Alex forgives Justin, as he understands that there are plenty of people interested in Nori and knows that Justin wouldn't hurt him on purpose. Present Alex is forced to move back in with Ron and Maggie for a short time, where he is given a job by the more successful Justin. However, he then learns that the job was made up and, while explaining why he loves his job, makes Justin realize that he hates his job, unknowingly convincing him to quit. This puts Justin in the right place to figure out he wants to get involved in politics. Future Alex is upset when he learns Justin is selling Ron and Maggie's old house due to no one living there anymore and spends the whole day scaring off potential buyers. However, upon encountering a family who doesn't want to change it, Alex agrees to let go of the house.
9	"Thanksgiving"	Steven Tsuchida	Susanna Wolff	July 14, 2018	T12.15809	1.25
After learning that Nori likes whatever her brother likes, past Alex and Justin find themselves competing for Nori's brother's approval when she and her brother are invited to Thanksgiving, in hopes that receiving her brother's approval will make her interested in them. However, she reveals to them in private that she only agrees with her brother in hopes he will give her his spare ticket to an event. Present Alex decides to spend Thanksgiving with Darryl and Wendy, but finds himself being set up on a blind date with a woman named Lisa against his will. Alex and Lisa decide to purposely act overly affectionate and even fake a proposal to get back at their friends for tricking them but, after leaving the house, admit they had fun and decide to date. Future Alex goes to a diner to have a makeshift Thanksgiving with Eleanor and is surprised when Kelly shows up, causing the two women to meet. They get along, much to Alex's surprise, and he is shocked that, contrary to his belief that him spitting a mint into her mouth by accident ended her interest in him, Nori remained interested. When he inquires why they never went out, she simply explains that it was because he never asked.
10	"Video Games"	Steve Pink	Joe Port & Joe Wiseman	July 14, 2018	T12.15810	0.94
Past Alex and Justin secretly open their Christmas presents and learn that they received a new game console. Despite agreeing to only play it once, Alex becomes addicted to playing it and, while fighting over it, the two boys accidentally break it. They go to the school bully Phil Ricozzi and help him get a date with Nori in return for his game console to replace the one they broke. However, much to Alex and Justin's horror, Nori clearly enjoyed spending time with Phil, so they begin to date each other. In the present day, Alex's new girlfriend Lisa invests in a new invention, but Alex is soon annoyed by her constant input and suggestions. When he tells her he doesn't want her to be an investor, she agrees, as she found working with him equally annoying, and the two decide to just be romantic partners. Future Alex, after playing a video game where a terrible player does better in a different position on the Chicago Bulls, tries to convince Abby to get the player in real life. However, after Abby agrees to consider it, he later learns Darryl gave the player power ups to make him better and is relieved to learn Abby didn't get the player. He agrees to not interfere with her work again.
11	"Phil Ricozzi"	Alex Reid	Bob Kushell	July 21, 2018	T12.15811	1.21
Alex is angry that Phil Ricozzi is dating Nori but, after he rubs it in his face by showing a letter Nori had given him, Alex allows Nori to find it so the two will break up. However, Phil then challenges Alex to a fight, which the two later agree to be a fake fight, as Alex makes Phil realise that, as a young actor, he can't afford to have his face bruised or damaged. But when Alex accidentally lets slip the fight was fake and embarrasses the two of them, Phil hits him. Present day Alex and Darryl encounter an adult Phil, who tricks them into thinking he wants to buy their invention, but instead actually decides to make sure they can't sell it to anyone as revenge for breaking him and Nori up. Alex confronts him, but ends up being punched again. Future Alex is overjoyed when Eleanor tells him Phil has died and only reluctantly agrees to go with her to his funeral. When he is convinced to give a speech for Phil there, he struggles to say nice things and instead says how much he disliked Phil. However, as he speaks, Alex realises how important Phil had been in his life, as past Alex gained some popularity for taking the hit in the fight and present Alex came up with new ideas after confronting Phil that later helped him create his business. This leads him to kindly thanking Phil for helping him reach where he was in his life.
12	"The Breakup"	John Fortenberry	Craig Gerard & Matthew Zinman	July 21, 2018	T12.15812	0.99
Past Alex runs for student council president against Nori in hopes of using the power to allow an invention convention, while Nori wants a school dance; as both give their speeches, Alex accidentally admits he loves her into the microphone. However, this earns him more votes from people, as they found him either funny or brave, and Alex decides to give Nori the school dance. Present Alex finds himself disliking his relationship with Lisa and wants to break up with her, but Darryl wants him to wait until after Wendy's birthday. However, he accidentally slips out his plans to break up with her and Lisa breaks up with him. Despite being annoyed, Wendy and Darryl forgive him after he explains he did it because he wants the same connection they have. Future Alex is shocked when Abby reveals she is leaving being the manager of the Chicago Bulls to work with the Los Angeles Lakers, but feels guilty when she reveals on TV that she took the job to be closer to him. In order to apologise, he wears Laker colours to show his support of her choices.
13	"There She Goes"	Bill Purple	Story by : Ben Joseph & Susanna Wolff; Teleplay by : Richard Brandon Manus & Lauren Pomerantz	July 21, 2018	T12.15813	0.98
Past Alex tries to ask Nori to the school dance, but fails when another student beats him to it. Justin convinces Alex to ask his lab partner Julia, with Alex being oblivious of her feelings towards him, to the dance to make Nori jealous. Despite at first being reluctant, Alex finds himself bonding with Julia and enjoying himself but, when a student interested in Julia overhears Justin mentioning why Alex asked her out, Julia angrily leaves him. A guilty Alex tries to make up with Julia and, realizing that he apparently no longer cares for Nori the same way (evidenced by his lack of seeing her in slow motion, something that happens repeatedly in the series), Alex makes a grand romantic gesture to apologise to Julia. She is clearly happy by this and forgives him, this event showing what allowed Alex to move on from Nori and eventually meet his future wife Sarah, which would enable the birth of Abby. Present Alex finds himself considering getting back together with Sarah after she reveals that she wants that, but later tells her that the problems that led to her cheating on him and their divorce won't just go away. Alex then moves out of Darryl's garage into a new home. Future Alex is upset to learn while on a double date that Eleanor is moving away with her boyfriend, which leads to Kelly breaking up with him. Alex tells Eleanor that, while he is upset, he respects her decision and says goodbye. While leaving, however, Eleanor realizes her feelings for Alex and decides to stay with him.

== Reception ==
=== Ratings ===
Viewership and ratings per episode of Me, Myself & I
No.	Title	Air date	Rating/share (18–49)	Viewers (millions)
1	"Pilot"	September 25, 2017	1.6/6	7.46
2	"The First Step"	October 2, 2017	1.0/4	5.15
3	"The Card"	October 9, 2017	0.9/3	4.33
4	"Star Wars"	October 16, 2017	0.9/3	4.28
5	"Family Tree"	October 23, 2017	0.9/3	4.65
6	"New Job"	October 30, 2017	0.7/2	3.91
7	"Field Trip"	July 7, 2018	0.2/1	1.36
8	"Home Alone"	July 7, 2018	0.2/1	1.06
9	"Thanksgiving"	July 14, 2018	0.2/1	1.25
10	"Video Games"	July 14, 2018	0.2/1	0.94
11	"Phil Ricozzi"	July 21, 2018	0.2/1	1.21
12	"The Breakup"	July 21, 2018	0.2/1	0.99
13	"There She Goes"	July 21, 2018	0.2/1	0.98

=== Critical response ===
The review aggregator website Rotten Tomatoes reported a 63% approval rating with an average rating of 6.12/10 based on 24 reviews. Metacritic, which uses a weighted average, assigned a score of 57 out of 100 based on 18 critics, indicating "mixed or average reviews".
