= The Crew (2021 TV series) =

2021 American comedy streaming television series

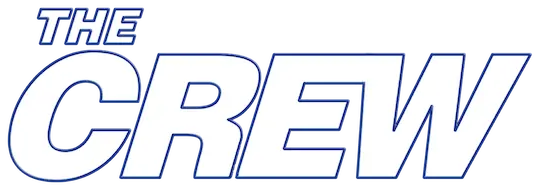
- Genre: Comedy
- Created by: Jeff Lowell
- Directed by: Andy Fickman
- Starring: Kevin James; Jillian Mueller; Freddie Stroma; Gary Anthony Williams; Dan Ahdoot; Sarah Stiles
- Music by: Alec Puro
- Country of origin: United States
- Original language: English
- No. of seasons: 1
- No. of episodes: 10

Production
- Executive producers: Kevin James; Jeff Lowell; Todd Garner; Matt Summers; Tim Clark; Jeff Sussman; Andy Fickman
- Producer: Nancy Chadrow Haas
- Cinematography: Bill Berner
- Editor: Matt Davis
- Camera setup: Multi-camera
- Running time: 20–30 minutes
- Production companies: Burrow Owl Productions; NASCAR Productions; Hey Eddie Productions; Broken Road Productions

Original release
- Network: Netflix
- Release: February 15, 2021

The Crew is an American comedy television series created by Jeff Lowell for Netflix that premiered on February 15, 2021. The series stars Kevin James as the crew chief of a NASCAR race team. In July 2021, the series was canceled after one season.

== Premise ==
The series takes place in a NASCAR garage where the crew chief butts heads with his new boss and "tech-reliant millennial" staff when his owner decided to retire and let his Stanford-educated daughter take over the racing team.

== Cast and characters ==
=== Main ===
- Kevin James as Kevin Gibson, the crew chief of Bobby Spencer Racing
- Jillian Mueller as Catherine Spencer, the new CEO of Bobby Spencer Racing and Bobby Spencer's daughter
- Freddie Stroma as Jake Martin, the driver of Bobby Spencer Racing
- Gary Anthony Williams as Chuck Stubbs, the car chief of Bobby Spencer Racing
- Dan Ahdoot as Amir Lajani, the chief engineer of Bobby Spencer Racing
- Sarah Stiles as Beth Paige, the office manager of Bobby Spencer Racing

=== Recurring ===
- Bruce McGill as Bobby Spencer, the owner and the old CEO of the racing team
- Paris Berelc as Jessie De La Cruz, a young racing driver that Catherine is considering hiring to replace Jake
- Mather Zickel as Frank, Beth's boyfriend who is a financial analyst at Kinnane Brothers

=== Guest starring ===
- Kim Coates as Rob, the racing team's biggest sponsor
- Ryan Blaney as Himself
- Austin Dillon as Himself
- Jamie Little as Herself
- Cole Custer as Himself
- Lesli Margherita as Morgan Conrad, the owner of Fake Steak and Kevin's love interest

== Episodes ==
No.	Title	Directed by	Written by	Original release date
1	"I Guess That Cake Did Need to Be Refrigerated"	Andy Fickman	Jeff Lowell	February 15, 2021
2	"My Name's Kevin and I Care About Feelings"	Andy Fickman	William Vallery	February 15, 2021
3	"Hot Mushroom Meat"	Andy Fickman	Teleplay by : Jeff Lowell; Story by : Burke Johnson & Alexandra Melnick	February 15, 2021
4	"You Seem Like a Perfectly Serviceable Woman"	Andy Fickman	Jessica Kravitz	February 15, 2021
5	"Your Face Is a Baby"	Andy Fickman	Chelsea Catalanotto	February 15, 2021
6	"We're Gonna Be Okay. We're Gonna Be Okay."	Andy Fickman	Monica Hewes & Diana Gettinger	February 15, 2021
7	"Ooof, Someone Throw a Robe on Grandma"	Andy Fickman	Rock Reuben	February 15, 2021
8	"Good Things Happen to Handsome People"	Andy Fickman	Pete Correale	February 15, 2021
9	"Monkeys and Bears Riding Bicycles"	Andy Fickman	Kenan A. Kel	February 15, 2021
10	"No One Likes You. No One."	Andy Fickman	Michael Loftus	February 15, 2021

== Production ==
=== Development ===
On September 4, 2019, Netflix gave the production a series order. The series is created by Jeff Lowell who also executive produced alongside Kevin James, Jeff Sussman, Todd Garner, Matt Summers and Tim Clark. On July 2, 2021, Netflix canceled the series after one season.

=== Casting ===
Upon series order announcement, Kevin James was also cast to star in the series. On December 17, 2019, Gary Anthony Williams, Dan Ahdoot, Freddie Stroma, Sarah Stiles, and Jillian Mueller joined the cast as series regulars. On January 30, 2020, Mather Zickel was cast in a recurring role. On January 15, 2021, it was reported that Paris Berelc and Bruce McGill were cast in recurring capacities.

=== Filming ===
The Crew was filmed at Gold Coast Studios in Bethpage, New York, but it is set in Charlotte, North Carolina.

== Release ==
The series was released on Netflix on February 15, 2021.

== Reception ==
On Rotten Tomatoes, the series holds an approval rating of 40% based on 10 critic reviews, with an average rating of 4.7/10. Metacritic gave the series a weighted average score of 49 out of 100 based on 5 critics, indicating "mixed or average reviews".
