= Maria Blasucci =

American actress and comedy writer

- Born: Los Angeles, California, U.S.
- Occupations: Actress, comedy writer
- Years active: 2008-present

Maria Blasucci is an American actress and comedy writer. She is best known for roles in television shows including Family Tree on HBO and Ghost Ghirls on Yahoo Screen.

== Early life ==
She graduated from Marymount High School and earned a degree in theater arts at Loyola Marymount University in 2008. She studied improv comedy at IO West.

== Career ==
Her basketball team is the subject of The Pistol Shrimps, a documentary produced by Morgan Spurlock that premiered at the 2016 Tribeca Film Festival. She was an on-set writer for Neighbors 2: Sorority Rising. She currently stars in the Comedy Central series Drunk History and can be seen as Jessica Mundt in Mascots on Netflix. She is a co-founder of the Earios podcast network where she co-hosts The Big Ones as well as serves as producer and fan favorite of WebCrawlers. She is a frequent guest star on the podcast Spontaneanation hosted by Paul F. Tompkins on Earwolf.
