= Hal Lublin =

American actor

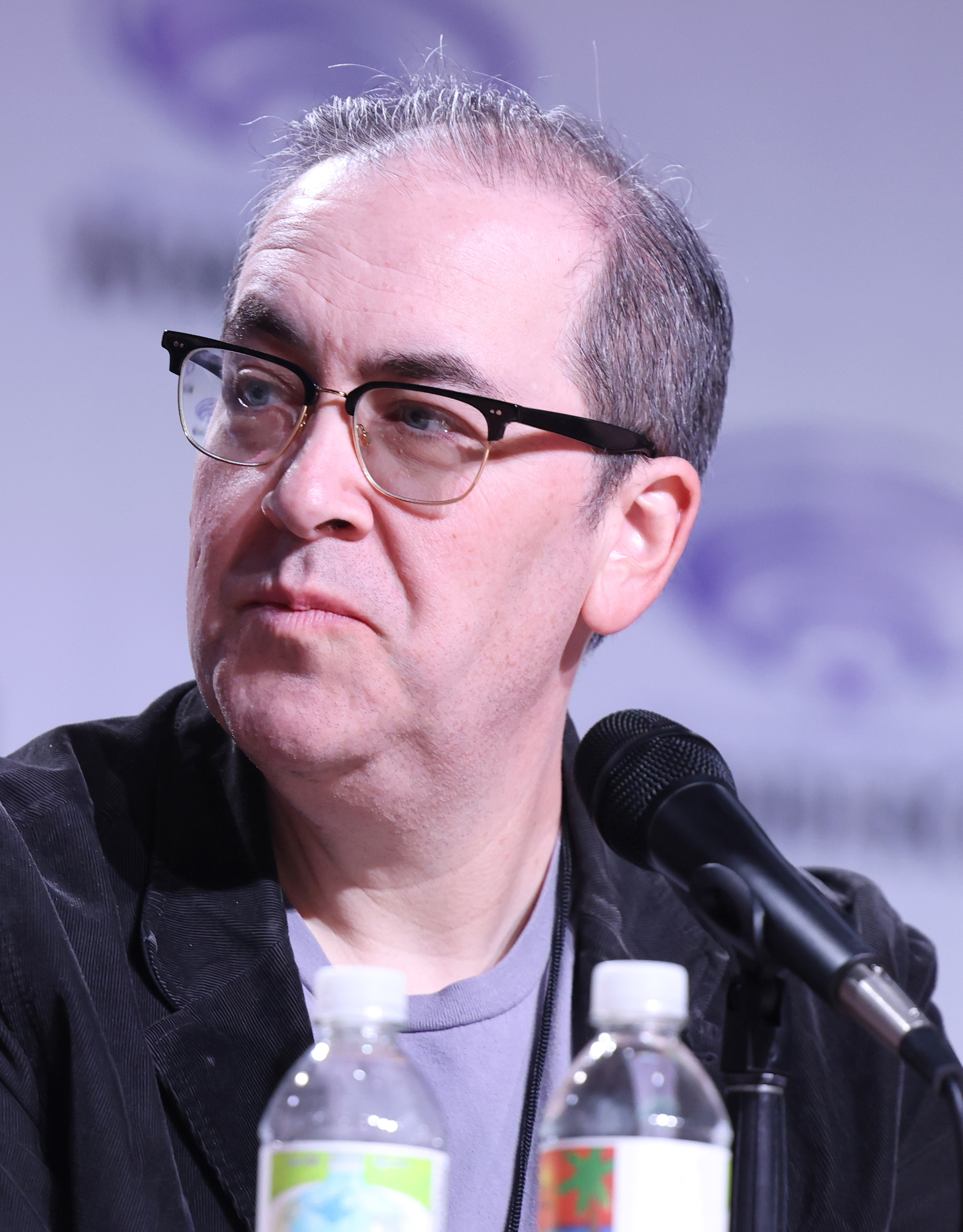
- Lublin in 2025
- Education: Syracuse University
- Occupations: Actor, comedian, voice-over artist
- Years active: 2001–present

Hal Lublin is an American actor, improv performer, and voice-over artist best known for his work on the Thrilling Adventure Hour and Welcome to Night Vale.

== Biography ==
Originally from Philadelphia, Lublin was a fan of animation and comic books as a child. He graduated from Syracuse University in 1999. In 2000, he moved to Los Angeles and subsequently developed asthma due to the climate. Lublin's first voice acting job was an unpaid role for the Haunted Mansion's Club 33.

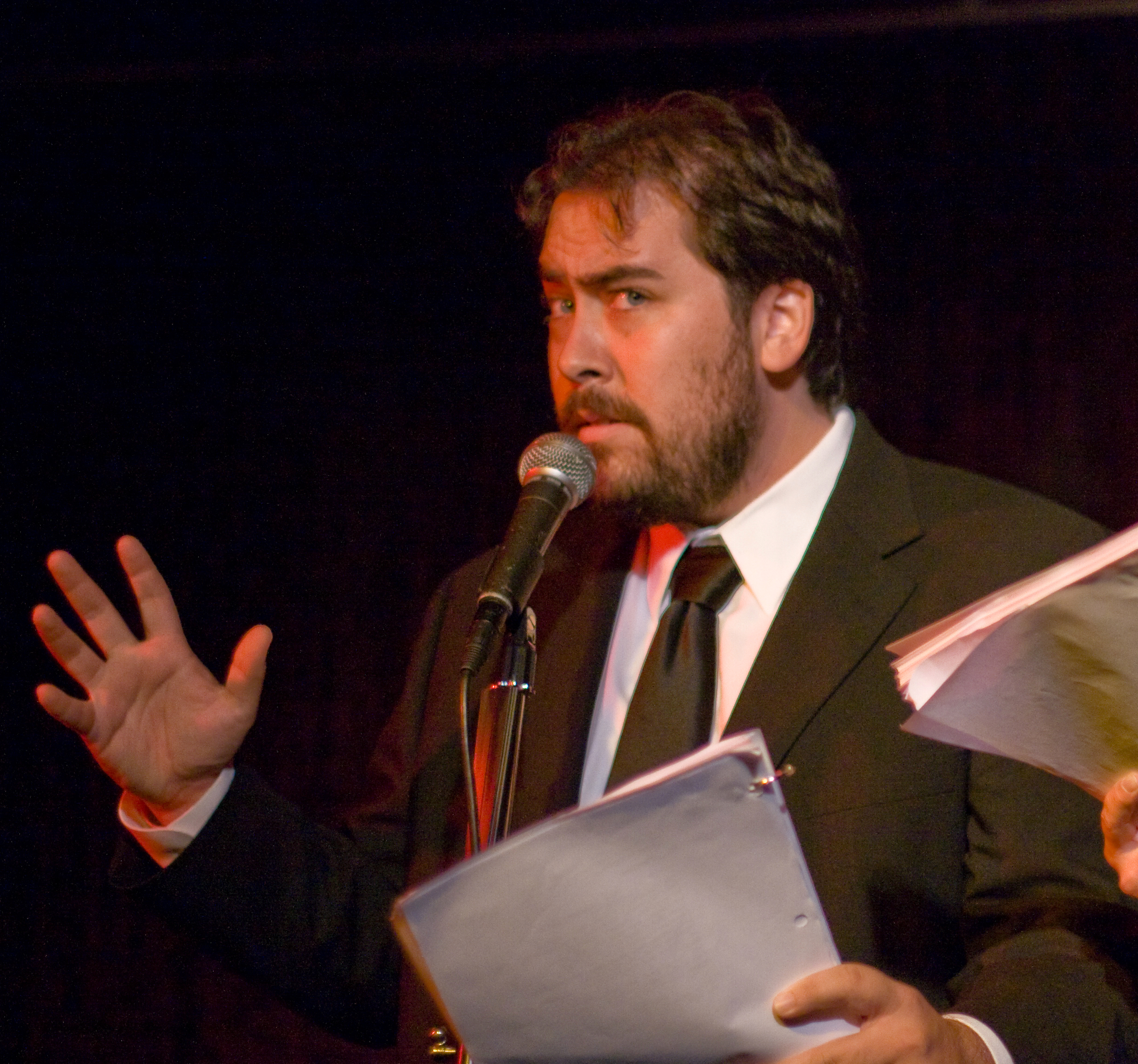
Hal Lublin in The Thrilling Adventure Hour

Lublin has studied improvisational comedy with The Groundlings, The Second City, and iO West. At his Second City Graduation, he was invited to do voice work for the anime for Read or Die, leading to additional voice work. He does voice work, including animation, commercials, and video games. He voiced a lead character in the animated series Slammo & Sloshie. Since 2006, Lublin has been featured in a video series for Symantec as Hal, The IT Admin.

Lublin co-creates UN-imations with Len Peralta, which are improvised pieces of art in which Lublin provides a voice and Peralta must create a drawing from scratch based upon that voice. It was announced in September 2015 that Lublin would be appearing in season six of The Venture Bros. He voiced the characters Wide Wale and Manolo. He is a frequent guest on EW Radio's L.A. Daily on SiriusXM.

=== Podcasts ===
Lublin has been a WorkJuice player on the Thrilling Adventure Hour starting in 2005, when it started as a stage show at M Bar in Los Angeles, through the end of its formal run in 2015. His roles included the announcer for the segment Beyond Belief, Gummy to Craig Cackowski's Banjo in Moonshine Holler, Phillip Fathom, and numerous other recurring characters. Through the Thrilling Adventure Hour, Lublin met Jackson Publick, which led to his role on The Venture Bros.

In October 2013 Lublin joined the popular podcast Welcome to Night Vale, first voicing Steve Carlsberg in a live episode performed in Brooklyn. Lublin has also been a frequent guest in The David Feldman Show. Lublin and fellow WorkJuice Player Mark Gagliardi launched We Got This with Mark and Hal, a podcast in which the two provide definitive answers to pointless debates, in February 2015. In July 2015 the podcast joined the Maximum Fun podcast network. Lublin also hosts a weekly wrestling podcast Tights and Fights, which wraps up the week in wrestling, covering major events and storylines. In a 2017 article, The Comeback stated: "These are people who genuinely enjoy pro wrestling from a storytelling perspective, but who also want to dig into what's going on behind the scenes and off-screen as well."

== Filmography ==
=== Television ===
Year	Title	Episode(s)	Role
2001	Read or Die		Otto Lilienthal, Eliot (voice)
2003	Hey Monie!		Construction Worker
2003	Becker	Sister Spoils the Turkey	Mr. O'Neal
2004	Dead Leaves		Blue Elephant; Mini Bluto; Mr. Coffee; Offspring; Pedestrian; Ship Computer; Testicle Head (voice)
2005	Reeling in Reality		Todd Lespinasse
2005	Gregory Shitcock, P.I.	S01E01	Lumberjack
2007	Slammo and Sloshie		Sloshie/narrator (voice)
2008	Team Doctors	TV movie	Spencer
2009	See Dick Run		Pawn Broker
2013	NerdHQ	Thrilling Adventure Hour: Conversation with Cast & Creators	Himself
2014	The Wil Wheaton Project	Wil vs. Hedorah	Reginald Borday
2014	Thrilling Adventure Hour Live		WorkJuice Player
2016–2019	Mighty Magiswords		The Great Omnibus, Smashroom, Ice Posey, Crunch Dislikus, Punchica, Pirate 08, Shopkeeper, Toots, Toad, Crowd Man, Galactonian Player 1, Shadow Beast, Hootlydoot, Valet, Horse King, Galactonian Grey Griffin, Store
2016–2023	The Venture Bros.	Seasons 6 & 7, Radiant is the Blood of the Baboon's Heart	Wide Wale, Manolo, Clayton, Tunnel Vision, Security Guard #1, Jagermeister, Janitor, Wandering Spider, Boy, Whale Lice Henchman 2, Tiny Eagle, Z Henchman
2017	Adam Ruins Everything	"Adam Ruins College"	College Bears
2020	Gary Busey: Pet Judge	"Hurting Turtle"	Hal

=== Podcasts ===
Podcast	Episode	Date	Role
Thrilling Adventure Hour	All	2010-2015	WorkJuice Player
The Dead Authors Podcast	Appendix A	2011/12/20	Charles Dickens
The Dead Authors Podcast	Chapter 19	2012/12/24	Luke
The Dead Authors Podcast	Chapter 41	2014/12/24	Dr. Seuss
The David Feldman Show	Various	2013-2014	
Welcome to Night Vale	#37.5, #49B, #53, #56.5, #110	2013/10; 2017	Steven Carlsberg
Brock Party	#46	2014/04/22	
Spontaneanation	#12, #21, #25, #33, #40, #45, #50, #59, #65	2015	Improv actor
We Got This with Mark and Hal	All	2015	Co-host with Mark Gagliardi
Tights and Fights	All	2016	Host
Surprisingly Nice	All	2017	Co-host with Travis McElroy
Star Wars Minute	Attack of the Clones minutes 76-80	2017	Guest
Trends Like These	May 26, 2017	2017	Beyond the Headlines segment guest host
The Peanuts Gallery	It's The Easter Beagle, Charlie Brown, Race For Your Life, Charlie Brown	2017-2018	Guest
The Adventure Zone	The Adventure Zone: Amnesty: Episode 29	2019	Agent Haynes
Meddling Adults	Scooby Doo and Stonehenge's Running Track w/Hal Lublin & Gabriel Urbina	2020	Guest
