= Free Bert =

American comedy series

- Genre: Comedy
- Created by: Bert Kreischer; Jarrad Paul; Andy Mogel
- Starring: Bert Kreischer; Arden Myrin; Ava Ryan; Lilou Lang; Chris Witaske; Mandell Maughan
- Country of origin: United States
- Original language: English
- No. of seasons: 1
- No. of episodes: 6

Production
- Executive producers: Bert Kreischer; LeeAnn Kreischer; Tony Hernandez; Lilly Burns; Elise Henderson; Judi Marmel; Jarrad Paul; Andy Mogel
- Running time: approximately 30 minutes
- Production company: Counterpart Studios

Original release
- Network: Netflix
- Release: January 22, 2026

Free Bert is an American comedy television series created by Bert Kreischer, Jarrad Paul, and Andy Mogel. The series premiered on Netflix on January 22, 2026. The show stars Kreischer in a fictionalized version of himself as a comedian whose family relocates to Beverly Hills so his daughters can attend an elite private school. The first season consists of six episodes, all released simultaneously.

In March 2026, Netflix renewed the series for a second season.

== Premise ==
The series follows a fictionalized version of comedian Bert Kreischer and his family as they move to Beverly Hills after his daughters enroll at an exclusive private school called Barklidge. Kreischer's unfiltered personality and down-to-earth demeanor clash with the wealthy, image-conscious parents in the community, quickly making the Kreischer family social outcasts in their new neighborhood. The show explores themes of fitting in, family dynamics, and class differences through a comedic lens.

== Cast and characters ==
=== Main ===
- Bert Kreischer as Bert Kreischer, a comedian and father who struggles to adapt to the social expectations of Beverly Hills
- Arden Myrin as LeeAnn Kreischer, Bert's wife
- Ava Ryan as Georgia Kreischer, the Kreischers' older daughter
- Lilou Lang as Ila Kreischer, the Kreischers' younger daughter
- Chris Witaske as Landon Vanderthal, a Barklidge parent
- Mandell Maughan as Chanel Vanderthal, Landon's wife and a Barklidge parent
- Christine Horn as Headmaster Rossmyre, the head of Barklidge school
- Sophia Reid-Gantzert as Kiersten Vanderthal, the Vanderthals' daughter

=== Recurring ===
- Braxton Alexander as Zac Hotchkiss
- Matthew Del Negro as Randy Hotchkiss
- Robert Mello as Dr. Jeff
- Noshir Dalal as Glen Darvish

=== Guest ===
- Rob Lowe as himself
- T-Pain as himself
- Pacman Jones as himself

== Episodes ==
Season	Episodes	Originally released
1	6	January 22, 2026

=== Season 1 (2026) ===
No. overall	No. in season	Title	Directed by	Written by	Original release date
1	1	"The Crowd Pleaser"	Andrew Mogel & Jarrad Paul	Andrew Mogel & Jarrad Paul & Bert Kreischer	January 22, 2026
An existential crisis at a celebrity soiree pushes Bert to get more involved in his daughters' lives, with predictably disastrous results.
2	2	"Wearing Thin"	Andrew Mogel & Jarrad Paul	Andrew Mogel & Jarrad Paul	January 22, 2026
Bert's attempt to transform a campus conflict into comedy material lands Georgia on house arrest, where a new face in her DMs sparks parental concern.
3	3	"Nutless"	Andrew Mogel & Jarrad Paul	Andrew Mogel & Jarrad Paul	January 22, 2026
Bert and LeeAnn scramble to polish their image at a posh poolside brunch while trying to undo their missteps regarding Georgia's crush.
4	4	"The New Fourth"	Andrew Mogel & Jarrad Paul	Andrew Mogel & Jarrad Paul	January 22, 2026
Bert leverages a catastrophe to arrange a day out with the other Barklidge dads, leaving LeeAnn trapped in close quarters with a frenemy.
5	5	"A Doubt Firestorm"	Andrew Mogel & Jarrad Paul	Andrew Mogel & Jarrad Paul	January 22, 2026
Cornered by an unexpected blackmailer, Bert must evade suspicion on a boys' trip while LeeAnn's cover-up starts to crumble.
6	6	"Proper Descension"	Andrew Mogel & Jarrad Paul	Andrew Mogel & Jarrad Paul	January 22, 2026
As Barklidge prepares to crown its king and queen, the Kreischers must decide whether they are happier fitting in or standing out.

== Production ==
=== Development ===
Free Bert was created by Bert Kreischer, Jarrad Paul, and Andy Mogel. Paul and Mogel, who previously collaborated on the series Huge in France and The Grinder, serve as showrunners, writers, and directors on the series. The series is executive produced by Kreischer, LeeAnn Kreischer, Tony Hernandez, Lilly Burns, and Elise Henderson for Counterpart Studios, along with Judi Marmel.

=== Filming ===
The series was filmed in Atlanta, Georgia.

== Release ==
All six episodes of the first season were released simultaneously on Netflix on January 22, 2026. First-look photos from the series were unveiled in December 2025.

=== Reception ===
==== Critical response ====
The series received mixed reviews from critics. On Rotten Tomatoes, the first season holds a 68% audience score.

Daniel Fienberg of The Hollywood Reporter gave the series a mixed review, writing that "although Free Bert is successful on some level, telling a neatly arced story over six half-hour episodes that resolve in a way I found strangely satisfying [...] it's not especially funny." However, Fienberg noted that "Kreischer is a reasonably good actor, or at least an actor with a lot of built-in intensity and general screen presence."

Other reviewers offered more positive assessments; Giant Freakin Robot described the series as "a refreshing take on a tired trope," writing that "Free Bert ultimately succeeds because it understands a core comedic truth: fitting in is overrated, and the attempt to do so is inherently ridiculous."

==== Viewership ====
Following its premiere, Free Bert debuted in Netflix's global top 10 most-watched television series. The show reached the 6th most-watched TV show on Netflix worldwide and the 4th most-watched in the United States.

=== Season 2 ===
On March 17, 2026, Netflix renewed Free Bert for a second season. The second season is expected to film in Atlanta.
