= Jean Villepique =

American actress

Jean Villepique (/ˈvɪləpiːk/ VIL-ə-peek}) is an American actress known for her roles in BoJack Horseman, A.P. Bio, and Up All Night. Villepique was previously a member of The Second City. Born in New Jersey, she earned a Bachelor of Arts degree in theatre from Northwestern University.

Raised in Bernardsville, New Jersey, Villepique graduated from Bernards High School in 1991.

== Filmography ==
=== Film ===
Year	Title	Role	Notes
2006	I Want Someone to Eat Cheese With	Second City Actor	
2009	I Love You, Man	Leanne	
2009	The Goods: Live Hard, Sell Hard	Selleck Customer – Mother	
2014	A Better You	Neighbor	
2021	Supercool	Mrs. Tobbler	

=== Television ===
Year	Title	Role	Notes
2007	30 Rock	Therapist	Episode: "Rosemary's Baby"
2007	Curb Your Enthusiasm	Nurse	Episode: "The N Word"
2007, 2010	The Office	Rachel Wallace	2 episodes
2008	My Boys	Beth	2 episodes
2010	Terriers	Aggatha Hagglethorpe	Episode: "Dog and Pony"
2011	Modern Family	Jen	Episode: "Mother's Day"
2011–2012	Up All Night	Terry Martin	20 episodes
2012	Workaholics	Vanessa Korson	Episode: "The Meat Jerking Beef Boys"
2012	Sketchy	Mom	Episode: "MTV Presents: Weekend at Bernie's"
2012, 2013	Key & Peele	Character	2 episodes
2013	Grey's Anatomy	ER Nurse	Episode: "Idle Hands"
2013	Instant Mom	Dee	Episode: "Dances with She-Wolves"
2013	Infomercials	Eileen	Episode: "Broomshakalaka!"
2014	Growing Up Fisher	Beth / Jenny	2 episodes
2014	We Hate Paul Revere	Barmaid	Television film
2015	The Comedians	Melissa Cohen	Episode: "Celebrity Guest"
2015	Playing House	Michaela	Episode: "Employee of the Month"
2015	Austin & Ally	Joanna	Episode: "Bad Seeds & Bad Dates"
2015	Filthy Preppy Teens	Beth	Episode: "St. Patrick's Day"
2016	Baskets	Dr. Rimes	Episode: "Sugar Pie"
2016	The Carmichael Show	Therapist	Episode: "The Blues"
2016	Veep	NY Times Reporter	3 episodes
2016	New Girl	Deb	Episode: "Christmas Eve Eve"
2017	The Legend of Master Legend	Lianne	Television film
2017	Life in Pieces	Mrs. Sandoval	Episode: "Babysit Argument Invention Butterfly"
2017	Better Call Saul	Doreen Valco	Episode: "Expenses"
2017	Life After First Failure	Donna Robbins / mom	Episode: "Pilot Pt. 1"
2018	Mr. Neighbor's House 2	Cindy	Television film
2018	Sharp Objects	Gretchen	3 episodes
2018–2019	BoJack Horseman	Tracy / Traffic Cop	6 episodes
2018–2021	A.P. Bio	Michelle Jones	42 episodes
