= Ghost Ghirls =

- Genre: Comedy; Supernatural
- Created by: Maria Blasucci; Jeremy Konner; Amanda Lund
- Written by: Maria Blasucci; Jeremy Konner; Amanda Lund; Ryan Corrigan; Johnny Mais; Monica Padrick
- Directed by: Jeremy Konner
- Starring: Maria Blasucci; Amanda Lund
- Country of origin: United States
- No. of seasons: 1
- No. of episodes: 12

Production
- Executive producers: Jack Black; Maria Blasucci; Jeremy Konner; Amanda Lund; Priyanka Mattoo
- Running time: 12 minutes
- Production company: Electric Dynamite

Original release
- Network: Yahoo! Screen
- Release: September 8, 2013

Ghost Ghirls is a scripted comedy web series produced by Jack Black, following the antics of two best friends, Heidi and Angelica, who work as paranormal investigators. Each episode details the humorous adventures of the bumbling duo as they attempt to solve otherworldly cases while not tripping over themselves in the process. The show was created, written, produced and starred in by Maria Blasucci and Amanda Lund. Jeremy Konner co-created, co-wrote and directed all episodes.

The show premiered all 12 episodes on Yahoo! Screen on September 8, 2013.

== Cast and characters ==
=== Main ===
Actor	Role
Maria Blasucci	Angelica Byers
Amanda Lund	Heidi Button
Allan McLeod	Rudy

=== Guest ===
- Jack Black
- Molly Shannon
- Val Kilmer
- Dave Grohl
- Jake Johnson
- Jason Ritter
- Molly Hawkey
- Kate Micucci
- Jillian Rose Reed
- Sugar Lyn Beard
- Brett Gelman
- Colin Hanks
- Jay Hernandez
- Natasha Leggero
- Bob Odenkirk
- Jason Schwartzman

== See also ==
- List of original programs distributed by Yahoo! Screen
