= Thrilling Adventure Hour =

Staged production and podcast in the style of old time radio

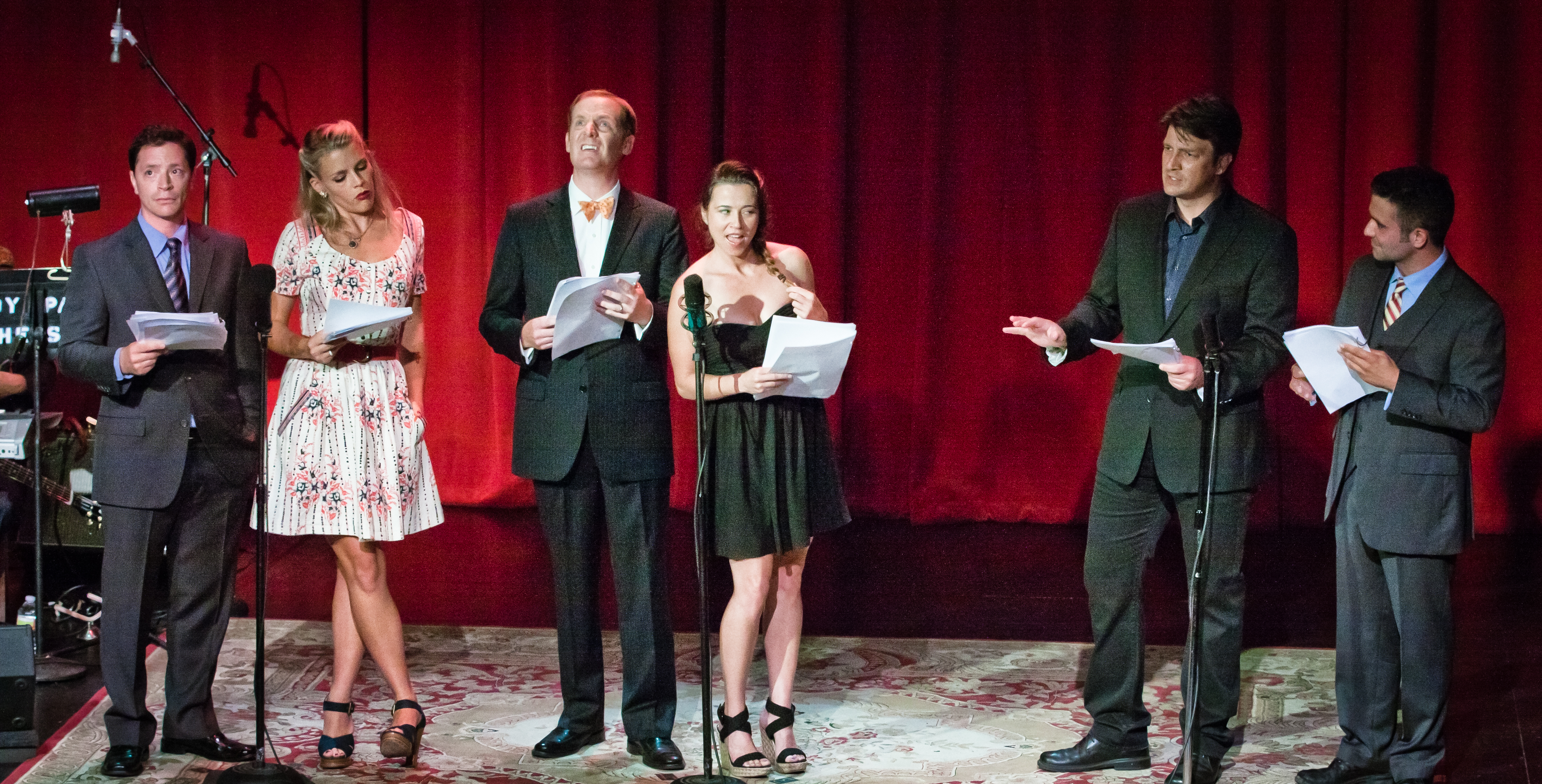
Thrilling Adventure Hour (August 2011) L-R: Josh Malina, Busy Philipps, Marc Evan Jackson, Linda Cardellini, Nathan Fillion, and Mark Gagliardi

The Thrilling Adventure Hour was a staged production and podcast in the style of old time radio that was held monthly at Largo, a Los Angeles nightclub located in the former Coronet Theatre. The show ran from March 2005 to April 2015. Each episode featured three non-serialized segments as well as songs and commercials from fictional sponsors. The show was written by Ben Acker and Ben Blacker; and directed by Aaron Ginsburg. The show's original songs were written by Acker & Blacker with the composer and band leader Andy Paley.

== History ==
The roots of the Thrilling Adventure Hour began in Blacker's living room where he and Acker held a reading of their film script for a space western called Sparks Nevada, Marshal on Mars. Struck by the quality of the performances, they decided to launch a stage show with a radio conceit, so that the performers had the luxury of holding scripts in their hands and minimal blocking. The conceit allowed Acker and Blacker to not impose too greatly on their actor friends, while maintaining a regular deadline for generating material, honing their craft and workshopping content in front of an audience.

The Thrilling Adventure and Supernatural Suspense Hour began a five-year run at M Bar in Hollywood in March 2005. The original WorkJuice Players were Dave 'Gruber' Allen, Paget Brewster, Craig Cackowski, Mark Gagliardi, Marc Evan Jackson, Hal Lublin, Annie Savage and Paul F. Tompkins. In episode six, Eban Schletter performed live musical accompaniment. Schletter wrote the theme song to "Sparks Nevada, Marshal on Mars". In episode seven, the show was joined by Andy Paley. Acker & Blacker and Paley created musical content for the show. Paley arranged Schletter's Sparks Nevada theme and performed themes and songs with his Andy Paley Orchestra, which, at the time, consisted of Jillinda Palmer, Ben Jaffe, and Brittney Westover.

In episode eight, the show was joined by Joel Spence, a Foley artist and actor. Soon thereafter, Aaron Ginsburg joined as director. Shortly after that, Samm Levine, Danny Strong, and John DiMaggio joined the cast, followed by James Urbaniak, John Ennis and Autumn Reeser. The band Common Rotation made a guest appearance on the show and played afterwards. Common Rotation became a regular staple following the Thrilling Adventure Hour. Marc Evan Jackson hosted Common Rotation's segment, which featured songs performed by Common Rotation as well as WorkJuice players and guest stars.

The final performance of The Thrilling Adventure and Supernatural Suspense Hour at M Bar was in January 2010. In March 2010, The Thrilling Adventure Hour shortened its title and started its run at Largo at the Coronet where it continued. Beginning in January 2011, the Thrilling Adventure Hour began podcasting sketches from past performances. In January 2011, the cast took the show on the road for the first time and performed two shows at SF Sketchfest. In October 2011, the Thrilling Adventure Hour podcast joined the network of podcasts released by Chris Hardwick's Nerdist Industries.

At SDCC 2014, Thrilling Adventure Hour performed a live crossover show with the cast of Welcome to Night Vale titled "Thrilling Adventure Hour & Welcome to Night Vale Crossover", which was released for sale on Night Vale's Bandcamp and the iTunes music store on October 1, 2014.

In 2015, it was announced that after 10 years of live monthly Thrilling Adventure Hour stage performances, the last such performance would be April 11, 2015. Also announced, was that there will be two new monthly comics in the Sparks Nevada and Beyond Belief storylines, starting February 2015. The podcast will continue in the form of audio versions of the comic books.

The Thrilling Adventure Hour returned for new episodes in October 2018, as "Thrilling Adventure Hour Treasury".

== Recurring segments ==
Most episodes include both "Sparks Nevada" and "Beyond Belief". Normally "Sparks Nevada" begins a show and "Beyond Belief" ends the show.

=== "Sparks Nevada, Marshal on Mars" ===
"Sparks Nevada" is a Space Western set a thousand years in the future.

- Marc Evan Jackson plays Sparks Nevada, the marshal who protects the Red Planet from the universe's robotic outlaws, alien invaders, and other galactic threats. And he's from Earth.
- Mark Gagliardi plays Sparks Nevada's trusty native Martian sidekick, Croach the Tracker.
- Busy Philipps plays The Red Plains Rider, a human raised by Martians who rides the red plains of Mars in vigilante fashion.
- Nathan Fillion plays Cactoid Jim, Mayor of Mars, "King of the Martian Frontier."
- Linda Cardellini plays Rebecca Rose Rushmore, a popular writer of space cowboy novels who has come to Mars from Earth to live the sort of adventures she had only written about.
- Josh Malina plays the barkeep of the Space Saloon. He does not want any trouble in his place.
- Jenny Wade plays Mercy Laredo, intergalactic bounty hunter and ex-girlfriend of Sparks Nevada from his Space Academy days.
- Molly Quinn plays Pemily Stallwark, winner of Punishment Soccer and Sparks' deputy for a time, before becoming Marshal on the Moon.
- Paul F. Tompkins plays Jib Janeen, a spy from Jupiter, and K Of The Cosmos, a Mister Mxyzptlk-like inter-dimensional imp who regularly makes trouble for Sparks Nevada and Croach in the name of whimsy.
- Craig Cackowski plays local yokel Felton.

==== Spinoffs ====
- "The Red Plains Rider"
  - Starring Busy Philipps as The Red Plains Rider
- "Cactoid Jim, King of the Martian Frontier"
  - Starring Nathan Fillion as Cactoid Jim
- Tales of the Troubleshooters
  - Starring Jenny Wade as Mercy Laredo
- "Those Jupiter Janeens!"
  - Starring Paul F. Tompkins as Jib Janeen
- "Tales of the United Solar System Alliance"
  - Starring James Urbaniak as Captain Gene Peeples of the Starship Orsino.

=== "Beyond Belief" ===
Paul F. Tompkins and Paget Brewster play Frank and Sadie Doyle, a pair of fast-talking married mediums in the vein of Nick and Nora Charles. Although this pair of high-society types would rather enjoy martinis and each other's company, Frank and Sadie usually end up solving paranormal mysteries. Hal Lublin has regularly acted as the announcer for the segment.

=== The Chronopatrol Universe ===
While not an official title, the Chronopatrol Universe is a convenient way to refer to several mid-show segments that share characters and themes.

- "Jefferson Reid, Ace American" – A clandestine war is being waged against the Reich, and at the frontlines of this sometimes mystical, often monstrous battle, is Jefferson Reid, America's only super-soldier. Aided by his super-sweetheart, Agent Abby Adams (who hates nothing as much as she hates a dirty Kraut), and his plucky sidekick, Brownie Finn, Jefferson Reid, Ace American is a jingoistic romp through a World War II that never existed.
  - Starring Nathan Fillion as Jefferson Reid, Annie Savage as Agent Abby Adams and John DiMaggio as Rex Flagwell
- "Amelia Earhart, Fearless Flyer" – Spinning out of the pages of Ace American! Amelia Earhart faked her death in 1938 and went to work for the American Victory Commission. Now, she uses her Lockheed Elektra to crisscross the time stream to stop the Reich from rising where it shouldn't.
  - Starring Autumn Reeser as Amelia Earhart and Annie Savage as Agent Abby Adams
- "The Algonquin Four" – Dateline: the 1920s. A celebrated group of New York's sharpest wits met daily at The Algonquin Hotel, enjoying barbs and bon mots. Until one day a comet struck and those present found themselves possessed of powers beyond the ken of mortal men. Known for its catchphrase "Dorothy Parker SMASH!"
  - Starring Mark Gagliardi as Robert Benchley, Annie Savage as Dorothy Parker, James Urbaniak as Woodrow Wilson, and Joshua Malina as Harry Houdini
- "The Cross-Time Adventures of Colonel Tick-Tock" – The fey Colonel polices the fractured timeline for Her Majesty's Royal Chrono Patrol, interrupting not-always-terribly-well-researched historical moments and facing down the occasional villain, including the Greenwich Meanie, Auntie Meridian and the occasional dinosaur, from pre-history and all that. Pip pip!
  - Starring Craig Cackowski as Colonel Tick-Tock, Hal Lublin as Trick Clock and Mark Gagliardi as Queen Victoria

=== Captain Laserbeam ===
- "Captain Laserbeam" – As camp as the old Batman show, facing off against ridiculous villains such as the Numbler, the Die-brarian, and Shape-Ape, Captain Laserbeam protects Apex City while trying not to lose his patience with his excitable Adventurekateers or trip himself up emotionally with the pretty new police commissioner.
  - Starring John DiMaggio as Captain Laserbeam

==== Spinoff ====
- "Phillip Fathom, The Deep Sea Detective" - He is the sub-aquatic darkness. He is the Abyssopelagic layer. He exerts the pressure of justice on the metazoic creatures who lurk in the deep. He is the hero the ocean deserves. He is your semiamphibious knight. AND HIS PARENTS DIED AT SEA!!
  - Starring Hal Lublin as Phillip Fathom

=== Other segments ===
Episodes of The Thrilling Adventure Hour tend to include one of the following segments.

- "Desdemona Hughes, Diva Detective" - Tinseltown's Woman of a Thousand Faces solves mysteries in the Hollywood of Yesteryear.
  - Starring Jamie Denbo as Desdemona Hughes
- "Down in Moonshine Holler" – A hobo fairytale. During the Great Depression, a millionaire's son fell in love with a woman he thought was his societal equal. In truth, she was the Hobo Princess. She fled, leaving behind only a fingerless glove. Now, under the assumed identity of Banjo Bindlestuff, the millionaire's son rides the rails with his hobo-mentor Gummy, in search of his one true love he believes will be found in the possibly make-believe hobo-paradise: Moonshine Holler.
  - Starring Craig Cackowski as Banjo Bindlestuff and Hal Lublin as Gummy
- "Jumbo the Elephant" – A Cuban elephant plays in an all-animal jazz combo and saves holidays.
  - Starring Mark Gagliardi as Jumbo
- "Tales from the Black Lagoon" – An actor is framed for murder in the Hollywood of 1954.

=== Sponsors ===
- WorkJuice Coffee - Starring Paul F. Tompkins as The King of Coffee
- Patriot Brand Cigarettes
- Patriot Elites – a line of cigarettes for the wealthy
- Bucatino Business - Starring Craig Cackowski, this series of ads has a continuous narrative following the gradual collapse of Dan Bucatino's business and family.
- Sweetie-Pie Cakes

== Podcast ==
The Thrilling Adventure Hour began podcasting in January 2011. That same year, it became a member of the Nerdist Podcast Network. Production ceased in April 2015. After a hiatus of a few years, the podcast was brought back on the Forever Dog podcast network, with the back catalog found on the show's Patreon.

== Additional releases ==
The fourth season DVD of Castle features video of two episodes guest-starring people from the show—a Sparks Nevada with Molly Quinn, and a Cactoid Jim with Nathan Fillion as well as a behind-the-scenes documentary about the live show.

A graphic novel featuring stories based on each segment was released in 2013, and a concert film recording of one performance was released in spring 2015.

In October 2014, Image Comics digitally released two comics, both previews of 4 issue mini-series for Sparks Nevada and Beyond Belief. "The Sad, Sad Song of Widow Johnson" is a prequel to the canonical story of Sparks Nevada. Issue #4 of Beyond Belief was never released in print by Image Comics but is available digitally on Sellfy.com. Boom Studios took over the property in 2018, releasing a collected edition of the Beyond Belief miniseries and Issue #1 in a new run of Thrilling Adventure Hour stories.
