= Horses in Germany =

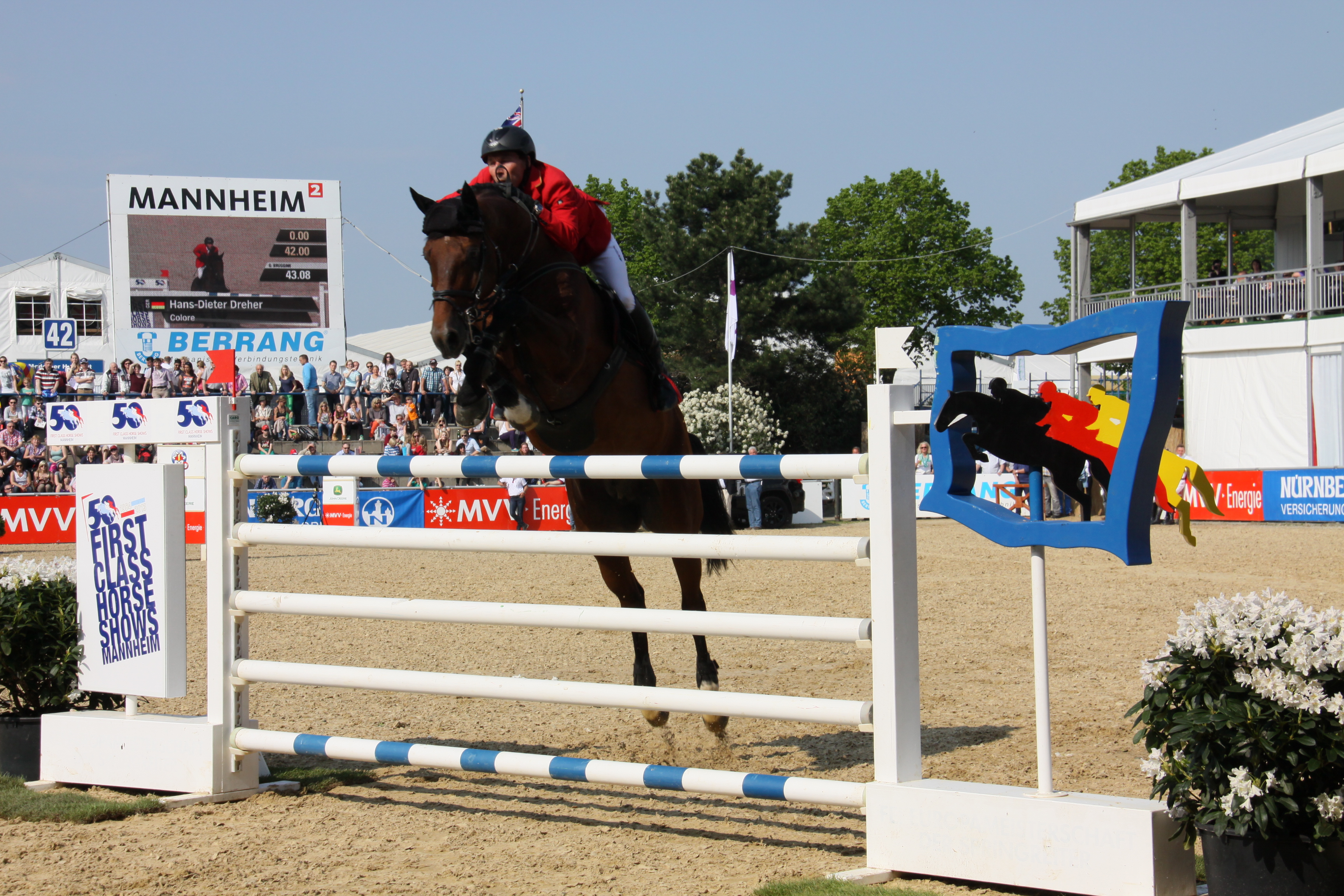
Jumping competition in Mannheim in 2015

The equine sector in Germany is one of the country's leading sporting industries, housing the largest population of horses in Europe. Germany is renowned for breeding sport horses, with the most distinguished animals originating from the Hanoverian, Holstein, and Oldenburger studbooks. The state actively supports the German equestrian sector and relies on federal stud farms. Additionally, horses hold significant cultural and religious importance in Germany.

== History ==
In 1938, West Germany recorded a population of 1.5 million horses; however, this number declined steadily until the late 1960s, reaching 250,000. Then, as economic development favored sport and recreational riding, the number of horses increased slightly to 350,000 in 1988. In 1982, with 364,000 horses, West Germany had the largest horse population in Europe. In 1990, 60% of all registered German mares were saddle and sport mares, and 20% were pony mares, making draft horses a small part of the West German horse population.

== Practices and uses ==
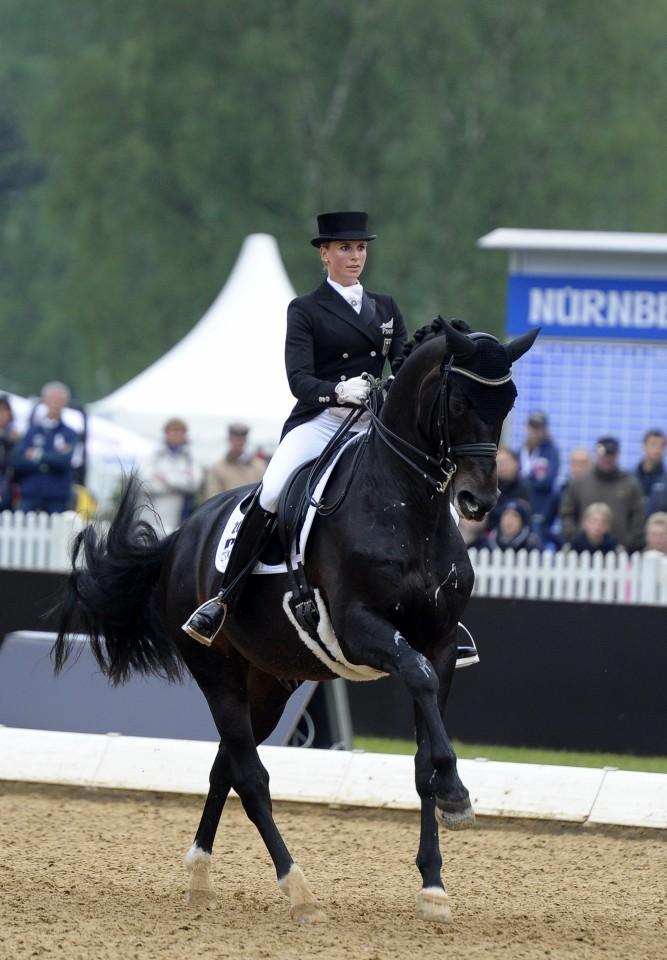
German dressage rider Jessica von Bredow-Werndl with Unee BB, at the 2015 CDI5* Pferd International Munich-Riem

The German government actively supports and finances its equestrian industry at the European level; however, associations within the sector do not receive subsidies. Over 1.5 million Germans ride horses, making the German Equestrian Federation a significant player on the international stage. In 2017, the estimated number of riders was 1.17 million. Of these, 42% were recreational riders, 26% practiced for recreation and minor competitions, and 26% were competition riders. 697,126 of these riders have a sports license.

Each year, Germany hosts approximately 3,600 equestrian events featuring 69,000 different competitions. Additionally, 2,400 German horses possess passports from the International Federation for Equestrian Sports and therefore compete internationally; German dressage riders have won numerous prizes worldwide.

Horse racing is managed independently by a national branch of the Jockey Club while trotting events are overseen by the Hauptverband für Traber-zucht e.V. (HVT). The racing industry is in decline.

== Horse breeding ==
In the 2010s, Germany's horse population exceeded one million, making it the European country with the highest number of horses, though not the highest density. By 2015, the equine population, which includes donkeys, was approximately 1,200,000. In 2008, the density of horses in Germany was reported at 12.1 per 1,000 inhabitants.

The warm climate, influenced by the Gulf Stream, provides a favorable environment for horse breeding in western Germany. In contrast, the climate in the eastern and southern regions is less conducive to breeding. As a result, most horses are bred along the Rhine Valley. Germany has 9 federal stud farms (Langestüt), financed and managed by the federal states (länder), which organize the breeding on a regional level, particularly by supporting and promoting horse breeds specific to each state. These studs act as stallions, organize qualification events to evaluate breeding stock, and buy young foals yearly. Approximately 700 stallions are owned by the federal studs, representing about 20% of the licensed breeding stallions in the country.

=== Saddle and sport horses ===
Sport horse breeding is the main sector, with German saddle and sport horses being especially renowned and sought after. The most important studbooks are Hanoverian, Holsteiner, and Oldenburger. Purebred racehorse breeding accounts for about 750 births yearly, ranking 4th in Europe. Additionally, Germany has a substantial population of Arabian horses.

=== Ponies ===
The Haflinger is the predominant sport pony breed in Germany. The country also breeds ponies from neighboring European countries, including the Huçul and Shetland, which have considerable populations.

=== Draft horses ===
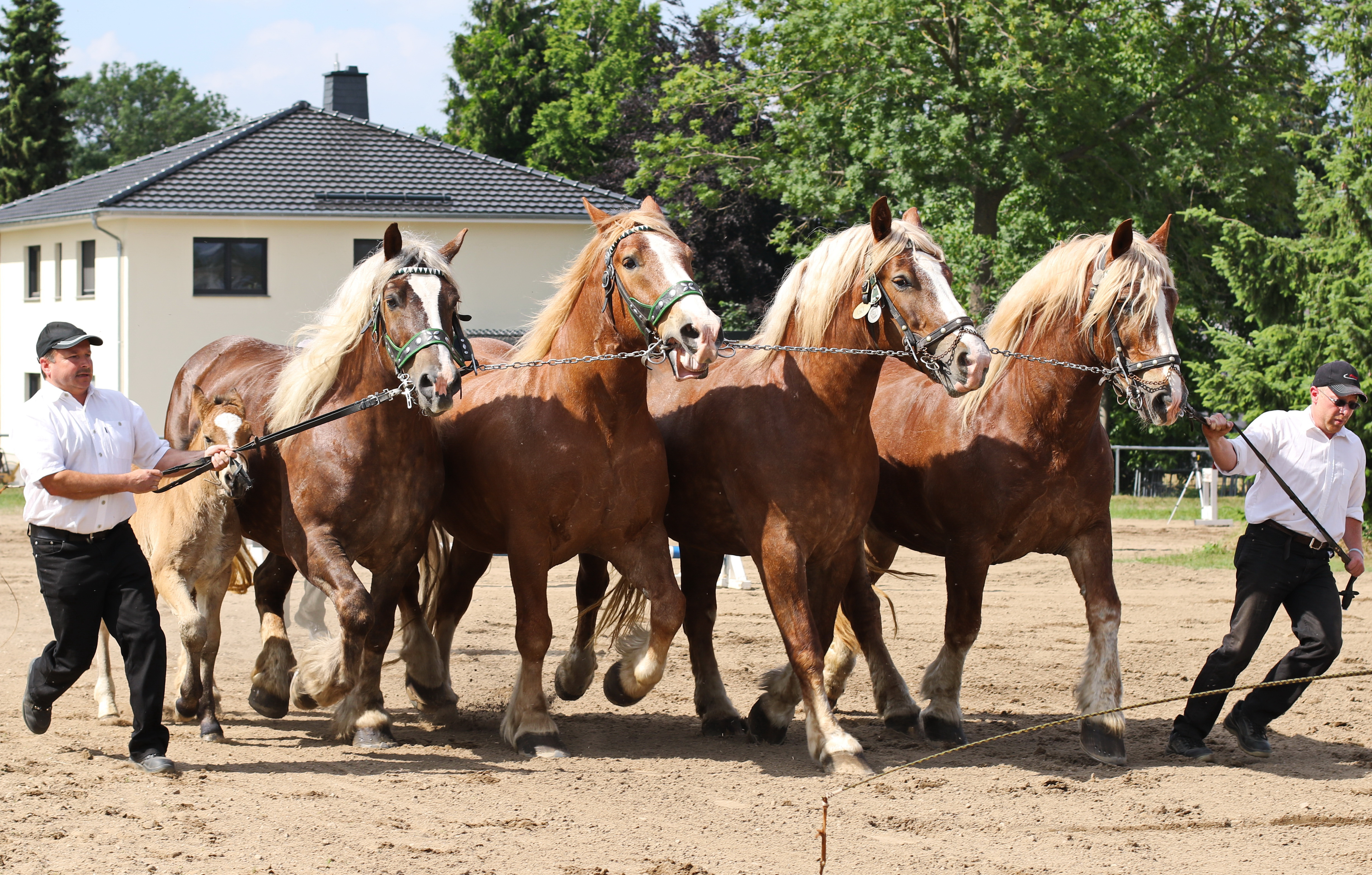
Display of draft horses in Jahnsdorf, Erzgebirge, Saxony

Germany has a wide variety of draft horses, all of which are small breeds. Among these, the South German Coldblood (Oberländer) is the most populous and, as of 2004, is the only breed not at risk of extinction; it is also genetically distinct from other German draft horses.

=== Extinct breeds ===
Many German breeds are now extinct. These include the Emscherbrücher, Davertnickel, and Beberbecker.

Other German breeds, due to their poor characterization and small numbers, have been merged into the studbook of other breeds, such as the Bavarian Warmblood, Hessian, Saxony-Anhalt, Thuringian Saddlebred, Württemberger and Zweibrücker.

== Culture ==
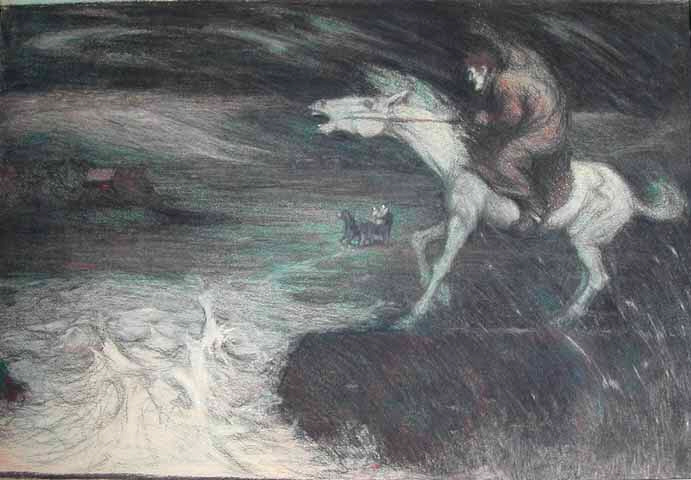
Franz Karl Basler-Kopp, Schimmelreiter I

The horse holds significant importance in Germanic beliefs. According to Marc-André Wagner, it has historically been regarded as an oracle that foretells death. The omen of death was the dominant interpretation of a vision of a horse. The behavior of horses in nineteenth-century Germania was also seen as meaningful: for instance, a man was believed to be at risk of death if a horse shook its harness nervously; a funeral procession was anticipated if the horse shook its head and ruffled its mane; and if a horse refused to pass in front of an individual, it signified that the occupant of the house would soon die. Additionally, it was believed that anyone who saw a horse through a window would face imminent death. In the folklore of Lower Saxony and the Altmark, the "Schimmelreiter" is depicted as an ominous white horse or rider, symbolizing maritime disasters that breach dikes during storms.

The horse is also widely associated with notions of prosperity, luck, fertility, and good news, a legacy of the divinatory practices of hippomancy. The Brothers Grimm's tale of Ferdinand the Faithful and Ferdinand the Unfaithful tells of a man who receives a prophetic white horse that speaks, and can help and warn him. Jacob Grimm notes a Lower Saxon tradition of decorating the roof structure with wooden horse heads to protect against evil.
