= Kurdish horse =

Breed of horse

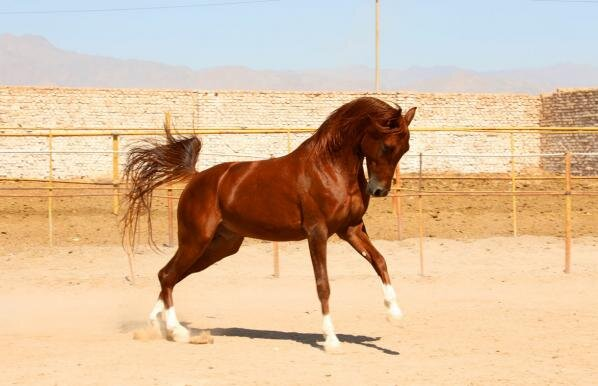
- Distribution: All over Kurdistan, most commonly in Iranian Kurdistan

Traits
- Color: Various colors, including white, black, buckskin, brown, grey, and mixed.

The Kurdish horse (Kurdish: ئەسپی کورد, romanized: Espî Kurd) or the Kurd horse, is the traditional horse breed of the Kurds. The horse is native to Greater Kurdistan and is found all throughout it. The breed originated from Iranian Kurdistan and is one of the national breeds of Iran, alongside the Caspian, Turkoman, Assil, and Dareshuri.

== Characteristics ==
The Kurdish horse has a medium height (140 to 155 cm) and a compact, muscular body with sturdy bone structure. It has very thick skin and a dense coat as well as a thick mane and tail. As opposed to other native Iranian horse breeds such as the Turkoman, which have long backs and a skinnier length, the Kurdish horse has a stocky body structure. The Kurdish horse has large eyes that are deep in its socket, and for the most they are not prominent, although some strains of the breed have more prominent eyes. Its eyes are more oval-shaped. The Kurdish horse appears to have a shorter neck, although its neck is of an average height and appears short due to being wide, broad, and muscular. It has muscular shoulders, and a wide chest. It holds its neck in an upright position. The breed is known for having a high tail and head carriage. Its ears are set wide on the poll and are of medium length, however they may appear small due to their thick forelock. Their ears' auricles (pinna) are wide open. The Kurdish horse is an active and passionate breed. The Kurdish horse also had very tough hooves that rarely required shoes, and survived on sparse grazing.

== History ==
The proto-Kurds had bred a particular strain of horse which adapted to the harsh mountainous conditions of Kurdistan. The Kurdish horse was believed to be descended from a variety of ancient horses in the Zagros, namely an extinct breed of horse named "Nesayee" in Iran. As of 2022, the Kurdish horse population in Iran only was estimated at 2,700 individuals. The Kurdish horse was first bred in the area near Kermanshah, and quickly spread among the Kurdish tribes all throughout the Kurdish regions of Iraq, Turkey, and Syria. The horse survived in moderately-cold climates and mountainous regions, which have made it resistant to harsh environmental conditions. During the Ayyubid era, Kurdish horses were valued for their strength, surefootedness, and ability to navigate steep mountain passes. Some sources distinguished the horses ridden by Ayyubid Kurdish contingents from other horses, describing them as "light and mountain-born," suited to skirmish tactics. Arabian horses were bred primarily for speed and beauty in desert raids, whereas Kurdish horses were stockier and slower but stronger and capable of carrying heavier loads over rougher terrain. Kurdish tribes historically rejected Persian horse breeding standards, claiming that they valued aesthetics over practicality. Henry Rawlinson, writing about his 1830s journey through western Iran, described the Kurdish horses as "fleet, wiry, and admirably suited for mountain warfare." The horse also held strong symbolic and cultural value in Kurdish tribal society. Kurdish oral traditions, epics, and songs often portrayed the horse as prized possessions, sometimes equating it with honor and masculinity. In many Kurdish tribes, a horse was part of a marital dowry or served as an important gift in tribal alliances. Kurds historically bred horses within tribal networks rather than centralized state-owned studs.

During the Simko Shikak revolt, many observers noted the "unusually fast and mountain-adapted" horses that Simko Shikak and his soldiers rode. Mustafa Barzani, during his exile in the Soviet Uzbekistan, had personally brought his horse with him, viewing it as a symbol of the struggle. Mahmud Barzanji, who led multiple revolts against British rule in the 1920s, owned a horse which his followers believed sensed danger and guided them away from many ambushes. Kurds mourned their horses that died in battle and preserved their memory in oral tradition.

In Safavid sources, Kurdish cavalrymen were known for surprise tactics, enabled by the speed and terrain-adaptability of their horses. Ottoman military sources complained of the difficulty of pursuing Kurdish rebels due to "their intimate knowledge of the passes and the speed of their mounts". British travelers such as Claudius Rich and Austen Henry Layard commented on the quality of Kurdish horses and mentioned how Kurds bred horses in a different way from Arabs or Persians, with Claudius Rich writing that "the Kurds ride as though born in the saddle, and their horses are better suited to the rocks and heights than any I have encountered." With the disintegration of the Ottoman Empire and the emergence of modern nation-states, Kurdish warfare shifted from traditional tribal conflicts to modern resistance movements. Kurdish horses remained vital in Kurdish uprisings, especially in transporting arms, medicine, and messages through the highlands to Kurdish units in extreme isolation. During the Mahmud Barzanji revolt, British intelligence reports noted that "Kurdish horsemen possess a tenacity in hill warfare that British infantry find impossible to match." Kurdish women regularly rode horses and it was not seen as a taboo among Kurds as it was among other Middle Eastern cultures. Moreover, Kurdish oral tradition regularly praised the horses for their role in the daily lives of Kurds. Famous historic horses were often mentioned by name and granted nearly human status.

In the 20th century, many traditional breeding networks for the horse breed were eroded during the Turkish government sedentarization and Turkification project and Anfal campaign. During the 1970s and 1980s, the Iraqi Ministry of Agriculture deliberately avoided using the term "Kurdish horse" in official documentation. Instead, they referred to it as a "northern mountain breed" or "Sulaymaniyah type". Many Kurdish horses were confiscated by the Iraqi state. In Turkish state zoological reports, Kurdish horses were often lumped under categories such as "Anatolian mountain horses" or "Hakkari pack horses," stripping them of any designation that referenced Kurds. Turkish cavalry handbooks from the early Republican period referred to horses of Kurdish tribes only by geographic terms. Under both the Pahlavi regime and the Islamic Republic, equine registries maintained by the Rural Development Ministry often recorded Kurdish horses as "western Zagros types." Furthermore, in Iranian national horse breeding, Kurdish horses were marginalized in favor of Arab or Turkoman lines. In equine sports and exhibitions, the ethnic background of Kurdish breeders was also deliberately omitted. After the 1979 revolution, Iran banned tribal horse shows in Kurdish cities.

Due to the rise of vehicles, war, and several government attempts to erase the horse, the Kurdish horse breed took much damage during the 20th and 21st centuries. However, it survived due to the efforts of rural Kurds, as well as Kurdish organizations who began programs to breed more horses, document their genetics, and work with international equine organizations to gain official status for the Kurdish horse.

During the 2000s, Kurdish tribal horse breeding began resurfacing in Iran, although under heavy government surveillance.

In 2019, Iran hosted the first National Kurdish Horse Beauty Festival in Ardebil province. In December 2022, Iran announced they were developing a dossier for the horse for a possible inscription on the UNESCO World Heritage list. In January 2023, the Kurdish horse was added to the National Intangible Cultural Heritage list of Iran. A two-day festival dedicated to the breed was held in Kermanshah province in July 2023. A festival was also held for it during November 2023 in Sulaymaniyah. In November 2023, Iran and Iraq announced they were seeking a shared UNESCO status for the breed. In May 2024, a third festival was held to celebrate the breed in Sulaymaniyah.

== See also ==
- Horses in Iran
