= Horses in Iran =

Equine culture in Iran

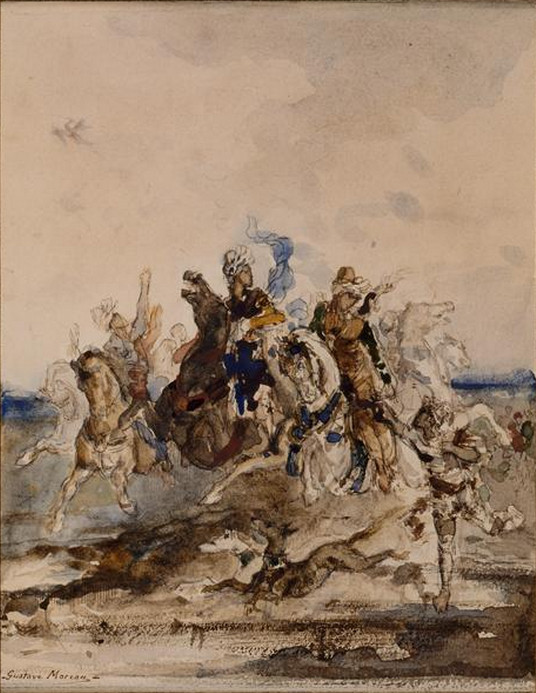
Darius's horse neighs in the sunlight. This drawing by Gustave Moreau depicts a famous Persian hippomancy scene.

The history of horses in Iran goes back to Greek sources from ancient Persia, which mention horse worship and the practice of hippomancy. Today, Iranians breed several breeds of horse, in particular the Koheilan and Saklawi lines.

== History ==
Horses played an important cultural role in ancient Persia. Herodotus and Ctesias attest to the practice of hippomancy (divination by horse), which continued into the Sasanian era. According to Herodotus' Histories, the Nisean horse was considered sacred in the 5th century BC.

Darius the Great exploited this Persian belief in hippomancy to ensure his royal legitimacy. It is possible that Darius used this ruse or propagated the story to appease his people, who strongly believed in hippomancy.

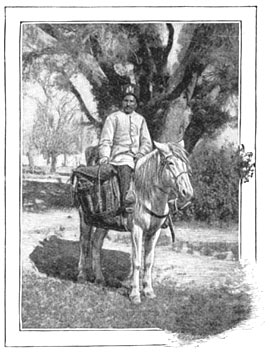
A Persian pony in 1906

Georges Dumézil sees it as a possible Indo-European rite of enthronement. Persian military horsemen may also have been diviners.

In 1965, an American, Louise Firouz, rediscovered the Caspian horse in the Alborz mountains, on the shores of the Caspian Sea. In the 1970s, the Royal Iranian Horse Society proposed the name "Persian plateau horse" to designate a group of fairly heterogeneous horses bred in the tribal areas of the Iranian plateau with various Indo-European influences.

== Breeding ==
The DAD-IS database lists 21 breeds of horse currently or formerly bred in Iran: Bakhtiari, Basseri, Caspian, Dareshuri, Ebian, Haddian, Hamdani, Iranian horse, Jaf, Kahilan, Kurdish horse, Persian, Qarabagh, Qashqai, Saklawi, Shirazi, Sistani, Taleshi, Taropud, Turkemin and Yabu.

The CAB International study (2016) distinguishes three main types or breeds of horse in Iran: the Persian, the Persian Plateau horse and the Turkoman, divided into numerous subtypes, whose characterisations remain unclear. It also mentions the existence of the Tchenaran horse.

== Bibliography ==
- Hendricks, Bonnie (2007). International Encyclopedia of Horse Breeds (2nd ed.). Norman: University of Oklahoma Press. ISBN 978-0-8061-3884-8.
- Porter, Valerie; Alderson, Lawrence; Hall, Stephen; Sponenberg, Dan (2016). Mason's World Encyclopedia of Livestock Breeds and Breeding (6th ed.). CAB International. ISBN 978-1-84593-466-8.
