= Dareshuri =

Oriental horse breed form Iran

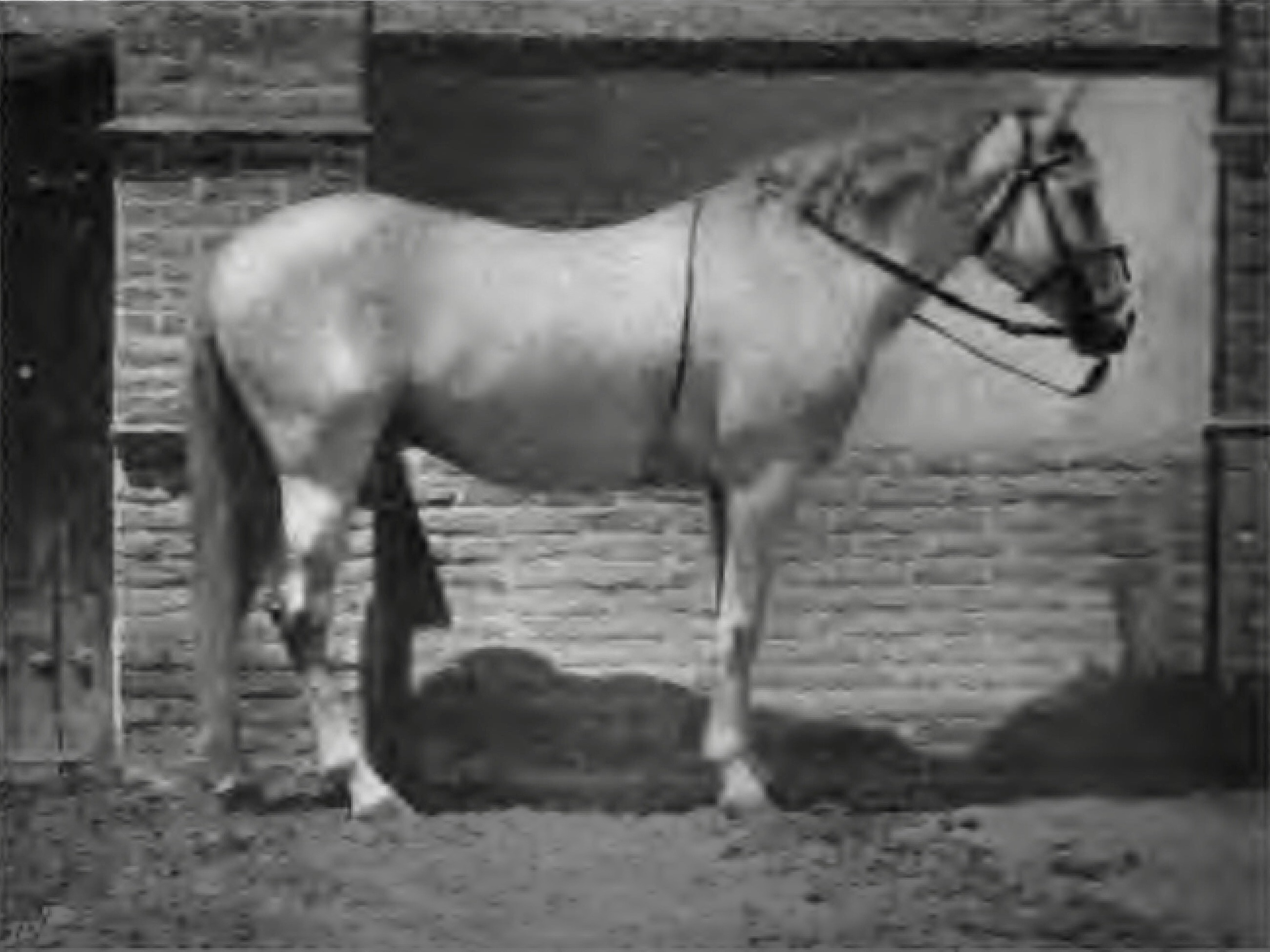
- Photograph from about 1900
- Conservation status: FAO (2007); endangered; DAD-IS (2023): unknown
- Other names: Dareh shuri; Shirazi
- Country of origin: Iran
- Distribution: Fars province
- Use: riding; driving

Traits
- Height: 1.50–1.55 m
- Color: bay, chestnut or gray

The Dareshuri is an Iranian breed of riding horse of oriental type. It is native to Fars province in southern Iran and is associated with the Turkic Qashqai people of that area, particularly with the Dareshuri tribe for which it is named. It may also be known as the Shirazi after the city of Shiraz, the provincial capital.

It is an endangered breed: a population of 300–400 was reported in 2003. Its conservation status in 2007 was 'endangered'; in 2023 it was 'unknown'.

== History ==
The origins of the Dareshuri are unknown. It is a traditional breed, closely associated with the Qashqai people of Fars province in southern Iran, and particularly with the Dareshuri tribe for which it is named.

The traditional semi-annual migrations of the Qashgai people from their winter pastures to the south and west of the city of Shiraz to their summer grazing grounds in the mountains to the north and west of the city lasted some four to six weeks and covered many hundreds of kilometres. These journeys exerted a powerful selection for qualities of stamina and endurance in their horses. In the nineteenth century Shirazi horses were cross-bred from local Persian mares and Arab stallions from Baghdad; many were exported to India, where they were known by the name 'Gulf Arab'. In the twentieth century the Dareshuri renewed the blood of their horses through frequent inter-breeding with Persian Arab stock from Khuzestan, often through Bakhtiari middlemen; preference was given to horses of the Khersani matrilineal strain.

The breed came to prominence under the impetus of Dareshuri tribal chiefs Ziad Khan and Hossein Khan, and later Ayaz Khan, in the late 1970s, as part of the categorization and study of Persian Arabian horses. Members of the Dareshuri tribe insist on their Mongolian ancestry, and claim to have traveled between Iran and Syria in the time of Genghis Khan, before returning to Iran with the best Syrian Arabian horses they could find there. However, this claim is not supported by written pedigree documents, and therefore cannot be proven.

Genetic analysis of the principal Iranian horse breeds finds them to form a group distinct from other horses; within that group the Dareshuri is closest to the Persian Arab.

== Characteristics ==
According to CAB International, the Dareshuri belongs to the Persian plateau horse group.

The average height is 1.50 to 1.55 m, making it one of the largest Persian horses.

The morphology is said to be dis-harmonious. The head has a rectilinear profile, concave (typical Arabian), with an eye that can be small, and a cheek bone that is narrower than in the Arabian asil. The body is slender and light, the rib cage shallow, the tail set low. The limbs are slender, ending in hard hooves. The fine skin is covered with fine, silky hair. Mane and tail are sparse, but with fine manes.

The coat can be bay, seal brown, chestnut or gray, very rarely black. Markings are common.

The Dareshuri is known for its docility and ease of training, proving fast and lively. Gaits are renowned for their quality. The Dareshuri's original mountain landscape is particularly rugged, which has given the breed stamina and endurance.

== Usage ==
DAD-IS indicates its main use as a transport horse; according to Kholová, it is mainly used as a saddle horse. However, a Turkish veterinary document indicates a use as a driving horse.

== Range ==
The Darashouri is listed among the horse breeds of Iran, with DAD-IS classifying it as a local Iranian breed. The Dareshuri is in fact an indigenous Iranian breed, specific to the province of Fars, north of Shiraz and therefore in southern Iran. It is not found outside the borders of its native country.

== See also ==
- Horses in Iran
- List of horse breeds

== Bibliography ==
- Kholová, Helena (1997). Chevaux (in French). Paris: Éditions Gründ.
- Peplow, Elizabeth (1998). Encyclopedia of the horse. Octopus Publishing Group, Ltd.
