= Neigh =

Sound made by horses, hinnies, and other equines

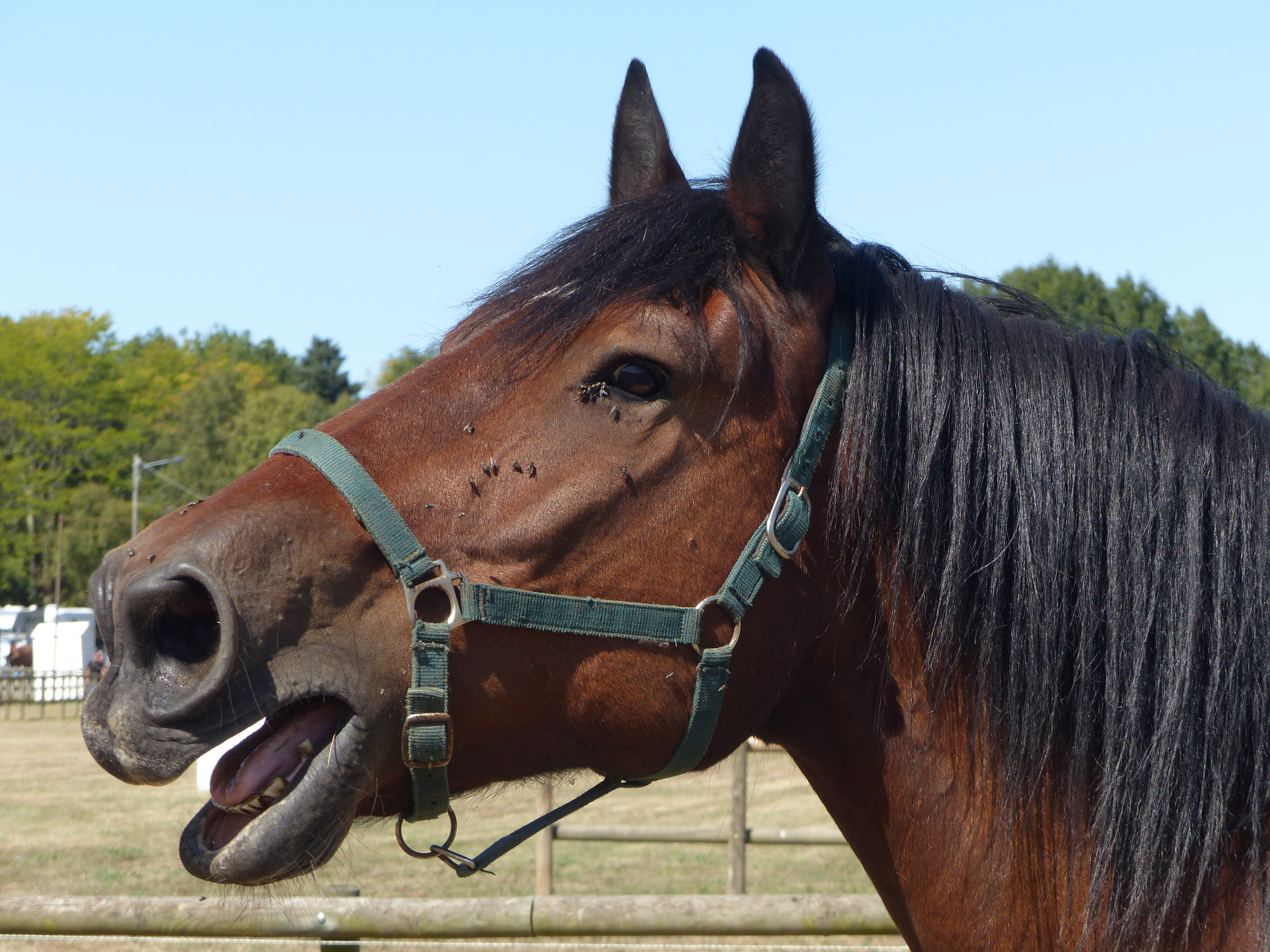
A horse neighing

A neigh or a whinny is the sound made by horses, horse hybrids such as the hinny, and other equines, such as the zebra. It consists of a succession of jerky sounds, initially high-pitched and gradually lower. Produced on exhalation by the larynx and modulated, it enables the animal to express its emotions (such as fear or satisfaction) and to inform other animals through the sound produced. The main function of neighing is to alert other equines to its presence in the absence of visual communication.

Buffon established a classification of neighs into five categories, according to the emotion expressed by the horse, which has been widely used in subsequent works.

In literary works, the horse neigh is often the means by which it makes itself known to its rider and communicates with them. In divination practices, examination of the sound produced and the horse's attitude has given rise to hippomancy. Horse neigh plays a particularly important role in Tibetan Buddhist beliefs.

== Etymology and terminology ==
In English and other Germanic languages, the Middle High German nēgen gave rise to the Old English hnǣgan and Middle English neyen, then the modern English verb 'to neigh'. As in French, its use is attested before the 11th century. In the Tibetan language, gsaṅs refers to voice in a general sense, and skad-gsaṅs to neigh, i.e., literally, "the horse's voice". Tibetan dictionaries distinguish between two types of neighing, the one that resounds and the other one that becomes faint. In English, a similar distinction exists between nickering, whinnying and neighing, which designate three types of neighing. This terminological distinction does not exist in French.

In French, hennissement is a masculine noun that, according to the Trésor de la langue Française informatisé, was attested in the 13th century and it is in the Histoire de l'empereur Henri de Constantinopled by Henry of Valenciennes (a text dated around 1220). Hennissement is derived from the verb hennir, attested in 1100 for human beings, and 30 years later for the "cry of a horse", in Philippe de Thaon's Bestiaire. Moreover, hennir is a borrowing from the Latin hinnire which, as Quintilian notes in his Institutio Oratoria, is formed on an onomatopoeia of the "horse cry": the repetition of the vowel "i" evokes the sound of neighing. Other Romance verbs, such as the Italian nitrire, derive from it. An influence from Frankish kinni, meaning jaw, is also possible. The hinny neighs like a horse, while the mule bray like a donkey. In French, hennissement and hennir are also used for the zebra.

== History ==
In Western Europe, Buffon's study of horses, in which he follows Cardan, describes five types of neighs. This study has been an authority for centuries, and it is included in Encyclopédie, ou dicctionnaire raisonné des sciences, des arts et de métiers, among others. According to him, these five horse neighs are used to express joy, desire, anger, fear, and pain, respectively. The five types of neighs are as follows:

- the neigh of joy, in which the voice is heard for quite a long time, rising and ending on higher notes. The horse kicks at the same time, but lightly, and does not try to strike;
- the neigh of desire, love, and affection, in which the horse doesn't kick. It is heard for a long time, and the voice ends with lower, faster sounds;
- the neigh of anger, during which the horse kicks and strikes dangerously, very short and high-pitched;
- the neigh of fear, during which he also kicks, is hardly longer than that of anger. The voice is low, hoarse and seems to come entirely from the nostrils. This neigh is quite similar to the lion's roar; and
- the neigh of pain, less a neigh than a whinny, which is low-pitched and follows breathing.

This classification, very popular and widely used, is no longer valid today.

According to some 19th-century encyclopedias, in some countries, particularly Hungary, it was customary to split the horse's nostrils to prevent neighing, particularly in times of war. This information is modified by the fact that neighing is modulated in the larynx. The splitting of a donkey's nostril to prevent braying is, however, well attested during the World War I.

== Description ==
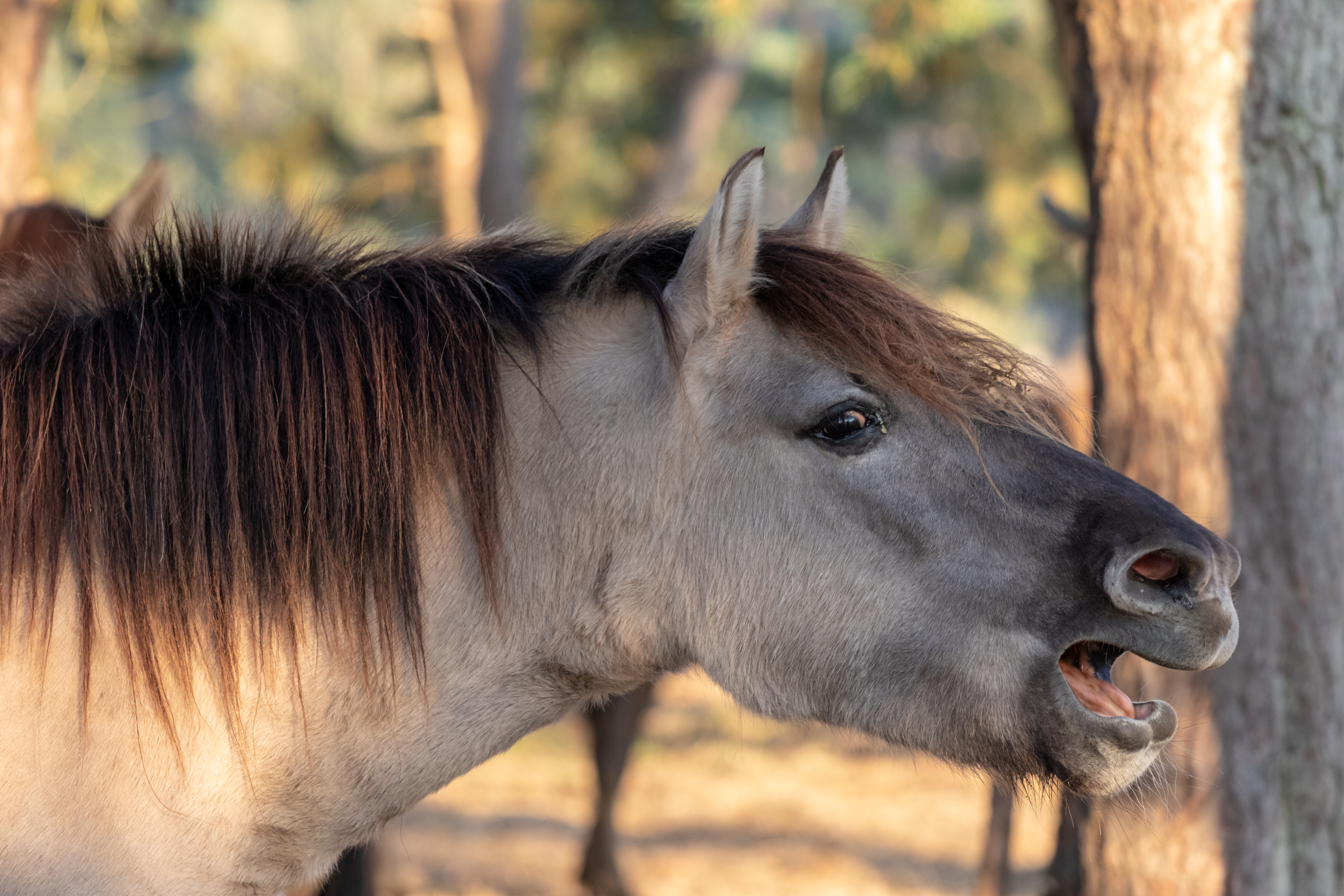
A horse neighing

The neigh is a succession of jerky sounds, first high-pitched, then gradually lower, producing a sort of long "Hiiiihiiiihiii". Intensity and pitch can vary considerably. It can be so loud that it can be heard by the human ear from a distance of several kilometres (few miles), which means that horses, whose hearing is better developed, can hear it from an even greater distance. When a horse neighs, it opens its mouth, and its jaw and nostrils move. Neighing is more frequent in the entire horse than in the mare and gelding, and the timbre of their voices is not as strong. From birth, the male has a louder voice than the female. By the age of two or two-and-a-half, when puberty sets in, the voice of all horses becomes louder. The horse's vocalizations have complex sounds, a wide bandwidth and varied frequencies, making them richer than those of most domestic animals. Although the name "neigh" is generally applied to the horse's call, the hinny, a hybrid of stallion and donkey, readily neighs like a horse, while the mule, a hybrid of donkey and mare, is more likely to bray.

=== Mechanism ===
The horse neighs by inhaling to fill its lungs and then expelling the air that passes through its larynx. Neighing occurs in the larynx during exhalation, which is why horses with an open esophagus are unable to neigh, as the air no longer passes through it. The other parts of the respiratory system contribute to neighing in a secondary way. The lungs expel air into the larynx via the trachea. The pharynx and nasal cavities add power to the vocalization and modify it. The air expelled from the lungs pushes the lips away from the glottis, until the vocal cords return on themselves and momentarily close the respiratory tract, only to spread apart again, producing vibratory movements fast enough to give rise to sounds, much as happens when you blow into the reed of an oboe. The horse's throat, mouth and lips modify the nature of the sound emitted, while the power of the neigh is determined by the force with which air is expelled from the lungs.

=== Special features ===
The Haflinger breed, originally from the Tyrol in the Alps, is said by its breeders to have a wider range of neighs than other horses. This may be due to the fact that, in mountainous environments, horses have difficulty seeing each other and rely more on auditory communication.

=== Function and emotions ===
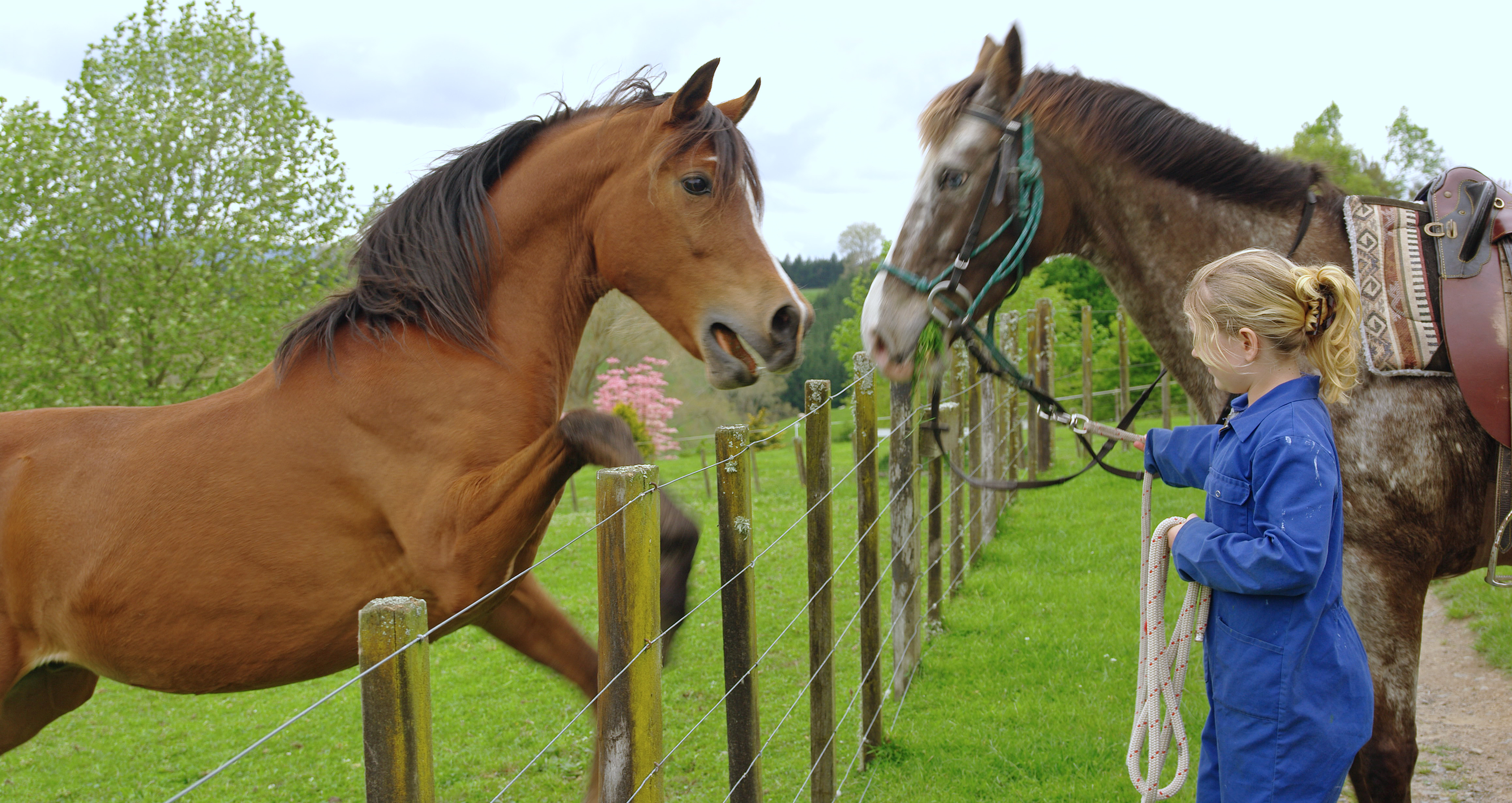
A stallion neighing with excitement at a mare

Neighing is one of the horse's means of communication, but far from the most widely used. Not resorting to neighing is a precaution against possible predators of this large herbivore, who might spot potential prey by the sound. Horses mainly use body language. They only resort to neighing in very specific cases, notably when they can't see other horses to decipher their movements. The primary function of neighing is to allow the animal to call other horses it can't see.

Horses use neighing a lot during their infancy. When Przewalski's foals wake up, they neigh and receive a response from their mother, more rarely from another horse. They may try to locate the source of adult horses' neighing. The mare calls its foal by neighing if it wanders too far away, and the foal who is looking for its mother calls it in the same way: each probably recognizes the other's neigh very clearly.

Horse neighs are also a way for them to express their intentions, concerns and satisfactions, generally when these give rise to strong emotions, such as those experienced by two stallions fighting, or a stallion who senses and approaches a mare. There are differences depending on the sensations the animal feels and communicates. Researchers have studied the emotions that horses communicate to other horses when they neigh: while the tone is constant, the harmonics are varied and increase in proportion to anxiety. Frequency plays a role in communication.

==== Neigh of satisfaction ====
This neigh is rather low-pitched and soft. It's a sign of friendship, emitted mainly at mealtimes, and also by the mare to reassure its foal. According to English-speaking authors, this type of neighing is divided into two quite distinct types. Whinnying refers to the neigh of satisfaction, a form of recognition that expresses the horse's joy. Nickering is the mare's neigh to reassure its foal, but can also be emitted by horses in the presence of people they particularly like: the animal then expresses its satisfaction at being at the person's side. The first type of neigh is louder and higher-pitched than the second.

==== Neigh of worry and for calling ====
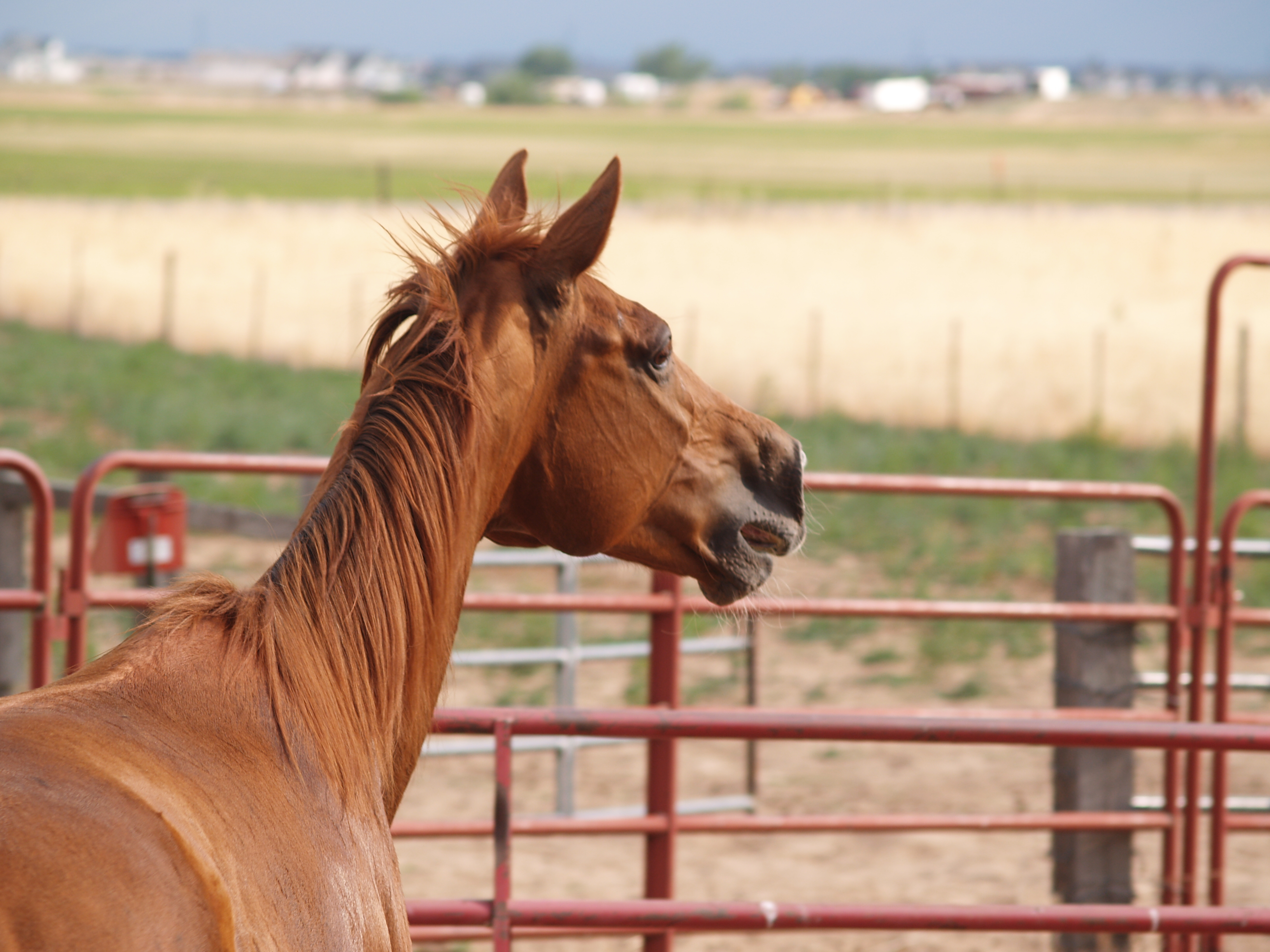
A mare neighing to call one of its fellow horses, a short distance away

This neigh is much louder and higher-pitched, and can be heard from a great distance. It can be heard by a worried animal preparing to flee, or by a horse separated from its companions, looking for signs of other horses in the vicinity. The animal is waiting for a response that will provide the information it is seeking. This cry is easily recognizable, deafening a person standing next to the horse at the same time. The animal emitting it generally adopts a very specific position, raising its head to clear its throat, which increases the power of the sound produced. Brood mares often neigh to call their foals close to them when they stray too far.

==== Other sounds ====
Other sounds produced by the horse are not neighs, but squeaks of mirth or pain, or whinnies of suffering. The loudest squeak is also a threat: it indicates that the horse is about to express its anger physically, for example during a group feeding or when a mare pushes a stallion away.

== In culture ==
As with all animals in human contact, the horse neigh can take on a variety of symbolic meanings. It plays a role in hippomancy, myths, tales, legends and popular texts. According to dream interpretations, neighing heralds news of a friend or a happy event to be celebrated among friends. In the visual arts, the rendering of a horse's neighing is particularly elaborate in Picasso's Guernica, in which the horse neigh is intended to convey the pain of an entire people. Films, especially westerns, frequently add recorded neighs to scenes with horses, which can give the false impression that the animal makes extensive use of this mode of communication.

=== Music ===
A frequent theme in modern Greek folk songs is that of the woman who hears a horse neigh and recognizes the cry of her husband's mount, but not the man she has just spent the night with, whom she believes to be her lover. The neighing acts as a catalyst, preceding the punishment of the adulterous wife. In other songs, the neighing may be a decoy, a love code, an instrument of recognition to identify the horse rider, or a tribute from the equine to its departed master. All these meanings testify to the deep relationship between man and horse.

=== Literature ===
[...] as we trudged along, I thought I heard a horse neighing from a group of black fir trees. Is that the wind blowing through those branches? No, it isn't! Here comes a troop of cavalry from the forest. — Lord Byron, Mazeppa

In the Roman d'Alexandre, the fifteen-year-old future king passes the place where the terrible Bucephalus is confined one day and hears a loud neigh. When he asks which animal it belongs to, one of his father's men replies that Bucephalus is locked up there because it feeds on human flesh, making it very dangerous. When he hears Alexander's voice, Bucéphale lets out another neigh, this time very soft, and leans towards the young man he recognizes as his master.

One of the impressives of the Japanese language is that of a group of horses neighing to greet the departure or arrival of a person they recognize. In Ronsard's poem L'Ombre du cheval, the neighing gives a form of reality to an imaginary painting horse seen in a dream: the neighing awakens its master, becoming a clue to the animal's possible reality. Le vent du Nord set come le hennissement d'un Cheval noir is a 40-page story from the manga series Sabu to Ichi Torimono Hikae (1966-1972) by Shōtarō Ishinomori.

=== Beliefs, legends and divination ===
Neighing can be an indicator in hippomancy, divination using horses. As with coat characteristics and white markings, various popular beliefs attribute qualities to the horse's neighing. According to French belief in the mid-nineteenth century, horses that neigh most often, especially with joy and desire, are the best and most generous.

==== Buddhism and Hinduism ====
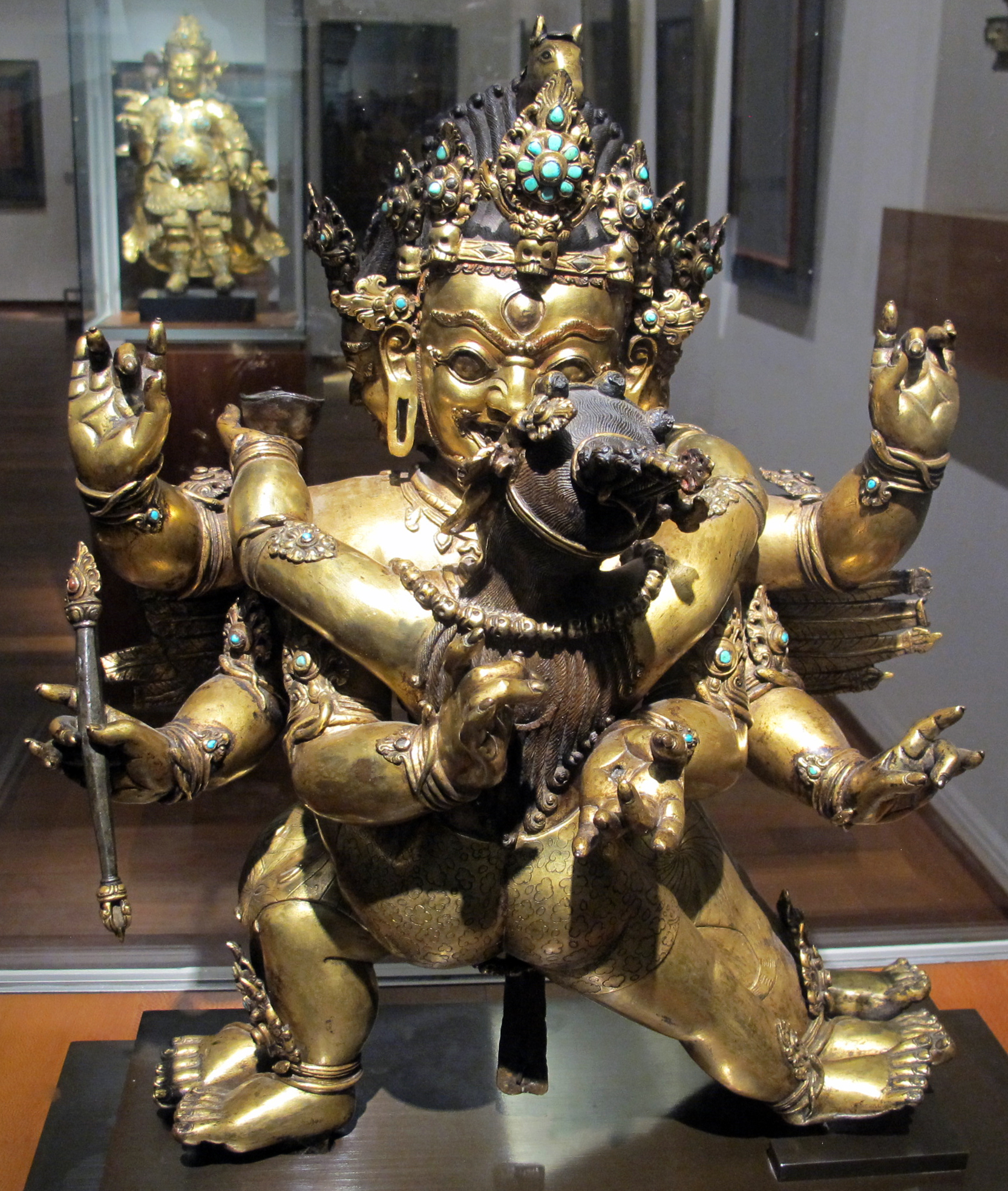
Hayagriva, deity surmounted by the head of a neighing horse

The horse neigh is a symbol of the wrathful Buddhist deity Hayagriva, whose head is surmounted by one to three green-necked neighing horses. This frightens Māra, Gautama buddha's tempting demon (as well as his avatars), and restores his faith in attaining enlightenment. Ash-Vagosha, whose name means "horse neigh", was a renowned Indian Buddhist of the 1st century, who wrote a biography of the Buddha. In Hinduism, thunder is created when Indra's chariot passes by, by the neighing of his horses.

==== Tibet ====
Various beliefs relating to neighs are particularly well documented in Tibet. According to the Tibetan hippologists who wrote the Touen-houang manuscripts (800-1035), a horse neigh sound comes from the wind, the force of life, from the base of its navel to its mouth. Depending on the sound and position of the horse when it neighs, it can be a good or bad omen for its master. Neighs that imitate the sound of a conch shell, large drum, lion, tiger, chariot roll, flute, bull, thunder or river; are signs of good fortune, especially if the animal lowers its head or turns it to the left when neighing. Similarly, a horse that neighs a lot when accompanying others, or makes others neigh, is a good sign. Conversely, if a horse neighs a lot while looking around, or if its cry resembles a donkey's bray, then it's a bad omen. A bad horse is one that imitates the cry of a camel, vulture, cat, jackal, dog, crow, monkey or owl. A horse that neighs when looking to the right or when touched, and is ridden by a king, promises its rider to rule the whole Earth. A sick horse, on the other hand, will soon die if it neighs while looking and breathing sideways. Finally, Tibetan hippologists recommend not to draw omens from very young, very old, sick, hungry or thirsty horses, but to pay close attention to neighing in all other cases.

==== Hippomancy in the West ====
Divination by means of neighing is also practiced in the West, but is less well documented. In his Dictionnaire Infernal, Collin de Plancy speaks of Celtic hippomancy, thanks to the neighing and movement of white horses fed and kept in consecrated forests, considered to be the guardians of divine secrets. In his Morales sur le livre de Job, Pope Gregory I describes the horse as a true preacher, and its neigh as the voice of preaching. The myth of Balius and Xanthus, the horses of Achilles, one of which speaks and predicts the death of its master, provides some evidence of hippomancy through neighing.

==== Darius' horse ====
According to a legend recounted by Herodotus, the neighing of a horse plays a major role in the choice of government in ancient Persia. As seven conspirators were unable to agree on the preferable form of government, it was decided that they would all ride to the same place the next morning before sunrise, and that whoever's horse was first to neigh in greeting to the sun would be made King of the Persians. Darius' squire learns of this, and cheats by leading his master's stallion to a mare placed where he will be the next morning. When Darius' horse arrives before sunrise, the smell and memory of the previous day's mare cause him to neigh with joy, and the kingdom falls to his master. The six other conspirators dismount and proclaim Darius I king of the Persians. In reality, Darius was probably chosen by consensus among the conspirators, but this legend illustrates the importance of the horse's neigh in defining the future king.

== See also ==
- List of animal sounds

== Bibliography ==
- Cardini, Joseph (1845). "Hennissement". Dictionnaire d'hippiatrique et d'équitation (in French). Bouchard-Huzard.
- Vallon, Alexandre-Bernard (1863). "Voix". Cours d'hippologie à l'usage de MM. les officiers de l'armée (in French). Javaud.
- Blondeau, Anne Marie; Pelliot, Paul (1972). "Examen du hennissement". Matériaux pour l'étude de l'hippologie et de l'hippiatrie tibétaines : à partir des manuscrits de Touen-houang (in French). Centre de recherche d'histoire et de philologie de la Section de l'École pratique des hautes études, Librairie Droz. ISBN 2600033025.
- Becker, Marty (2010). "What's the difference between nickering, whinnying and neighing?". Why Do Horses Sleep Standing Up? (in French). Hachette UK. ISBN 978-1409131359.
