= Hippomancy =

Ancient divination method through horses

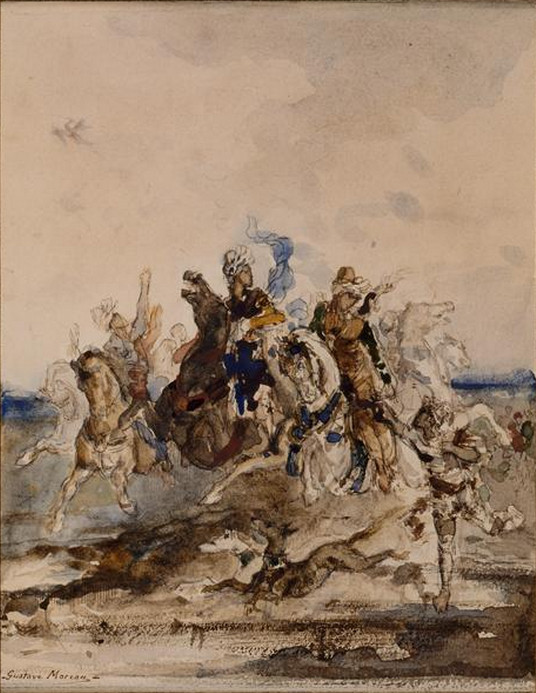
Darius's horse neighs in the sunlight. This drawing by Gustave Moreau depicts a famous hippomancy scene.

Hippomancy is the art of divination through the horse, whether it involves interpreting the animal's movements or neighing, the tracks it leaves, or its bones. Throughout much of history, the horse was seen as an intermediary between Man, Nature, and the gods. The horse was thought to have diviner or oracle powers, often as part of cults.

According to Georges Dumézil, hippomancy was widespread among Indo-Europeans in very early antiquity. Documents and testimonies refer to Romans, Persians, Celts, Germanic, and Slavic peoples. Germanic and Slavic hippomancy rituals have many points in common, in particular the sacralization of a horse that is exceptional in terms of size and coat, and that lives near a sanctuary. These rituals were opposed by Christian evangelists in the Middle Ages. Most hippomancy cults disappeared.

Today, hippomancy still plays a role in dream interpretation. The vision of omens in the attitude of a horse and the belief in its power of divination remain commonplace, particularly in the countryside of Germanic countries during the 19th century, in Central Asia, and in the Ozarks mountains in the United States today. The lucky charm attributed to the horseshoe could be linked to hippomancy.

== Etymology and definition ==
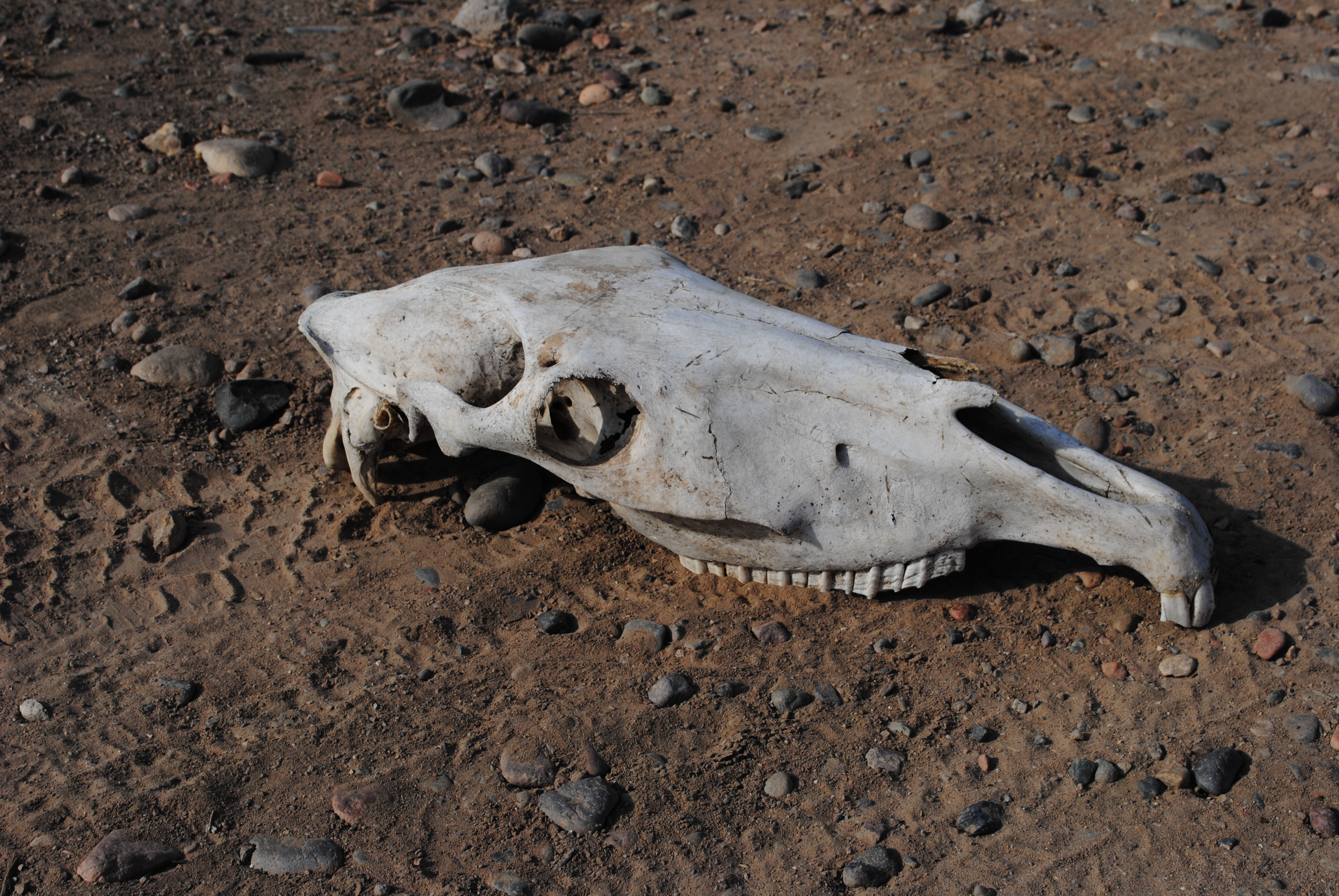
A horse skull, an instrument for hippomancy.

The term "hippomancy" comes from the Greek hippos, meaning "horse", and manteia, meaning "divination", which gave rise to mancie in Old French and Middle English. The CNRTL defines hippomancy as "divination by the neighing and movements of sacred horses". More generally, The Encyclopedia of Divination describes it as "the observation of the actions of a horse followed by their interpretation as an omen of the future". For Marc-André Wagner, hippomancy in the strict sense of the word must be ritualized and stems from a vision of the horse as a messenger animal for divinities or other higher powers. In its broader sense, it also includes the interpretation of bones (osteomancy), dreams, and even objects associated with the animal, such as horseshoes. Those who practice hippomancy are known as "hippomancers". Hippomancy can involve a variety of divination techniques, including the interpretation of footprints or parts of a horse's body, such as the skull. According to Marc-André Wagner, the appearance of the horse in a dream, as in reality, gives rise to a variety of interpretations, both positive and negative.

== History ==
Most ancient historians attribute importance to the prescience of horses, and hippomancy was widely practiced in the Indo-European area until the Middle Ages. The most common form involves a live horse, while scapulimancy is much rarer. Most of the time, hippomancy involves a human interpretation of the horse's movements. It also happens -much more rarely- in certain mythological tales and stories, that horses themselves speak to prophecy. The theme of the talking horse, which probably originated in animism, is not always linked to hippomancy. The horse's head is particularly important as an instrument of divination. These ritual practices were opposed by Christianity.

=== On Greek and Roman times ===
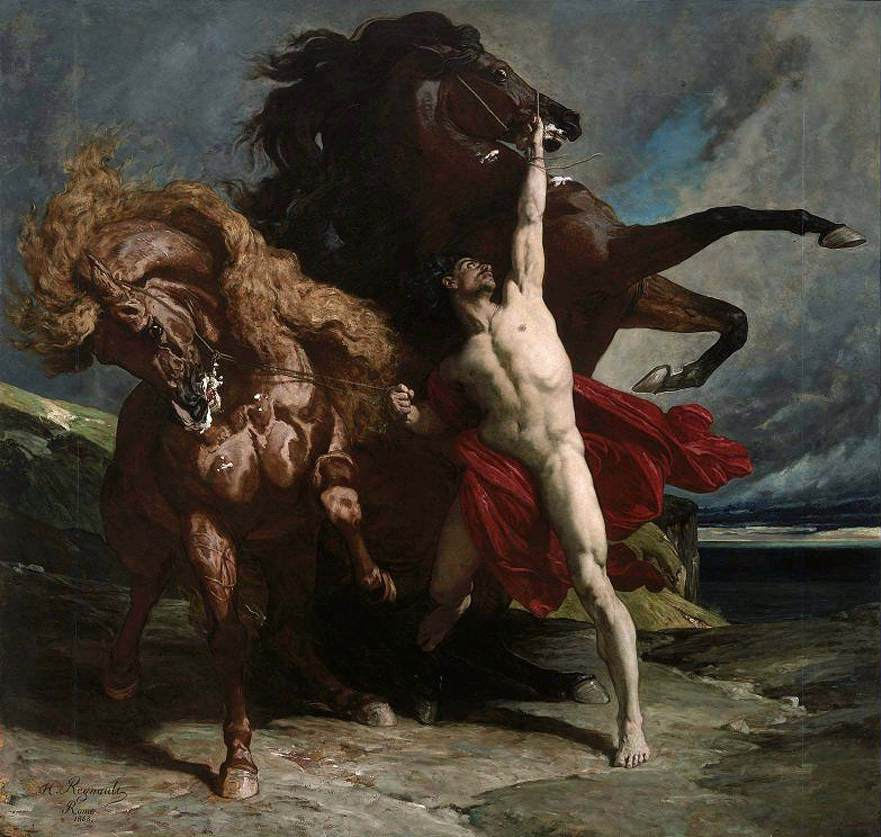
Balius and Xanthus, Achilles' two horses, are gifted with prescience. Automédon ramenant les coursiers d'Achille des bords du Scamandre by Henri Regnault, 1868, Musée d'Orsay.

While the ancient Greeks seem to have been unaware of ritual hippomancy, Latin sources attest to the importance the Romans attached to equine predictions, particularly in the context of warfare. The Romans' defeat at the hands of the Parthians was predicted by the behaviour of Crassus' horse and that of Lucius Caesennius Paetus, which were said to have bolted when crossing the Euphrates. In Virgil's Aeneid, Anchises sees four white horses grazing and interprets this as an omen of war, adding that peace is still possible because horses can harness themselves to a chariot and be docile. According to the same work, Carthage was founded on the site where the exiles of Tyre unearthed a horse skull at the suggestion of Juno, a sign of war victories and abundance for centuries to come. Cicero mentions the horse in his treatise on divination, citing the Second Punic War. Gaius Flaminius is said to have fallen senselessly with his horse in front of a statue of Jupiter Stator, sparking the suspicion of his troops, who saw this as a bad omen and asked him not to engage in combat. He took no notice of this and sought the opinion of his pullary (divination by sacred chickens), who confirmed his troops' fears. He went into battle anyway but died and his army was defeated by Hannibal. In the Iliad, Achilles' horses Balius and Xanthus are gifted with prophetic speech. When Achilles returns to battle, determined to avenge Patroclus, Xanthe lowers his head and lets his mane hang down, while Hera has just endowed him with human speech. He announces that he can do nothing to change Achilles' fate, reminding him of his imminent death at the hands of "a God and a man". However, this case of a horse speaking to prophecy is very rare.

The Greco-Latin sources about Alexander the Great, particularly Plutarch and the Novel of Alexander, present Bucephalus as a monstrous anthropophagous horse, with a Pythia predicting that only Alexander would be able to ride it. The pseudo-Callisthenes version recounts that Bucephalus, accustomed to feeding on human flesh, neighed softly when he saw Alexander, recognizing him as his master. This is a combination of hippomancy and the common theme of the untamable horse that can only be mastered by a great conqueror. Horses are also capable of predicting the death of monarchs: according to Suetonius, the horses freed by Julius Caesar behind the Rubicon stopped feeding and shed tears before their master died.

=== On persian times ===
Herodotus and Ctesias attest to hippomancy among the Persians, where it continued until the Sassanid era. Georges Dumézil sees it as a possible Indo-European rite of enthronement. It reflects the great importance of the horse in Persian thought (the future Iranians), and perhaps the role of diviner accorded to military riders. However, Persian hippomancy was also part of the first Indo-European tripartite function, kingship. According to the Histories of Herodotus in the 6th century BC, Darius exploited the Persians' belief in hippomancy to ensure his royal legitimacy: the six nobles decided to let fate decide who would be king, declaring that whoever's horse was the first to neigh at sunrise would be made king of the Persians. Darius (or his groom) used a ruse to get his stallion to neigh first. After his accession to power, he had a bas-relief engraved with an inscription saying that he owed his kingship to the merit of his horse and that of his squire Oibares. It is possible that the motif of hippomancy was added at a later date to the story of Darius' accession to power (or misunderstood by the Greeks), because it fits in with the vision he wanted to impose, that of the chosen one of the divinity Ahura Mazda. It is also possible that Darius really did use this ruse, or propagated the story to appease his people, who believed it.

Greco-Roman sources place particular emphasis on this hippomancy ritual, and on the ruse that enabled Darius the Great to rise to power.

=== On celtic times ===
Hippomancy also seems to have been practiced by the Celtic peoples of antiquity: Collin de Plancy, in his Dictionnaire Infernal, refers to Celtic hippomancy as a form of divination based on the neighing and movement of white horses, which were fed and kept in consecrated forests and considered to be the guardians of divine secrets. The Celts considered movements of the horse's head, spontaneous prancing, and starting with the right or left front leg to be significant.

There is indirect evidence that the Celts practiced hippomancy. In his two Vitae, Claude Sterckx notes the presence of horses that cause the death of impious warriors who have defied divine power after a saint's prediction, notably in the story of Neachtan. However, these horses do not prophecy directly. In the Vita of Saint Columba, a white horse is informed of the saint's impending death. This theme reveals the presence of an earlier archaic belief.

=== On germanic and scandinavian times ===
Jacob Grimm correctly suggests that hippomancy was known to the Germanic peoples. Oracle-horse rituals are mentioned by Tacitus in La Germanie (98), who describes 'pure' white horses kept in hedgerows and woods, 'fed by the state' and exempt from any other duties. According to him, the ritual consisted of harnessing them to a sacred chariot, then observing their neighing and snorting. These sacred horses are considered to be the confidants of the gods. According to Marc-André Wagner, the chariot was probably intended to carry a deity, and the ritual must have included immersion in a lake. There may also have been a link with cleromancy. This ritual seems to have lasted for centuries among the Germans: around 1080, Adam of Bremen uses the same description of the ritual as Tacitus, which suggests a contemporary practice in the 10th century and a desire to combat this survival of paganism. The Excerpta Latina Barbari also mentions these practices – although the source is unclear, as does the Inddiculus superstitionum et paganiarum (vii century), which seems to indicate that divination by horse was very common among Germanic peoples from east of the Rhine. It may well have continued among the German-speaking Franks in the 8th century. One attested practice involved placing a group of horses in a consecrated circle and interpreting whether they came out with their right or left leg first: the right leg was a good omen, the left a bad omen. Offerings and the horse sacrifice are an integral part of these rituals, although several types of animals may be sacrificed. The Saxons base their hippomancy on a horse kept in a temple, which they bring out before each major military operation: if the horse puts its right foot forward, it is a good omen.

The Landnámabók (book on the colonization of Iceland) recounts how an undin predicted to Grímr that his son would establish a town where the mare Skálm would lie down with her load. As well as being prophetic, the mare is also a guide and a guarantee of prosperity.

=== On slavic times ===
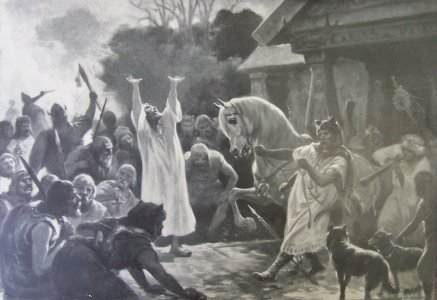
The white oracle-horse of the god Svetovit, from a painting by Józef Ryszkiewicz (1890).

Slavic hippomancy has mainly been studied by Polish scholar Leszek Słupecki. Having found numerous traces around the Baltic Sea, he formulated two hypotheses: the preservation of ancient Indo-European beliefs, or a specific development, the second hypothesis being supported by the Germanist Marc-André Wagner. Evidence comes from the Chronicle of Bishop Thietmar (1014), relating to the Lutici tribe settled south of the Baltic. The priests dug the earth, threw out lots, covered them with turf, planted two crossed spear points in the ground, and summoned a divine and sacred white horse, which they worshipped in an attitude of respectful submission. This horse, supposedly ridden by the god Svarozic, confirms or refutes the prediction by throwing lots. The Western Slavs keep their "sacred horses" in their main sanctuaries, and call on them for every important event, particularly before pillaging and to resolve questions relating to worship. The Lutici or their priests may have decided on the alliance with Henry II after resorting to hippomancy, although the practice was initially reserved for military conflicts. Acts of hippomancy were held in front of the temple at Rethra-Riedegost, consisting of making a horse walk between two crossed spears. The result depends on whether the leg is right or left, and whether or not the horse hits the spears with its hooves. It is possible that the ritual began by invoking a Chtonian god, as opposed to the solar god Svarozhits on his white horse: the digging of the earth recalls the oracular practices of Delphi, where prophetic forces are supposed to come from the ground. The ritual therefore involves telluric and solar forces, in the presence of Svarozhit's sacred white horse.

Other evidence of Slavic hippomancy dates back to the eleventh century. The two Vitae of Otto of Bamberg contain a long description of the oracle at the Triglav temple in Szczecin. A superb horse, saddled with gold and silver, was dedicated to the god. To collect a prediction, spears are stuck into the ground and the horse passes through them. If it doesn't hit any of them, the omen is favorable. The precious saddle is reserved for the god. The monk Herbord, who was present at the same ritual, explains that the horse is of extraordinary size, well-fed, black, and very wild, and that there are nine spears. The horse's black coat is linked to the Chthonic god Triglav, whose epithet Tjarnaglofi means "black head". In 1168, the Danes conquered the island of Rügen and commented on the use of the white oracular horse of the god Svetovit in the temple of Arkona, involving three groups of erected spears. If the horse crosses them with its right foot, it is a favorable omen for battle. On the other hand, if the left foot gets there first, the invasion is postponed:

"Only the priest had the right to feed this horse and ride it [...] Svetovit [...] rode this horse in the battle against the enemies of his sanctuary. Visible proof of this, according to them, was that this horse, which stayed in the stable at night, often showed traces of sweat and mud at dawn, as if it had traveled long distances after returning from exercise". – Saxo Grammaticus, Gesta Danorum, XIV, 39.

The horse is credited with the power to split into two to help the god Svantovit fight in a parallel world, while remaining in his stable, a very rare belief when it comes to the horse itself. The Chronique of Henry of Latvia also mentions a remnant of hippomancy rituals.

=== Scapulimancy and Shagai ===
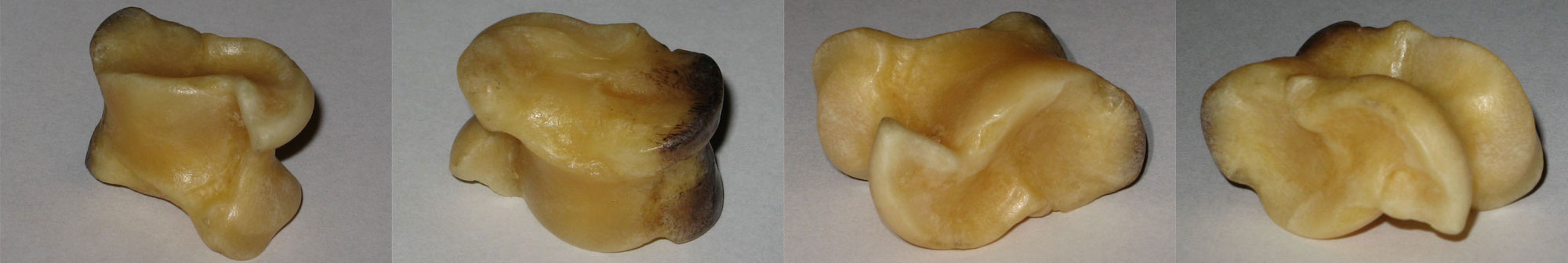
Possible positions for a Shagai bone: camel, horse, goat and sheep.

Scapulimancy can also be a form of hippomancy. This practice developed in China, where a soothsayer interpreted the shape of a bone under heat. It spread to Europe at the time of the Huns. The bone is supposed to change its appearance in response to the question. However, the horse had no special status in Scapulimancy; any large animal bone would do. Similarly, Scapulimancy is mainly practiced by a knowledgeable community (particularly in the late Middle Ages), whereas Indo-European ritual hippomancy is a popular practice.

In Mongolia, the game of knucklebones known as Shagai can be used for divination. It is played with four jacks, four sides of which have an animal value according to their shape: camel, horse, goat, and sheep. The luckiest combination is 4 horses.

=== Christianization ===
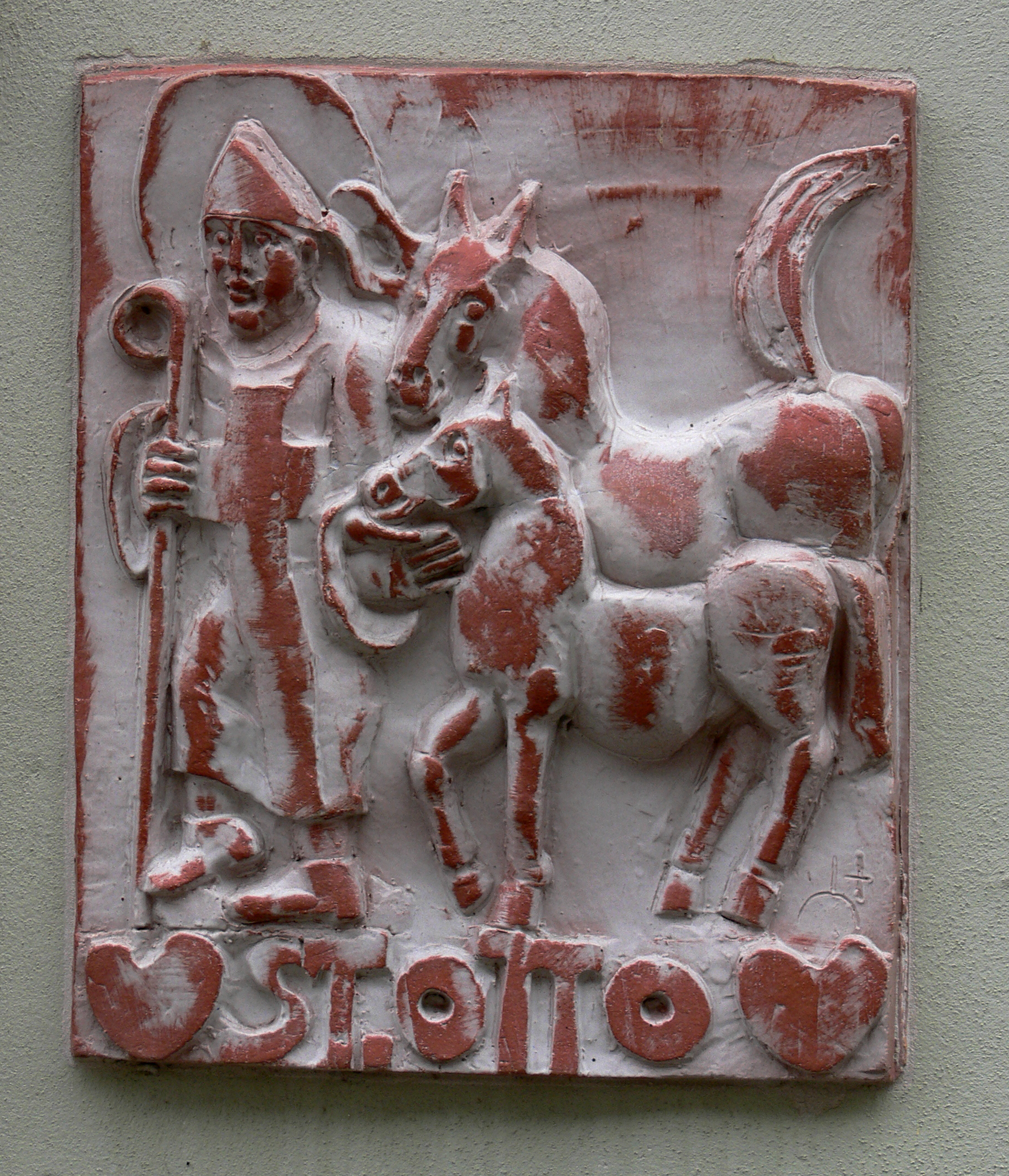
Otto of Bamberg (shown here in a bas-relief in Bamberg) fought against hippomancy rituals in Szczecin in the 11th century.

The Christianization of hippomancy involved both a struggle in the field and the recovery of rituals, as the Church wished to control or eradicate this heritage of paganism. Christian missionaries used a variety of techniques. Herbord recounts how Bishop Otto evangelized the inhabitants of Szczecin in the eleventh century: having concluded that their oracular horse should be removed, he ordered the inhabitants to sell it abroad to pull chariots, claiming that the horse would be much better able to do this than to deliver predictions. Around 1192, a Cistercian missionary named Theoderich was sent to Latvia, where the pagan population condemned him to immolation. The annulment of the sacrifice was decided by hippomancy, the horse having moved its leg forward to guarantee the missionary's life. The chronicle also reveals how the Christians exploited this belief to evangelize the Latvians: the oracle-horse having spared the evangelist, who stated that he was ridden by the Christian god and not by the pagan god.

Religious texts from the early Middle Ages increasingly included stories of oracle horses. These texts do not attribute the power of divination to the animal itself, but they do specify that God expresses himself through the horse. The Vita of saint Columba (6th century) tells how the Irish saint's horse laid its head on his lap and began to weep, guessing that he would soon die:

"To this rude and irrational animal, in the manner he chose, the Creator revealed in a manifest way that his master was about to leave him." – Adamnan von Hi, Vita S. Columbae III, 23

This Christianization of hippomancy has parallels with that of 'divining horses': the many ancient legends that attributed to horses the power to discover hidden springs or to make them gush forth with a blow of their hooves, such as the Hippocrene spring by Pegasus, shift this power from the animal to a divine will controlling the animal, or to the will of its rider. Hagiography even goes so far as to take up entire hippomancy rituals and Christianize them: the various lives of Saint Gall (a saint particularly linked to the animal world) all recount that his burial was designated by a horse (or several horses) guided by the "divine will". A motif frequently used in Christian texts is that of the horse "sent by Providence" and guided by God. Further evidence of the Christianization of hippomancy can be found in medieval fantasy fiction. In Wolfram von Eschenbach's Parzival (13th century), the hero relies on God to guide his mount. According to Christine Ferlampin-Acher, a passage from the novel Perceforest proves that hippomancy was demonized in the Middle Ages: to find out the date of Perceforest's return, Sarra launches a conjuration and declares that when the foal breaks its iron halter, the king will be on the verge of reigning. While white horses are most often chosen according to ancient sources, Perceforest's foal is black and the ritual is evil, due to the unwillingness of Sarra's spell to respond.

The oracle-horse is just one example of the Christianization of a prophetic animal, with other animals (birds, cattle, etc.) suffering a similar fate, passing from the status of animals endowed with power to that of instruments of divine will.

== Analysis ==
There are many Indo-European parallels in the stories and rituals of hippomancy.

=== Common traits between the prophetic horses of Indo-European heroes ===
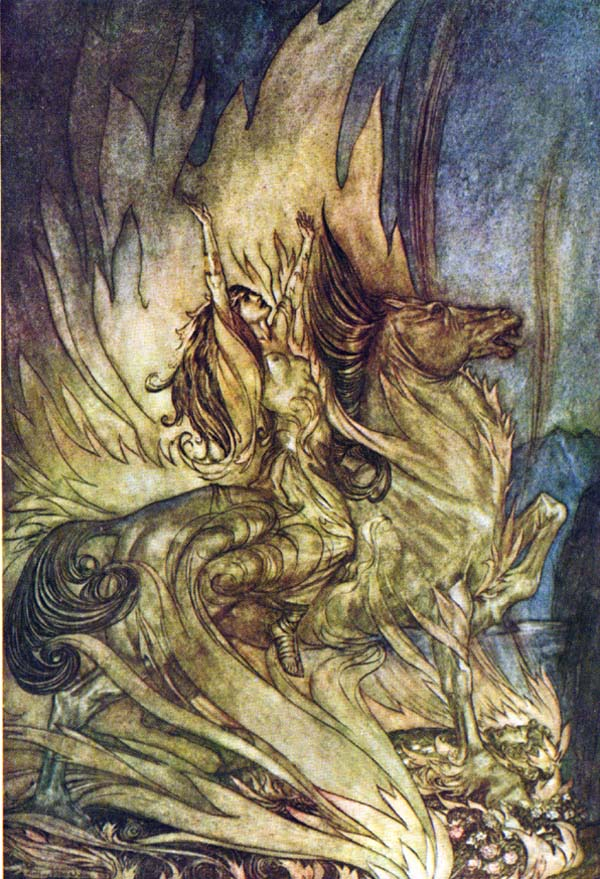
Grane and Brunehilde sacrificing themselves in a bonfire at the end of Götterdämmerung. Illustration by Arthur Rackham for the opera Der Ring des Nibelungen (The Ring of the Nibelung), based on the adventures of Siegfried.

In 1899, Henri d'Arbois de Jubainville pointed out that Xanthus (one of Achilles' horses in Greek mythology) and Liath Macha (one of Cú Chulainn's horses in Irish mythology) both possessed the gift of prophecy: they agreed to go into battle, but reluctantly, knowing what disastrous fate awaited them. Bernard Sergent notes many other similarities between these two heroic tales. In the Irish epic, Liath Macha's gift of prophecy belongs to the realm of the marvellous, since this animal is divine in nature, which suggests that the Irish story is older than the Greek. On the other hand, the speech of Achilles' horse, though divine, requires the intervention of Hera. Similarly, in Norse mythology, the horse Grani displays gifts of divination (or telepathy) when Gudrun comes to him to confide her grief over Siegfried's death, and discovers that "the stallion already knows". (Note: Marc-André Wagner compares this text with the previous two.)

In the Saga of Arrow-Odd, the soothsayer Heid tells Oddr that he will die because of the head of the horse Faxi, which is white with a mane of a different color to its body. Thinking he could ward off fate, Oddr killed the horse and built a mound for it. At the age of 300, Oddr stumbled across the water-eroded mound and struck Faxi's bleached skull with his leg. A snake emerged, bit him and he died of poisoning. An 11th-century Russian chronicle tells a similar tale, in which a sorcerer predicts to King Oleg of Kiev that he will die by his horse. Oleg ordered the animal to be locked up. Five years later, he asked about his animal and his grand squire told him that it was dead. Triumphant and sure that the sorcerers had lied, Oleg asked to see his bones and stepped on his horse's skull. A viper crawled out, bit his foot, and killed him. This story and that of Oddr certainly originate from a common Varangian source.

=== Similarities between Germanic and Slavic rituals ===
There are also many similarities between Germanic and Slavic hippomancy rituals, suggesting a common origin. In both cases, the horse is sacred, exceptional for its size, coat or the length of its mane. It lived in a sanctuary and was forbidden to ride it or perform profane tasks with it. A deity is always linked to the animal, supposedly riding it or standing in the chariot to which it is harnessed. The Slavic ritual involves nine spears, reminiscent of the weapon and sacred number of the Germanic-Scandinavian god Odin. The sacred horses of Rügen are forbidden to pluck their manes, reminiscent of the Faxi (Old Norse for "mane"), the sacred Scandinavian horses. There are, however, a few differences. Offerings and horse sacrifices are an integral part of the Germanic ritual, unlike the Slavs, who do not make offerings. The fact that Oleg does not have his horse put to death in the Russian chronicle suggests that this was probably an act considered sacrilegious by the Slavs.

== Contemporary vestiges of hippomancy ==
Although the cults of hippomancy completely disappeared with Christianity, the attribution of prophetic powers and speech to horses has been preserved in many parts of the world, notably through the belief in the horse as a messenger of death.

According to Marc-André Wagner, the horse is still seen as an oracle foretelling a forthcoming death, particularly in Germanic countries, where the omen of death is the dominant interpretation of a vision of a horse. The horse's behavior remained significant in nineteenth-century Germany: a man will die if he shakes his harness nervously, a funeral procession will pass by if it shakes its head and ruffles its mane, the occupant of a house will soon die if a horse refuses to pass in front of it, anyone who sees a horse through his window should soon die...

However, the horse is also widely associated with notions of prosperity, luck, fertility, and good news, a legacy of the divinatory practices of hippomancy. In the tale of Ferdinand the Faithful and Ferdinand the Unfaithful, the Grimm brothers tell of a man who receives a prophetic white horse with the power of speech, capable of helping and warning him.

Slavs hold similar beliefs. In a nineteenth-century wedding ritual in Russia, Poland, and Lithuania, the bride was told to throw a stick on the ground and pass a horse over it, the horse's hoof touching the ground as it passed over the stick being a bad omen. The English language has a trace of hippomancy in the expression "I heard it of the horse's mouth", which means "I have it from a reliable source". In Dutch, the verb wichelen means both "to neigh" and "to prophecy". In Russian, the horse epithet vesschii means "the seer". The Persian Avesta also describes the horse as a "seer".

=== Christmas animal prophecies ===
The horse's gift of prophecy is supposed to manifest itself particularly on certain calendar dates, during the twelve nights of the transition to winter and especially the night of Christmas. Numerous stories in popular country folklore also tell of the danger of spying on horses in an attempt to obtain their prophecy on these days. In the German countryside, farmers shy away from calling horses by name and use respectful periphrases for fear of their animals' power. If you sleep next to a horse's manger at Christmas, it is believed that you will have a prophetic dream entrusted to you by the horses. In the Tyrol, these horse prophecies are known as Viehlosen, or "animal lottery". In Quebec and Acadia, animals are also said to speak at midnight. One story tells of a farmer who overheard his horse saying to the cow, "Tomorrow we will carry our master into the earth". The farmer died during the night.

=== In the U.S.A. ===
A non-religious, superstitious form of hippomancy still exists in the Ozarks mountains of Missouri and Arkansas in the United States. During various events, it is customary to observe horses and their riders. A common belief is that the sight of a red-haired girl or woman on a white horse is auspicious. But the most auspicious omen is the sight of a horseman on a mule. If horses start running around their pasture neighing for no reason, it means that someone in the immediate vicinity is dying. When a horse's tail becomes very thick and bushy, it indicates imminent rain, particularly in dry weather.

=== In Central Asia ===
A common belief throughout Central Asia is that the horse is a psychopomp, responsible for guiding the souls of the dead into the afterlife. Although there is no mention of hippomancy rituals, the horse is perceived as a revealer of the invisible according to beliefs in contemporary Mongolia. Horse owners use their animals to predict or reveal the presence of invisible things, particularly ghosts. At funerals, the horse is supposed to be able to choose the best place for the deceased's grave: if it urinates, it's a good sign.

In Kyrgyzstan, the Er-Töshtük epic, inspired by shamanism and known from oral sources collected from the late nineteenth to the mid-twentieth century, features the marvelous horse Tchal-Kouyrouk. Able to understand human language and to speak, he warns his master and rider of dangers to come and advises him on how to avoid them.

== Interpretation of dreams about horses ==
Dreams involving the vision of a horse also give rise to prophetic interpretations. Artemidorus of Ephesus (1st century) proposed a very broad definition, depending on the dreamer's profession and social status: dreaming of riding a horse is generally a good omen. The vision of a pair of carriages or a quadriga heralds a future death, except for athletes for whom it is a sign of future triumph, and with the exception of runners for whom it heralds defeat. Wealthy women who dream of crossing a city in a chariot will have priesthoods, but for poor girls, the same vision in a dream signals prostitution. For slaves, this image heralds imminent freedom. A sick person who dreams of entering a city on horseback should be cured but will die if he sees himself leaving the city on horseback.

In Germany at the end of the 19th century, a woman's dream of a horse meant that a lover would come to her, but dreams of horses were generally interpreted negatively by Germans, particularly in East Prussia, where they were a sure sign of death. Hanns Kurth's dream dictionary interprets the horse in relation to psychic and erotic life. Riding a white horse is a sign of luck and success, while riding a black horse is a sign of fleeting success. The animal can have very broad meanings depending on the context: it signifies freedom if seen in a meadow, ease in the stable, and presages great future social success if seen saddled but without a rider. Dreaming of a turbulent horse that you manage to ride indicates future success after overcoming many difficulties. In Mongolia, dreaming of a horse brings good luck.

Cases of prophetic dreams involving a horse are cited in various works. In her Prophéties de la nouvelle sibylle, Mademoiselle A. Lelièvre speaks of a "truly prophetic dream" in which she saw herself at the top of a tall tree, surrounded by fighting men, when a black horse passed at the foot of her tree, which she mounted and galloped away through the streets of Paris, all bare. The dream ends with a vision of ancient figures who are depicted in history as having spoken oracles. John William Dunne, a British aeronautical engineer born in 1899, said he had dreamt of a mad horse racing down a road he remembered the day before such an accident occurred. However, for Richard Wiseman, the memory of an unconscious dream can be reactivated by an event that recalls it. The memory of the dream then returns to the mind of the person who interprets it as prophetic. He cites the example of someone who sees the word "gallop", forgets it, then sees the word "horse" and remembers it.

== Horseshoe ==
According to Marc-André Wagner, the meaning given to finding a horseshoe is a form of hippomancy, as horse-related objects are also considered to be harbingers of good fortune. In Germanic traditions, finding a horseshoe is always a sign of future good fortune.

== Appendix ==
=== Related articles ===
- Horse symbolism
- Horse worship
- Horse sacrifice
- Ailuromancy
- Methods of divination
- Koheilan

=== Bibliography ===
- Raymond Buckland, "Hippomancy", on The Fortune-Telling Book: The Encyclopedia of Divination and Soothsaying, Visible Ink Press, coll. "Visible Ink Series", 2003 (ISBN 978-1-57859-147-3), p. 244.
- ^{(fr)} Georges Dumézil, "L'intronisation de Darius", Orientalia J. Duchesne-Guillemin emerito oblata, Leiden – E. J. Brill, 1984 (online presentation archive)
- ^{(fr)} H. Limet, "L'observation des animaux dans les présages en Mésopotamie ancienne", on L'histoire de la connaissance du comportement animal. Colloques d'histoire des connaissances zoologiques no. 4, Liège, 1992, p. 125
- ^{(pl)} Leszec Pawel Słupecki, "Hippomancja", on Okładka książki Wyrocznie i wróżby pogańskich Skandynawów. Studium do dziejów idei przeznaczenia u ludów indoeuropejskich [Oracles and divinations in Scandinavian paganism. Research into the idea of destiny among Indo-Europeans], Varsovie, Institut d'archéologie et d'ethnologie de l'académie polonaise des sciences, 1998, p. 129–213
- Leszek Słupecki, "The temple in Rhetra-Riedegost", on Old Norse Religion in Long-term Perspectives: Origins, Changes, and Interactions : an International Conference in Lund, Sweden, June 3–7, 2004, vol. 8 de Vägar till Midgård, Nordic Academic Press, 2006 (ISBN 978-91-89116-81-8, read online archive).
- Leszek Słupecki, "Per sortes ac per equum. Lot-casting and hippomancy in the North after saga narratives and medieval chronicles", on Saga and East Scandinavia: Preprint papers of The 14th International Saga Conference, Gävle University Press, 2009 (ISBN 978-91-978329-0-8)
- ^{(fr)} Bernard Sergent, Celtes et Grecs : le livre des héros, vol. 1, Payot, coll. "Bibliothèque scientifique Payot", 1999, 798 p. (ISBN 978-2-228-89257-5)
- ^{(fr)} Marc-André Wagner, Le cheval dans les croyances germaniques : paganisme, christianisme et traditions, vol. 73 de Nouvelle bibliothèque du moyen âge, Champion, 2005, 974 p. (ISBN 978-2-7453-1216-7, read online archive).
- ^{(fr)} Marc-André Wagner, "Hippomancie", on Dictionnaire mythologique et historique du cheval, Éditions du Rocher, coll. "Cheval chevaux", 2006, 201 p. (ISBN 978-2-268-05996-9).
- ^{(fr)} Henri d'Arbois de Jubainville, La civilisation des Celtes et celle de l'épopée homérique, t. VI du Cours de littérature celtique, Paris, Fontemoing, 1899, 418 p.
