= Comedy Bang! Bang! =

Improvisational comedy podcast

- Genre: Comedy, comedy music, absurdism, improv, entertainment, talk
- Language: English

Cast and voices
- Hosted by: Scott Aukerman; Guest hosts: Chris Hardwick; Jimmy Pardo; Paul F. Tompkins; Jerry Minor as Cyber Thug

Music
- Opening theme: "Comedy Death-Ray Radio" opening theme by Reggie Watts (2009–2011) "Comedy Bang! Bang!" opening theme by Reggie Watts (2011–2026)
- Ending theme: "Closing Up the Plugbag"; Closing theme performers: Ken Marino, Steve Agee, and Casey Wilson (2012–2015)^{[a]} Ben Schwartz and Horatio Sanz (2016–2021); Ben Schwartz and various (2022–present)

Production
- Length: 60–600 minutes

Publication
- No. of episodes: 984 (as of September 16, 2026)
- Original release: May 1, 2009
- Provider: Earwolf Media
- Updates: Weekly

Related
- Adaptations: Comedy Bang! Bang! (TV series)
- Website: www.earwolf.com/show/comedy-bang-bang-podcast

Comedy Bang! Bang! is a comedy podcast which began airing as a radio show on May 1, 2009. It is hosted by writer and comedian Scott Aukerman. Under the name Comedy Death-Ray Radio, the show was originally broadcast on Indie 103, but since the summer of 2010 has belonged to the Earwolf comedy podcasting network.

Between 2012 and 2016 Comedy Bang! Bang! was also a television series on IFC hosted by Aukerman and featuring bandleaders Reggie Watts, Kid Cudi, and "Weird Al" Yankovic.

In 2021, Aukerman and producer Brett Morris launched Comedy Bang Bang World, a website and subscription platform offering the back catalog of the podcast alongside new spin-off shows.

== History ==
Comedy Death-Ray Radio first aired May 1, 2009, after Aukerman gained permission from Indie 103 to conduct a one-month tryout. The first episode's guests were Rob Huebel and Thomas Lennon.

On the May 15, 2011 podcast celebrating the show's second anniversary, Aukerman announced that the show's name was changing to Comedy Bang! Bang!. He credited his wife Kulap Vilaysack with coming up with the new name.

In episode 204 (which aired on March 4, 2013), "The Pepper Men," guests Jon Daly and Zach Galifianakis professed their love for the rock band Red Hot Chili Peppers. Both claimed to be "huge Pepper Men" and had written a song in tribute to the band titled "Abracadabralifornia", which Daly sang, imitating frontman Anthony Kiedis. On January 29, 2014, a parody website www.RHCP2014.com claimed to have the brand-new Chili Peppers song, "Abracadabralifornia". The song was written and performed by Daly and musician Cyrus Ghahremani, though many social media users believed it to be legitimate. Chili Peppers drummer Chad Smith tweeted his approval of the song.

=== Comedy Bang Bang World ===
In 2021, Aukerman tapped Brett Morris, longtime engineer, creative, and senior production manager at Earwolf to help create a new independent platform for the Comedy Bang Bang archive as well as to launch new podcasts.

On October 1, 2021 Aukerman and Morris launched Comedy Bang Bang World. The subscription service offers exclusive Discord access, ad-free back episodes of CB!B! as well as live performances, and fan favorite Earwolf podcasts like Affirmation Nation with Bob Ducca, Mike Detective, and Bonanas For Bonanza. Premium subscribers also receive new shows such as Scott Hasn't Seen, The Andy Daly Podcast Project, CBB-FM, College Town, and We Have To Stop Talkin’ TMNT On CBB.

The rotating feed of CBB Presents, where comedy friends and recurring CBB characters host their own spin-off podcasts, has included Hey Randy (Tim Baltz), WHO ME? An Extremely True Crime Podcast with The Batmin (Bobby Moynihan), This Book Changed My Life (Lily Sullivan), Full Throttle with Bob Ducca (Seth Morris), Eat Pray Dunk with Bill Walton (Dan Lippert), Hi(Nes)! I’m Prov To Meet You (Will Hines), Entreè PeeE Neur's Entrepreneur Tour (Ego Nwodim), and various one-offs and specials.

In 2023, Andy Daly took his podcasts to his own Patreon channel, while the CBB World expanded its lineup to include Threedom, The Neighborhood Listen, Womp It Up!, Going Deep, and The Gino Lombardo Show.

== Overview ==
From 2011 to 2026 each episode of Comedy Bang! Bang! began with a theme song performed by Reggie Watts, followed by Aukerman reading a listener-submitted catchphrase. This tradition began under the pretense that one will eventually replace the show's original catchphrase, "What's up, hot dog?" As of the episode "Pordlandia", released August 24, 2026, Watts's theme song is no longer played, after a Rolling Stone article made abuse allegations against him.

After introducing himself, Aukerman typically interviews a celebrity guest. After each ad break a comedian playing a character enters the show, either as an invited guest or an intruder on the recording. The conversations are largely improvised, and characters can recur over multiple episodes, forming long-running story arcs.

Near the end of each episode, Aukerman will "open up the Plug Bag", allowing the guests to promote their projects. This feature has a different listener-submitted theme song each week, as well as a different listener-submitted remix of an annually-improvised Ben Schwartz song.

While being broadcast as a radio show, the conversation was broken up by comedy songs. For the first few months of the program, comedian Doug Benson would regularly call the program and give several "8 Words or Less Movie Reviews".

The show's earlier years were characterised by a variety of improv-style games, including "Would You Rather?", "Riddle Me This", and "Freestyle Rap Battle".

Occasionally, guests will present their own features on the show. Examples include:

- "Harris' Foam/Phone Corner", in which Harris Wittels recited jokes, text-messaged to himself, which were deemed unworthy of his stand-up performances, and was ridiculed for his efforts.
- "New No-Nos", in which Paul Rust makes up new rules for life and the world, which he refers to as New No-Nos. Nearly every new rule is a ridiculous idea that does not solve any problem.
- "The Solo Bolo Olympic Song Challenge", in which Ben Schwartz and Scott sing a myriad of different songs, jingles, and show-tunes, attempting to seamlessly transition between songs that have some sort of connection to one another. These connections can include being by the same artist, including the same word or having a similar style, rhythm or melody.

Comedy Bang! Bang! has also been recorded live on stage at theatres around the world. These recordings were available for premium subscribers to Earwolf's Howl app, Stitcher Premium, and currently Comedy Bang Bang World.

== Episodes ==
=== Recurring guests ===
- Paul F. Tompkins (251 episodes)
- Jason Mantzoukas (72 episodes)
- Will Hines (63 episodes)
- Lauren Lapkus (60 episodes)
- Andy Daly (55 episodes)
- James Adomian (54 episodes)
- Lily Sullivan (52 episodes)
- Carl Tart (51 episodes)
- Neil Campbell (50 episodes)
- Jon Gabrus (48 episodes)
- Shaun Diston (43 episodes)
- Nick Kroll (43 episodes)
- Tim Baltz (41 episodes)
- Drew Tarver (41 episodes)
- Mike Hanford (39 episodes)
- Ben Schwartz (39 episodes)
- Dan Lippert (38 episodes)
- Ryan Gaul (36 episodes)
- Paul Rust (32 episodes)
- Jon Daly (31 episodes)
- Seth Morris (31 episodes)
- Horatio Sanz (30 episodes)
- Ego Nwodim (29 episodes)
- Jessica McKenna (28 episodes)
- Matt Besser (27 episodes)
- Mary Holland (27 episodes)
- Tawny Newsome (23 episodes)
- Matt Apodaca (22 episodes)
- Jessica St. Clair (22 episodes)
- Doug Benson (21 episodes)
- Reggie Watts (21 episodes)
- Brett Gelman (20 episodes)
- Ben Rodgers (20 episodes)
- Harris Wittels (20 episodes)
- Lisa Gilroy (19 episodes)
- Vic Michaelis (19 episodes)
- Zeke Nicholson (19 episodes)
- Gil Ozeri (19 episodes)
- "Weird Al" Yankovic (19 episodes)
- Paul Scheer (18 episodes)
- Joe Wengert (18 episodes)
- Matt Gourley (17 episodes)
- Thomas Middleditch (17 episodes)
- Ryan Rosenberg (17 episodes)
- Brendon Small (17 episodes)
- John Gemberling (16 episodes)
- Jimmy Pardo (16 episodes)
- Edi Patterson (16 episodes)
- Bobby Moynihan (15 episodes)
- Bob Odenkirk (15 episodes)
- Patton Oswalt (15 episodes)
- Lennon Parham (15 episodes)
- Andy Richter (15 episodes)
- David Wain (15 episodes)
- Paul Brittain (14 episodes)
- Casey Feigh (14 episodes)
- Erin Keif (14 episodes)
- Adam Scott (14 episodes)
- Jacob Wysocki (14 episodes)
- Zach Galifianakis (13 episodes)
- Jon Hamm (13 episodes)
- Rob Huebel (13 episodes)
- Gillian Jacobs (13 episodes)
- Chelsea Peretti (13 episodes)
- Madeline Walter (13 episodes)
- Kristian Bruun (12 episodes)
- Todd Glass (12 episodes)
- Thomas Lennon (12 episodes)
- Andy Samberg (12 episodes)
- Sarah Silverman (12 episodes)
- Dave Theune (12 episodes)
- Nick Thune (12 episodes)
- Taran Killam (11 episodes)
- James Mannion (11 episodes)
- Charlie McCrackin (11 episodes)
- Kumail Nanjiani (11 episodes)
- Tig Notaro (11 episodes)
- Zac Oyama (11 episodes)
- Betsy Sodaro (11 episodes)
- Erin Whitehead (11 episodes)
- Nick Wiger (11 episodes)
- Tim Heidecker (10 episodes)
- Natasha Leggero (10 episodes)
- Tatiana Maslany (10 episodes)
- Griffin Newman (11 episodes)
- Claudia O'Doherty (10 episodes)
- Zach Reino (10 episodes)
- Jeremy Rowley (10 episodes)
- Matt Walsh (10 episodes)
- Greg Hess (9 episodes)
- Brian Huskey (9 episodes)
- Tim Kalpakis (9 episodes)
- Adam Pally (9 episodes)
- Casey Wilson (9 episodes)
- D'Arcy Carden (8 episodes)
- Eugene Cordero (8 episodes)
- David Cross (8 episodes)
- Isabella Escalante (8 episodes)
- Devin Field (8 episodes)
- Hannah Pilkes (8 episodes)
- Martin Starr (8 episodes)
- Mookie Blaiklock (7 episodes)
- Sean Clements (7 episodes)
- May Darmon (7 episodes)
- Cameron Esposito (7 episodes)
- Patty Guggenheim (7 episodes)
- John Hodgman (7 episodes)
- Mitra Jouhari (7 episodes)
- Howard Kremer (7 episodes)
- Jerry Minor (7 episodes)
- Pamela Murphy (7 episodes)
- Kevin Nealon (7 episodes)
- Holly Prazoff (7 episodes)
- Max Silvestri (7 episodes)
- Kulap Vilaysack (7 episodes)
- Edgar Wright (7 episodes)
- Suzi Barrett (6 episodes)
- Anna Bezahler (6 episodes)
- Matt Braunger (6 episodes)
- Christine Bullen (6 episodes)
- Michael Cassady (6 episodes)
- Jefferson Dutton (6 episodes)
- Alex Fernie (6 episodes)
- Langston Kerman (6 episodes)
- Riki Lindhome (6 episodes)
- Allan McLeod (6 episodes)
- Mike Mitchell (6 episodes)
- John Mulaney (6 episodes)
- Jacquis Neal (6 episodes)
- Jack Quaid (6 episodes)
- Connor Ratliff (6 episodes)
- Jonah Ray (6 episodes)
- Alison Rich (6 episodes)
- Katie Rich (6 episodes)
- Rory Scovel (6 episodes)
- Rekha Shankar (6 episodes)
- Ele Woods (6 episodes)
- Ronnie Adrian (5 episodes)
- Dan Ahdoot (5 episodes)
- Caroline Anderson (5 episodes)
- Ike Barinholtz (5 episodes)
- Todd Barry (5 episodes)
- Stephanie Burchinow (5 episodes)
- River Butcher (5 episodes)
- Heather Anne Campbell (5 episodes)
- Adam Cayton-Holland (5 episodes)
- Rob Corddry (5 episodes)
- Hayes Davenport (5 episodes)
- Fran Gillespie (5 episodes)
- Colin Hanks (5 episodes)
- Erinn Hayes (5 episodes)
- Holly Laurent (5 episodes)
- Jon Mackey (5 episodes)
- Dan Mangan (5 episodes)
- Haley Joel Osment (5 episodes)
- Natalie Palamides (5 episodes)
- Eddie Pepitone (5 episodes)
- The Sklar Brothers (5 episodes)
- Mary Sohn (5 episodes)
- Brendon Walsh (5 episodes)
- Asif Ali (4 episodes)
- Stephanie Allynne (4 episodes)
- Maria Bamford (4 episodes)
- Michael Ian Black (4 episodes)
- Flula Borg (4 episodes)
- Kylie Brakeman (4 episodes)
- Jerrod Carmichael (4 episodes)
- Jocelyn DeBoer (4 episodes)
- Owen Burke (4 episodes)
- Adam DeVine (4 episodes)
- Sean Dickerson (4 episodes)
- Dave Ferguson (4 episodes)
- Nathan Fielder (4 episodes)
- Angela Giarratana (4 episodes)
- Chris Hardwick (4 episodes)
- Myq Kaplan (4 episodes)
- Moshe Kasher (4 episodes)
- Aimee Mann (4 episodes)
- Ken Marino (4 episodes)
- Eugene Mirman (4 episodes)
- Edgar Momplaisir (4 episodes)
- Mike O'Brien (4 episodes)
- Nicole Parker (4 episodes)
- Amy Phillips (4 episodes)
- Mary Lynn Rajskub (4 episodes)
- Andrea Savage (4 episodes)
- Danielle Schneider (4 episodes)
- Dhruv Uday Singh (4 episodes)
- Monika Smith (4 episodes)
- Nick Swardson (4 episodes)
- Lamar Woods (4 episodes)
- Aziz Ansari (3 episodes)
- Anthony Atamanuik (3 episodes)
- Kate Berlant (3 episodes)
- Mike Birbiglia (3 episodes)
- Kyle Bornheimer (3 episodes)
- Jordan Black (3 episodes)
- Molly Bretthauer (3 episodes)
- Nick Ciarelli (3 episodes)
- Jackie Clarke (3 episodes)
- Hannah Einbinder (3 episodes)
- Mary Elizabeth Ellis (3 episodes)
- Brad Evans (3 episodes)
- Chris Gethard (3 episodes)
- John Hartman (3 episodes)
- Anthony Jeselnik (3 episodes)
- James Austin Johnson (3 episodes)
- Alana Johnston (3 episodes)
- Kyle Kinane (3 episodes)
- Anna Konkle (3 episodes)
- Ted Leo (3 episodes)
- Amanda Lund (3 episodes)
- Manchester Orchestra (3 episodes)
- Mandell Maughan (3 episodes)
- Kate Micucci (3 episodes)
- Ify Nwadiwe (3 episodes)
- Amy Poehler (3 episodes)
- Brian Posehn (3 episodes)
- June Diane Raphael (3 episodes)
- Phoebe Robinson (3 episodes)
- Silversun Pickups (3 episodes)
- Eliza Skinner (3 episodes)
- Jenny Slate (3 episodes)
- Chris Tallman (3 episodes)
- Gregg Turkington (3 episodes)
- Brent Weinbach (3 episodes)
- Dan Wilson (3 episodes)

=== 2009 ===
Episode number	Date	Guests	Synopsis and segments	Featured songs
Episode 1: Welcome To Comedy Bang Bang	5/1/09	Rob Huebel; Thomas Lennon; Doug Benson calls in	Doug Loves Movies: X-Men Origins: Wolverine	"Turn My Swag On" (Theme Song) by Soulja Boy "Buy You Clothes, Do You In 'em, Take 'em Back" by Dragon Boy Suede "Ladyboy" by R.O. Manse "We Can Count" by Cracked Out "In My Life" by Sean Connery
Episode 2: Reggaeton Soundboard	5/8/09	Aziz Ansari; Kevin Nealon; Doug Benson calls in	Doug Loves Movies: Star Trek	"Short Pants For Fatty" by The Reigning Monarchs "Sax Man" by The Lonely Island (featuring Jack Black) "Business Time" by Flight of the Conchords "Eat It" by "Weird Al" Yankovic "Wiseguy" by Joe Pesci "Pi" by Hard 'N Phirm (featuring Dragon Boy Suede) "Nut Valet" by Dragon Boy Suede
Episode 3: Never Date A "Brown"	5/15/09	Jackie Clarke; Greg Behrendt; Nick Thune; Doug Benson calls in	Doug Loves Movies: Angels & Demons	"The Life Of Brian" by Monty Python "Austin Powers" by Don't Stop Or We'll Die "Wonderboy" by Tenacious D "Blaine" by The New Sheridans "Fanfare For The Well Dressed Man" by The Reigning Monarchs "Punch You In The Jeans" by The Lonely Island "I Wanna Be A Hulkamaniac" by Hulk Hogan & The Wrestling Boot Band
Episode 4: Special Nerdist Edition	5/22/09	Chris Hardwick (guest host); Matt Mira; Mike Phirman; Doug Benson calls in	Doug Loves Movies: Terminator Salvation	"New Math" by Tom Lehrer "You Make Me" by "Weird Al" Yankovic
Episode 5: Guest Host Jimmy Pardo	5/29/09	Jimmy Pardo (guest host); Matt Belknap; Maria Bamford as Jazz Martin; Paul Gilmartin as Congressman Richard Martin; Pat Francis as Paul Stanley; Garfunkel and Oates; Doug Benson calls in	Doug Loves Movies: Drag Me to Hell	"Broken Hearts Are for Assholes" by Frank Zappa "17" by Kings of Leon "You Make Me" by "Weird Al" Yankovic "New Cassette" by Tinted Windows "Pregnant Women are Smug" by Garfunkel and Oates "Sex With Ducks" by Garfunkel and Oates
Episode 6: Doing Laundry with Sarah	6/5/09	Howard Kremer; Brett Gelman as James Gandolfini and Billy Crystal; Sarah Silverman calls in Doug Benson calls in	Doug Loves Movies (8 Words or Less): Land of the Lost and The Hangover	"MTV Movie Awards Medley" by The Lonely Island (featuring LeAnn Rimes, Chris Isaak and Forest Whitaker) "Love Slaves" by Tim and Eric "You Won't Sass Me Like That When I Can Summon Wolves" by Dragon Boy Suede "Jug Town" by Neil Hamburger "Kick It" by The Vandals (featuring Bob Odenkirk and David Cross) "I Heal With My Steel" by Dragon Boy Suede (featuring Rapzilla) "I Got a Perm for Our Camping Trip" by Don't Stop Or We'll Die "I'm on Fire" "The Curly Shuffle" by The Jump in the Saddle Band "Buy You Clothes, Do You In 'Em, Take 'Em Back" by Dragon Boy Suede (featuring Rapzilla) "Tonight You Belong to Me" by Steve Martin and Bernadette Peters
Episode 7: Double Co-Hosts	6/12/09	The Sklar Brothers; Paul Rust as Cal Shipsby and Jerry Jimson; Paul F. Tompkins calls in Doug Benson calls in	Doug Loves Movies (8 Words or Less): Imagine That and The Taking of Pelham 123	"Big Bottom" by Spinal Tap "Who Said We’re Wack?" by The Lonely Island "I'm Never Gonna Wipe My Butt" by The Shins "The Metal" by Tenacious D "Whatever You Like" by Weird Al Yankovic "You Look Marvelous" by Billy Crystal "Zitty Van Zitties" by Adam Sandler "Hawaii" by The Glass Beef
Episode 8: The New Doctor Demento	6/19/09	"Weird Al" Yankovic; Paul Scheer as Jim Pipe and Richard Dalton; Doug Benson calls in	Doug Loves Movies (8 Words or Less): The Proposal and Year One	"The Weird Al Show Theme" by Weird Al Yankovic "Amish Paradise" by Weird Al Yankovic "It's Still Billy Joel To Me" by Weird Al Yankovic "Craigslist" by Weird Al Yankovic "Alternative Polka" by Weird Al Yankovic "My Bologna" by Weird Al Yankovic "Pancreas" by Weird Al Yankovic "One More Minute" by Weird Al Yankovic
Episode 9: R.I.P. Michael Jackson	6/26/09	Dax Shepard; Chip Pope as R.O. Mance; Paul F. Tompkins as Michael Jackson's Ghost calls in Gregg Turkington as Neil Hamburger calls in		
Episode 10: Comedy Vs. Music	7/3/09	Aimee Mann; Morgan Murphy; Seth Morris as Todd Wickey; Doug Benson calls in	Doug Loves Movies (8 Words or Less): Tom Cruise Edition	"Street Legal" by Dragon Boy Suede "Nobody's Perfect" by Sarah Silverman "Low Voice" by R. O. Manse "31 Today" by Aimee Mann "Anything" by Hard N Phirm "Three Piece Chicken Dinner" by Neil Hamburger "Birthday Checks" by Scott Aukerman "Central Park" by Don't Stop Or We'll Die "Hearts" by Tim & Eric feat. Aimee Mann
Episode 11: Birthday Checks!	7/10/09	Doug Benson; Rob Huebel; The Sklar Brothers	Doug Loves Movies (8 Words or Less): I Love You, Beth Cooper and Brüno	"Take Off" by Bob and Doug McKenzie "Jizz In My Pants" by The Lonely Island "You Be My Wife" by Borat "Driving A Truck With My High Heels On" by Weird Al Yankovic "Birthday Checks" by Scott Aukerman "Open Up Your Window" by Don't Stop Or We'll Die "Tonight I'm Gonna Rock You Tonight" by Spinal Tap "Always Look On The Bright Side Of Life" by Monty Python
Episode 12: The Baby's Sunglasses	7/17/09	Jon Hamm; Howard Kremer; Nick Kroll as himself, Bobby Bottleservice and El Chupacabra; Doug Benson	Doug Loves Movie (8 Words or Less): Harry Potter and the Half-Blood Prince	"You Won't Sass Me Like That When I Can Summon Wolves" by Dragon Boy Suede "The Most Beautiful Girl (In the Room)" by Flight of the Conchords "Let's Duet" by Dewey Cox "Champagne" by Chris Rock "Happiness Pie" by Bruce McCulloch "Boogie in Your Butt" by Eddie Murphy "Love Me Sexy" by Will Ferrell "I'm So Ronery" by Trey Parker and Matt Stone
Episode 13: Jimmy Pardo's Back	7/24/09	Jimmy Pardo (guest host); Jason Nash as The Shaman; Jimmy Dore; Paul F. Tompkins as Ice-T; Doug Benson calls in		"The Self-Proclaimed Critic" by Daver "Mexican Joe" by Jim Reeves "Bimbo" by Jim Reeves "Simple As That" by Ben Wise "Fish Out Of Water" by Simon Scardanelli "My Pants" by Dr. Pants "Mad At The World' by Daver
Episode 14: An Old Fashioned Dinner	7/31/09	Andy Samberg; Zach Galifianakis; Andy Daly as Danny Mahoney, Shooter, and himself Doug Benson calls in	Games: Would You Rather?	"Space Olympics" by The Lonely Island "Ka-Blamo!" by The Lonely Island "Come On and Get It (Up in 'Dem Guts)" by Zach Galifianakis (featuring Fiona Apple) "Stork Patrol" by The Lonely Island "I Think I Might Have Killed the President" by The Lonely Island "Boombox" by The Lonely Island (featuring Julian Casablancas) "Ardy Party" by The Lonely Island "Metaphor" by The Lonely Island
Episode 15: Four Douche Episode	8/7/09	Steve Agee; Natasha Leggero; Matt Besser as himself and Björk	Games: Would You Rather?	"So Great" by Sarah Silverman "Sugalumps" by Flight Of The Conchords "I Love Rock 'N Roll' by Joe Piscopo "Boats 'N' Hoes" by Will Ferrell and John C. Reilly "When You're Fat" by Bruce McCulloch "Let Me Borrow That Top" by Kelly "Super Heroes" by Barry Bostwick and Susan Sarandon
Episode 16: Bob Odenkirk's Death Bed	8/14/09	Andy Dick; Bob Odenkirk; Chelsea Peretti	Games: Would You Rather?	"Dip Your Cock In Vodka" by Andy Dick "We're Number One" by Bob Odenkirk "Surfin' Bird" by Pee Wee Herman "Mr. Roboto" by Styx "Sausage Party" by Pink Steel "Here She Comes" by Tim & Eric featuring Bob Odenkirk "Kick It" by The Vandals featuring Bob Odenkirk and David Cross
Episode 17: Live From Downtown Franklin	8/21/09	Thomas Lennon as Little Gary and himself Matt Walsh; Matt Braunger	Games: Would You Rather?	"Friendship" by Tenacious D "Bennigan'z" by Cracked Out "Anthem" by Chip Pope "Me, You and Steve" by Garfunkel and Oates
Episode 18: Poppin' Bottles	8/28/09	Andy Kindler; Jerry Minor; Brendon Walsh	Games: Would You Rather?	"Jazzbot Xtreme" by JP Incorporated "Think About It" by Flight Of The Conchords "Shaddap You Face" by Joe Dolce "America (Fuck Yeah)" by Matt Stone and Trey Parker "CNR" by Weird Al Yankovic "Eric The Half-a-Bee" by Monty Python "Dracula's Lament" by Jason Segel
Episode 19: SNL Reunion	9/4/09	Kevin Nealon; Laraine Newman; Casey Wilson	Games: Would You Rather?	
Episode 20: World Premiere of Tangelo	9/11/09	Mary Lynn Rajskub; Reggie Watts; Rory Scovel	Games: Would You Rather?	
Episode 21: Morning Becomes Oddly Racist	9/18/09	Chris Hardwick; Charlyne Yi; Seth Morris as Nathan Brantley		
Episode 22: Yet Another Pardo-sode	9/25/09	Jimmy Pardo (guest host); Dana Gould; Matt Belknap; Pat Francis as Paul Stanley; Mike Toomey as Kirk Rocker		"Question Song" by Tom Wilson "The Fonz Song" by the Heyettes (Pardo introduces this as "the worst song ever recorded") "The Curly Shuffle" by Jump in the Saddle "Star Trekkin'" by The Firm "Funky Man" by Dee Dee Ramone
Bonus Episode: Live from Vancouver Comedy Fest	9/25/09	Reggie Watts; Nick Thune; Todd Barry; Paul F. Tompkins; Garfunkel and Oates		
Episode 23: Guest Host Paul F. Tompkins	10/2/09	Paul F. Tompkins (guest host) "Weird Al" Yankovic; Tig Notaro		
Episode 24: No Such Thing As Shirter!	10/9/09	Nick Swardson; Matt Walsh; James Adomian as Gary Busey; Paul F. Tompkins		
Episode 25: We're Down For Whatewers	10/16/09	Gregg Turkington as Neil Hamburger; Mike O'Connell; Brent Weinbach		
Episode 26: What Do You Say To Your Dog?	10/23/09	Sarah Silverman; Andy Richter		
Episode 27: A Cyberthug Take-Over!	10/30/09	Jerry Minor as Cyber Thug (guest host); Jerry O'Connell; Nick Kroll; Sean Dickerson as Miles Archer		
Episode 28: Did Somebody Sit on a Duck?	11/6/09	Paul F. Tompkins; Todd Glass; Jon Daly		
Episode 29: Introducing Huell Howser	11/13/09	Ben Schwartz; Chip Pope; James Adomian as Huell Howser		
Episode 30: Yerr An Egghead!	11/20/09	Matt Walsh; Howard Kremer as himself, Sloppy Timmy Slotsman, Big Jim Slotsman, and Bobby Jensen; Dave Holmes		"Pi" by Hard 'n Phirm "Gymnastics Dad" by JP Hasson "Me Mother Became a Werewolf" by The Mighty Regis "I'm Not Paying Five-Hundred Dollars to Watch Douchebags Eat Turkey" by Dragon Boy Suede "I Must Be in Love" by The Rutles
Episode 31: Happy Black Friday!	11/27/09	Michael Cera; Harris Wittels; James Adomian as Huell Howser; Paul F. Tompkins as Ice-T calls in Jimmy Pardo; Nick Kroll as Bobby Bottleservice calls in	Games: Harris' Phone Corner, Would You Rather?	"The Thanksgiving Song" by Adam Sandler "Cold Turkey" by John Lennon (briefly) "I'm Not Paying 500 Dollars to Watch Douchebags Eat Turkey" by Dragon Boy Suede; Do They Know It's Christmas? by The Comedy Death-Ray Xmas Nativity Choir "Christmas is for Fucking" by Reggie Watts "You've Got to Follow Your Balloon" by Mr. Show "Gay Ray, the Reggae Gay (The Homosexual Rasta)" by Eli Braden "Skipper Dan" by Weird Al Yankovic
Episode 32: Raaaaaaaandy!	12/4/09	Aziz Ansari; Brendon Small as himself, Captain Moustache, Fat Albert, and Louis Armstrong; Hal Rudnick as Stan Lee		"Bloodlines" by Dethklok "I'm On a Boat" by The Lonely Island "Give the Jew Girl Toys" by Sarah Silverman
Episode 33: Welcome To Jamrock	12/11/09	Kyle Kinane; Paul F. Tompkins		
Episode 34: Have A Merry Christmas...	12/18/09	Jon Hamm; Doug Benson; Nick Kroll as El Chupacabra; Paul F. Tompkins as John C. Reilly; James Adomian as Jesse Ventura; Kulap Vilaysack		
The Best of 2009	12/27/09	Nick Kroll as Bobby Bottleservice; Paul F. Tompkins as Ice-T; James Adomian as Huell Howser		

=== 2010 ===
Episode number	Date	Guests	Synopsis and segments	Featured songs
Episode 35: And A Happy New Year!	1/8/10	Thomas Lennon as Little Gary and Chris Mindy; Patton Oswalt; Brett Gelman		"eBay" by "Weird Al" Yankovic "Cool Guys Don't Look at Explosions" by Andy Samberg, Will Ferrell and J. J. Abrams "Stu's Song" by Ed Helms "Police & Thieves" by The Clash
Episode 36: Another Cyberthug Take-Over!	1/15/10	Jerry Minor as Cyber Thug (guest host); Matt Besser as Kanye East and Taylor Slow; Sean Dickerson as Miles Archer		
Bonus Episode: Live from San Francisco Sketch Fest	1/18/10	Doug Benson; Michael Ian Black; Paul F. Tompkins; Dana Gould; Reggie Watts		
Episode 37: Exclusive Prince Interview	1/22/10	Sarah Silverman; Todd Glass; Hannibal Buress		
Episode 38: Paul F. Tompkins Steps In	1/29/10	Paul F. Tompkins (guest host); Kaitlin Olson; Matt Gourley; Jeremy Carter; Mark McConville		
Bonus Episode: Live from UCB Theatre New York	2/2/10	Zach Galifianakis; David Cross; Todd Barry; John Gemberling; Ted Leo		
Episode 39: The Premiere of Bob Ducca	2/5/10	Garfunkel and Oates; Seth Morris as Bob Ducca; Brendon Walsh		
Episode 40: Happy Valentine's Day	2/12/10	Doug Benson; James Adomian as Christopher Hitchens; Harris Wittels; Paul F. Tompkins as Garry Marshall	Games: Harris' Phone Corner, Would You Rather?	
Episode 41: Winter Olympic Fever	2/19/10	Aimee Mann; Kumail Nanjiani; Drew Droege as Maya Angelou		
Episode 42: Winter Olympic Fever: Deux!	2/26/10	Nick Thune; Matt Walsh as Stash Polinyac; Ian Roberts as Boris Darchinian; Danielle Schneider as Irena Stinchen; James Pumphrey		
Episode 43: Good One!	3/5/10	Tig Notaro; Casey Wilson as Julie Penzmere; Rory Scovel		
Episode 44: We Got A Caller on the Line	3/12/10	Nick Kroll as El Chupacabra; Paul F. Tompkins as Dame Sir Andrew Lloyd Webber; Jason Woliner	Games: Would You Rather?	"Lasagne" by "Weird Al" Yankovic "Bitch School" by Spinal Tap "I'm Saving My Hymen for Jesus"* by Broad Comedy
Episode 45: Cyberthug Take-Over Pt. Three	3/19/10	Jerry Minor as Cyber Thug (guest host); James Adomian as Jesse Ventura; Craig Robinson; David Sitek; Dave Cousin; Brandon Johnson		
Episode 46: Curb Your Suicide Attempts	3/26/10	Ben Stiller; Jeff Garlin; Paul F. Tompkins as Ice-T; Andy Daly as Ben Alterman		
Episode 47: Happy Chap	4/2/10	Greg Proops; Jon Daly as Barry R.	Games: Would You Rather?	"Uncle Fucka" by Trey Parker and Matt Stone "Hamburgers and Hot Dogs" by Tim and Eric "One Night"* by Stephen Bowcom "Poisoning Pigeons in the Park" by Tom Lehrer
Episode 48: In The Thicke of the Night	4/9/10	The Sklar Brothers; Paul Scheer as J. Montgomery Scott		"That's What I Wish" by Sarah Silverman "Will We Eat Each Other's Doodies" by Sarah Silverman "Hey Aunt Jemima"* by Jeff Ellingson "Glad You Hurt Your Hand" by Steve Agee and Brian Posehn "Halo" by Weirder Scott Aukerman (Parody of "Hello" by Lionel Richie) "Glad I Hurt My Hand" by Brian Posehn
Episode 49: Family Counseling	4/16/10	Adam Scott; Matt Walsh as Jerry McDowell; June Diane Raphael as Kathy McDowell; James Pumphrey as Damian Vast; Chris Fairbanks		"Baby" by Tenacious D "Penis Song (Not the Noel Coward Song)" by Monty Python "My Retarded Girlfriend"* by Phillipe Simondet "Get Me to the Toilet"* by Bloody Anal Leakage "Midnight Party"* by Shoddy Radio
Episode 50: A Thrilling Hour or So	4/23/10	Paul Gilmartin; Mookie Blaiklock; The cast of The Thrilling Adventure Hour		"Asian Baby" by Mike O'Connell "Colonel Tick Tock's Theme" by the cast of the Thrilling Adventure Hour "Here's to Us" by Paul F. Tompkins and Paget Brewster "Fish Heads" by Dr. Demento "Gangsta Dinosaurs"* by Humungo Ginormous "Man-Made Vagina"* by Beaver and Phone "Takin' a Shit"* by John Gardner "When I'm Done" by Dragon Boy Suede
Episode 51: One Year Anniversary Party	4/30/10	Tig Notaro; Paul F. Tompkins as John C. Reilly, Ice-T and Dame Sir Andrew Lloyd Webber calls in James Adomian as Jesse Ventura and Huell Howser; Seth Morris as Bob Ducca; Thomas Lennon as Little Gary; Rich Fulcher; Nick Kroll as Bobby Bottleservice and El Chupacabra; Jerry Minor	Games: Would You Rather?	"Love Will Lead You Back" by Taylor Dayne "Tell It To My Heart" by Taylor Dayne "I'll Be Your Shelter" by Taylor Dayne "Heart of Stone" by Taylor Dayne "Original Sin" by Taylor Dayne "Champion" by Kristen Wiig "Birthday Checks" by Weirder Scott "Pico and Sepulveda" by Felix Figuero and His Orchestra
Episode 52: Introducing: The Japan Dogs	5/7/10	Sarah Silverman; Harris Wittels; Ben Schwartz	Games: Harris' Phone Corner	
Episode 53: A Cover of a Parody	5/14/10	"Weird Al" Yankovic; Garfunkel and Oates		
Episode 54: The Wacky Ding Dongs	5/21/10	Marc Maron; The Birthday Boys		
Episode 55: Go Rent Delgo!	5/28/10	Natasha Leggero; Jason Mantzoukas; Seth Morris as Bob Ducca	Games: Jukebox Jury	
Episode 56: Is Dave Foley Here?	6/4/10	David Anthony Higgins; Paul F. Tompkins as Cake Boss		
Episode 57: A Buttery, Juicy Episode	6/11/10	Brian Posehn; James Adomian as Merrill Shindler		
Episode 58: I Want It That Way	6/19/10	Rob Huebel; Steel Panther		
Episode 59: Free Subarus for Moms!	6/25/10	Paul F. Tompkins; Todd Glass; Andy Daly as August Lindt	Games: Would You Rather?	
Episode 60: Now Hiring Interns!	7/2/10	Donald Glover; Jessica St. Clair as Marissa Wompler; Brendon Walsh		
Episode 61: Palin 2012	7/9/10	Jimmy Pardo; Rory Scovel		
Episode 62: Serious or Sarcastic?	7/16/10	Andy Richter; Matt Besser as Bennett Stevens; Paul F. Tompkins as Danny Glover; Don't Stop Or We'll Die (Paul Rust, Michael Cassady, Harris Wittels)	Games: Would You Rather?	
Episode 63: Harry's World: Mad Men	7/23/10	Jon Hamm; Rich Sommer; David Koechner as Gerald "T-Bones" Tibbons		
Episode 64: Harrison Ford Approved	7/30/10	Sarah Silverman; Mary Lynn Rajskub; James Adomian as Merrill Shindler		
Episode 65: Welcome To Earwolf!	8/5/10	The Sklar Brothers; Seth Morris as Bob Ducca	Games: Jukebox Jury	"A Kiss is Not a Contract" by Flight of the Conchords "Darling" by John C. Reilly "Japanese Cowboy" by Ween "Bob" by "Weird Al" Yankovic "Give Peace a Chance" by Mitch Miller and the Gang
Episode 66.1: Where Do Babies Come From?	8/12/10	Bob Odenkirk; Brett Gelman		
Episode 66.2: Cool Whip Play Challenge	8/16/10	Bob Odenkirk; Brett Gelman		
Episode 67: What Happens In Vegas	8/19/10	Rob Corddry; Lake Bell; Paul F. Tompkins as Cake Boss	Games: Would You Rather?	
Episode 68: Live From LA it's Comedy Bang Bang!	8/26/10	Fred Armisen; Howard Kremer; Trainwreck	Games: Would You Rather?	
Episode 69: I Am Not Food	9/1/10	Thomas Lennon as Little Gary; Kumail Nanjiani; Loch and Key	Games: Entourage re-cap; What Am I Thinking?	
Episode 70: Rock 'n Roll Dreams	9/8/10	Ted Leo; Aimee Mann; Jon Wurster; Paul F. Tompkins as Mr. Brainwash	Games: Jukebox Jury; Fortunately, Unfortunately	
Episode 71: Comedy Death Scott	9/15/10	Paul Scheer as himself and J. Montgomery Scott; Nick Kroll as himself, El Chupacabra, and Vinnie from Port Washington		
Episode 72: History In The Making	9/22/10	Janeane Garofalo; Andy Dick; James Adomian as Paul Giamatti, Huell Howser, and Mr. Hairslice		
Episode 73: Featuring Betty White!	9/29/10	Nick Swardson as himself and Betty White; Jon Daly as Bill Cosby-Bukowski	Games: UnGames Question of the Week; Jukebox Jury; Would You Rather	
Episode 74: Introducing Rocky!	10/6/10	Andy Daly as Bill Carter and Patrick McMahon; Jason Mantzoukas		"Running With Chicken" by Garfunkel and Oates
Episode 75: The Farting Fuck Faces	10/13/10	Mike Birbiglia; Matt Besser as Mark Zuckerberg; Henry Phillips	Games: Fortunately Unfortunately	
Episode 76.1: Can He Sing, Jeremy Piven?	10/15/10	Zach Galifianakis; Paul F. Tompkins as Dame Sir Andrew Lloyd Webber; Dillon Campbell	Part 1	
Episode 76.2: Don't Cry Rolling Skate Train	10/20/10	Zach Galifianakis; Paul F. Tompkins as Dame Sir Andrew Lloyd Webber; Dillon Campbell	Part 2 Games: What Am I Thinking?; Jukebox Jury; Would You Rather?	
Episode 77: Crappy Howl-o-ween!	10/27/10	Jerry Minor as Cyber Thug; Sean Dickerson as Miles Archer; Allan McLeod as Ghost Boy; Jon Daly as Beuford le Barron; Brett Gelman as Messmore le Barron; Nick Wiger as Leo Carpazzi	Halloween episode Games: Would You Rather?	
Episode 78: Poundin' Puss in Heaven	11/3/10	Doug Benson; John Gemberling as Pastor Rhe Holner	Games: The Leonard Maltin Games; What Am I Thinking?	
Episode 79: Who'd Fuck Tom Brady?	11/10/10	Eugene Mirman; Jackie Clarke as Claire Woodruff; Mookie Blaiklock as Carl McCarthy	Games: What Am I Thinking?	
Episode 80: Enigma Force Five Reunion	11/17/10	Adam Scott; Paul F. Tompkins as Ice-T; James Adomian as Jesse Ventura and Huell Howser		
Episode 81: Todd Barry Vs. Borders	11/24/10	Todd Barry; Paul Rust as Leo Carnell; Neil Campbell as Nathan Morrow	Games: What Am I Thinking?	
Episode 82: Dammit That Was a Hot Jam	11/29/10	Kevin Nealon; Sarah Silverman; Tig Notaro; Jon Daly as Barry R. Jerry Minor as Cyberthug; Sean Dickerson as Miles Archer	Games: Would You Rather?	
Episode 83: Family Matters	12/6/10	Michael Ian Black; Seth Morris as Bob Ducca	Games: Would You Rather?	
Episode 84: Impotent Teamsters Unite	12/13/10	Harris Wittels; Reggie Watts; Eddie Pepitone as Tommy Malone	Games: Harris' Foam Corner; What Am I Thinking?	
Episode 85: That's One Way of Doing It	12/20/10	Colin Hanks; Paul F. Tompkins as Cake Boss; Nick Kroll as El Chupacabra; Seth Morris as Bob Ducca; Andy Daly as Don Dimello; Brett Gelman as himself and James Gandolfini; Neil Campbell as Pimsy the Elf, Jerry, and Ebesneezer Scrooge	Christmas episode	
The Best of 2010	12/26/10	Paul F. Tompkins as himself, Ice-T, Danny Glover, Garry Marshall, and Andrew Lloyd Webber; Andy Daly as August Lindt; Brett Gelman; James Adomian as Huell Howser and Christopher Hitchens; Jon Daly as Bill Cosby-Bukowski and Frasier Fonzie; Nick Kroll as himself and El Chupacabra; Reggie Watts; Seth Morris as Bob Ducca; Thomas Lennon as himself and Little Gary; Tig Notaro as herself, Good One Robot, and Molly's Mother		

=== 2011 ===
Episode number	Date	Guests	Synopsis and segments	Featured songs
Episode 86: The New Year Attack of 2011	1/3/11	Patton Oswalt; Rob Huebel	Games: Alive or Dead; Would You Rather?	
Episode 87: Droppin' Wallets!	1/10/11	Nick Thune; Chelsea Peretti	Games: Sports Results; Jukebox Jury; What Am I Thinking?	
Episode 88: Impression Off	1/17/11	Chris Hardwick; Matt Braunger	Games: Guess the Misheard Lyrics; The WTF? Question of the Week; Would You Rather?	
Episode 89: Great Big Hill of Hope	1/24/11	Nick Kroll as Fabrice Fabrice and Bobby Bottleservice; Harris Wittels	Games: Harris' Foam Corner; Jukebox Jury	
Episode 90: Is This Sexual Harassment?	1/31/11	Brett Gelman; Michael Gladis; Maria Thayer	Games: Is This News Story True or False?; What Am I Thinking?; Would You Rather?	
Episode 91: Garry Marshall Presents	2/7/11	"Weird Al" Yankovic; Tom Scharpling; Paul F. Tompkins as Garry Marshall	Games: Who Said It?; Would You Rather?	
Episode 92: How's Your Boner?	2/14/11	Andy Richter; Jessica St. Clair as Marissa Wompler	Games: Guess the Celebrities’ Real Name; What Am I Thinking?; Would You Rather?	
Episode 93: And The Oscar Goes To...	2/21/11	Reggie Watts; James Adomian as Paul Giamatti	Games: Oscar Trivia; Would You Rather?	
Episode 94: Dip Didda Dip Dow!	2/28/11	Ben Schwartz; Andy Daly as Hot Dog	Games: Jukebox Jury	
Episode 95: Phishing For Compliments	3/7/11	Natasha Leggero; Harris Wittels; Matt Besser as King George VI	Games: Harris' Foam Corner; Jukebox Jury; Would You Rather?	
Episode 96: Live from SXSW!	3/13/11	Paul Reubens; Dave Foley; Thomas Lennon as Little Gary	Games: Would You Rather?	
Episode 97: Can I Catch A Ride?	3/21/11	Jon Hamm; Seth Morris as Bob Ducca	Games: Who Said It?; What Am I Thinking?	
Episode 98: A Worthy Uhhh	3/28/11	Adam Scott; James Adomian as Alan Rickman	Games: Guess The Misheard Lyric; Jukebox Jury	
Episode 99: Somethin' For Daddy!	4/4/11	Patton Oswalt; Andy Daly as Don Dimello	Games: Would You Rather?	
Episode 100: The Big One-Oh-Oh	4/11/11	Susanna Hoffs; Matthew Sweet; Rob Huebel; Thomas Lennon as himself and Little Gary; Doug Benson calls in	Games: Who Said It?	
Episode 101: Booked It!	4/18/11	Joe Lo Truglio; Casey Wilson; Matt Besser as Fred Phelps	Games: Would You Rather?	
Episode 102: Behind the Music	4/25/11	Tim Heidecker as himself and Elton John; Gregg Turkington as Neil Hamburger and Bernie Taupin	Games: Alive or Dead?	"Life On The Road" by Heidecker & Wood
Episode 103: These Times They Are A-Changin'	5/2/11	Paul F. Tompkins as himself, Huell Howser, and Yogi Bear; Reggie Watts; Andy Daly as Clive Dundee; Paul Scheer as Truck Bastien; Tig Notaro; Nick Kroll as El Chupacabra; James Adomian as Huell Howser, Jesse Ventura, and Paul F. Tompkins		
Episode 104: Shut Up Dracula!	5/9/11	Paul Feig; The Birthday Boys	Games: Would You Rather?	
Episode 105: Comedy is Honey	5/16/11	Matt Walsh; Scot Armstrong; Jon Daly as Sappity Tappity	Games: Alive or Dead?; What Am I Thinking?	
Episode 106: It's a Fucking Podcast: Pt. 1	5/23/11	Andy Richter; Paul F. Tompkins as Cake Boss	Games: Who Said It?	"I'm back" by Randy Savage "Rocket Experience" by Buzz Aldrin
Episode 106.5: It's a Fucking Podcast: Pt. 2	5/30/11	Andy Richter; Paul F. Tompkins as Cake Boss	Games: Would You Rather?	"The Crimson Permanent Assurance" by Monty Python "A Kiss is not a Contract" by Flight of the Conchords
Episode 107: Maybe It's Maybelline	6/6/11	John Mulaney as himself and George St Geegland; Nick Kroll as Gil Faizon, Fabrice Fabrice, and Don Pardo as Marv Albert		
Episode 108: Pussy CPR	6/13/11	Rob Corddry; Erinn Hayes; James Adomian as Dov Charney	Games: What Am I Thinking?; Jukebox Jury	
Episode 109: The Andy Samberg Special	6/20/11	Andy Samberg; Adam Pally as Bro	Games: Hollywood Facts; Would You Rather?	"Reba (Two Worlds Collide)" by The Lonely Island feat. Kenan Thompson "Japan" by The Lonely Island
Episode 110: Thumbs Yes!	6/27/11	Colin Hanks; Myq Kaplan; Paul Scheer as Kylie Bloom	Games: What Am I Thinking?; Would You Rather?	"Having No Friends" by Sarah Silverman
Episode 111: Hi, How Are You?	7/1/11	David Guy Levy; Harris Wittels; Brett Gelman	Games: Harris' Foam Corner	"I Can Make You A Man (Reprise)" by Tim Curry "The Camping Song" by Hard 'n Phirm
Episode 112: Since You've Been Gone	7/5/11	"Weird Al" Yankovic; Paul F. Tompkins as Andrew Lloyd Webber	Games: Word Association; Would You Rather?	"If That Isn't Love" by "Weird Al" Yankovic "Since You've Been Gone" by "Weird Al" Yankovic
Episode 113: Skanking Hayride	7/11/11	Bobby Moynihan; Seth Morris as Ozzie Patinkin	Games: Hollywood Facts; Would You Rather?	"The Government Totally Sucks" by Tenacious D "My Sister's Cute" by Tim and Eric "Dry Sheets, Ice Cream, Jellybeans" by Sarah Silverman & Sydney Park
Episode 114: Hats Off to Caruso	7/18/11	Edgar Wright; Joe Cornish; Matt Besser as Martin Riley	Games: Hollywood Facts; Would You Rather?	"With A Girl Like You" by The Rutles "You're Gonna Die Soon" by Sarah Silverman
Episode 115: The Plug-In Drug	7/25/11	Paul Rudd; David Wain; Ken Marino	Games: Freestyle Rap Battle; What Am I Thinking?; Would You Rather?	"No Homo" by The Lonely Island
Episode 116: When I Go To Queens...	8/1/11	Todd Glass; Jessica St. Clair as Marissa Wompler	Games: What Am I Thinking?; Would You Rather?	"Lee" by Tenacious D "Hamburgers and Hot Dogs" by Tim and Eric
Episode 117: Can't Never Did Nothing	8/8/11	David Cross; Ruben Fleischer; Chad Carter as Sam Darling	Games: Hollywood Facts; Would You Rather?	"Pizza Boy" by David Cross "You've Got To Follow Your Balloon" by Bob Odenkirk & David Cross
Episode 118: Hologram Toes	8/15/11	Patton Oswalt; Eddie Pepitone as The Diner Marshal		"I'm Glad You Hurt Your Hand" by Steve Agee & Brian Posehn "I Sit On You" by Tim and Eric
Episode 119: Andi Callahan, RN	8/22/11	Gillian Jacobs; Andy Daly as Andi Callahan		"The Mulatto Song" by Dewey Cox
Episode 120: Farts and Procreation	8/29/11	Adam Scott; Harris Wittels; Chelsea Peretti	Games: Harris' Foam Corner	"Mama" by The Lonely Island
Episode 121: Bro-ing Out	9/5/11	Jimmy Pardo; Paul Rust; Rob Delaney	Games: What Am I Thinking?; Hot Topics; Jukebox Jury	
Episode 122: Shanghaied by Irene	9/12/11	Zach Galifianakis; Paul F. Tompkins as Werner Herzog; Yo La Tengo	Games: Would You Rather?	"Let's Save Tony Orlando's House" by Yo La Tengo "Sugarcube" by Yo La Tengo "Periodically Double or Triple" by Yo La Tengo "Tom Courtenay" by Yo La Tengo
Episode 123: No Scoop For You	9/19/11	Amy Poehler; The Bangles; Adam Pally as David Fiene	Games: Freestyle Rap Battle; Would You Rather?	"Manic Monday" by The Bangles "Hazy Shade of Winter" by The Bangles "Ride The Ride" by The Bangles
Episode 124: Bro-ing Out Pt. Deux	9/26/11	Todd Barry; Nick Thune; Matthew Sweet	Games: Hot Topics; What Am I Thinking?; Would You Rather?	"She Walks The Night" by Matthew Sweet "Baltimore" by Matthew Sweet "I've Been Waiting" by Matthew Sweet "Byrdgirl" by Matthew Sweet
Episode 125: Wine in the Whirlpool	10/3/11	Sarah Silverman; Nick Kroll as himself, Bobby Bottleservice, and Erma; Dan Mangan	Games: Would You Rather?	"Oh Fortune" by Dan Mangan "Leaves, Trees, Forest" by Dan Mangan "Post-War Blues" by Dan Mangan "Sold" by Dan Mangan
Episode 126: Suicide is Painless	10/10/11	Jon Hamm; Paul F. Tompkins as Garry Marshall; Nick Lowe	Games: Freestyle Rap Battle; Would You Rather?	"Stoplight Roses" by Nick Lowe "Sensitive Man" by Nick Lowe "All Men Are Liars" by Nick Lowe "(What's So Funny 'Bout) Peace, Love, and Understanding" by Nick Lowe
Episode 127: National Pleasure	10/17/11	Paul Scheer as Bob Cage; Nick Swardson; Brody Stevens	Games: Guess The Misheard Lyrics; Would You Rather?	"Todd Barry Is An Idiot" by Aimee Mann, Tim Heidecker & Michael Penn "My Little Buttercup" by Steve Martin, Martin Short & Chevy Chase "Like A G6" by Richard Cheese
Episode 128: Coach? Coach? Coach?	10/24/11	Jon Heder; Harris Wittels; Seth Morris as Hank Williams Jr.	Games: Harris' Foam Corner; What Am I Thinking?; Alive or Dead?; Freestyle Rap Battle	"Humanitarian Song" by Sarah Silverman "Der Guten Tag Hop-Clop" by Will Ferrell
Episode 129: Comedy Fang Fang	10/31/11	Brett Gelman as Messmore le Barron; Jon Daly as Beuford le Barron; Allan McLeod as Ghost Boy; Neil Campbell	Games: Freestyle Rap Battle	"Halloween (E.T. Please Phone Home)" by "Weirder Scott" Aukerman featuring Aimee Mann "Batman, Wolfman, Frankenstein, or Dracula" by The Diamonds
Episode 130: Tall Napoleon	11/7/11	Bobby Moynihan as Charles Barkley and Fagin Platt; Jenny Slate; Elizabeth Laime	Games: What Am I Thinking?; Who Said It?; Would You Rather?	"My Dead Dog Rover" by Hank, Stu, Dave & Hank "Jesus Ranch" by Tenacious D
Episode 131: Mayor of Hollywood	11/14/11	Andy Daly as Chip Gardner; Jason Mantzoukas		"Spaceballs" by The Spinners "Heartbreak Hotel" by Stan Freberg
Episode 132: Occupy Thanksgiving	11/21/11	David Wain; Margaret Cho; James Adomian as Dov Charney; Grant-Lee Phillips	Games: What Am I Thinking?; Would You Rather?	"Your Favorite Thing" by Margaret Cho & Grant-Lee Phillips "Asian Adjacent" by Margaret Cho & Grant-Lee Phillips "Eat Shit and Die" by Margaret Cho & Grant-Lee Phillips "Wave of Mutilation" by Grant-Lee Phillips, David Wain, Margaret Cho & Scott Aukerman
Episode 133: Fortunately Unfortunately	11/28/11	Patton Oswalt; Chris Tallman as Leslie Schecter	Games: Fortunately Unfortunately; Would You Rather?	"I'm Not Going To Pay $500 To Watch Douchebags Eat Turkey" by Dragon Boy Suede "Cain Mutiny" by Tim Heidecker "That's Been Done" by Sarah Silverman
Episode 134: Bride of Chucky	12/5/11	Kevin Nealon; Ben Schwartz; Amy Phillips as Jennifer Tilly	Games: Subjective Holiday Quiz; Would You Rather?	"Do They Know It's Christmas?" by Comedy Bang Bang "Christmas Is For Fucking" by Reggie Watts
Episode 135: Scavenge and the Wisemen	12/12/11	Paul F. Tompkins as himself and Cake Boss; Erinn Hayes; Dan Telfer	Games: Would You Rather?	"Christopher Bell Rock" by The Birthday Boys "Christmas Wrapping" by Doug Benson
Episode 136: 2011 Holiday Spectacular	12/19/11	Harris Wittels; Paul F. Tompkins as Andrew Lloyd Webber; Brett Gelman as Billy Crystal; Thomas Lennon as Little Gary; Jon Daly as Kelsey Grammer and Bill Cosby-Bukowski; Adam Pally; Nick Kroll as El Chupacabra; Seth Morris as Bob Ducca; James Adomian as Jesse Ventura and Huell Howser	Games: Harris' Foam Corner; Freestyle Rap Battle; NOTE: No Plugs segment.	"If It Doesn't Snow On Christmas" by Joe Pesci "I'm A Christmas Tree" by Wild Man Fischer & Dr. Demento "Santa's Packin'" by R.O. Manse (feat. Dukey) "What Can You Get a Wookiee for Christmas (When He Already Owns a Comb?)" by The Intergalactic Droid Choir and Chorale "Another Christmas Song" by Stephen Colbert
Episode 137: Best of 2011 Pt. 1	12/26/11	Paul F. Tompkins	10. Bro (Episode 109: The Andy Samberg Special); 9. Boner Jamz (Episode 92: How's Your Boner?); BONUS CLIP: Summertime Freestyle Rap (Episode 115: The Plug-In Drug); 8. Would You Rather? (Episode 126: Suicide is Painless); BONUS CLIP: Zach's Q&A (Episode 122: Shanghaied By Irene); 7. Chip Gardner's Campaign Strategy (Episode 131: Mayor of Hollywood); BONUS CLIP: Alive or Dead? (Episode 86: The New Year Attack of 2011); 6. Don Dimello (Episode 85: That's One Way of Doing It)	
Episode 137.5: Best of 2011 Pt. 2	12/29/11	Paul F. Tompkins; Andy Richter	5. Cake Boss Contacts Chewbacca (Episode 106.5: It's A Fucking Podcast: Pt. 2); BONUS CLIP: What Am I Thinking? (Episode 121: Bro-ing Out); 4. Huell Howser and the Hadron Collider (Episode 103: These Times They Are A-Changin'); BONUS CLIP: A Worthy Uhhh (Episode 98: A Worthy Uhhh); 3. Hot Dog (Episode 94: Dip Didda Dip Dow!); BONUS CLIP: Back To School Freestyle Rap (Episode 123: No Scoop For You); 2. Don Dimello's Beauty and the Beast (Episode 99: Somethin' For Daddy!); 1. Jack Sjunior and Brian Pieces (Episode 120: Farts and Procreation)	

=== 2012 ===
Episode number	Date	Guests	Synopsis and segments	Featured songs
Episode 138: Ghost Protocol	1/2/12	Andy Richter; Paul F. Tompkins as Werner Herzog	Games: Would You Rather?	"Charlene II (I'm Over You)" by Stephen Colbert with The Black Belles "The Getaway Grandmothers Club" by Don't Stop or We'll Die
Episode 139: Win a Farmhouse	1/9/12	Bob Odenkirk; Brian Huskey as Paul Luzak	Games: Would You Rather?	"I'm Glad You Hurt Your Hand" by Steve Agee & Brian Posehn "Dio" by Tenacious D
Episode 140: Ron Swanson Off	1/16/12	Nick Offerman; James Adomian as Paul Giamatti		"Hulkster in Heaven" by Hulk Hogan and The Wrestling Boot Band
Episode 141: Ladies Night	1/23/12	Tig Notaro; Jamie Denbo as Beverly Ginsberg; Jessica Chaffin as Ronna Glickman	Games: Jukebox Jury	"One Night In Bangkok" by Mike Tyson "Trouble On Dookie Island" by The Lonely Island
Episode 142: Popcorn.com	1/30/12	Tim Heidecker; Eric Wareheim; James Adomian as Dr. Bronner	Games: Would You Rather?	"Rolo Tony" by Tim and Eric "Long Legs" by Tim and Eric
Episode 143: Grammy Spectacular	2/6/12	"Weird Al" Yankovic; Todd Glass; Amy Phillips as Liza Minnelli	Games: Would You Rather?	"Rappin' Rodney" by Rodney Dangerfield
Episode 144: Clones and Oliver Stones	2/13/12	Don't Stop Or We'll Die: (Harris Wittels as himself and Steven Spielberg; Paul Rust as himself and Melvin Pelvin; Michael Cassady as himself and Mark Hamill)	Games: What Am I Thinking?; Would You Rather?	"Deep Down (In The Dusty Meadow)" by Don't Stop or We'll Die "Once In Awhile" by Don't Stop or We'll Die "'Lectric Roller Skates" by Don't Stop or We'll Die "Austin and Ace" by Don't Stop or We'll Die
Episode 145: A Family Affair	2/20/12	David Wain; James Adomian as Gary Busey	Games: Freestyle Rap Battle	"Pencil Neck Geek" by Freddie Blassie
Episode 146: Climbing the Ladder	2/27/12	Reggie Watts; Ben Schwartz; Matt Besser as Björk	Games: Would You Rather?	
Episode 147: Raisin Norman Bates	3/5/12	Paul F. Tompkins as Ice T Greg Proops; James Adomian as Jesse Ventura	Games: Would You Rather?	"Baby Penis In Your Mind" by Sarah Silverman & Laura Silverman "Highly Illogical" by Leonard Nimoy
Episode 148: Wipeout!	3/12/12	Jason Mantzoukas; Andy Daly as Dalton Wilcox, Don Dimello, Hot Dog, August Lindt, Danny Mahoney, Bill Carter, Patrick McMahon, Clive Dundee, and himself		"Baby, Let Me Be" by The Rutles
Episode 149: Live from SXSW 2012	3/19/12	Tim Heidecker; James Adomian as Merrill Shindler; Seth Morris as Bob Ducca; Reggie Watts	Games: Freestyle Rap Battle	
Episode 150: Time Bobby	3/26/12	Bobby Moynihan as Fourvel; Paul F. Tompkins as Andrew Lloyd Webber		"Cerise" by Ken Nordine
Episode 151: Fan Fiction	4/2/12	Fred Savage; Jackie Clarke as Pam Bicell; Gil Ozeri as Len Bicell	Games: Would You Rather?	"Does Your Chewing Gum Lose Its Flavor (On the Bedpost Overnight)?" by Lonnie Donegan
Episode 152: Behind the Irony Curtain	4/9/12	Ed Helms as Dale; Seth Morris	Games: Would You Rather?	"Stu's Song" by Ed Helms "Allentown" by Ed Helms
Episode 153: Jing It Or Ding It!	4/12/12	Will Forte; Leo Allen	Games: Jing It Or Ding It; Would You Rather?	"MacGruber's Theme" by Cornbread Compton & The Silver Lake Chorus "The Perfect Number" by Vicki St. Elmo
Episode 154: Finger Guns	4/16/12	Lennon Parham as Miss Listler; Jessica St. Clair as Marissa Wompler	Games: Jukebox Jury; What Am I Thinking?	"Friends" by Flight of the Conchords
Episode 155: Fingerbang Lindbergh	4/23/12	Patton Oswalt; Chris Tallman as Mark Van Driel	Games: Fart, Marry/Mary, Kiss	"The Getaway Grandmothers Club" by Don't Stop Or We'll Die "Watch Me Do Me" by The Lonely Island
Episode 156: Anniversary Party!	4/30/12	St. Vincent; Zach Galifianakis; Paul F. Tompkins as Cake Boss; Harris Wittels; James Adomian as Christopher Hitchens; Nick Kroll as El Chupacabra and Toph Shay; Brett Gelman; Jessica St. Clair as Marissa Wompler	Games: Harris' Foam Corner	"Surgeon" by St. Vincent "Cheerleader" by St. Vincent "Cruel" by St. Vincent
Episode 157: God Bless America	5/7/12	Bobcat Goldthwait; Paul F. Tompkins as Garry Marshall	Games: Fart, Marry/Mary, Kiss	"America, Fuck Yeah (Bummer Remix)" by Trey Parker "Chicken Monkey Duck" by Mike Phirman
Episode 158: Words with Friends	5/14/12	Gillian Jacobs; Jordan Peele as Jermaine Jones	Games: Would You Rather?	
Episode 159: Apicklelypse	5/21/12	Alison Brie; Jason Mantzoukas; Bob Odenkirk as Saul Goodman	Games: What Am I Thinking?; Would You Rather?	
Episode 160: Slow Dance Boner	5/28/12	Sarah Silverman; Kyle Dunnigan as Del LaRue and Craig	Games: Shorts or Jeans?	"Poop Song" by Sarah Silverman & Laura Marano "Aids Ballad" by Sarah Silverman
Episode 161: Highly Illogical	6/4/12	Reggie Watts; Tim Heidecker; Andy Daly as Don Dimello; Jon Daly as Barry R.		
Episode 162: Best Bro Hang	6/11/12	Andy Samberg; Adam Pally as Bro	Games: Would You Rather?	"Mama" by The Lonely Island "My Mic (Interlude)" by The Lonely Island
Episode 163: Burning Love	6/18/12	Steve Agee; Ken Marino as Mark Orlando; Janet Varney as Carly; Deanna Russo as Tamara G	Games: Would You Rather?	
Episode 164: Clifton Was Here	6/25/12	Bob Zmuda as Tony Clifton; Ben Schwartz	Games: What Am I Thinking?	
Episode 165: Hoo-ah!	7/2/12	Andy Kindler; Loudon Wainwright III; Amy Phillips as Gwyneth Paltrow	Games: Who Said It?	"Double Lifetime" by Loudon Wainwright III "Man and Dog" by Loudon Wainwright III "The Days That We Die" by Loudon Wainwright III
Episode 166: Farts and Procreation 2	7/9/12	Adam Scott; Harris Wittels; Chelsea Peretti		
Episode 167: New No-Nos	7/16/12	Jessica St. Clair as Marissa Wompler; Paul Rust; Jerrod Carmichael	Games: New No-Nos; Would You Rather?	
Episode 168: Breaking Bread	7/23/12	Bob Odenkirk; Matt Besser as The Pope	Games: Would You Rather?	
Episode 169: Immortal Mustache	7/30/12	Jay Chandrasekhar; Paul F. Tompkins as Cake Boss	Games: Would You Rather?	
Episode 170: New Scoop	8/6/12	Martin Starr; Lennon Parham as Ethel Branscome; Neil Campbell	Games: Would You Rather?	"Lost Boy/Friend" by Laura Silverman
Episode 171: Scrog Secretions	8/13/12	Megan Mullally; Nick Kroll as David Eros and El Chupacabra; Stephanie Hunt		"Jack, You're Dead" by Nancy and Beth "The Cool of the Day" by Nancy and Beth "Poop Song" by Sarah Silverman and Laura Marano "It's The Girl" by Nancy and Beth
Episode 172: This is a Safe Zone	8/20/12	Todd Glass; Brian Huskey as Glenn Maxx		
Episode 173: Ride Like Hell	8/27/12	Paul F. Tompkins as Werner Herzog; Paul Scheer as Scott Jeffries; Brent Weinbach	Games: Would You Rather?	
Episode 174: Series Regulars	9/3/12	Lizzy Caplan; John Mulaney as himself and George St Geegland; Nick Kroll as himself and Gil Faizon	Games: Would You Rather?	
Episode 175: Mop Water	9/10/12	Justin Kirk; Paul F. Tompkins as Andrew Lloyd Webber	Start of the fall spectacular of having television stars show up, the first being Justin Kirk who joins host Scott Aukerman to help Andrew Lloyd Webber (Tompkins) regain his memory.	
Episode 176: Out of Bleeps	9/17/12	Amy Poehler; Jason Mantzoukas; James Adomian as Tom Leykis	Games: Speed Round; Freestyle Rap Battle; Would You Rather?	
Episode 177: Penises Abounding	9/24/12	B. J. Novak; Wyatt Cenac; Keegan-Michael Key as Van Davion; Jordan Peele as Mike Smith	Games: Would You Rather?	
Episode 178: Motor Boating Around Town	10/1/12	Rob Corddry; Jessica St. Clair as Marissa Wompler	Games: Would You Rather?	
Episode 179: Pitch Slapped	10/9/12	Adam DeVine; Paul Scheer as Scott Jeffries; Kay Cannon; Hana Mae Lee	Games: Would You Rather?	
Episode 180: Friends Without Words	10/15/12	Gillian Jacobs; Paul F. Tompkins as Garry Marshall; Lauren Lapkus as Tracy	The third in the ongoing saga of Gillian Jacobs and Scott Aukerman's argument over Words with Friends. Garry Marshall (Tompkins) marries Gillian Jacobs, and college student Tracy stops by to tell tales of her time abroad. Games: Would You Rather?	
Episode 181: Happy Endings	10/22/12	Casey Wilson; Adam Pally	Games: Fortunately Unfortunately; Freestyle Rap Battle; Would You Rather?	
Episode 182: Repeat Your Keyword	10/24/12	Tim Heidecker; Joe Wengert as Arthur Steinborn; Lauren Lapkus as Diane		
Episode 183: Return to Suicide House	10/29/12	Brett Gelman as Messmore le Barron, James Gandolfini, Snagglepuss, David Koresh, and Billy Crystal; Jon Daly as Beuford le Barron, Shaggy, Christopher Walken, Santa Claus, Jim Belushi, and Chris Rock; Allan McLeod as Caine Sherman, Ghost Boy, Robert De Niro, and Stephen Hawking; James Adomian as Maximillian Blanc, Ralph Macklevaney, Christopher Hitchens, Jim Jones, and Frank Calliendo	Games: Freestyle Rap Battle	
Episode 184: Pop and Politics	11/5/12	Aziz Ansari; Bob Odenkirk; Neil Campbell; Mike Hanford; James Adomian as Pat Buchanan	Games: Would You Rather?	
Episode 185: Cum Scanners	11/7/12	Chris Hardwick; Ike Barinholtz as JT McDowell	Games: Would You Rather?	
Episode 186: New York Mainstays	11/12/12	Paul F. Tompkins as Garry Marshall; Julie Klausner; Jake Fogelnest	Games: Would You Rather?	
Episode 187: Finger Chimes	11/19/12	Nat Faxon; Lennon Parham as Forsythia	Games: Would You Rather?	
Episode 188: Attack of the Shits	11/26/12	Judd Apatow; Graham Parker; Jessica St. Clair as Marissa Wompler	Games: Would You Rather?	"Stop Cryin' About the Rain" by Graham Parker
Episode 189: The Pancake Man	12/3/12	Chris Fairbanks; Paul F. Tompkins as Werner Herzog	Games: Would You Rather?	
Episode 190: You Know What I Mean?	12/10/12	Demetri Martin; James Adomian as Orson Welles; Pamela Murphy as Nancy Cooper		
Episode 191: 2012 Holiday Spectacular	12/17/12	Harris Wittels; Matt Besser as Björk, Neil Young, and Billy Braggart; Paul Rust; Paul F. Tompkins as Ice-T; Jon Daly as Bill Cosby-Bukowski; Nick Kroll as Liz	Games: Harris' Foam Corner; New No-Nos (referred to as New Ho Ho Hos).	
Best of 2012 Pt. 1	12/24/12	Paul F. Tompkins	10. George St. Geegland & Gil Faizon (Episode 174: Series Regulars); 9. Tracy (Episode 180: Friends Without Words); BONUS: Arthur Steinborn's Memory System (Episode 182: Repeat Your Keyword); 8. Harris' Foam Corner (Episode 156: Anniversary Party!); BONUS: Off the Top (Episode 146: Climbing the Ladder); 7. Woody Allen on Entourage (Episode 162: Best Bro Hang); 6. Miss Listler (Episode 154: Finger Guns)	
Best of 2012 Pt. 2	12/31/12	Paul F. Tompkins "Weird Al" Yankovic	5. New No-Nos (Episode 167: New No-Nos); 4. Dalton Wilcox (Episode 148: Wipeout!); BONUS: Ching Chong Matinee (Episode 161: Highly Illogical); 3. Tom Leykis (Episode 176: Out of Bleeps); BONUS: The Washington Monugents (Episode 184: Pop and Politics); 2. Blaze and Rod Ogg (Episode 166: Farts and Procreation 2); 1. Fourvel (Episode 150: Time Bobby)	

=== 2013 ===
Episode number	Date	Guests	Synopsis and segments	Featured songs
Episode 192: GoodFelines	1/7/13	Ben Schwartz; Horatio Sanz as Shelly Driftwood	Games: Would You Rather?	
Episode 193: What Else? What Else?	1/10/13	Kristen Schaal; Neil Campbell as Rick Faber; Pamela Murphy as Nancy Cooper	Games: Would You Rather?	
Episode 194: Me Gusta Characters!	1/14/13	Nick Kroll as himself, Chance, El Chupacabra & Fabrice Fabrice; Chelsea Peretti as herself and Tootie	Games: Would You Rather?	
Episode 195: Making the Snow Angel	1/21/13	Billy Eichner; Reggie Watts; Matt Besser as Frosty the Snowman	Games: Would You Rather?	
Episode 196: A Different Huelliverse	1/24/13	Jeff Garlin; James Adomian as Huell Howser and Christopher Hitchens		
Episode 197: Please Claire-ify	1/28/13	Tim Heidecker; Paul Rust; Jon Daly as Bill Cosby-Bukowski	Games: New No-Nos; Would You Rather?	
Episode 198: Aren't You Glad	2/4/13	Jeffrey Ross; Ron Sexsmith; Amy Phillips as Sarah Silverman; Neil Campbell as Cam Bilmoth	Games: Would You Rather?	"Sneak Out the Back Door" by Ron Sexsmith
Episode 199: Garry Unmarried	2/6/13	Paul F. Tompkins as Garry Marshall; Gillian Jacobs	Games: Would You Rather?	
Episode 200: Halfway To China	2/11/13	Jason Mantzoukas; Andy Daly as Cactus Tony and Don Dimello		
Episode 201: End Scene	2/18/13	Jon Glaser; Matt Besser as Pope Benedict XVI	Games: Would You Rather?	
Episode 202: Philip Traumatic Seymour Disorder	2/21/13	Nick Thune; James Adomian as Philip Seymour Hoffman and Paul Giamatti; Lauren Lapkus as Todd	Games: Fortunately, Unfortunately	
Episode 203: The Vicar of Yanks	2/25/13	"Weird Al" Yankovic; Paul F. Tompkins as Andrew Lloyd Webber	Games: Would You Rather?	
Episode 204: The Pepper Men	3/4/13	Zach Galifianakis; Jon Daly; Neil Campbell		
Episode 205: Titans of Comedy	3/7/13	Anthony Jeselnik; Eugene Mirman; Nathan Fielder; Eugene Cordero as Jazz Jazz	Games: Would You Rather?	
Episode 206: Live from SXSW 2013	3/11/13	Michael Cera; Sarah Silverman; Tim & Eric; Reggie Watts; Brett Gelman (cameo)	Games: Would You Rather?	
Episode 207: Live from SXSW 2013 II	3/14/13	Ken Marino; Rob Huebel; Natasha Leggero; Martin Starr; Reggie Watts; James Adomian as Jesse Ventura	Games: Would You Rather?	
Episode 208: Zombie Candles	3/18/13	Steven Yeun; Doug Benson; Paul F. Tompkins as Cake Boss	Games: Would You Rather?	
Episode 209: The Bisco Boys	3/22/13	Don't Stop Or We'll Die (Paul Rust, Harris Wittels, Michael Cassady); Howard Kremer	Games: Fortunately, Unfortunately; Would You Rather?	"Bullfrog" by Don't Stop Or We'll Die "Lisa" by Don't Stop Or We'll Die "Sunrise"/"Little Boys" by Don't Stop Or We'll Die "The Good Old Boys" by Don't Stop Or We'll Die "Newborn Baby Colt" by Dragon Boy Suede
Episode 210: A Spiritual Journey	3/25/13	Adam Brody; Lauren Lapkus as Traci Reardon; Joe Wengert as Shelby Orangina	Games: Would You Rather?	
Episode 211: April Fools!	4/1/13	Jon Hamm as himself and El Chupacabro; Nick Kroll as himself, El Chupacabra, and Chilly Willy		
Episode 212: Comedy Bleep Bleep	4/8/13	Brendon Walsh; James Adomian as Gordon Ramsay; Neil Campbell	Games: Would You Rather?	
Episode 213: Star Graves	4/15/13	Jerrod Carmichael; Horatio Sanz as Joe France's		
Episode 214: You Have To Take Action	4/18/13	Jen Kirkman; Pamela Murphy as Karen Porter	Games: Would You Rather?	
Episode 215: Time Bobby 2	4/22/13	Bobby Moynihan as Fourvel and Fryvault; Paul F. Tompkins as Lord Andrew Lloyd Webber		
Episode 216: Top of the Schaal To You!	4/29/13	Kristen Schaal; Neil Campbell as Buford Dorsey; Michaela Watkins as Dr. Sherri Levine	Games: Would You Rather?	
Episode 217: The WTF Hour	5/2/13	Marc Maron	Games: Would You Rather?	
Episode 218: The 4th Anniversary Extravaganza!	5/6/13	David Wain; Lauren Lapkus as Traci Reardon; Jessica St. Clair as Marissa Wompler; Paul F. Tompkins as Mike the Janitor; Jason Mantzoukas; Paul Rust as Benny Bachelor; Neil Campbell as Barrett Bachelor		
Episode 219: Farts and Procreation 3	5/13/13	Adam Scott as himself, Bus Guy #1, Jason Vorges, Edwin and Window Loving Dog #1; Harris Wittels as himself, Bus Guy #2, Clark Griswald, Vince and Window Loving Dog #2; Chelsea Peretti as herself, Coslita, Cheri Oteri and Cheri Oteri	NOTE: No Plugs segment.	
Episode 220: 4 PayDays & A Baby	5/20/13	Lennon Parham as Miss Listler; Jessica St. Clair as Marissa Wompler		
Episode 221: The Cake Council	5/28/13	Andy Richter; Paul F. Tompkins as Cake Boss	Games: Would You Rather?	
Episode 222: A Peanut In The Rain	6/3/13	Paul F. Tompkins as Garry Marshall; Gillian Jacobs; Mike Hanfordas Ducky Powell		
Episode 223: Roll Over, Seth Rogen	6/10/13	Seth Rogen	Games: Fart, Marry, Kiss; What Am I Thinking?; Would You Rather?	
Episode 224: Live from Austin	6/13/13	Paul Scheer as Bill Diesel; Martin Starr; Brandon Johnson; Neil Campbell as Rick Faber	Games: Freestyle Rap Battle, Would You Rather?	
Episode 225: Super Chums	6/17/13	Taran Killam as himself and Mark Johnson Sr. Paul Brittain as himself and Lon Smudge		
Episode 226: ¡Aspira!	6/24/13	Paul Feig; Horatio Sanz as Victor Ramos	Games: Would You Rather?	
Episode 227: All Farted Out	6/27/13	Brian Posehn; Jon Daly as Mall McCartney		
Episode 228: Acapella Cuddle Puddle	7/1/13	John Hodgman; Paul F. Tompkins as Ice-T and Garry Marshall		
Episode 229: Two Thumbs & Not Much Else	7/8/13	Ben Schwartz; Paul F. Tompkins as Werner Herzog		
Episode 230: Something for Everything	7/11/13	Reggie Watts; Neil Campbell	Games: Freestyle Rap Battle, Would You Rather?	
Episode 231: This Is Not Me, This Is Them	7/15/13	Kumail Nanjiani; James Adomian as Paul Giamatti & Jesse Ventura		
Episode 232: LIVE from San Diego Comic-Con	7/18/13	Andy Daly as Hot Dog; Paul Rust	Games: Would You Rather?	
Episode 233: Royal Watching	7/22/13	Bob Odenkirk; Andy Daly as Byron Denniston; David Cross calls in		
Episode 234: Changing the Bandage	7/25/13	Bill Hader; Seth Morris as Bob Ducca	Games: Would You Rather?	
Episode 235: Concert Buddies	7/29/13	Doug Benson; Paul F. Tompkins as Lord Andrew Lloyd Webber	Games: Would You Rather?	
Episode 236: Murderer Heaven	8/5/13	Rob Corddry; Paul F. Tompkins as The Ghost of Richard Harrow	Games: Would You Rather?	
Episode 237: Filipino Blockbuster	8/8/13	Jonah Ray; Nick Thune; Eugene Cordero as Tito Ben	Games: Would You Rather?	
Episode 238: Marissa Wompler's Birthday Pool Party LIVE	8/12/13	Jessica St. Clair as Marissa Wompler; Lennon Parham as Miss Listler and Kimmy; Jason Mantzoukas as Eric “Gutterballs” Gutterman and Kareem; Brian Huskey as Dr. Seth Wompler; Melissa Rauch as Danielle Bartiromo and Katie Wong		
Episode 239: New Dad	8/19/13	Jay Mohr; Matt Besser as New Dad	Games: Would You Rather?	
Episode 240: #TheWorldsEnd	8/23/13	Edgar Wright; Simon Pegg as himself, Michael Caine, and Sean Connery; Nick Frost as himself, Sean Connery, and Michael Caine	Games: Would You Rather?	
Episode 241: The Stallone Bros.	8/26/13	Paul Scheer as himself and Frank Stallone; Nick Kroll as himself and Sylvester Stallone		
Episode 242: Veggie Dongs	9/2/13	Thomas Lennon as himself and Little Gary; Rob Huebel; Neko Case	Games: Would You Rather?	"Local Girl" by Neko Case "Calling Cards" by Neko Case
Episode 243: Blow Me Up Tom!	9/9/13	Maria Bamford; James Adomian as Tom Leykis, Merrill Shindler, and Jesse Ventura		
Episode 244: An Ode to New York!	9/16/13	Andy Samberg; Eddie Pepitone as Eddie Floatley	Games: Would You Rather?	
Episode 245: Poehler Ice Caps	9/23/13	Amy Poehler; Neil Campbell; Paul F. Tompkins as Alan Thicke	Games: Freestyle Rap Battle	
Episode 246: Butthole Baby	9/30/13	Casey Wilson as herself and Janelle Johnson; June Diane Raphael as herself and Jolene Johnson	Games: Would You Rather?	
Episode 247: Half a Score	10/7/13	Tim Meadows; Horatio Sanz as Chico Davis		
Episode 248: Todd's Life 2.0	10/10/13	Eric André; Lauren Lapkus as Todd		
Episode 249: Ice Cold STaB	10/14/13	Bob Odenkirk; The Birthday Boys as themselves and Coke/Pepsi/Tab secret formula holders	Games: Would You Rather?	
Episode 250: Podcast Silence	10/21/13	Pete Holmes; Jon Gabrus as Gino Lombardo; Pamela Murphy as Lisa Bartin		
Episode 251: The Bed Spoiler	10/24/13	Amber Tamblyn; Todd Glass	Games: Would You Rather?	
Episode 252: The Creeeeeeepy Halloween Special	10/28/13	Steven Yeun; Paul Rust as Dr. Traygo; Molly Bretthauer as Dykula; Nick Wiger as Leo Carpazzi; Eva Anderson and Caroline Anderson as The Hauntettes		
Episode 253: Fieri Fight	11/4/13	Tim Heidecker; Jon Daly as himself and Bill Cosby-Bukowski	Games: Tic-Tac-Toe, Would You Rather?	
Episode 254: LIVE from Comedy Gives Back	11/7/13	Zach Galifianakis; David Wain; Andy Daly as Jack Fitzgerald	Games: Would You Rather?	
Episode 255: A Visit from Hee Hee-ll	11/11/13	Rob Delaney; Mookie Blaiklock as Michael Jackson	Games: Would You Rather?	
Episode 256: Raw Copera	11/18/13	Brendon Small; Cameron Esposito; James Adomian as Jesse Ventura		"The Birth / Fata Sidus Oritur / One of Us Must Die" by Dethklok (Brendon Small) "The Duel" by Dethklok (Brendon Small)
Episode 257: Nuts As A Pile Of Nuts	11/21/13	Will Forte as himself and Texter; Paul F. Tompkins as The Ghost of Richard Harrow		
Episode 258: Yoke Jams	11/25/13	Jimmy Pardo; Bill Callahan; Seth Morris as Bob Ducca		"The Sing" by Bill Callahan "Wrecking Ball" by Miley Cyrus (Performed by Bob Ducca) "Small Plane" by Bill Callahan "Ride My Arrow" by Bill Callahan
Episode 259: Charlotte's Website	12/2/13	David Alan Grier; Lauren Lapkus as Regina Crimp; Joe Wengert as Mr. G	Games: Would You Rather?	
Episode 260: Tiny Cheeseburger Story	12/5/13	Mike Birbiglia; Brendon Small as Victor Diamond and Tiny; Jon Gabrus as Gino Lombardo		
Episode 261: Nubile Agape	12/9/13	Kulap Vilaysack; Shelby Fero; Horatio Sanz as Aaron Neville	Games: Would You Rather?	
Episode 262: 2013 Holiday Spectacular	12/16/13	Nick Lowe; Jason Mantzoukas; Andy Daly as Dalton Wilcox; Paul F. Tompkins as Alan Thicke; James Adomian as Merrill Shindler; Jon Daly as Bill Cosby-Bukowski; Neil Campbell as Barrett Bachelor; Paul Rust as Benny Bachelor; Paul Scheer as Frank Stallone		"Christmas at the Airport" by Nick Lowe "The North Pole Express" by Nick Lowe "A Dollar Short of Happy" by Nick Lowe
Best of 2013 Pt. 1	12/23/13	Paul F. Tompkins	15. The Vicar of Yanks (Episode 203: The Vicar of Yanks); 14. The Pepper Men (Episode 204: The Pepper Men); BONUS: New No-Nos 2013 (Episode 197: Please Claire-ify); 13. El Chupacabra y El Chupacabro (Episode 211: April Fools!); BONUS: Werner Herzog's Yelp Hotel Review (Comedy Bang! Bang! 2013 Tour: LIVE from San Francisco with Paul F. Tompkins and Doug Benson); 12. Garry, Gilly, and the Butthole-less Baby (Episode 222: A Peanut In The Rain); BONUS: What A Thrashable Slope (Episode 222: A Peanut In The Rain)	
Best of 2013 Pt. 2	12/26/13	Paul F. Tompkins	11. Frank and Sylvester Stallone (Episode 241: The Stallone Bros.); BONUS: Breaking Bad Finale Spoilers (Episode 249: Ice Cold STaB); 10. The Return of the Tom Leykis Show (Episode 243: Blow Me Up Tom!); 9. Reardon and Wompler and The Bachelor Brothers (Episode 218: The 4th Anniversary Extravaganza!); BONUS: Tito Ben's Karaoke (Episode 237: Filipino Blockbuster); 8. Werner Herzog in Jack Reacher (Episode 229: Two Thumbs & Not Much Else); BONUS: Silent Night by Bjork (Episode 191: 2012 Holiday Spectacular); 7. Richard Harrow (Episode 236: Murderer Heaven)	
Best of 2013 Pt. 3	12/30/13	Paul F. Tompkins	6. Bel-Air Marriage and Divorce (Episode 199: Garry Unmarried); BONUS: Freestyle Rap Battle (Episode 230: Something for Everything); 5. Harris' Foam Corner and Some Characters (Episode 219: Farts and Procreation 3); BONUS: Sean Connery and Michael Caine (Episode 240: #TheWorldsEnd); 4. Poehler vs Campbell vs Thicke Freestyle Rap Battle (Episode 245: Poehler Ice Caps)	

=== 2014 ===
Episode number	Date	Guests	Synopsis and segments	Featured songs
Best of 2013 Pt. 4	1/2/14	Paul F. Tompkins	3. Cactus Tony (Episode 200: Halfway to China); 2. The Platform is Shifting (Episode 238: Marissa Wompler's Birthday Pool Party LIVE); 1. Fourvel and Fryvault (Episode 215: Time Bobby 2)	
Episode 263: Hollywild	1/6/14	Ben Schwartz; Horatio Sanz as Coco Marx	Games: Would You Rather?, Riddle Me This	
Episode 264: Creating A Krolliverse	1/13/14	Nick Kroll as himself, Liz, C-Czar, Sylvester Stallone, and El Chupacabra; Jenny Slate as herself and Pretty Liz		
Episode 265: LIVE from RIOT LA	1/16/14	Paul F. Tompkins as JW Stillwater; Lauren Lapkus as Traci Reardon; Harris Wittels	Games: Harris' Foam Corner, Would You Rather?	
Episode 266: The Calvins Twins	1/20/14	Taran Killam as himself and Smith "Bever Hopox" Calvins; Paul Brittain as himself and Jones "Chico Hands" Calvins		
Episode 267: That Wasn't It (I'm Back) [Hee Hee]	1/27/14	Jerrod Carmichael; Neil Campbell; Mookie Blaiklock as Michael Jackson	Games: Would You Rather?	
Episode 268: What Does the Fonz Say?	1/30/14	Jimmy Pardo; Betsy Sodaro as Voda Gaipsy the Romanian Gypsy	Games: Riddle Me This, Would You Rather?	
Episode 269: Smaug's Kickstarter	2/3/14	Doug Benson; Paul Hornschemeier; Matt Besser as Smaug	Games: Would You Rather?	
Episode 270: Off The Grid	2/10/14	Jon Daly; James Adomian as Jesse Ventura		"Abracadabralifornia" by Jon Daly
Episode 271: Tiny Little Boy Parts	2/13/14	Nick Thune; Molly Bretthauer as Meredith Coldwell	Games: Would You Rather?	
Episode 272: Sex Party Season	2/17/14	Gillian Jacobs; Paul F. Tompkins as Garry Marshall and Len Wiseman		
Episode 273: Vape Cod	2/24/14	Jim O'Heir; Horatio Sanz as Shelly Driftwood		
Episode 274: Oh, Golly!	3/3/14	Jason Mantzoukas; Andy Daly as Gil & Golly and Dalton Wilcox		
Episode 275: LIVE from SXSW 2014	3/10/14	Jonah Ray; Adam Cayton-Holland; James Adomian as The Sheriff of Nottingham	Games: Would You Rather?	
Episode 276: LIVE from SXSW 2014 II	3/14/14	Matt Braunger; Matt Besser as Hooch the Mooch; Jon Gabrus as Gino Lombardo	Games: Would You Rather?	
Episode 277: Comedy Bang Me!	3/17/14	Chelsea Peretti; Paul Rust as Benny Bachelor; Neil Campbell as Barrett Bachelor	Games: Would You Rather?	
Episode 278: Only Tones	3/24/14	Old 97's Matt Berninger; James Adomian as George Zimmer and Russell Crowe	Games: Would You Rather?	"Longer Than You've Been Alive" by Old 97's "Let's Get Drunk and Get It On" by Old 97's "Nashville" by Old 97's
Episode 279: Reverse April Fools	3/31/14	Patton Oswalt; Lauren Lapkus as Traci Reardon; Will Hines as Qthor		
Episode 280: DuALity	4/7/14	"Weird Al" Yankovic; Paul F. Tompkins as Alan Thicke	Games: Riddle Me This	
Episode 281: Bro Boarders	4/14/14	Matt Walsh as himself and XJR& Timothy Simons	Games: Name A Bread, Would You Rather?	
Episode 282: Wompster's University	4/21/14	Jessica St. Clair as Marissa Wompler; Lennon Parham as Miss Listler		
Episode 283: The 5th Anniversary Show!	4/28/14	Jessica St. Clair as Marissa Wompler; Lennon Parham as Miss Listler; Jason Mantzoukas; Lauren Lapkus as Traci Reardon; Matt Besser as Mattilda Besserina Ay Der Bong Boy Retired Pope Smith; Paul F. Tompkins as Mike the Janitor and JW Stillwater; Paul Rust as Benny Bachelor; Neil Campbell as Barrett Bachelor		
Episode 284: A Thrilling CBB Adventure Hour	5/5/14	Marc Evan Jackson; Mark Gagliardi as Croach the Tracker; Paul F. Tompkins as K of the Cosmos and himself	Games: Riddle Me This	
Episode 285: Solo Bolo	5/8/14	Ben Schwartz		
Episode 286: Time Bobby 3	5/12/14	Bobby Moynihan as Fourvel and Fryvault; Paul F. Tompkins as Lord Andrew Lloyd Webber and Werner Herzog		
Episode 287: Stinky Chips	5/19/14	Shane Torres; Lauren Lapkus as Mizz Chips		
Episode 288: Back to Barz, Back to Reality	5/22/14	The Sklar Brothers; Horatio Sanz as Barzelona Marriott	Games: Would You Rather?	
Episode 289: The Exorcism of Cake Boss	5/26/14	Paul F. Tompkins as Cake Boss and Reverend Robert Parcimonie; Matt Gourley as H. R. Giger	Games: Riddle Me This	
Episode 290: Shed Busting	6/2/14	Todd Glass; James Adomian as himself, George W. Bush, Jesse Ventura, Merrill Shindler, and Paul Giamatti		
Episode 291: Summer Haunted House	6/5/14	Bob Odenkirk as himself and Thor Silverblatt; Adam Resnick; Neil Casey as Earl Bixby; Fran Gillespie as Pammy Bixby		
Episode 292: DJs Are Sleaze Js	6/9/14	Jenny Slate; Merrill Garbus; Jon Daly as himself and Sappity Tappity	Games: Would You Rather?	
Episode 293: Monster Muscles	6/12/14	Phil Lord; Chris Miller; Jon Gabrus as Gino Lombardo; Eugene Cordero as R.J. Rise	Games: Riddle Me This	
Episode 294: Honk Shoo	6/16/14	Ian Edwards; Brendon Small as Bernie Fretts; Jessica St. Clair as Marissa Wompler		
Episode 295: I Turned It On For The Dog Penis	6/19/14	Alex Anfanger; Dan Schimp; Lauren Lapkus as Traci Reardon	Games: Riddle Me This	
Episode 296: Taking The Bladder Out	6/23/14	David Wain as himself and Phineas T. Johnson; Michael Showalter; Neil Campbell as Percy Perryweather		
Episode 297: Canadian Apparel	6/30/14	Nathan Fielder; Joe Wengert as Brad Hammerstone; James Adomian as Dov Charney		
Episode 298: The Hotwives of Orlando	7/7/14	Paul Scheer; Danielle Schneider as Shauna Maducci; Tymberlee Hill as Phe Phe Reed; Andrea Savage as Veronica Von Vandervon; Dannah Phirman as Alli	Games: Would You Rather?	
Episode 299: Don't Hack the SAC	7/15/14	"Weird Al" Yankovic; Claudia O'Doherty		"Handy" by "Weird Al" Yankovic "Foil" by "Weird Al" Yankovic "My Own Eyes" by "Weird Al" Yankovic "Mission Statement" by "Weird Al" Yankovic "Lame Claim to Fame" by "Weird Al" Yankovic "NOW That's What I Call Polka!" by "Weird Al" Yankovic "First World Problems" by "Weird Al" Yankovic "Sports Song" by "Weird Al" Yankovic
Episode 300: Oh, Golly! You Devil	7/21/14	Jason Mantzoukas; Andy Daly as Golly, Dalton Wilcox, Danny Mahoney, Ben Alterman, August Lindt, Bill Carter, Patrick McMahon, Hot Dog, Clive Dundee, Andi Callahan, Chip Gardner, Cactus Tony, Byron Denniston, and Don Dimello		
Episode 301: They're Twins Jonah	7/28/14	Jonah Ray; Kumail Nanjiani; Brendon Small as Victor Diamond and Tiny	Games: Riddle Me This	
Episode 302: Milkshake Movies	7/31/14	Mary Lynn Rajskub; Twin Shadow; Eddie Pepitone as Howard Amethyst		"The One" by Twin Shadow "Locked and Loaded" by Twin Shadow "To the Top" by Twin Shadow
Episode 303: Puttering Around	8/04/14	Paul F. Tompkins as himself, Andrew Lloyd Webber, and Cake Boss; Loudon Wainwright III		"Haven't Got the Blues (Yet)" by Loudon Wainwright III "Here Come the Choppers" by Loudon Wainwright III "Spaced" by Loudon Wainwright III
Episode 304: Marissa Wompler's Six Flags Birthday Womptacular	8/11/14	Jessica St. Clair as Marissa Wompler; Lennon Parham as Miss Listler, Kimmy, and Philippe; Jason Mantzoukas as Eric “Gutterballs” Gutterman and Kareem; Brian Huskey as Dr. Seth Wompler; Melissa Rauch as Danielle Bartiromo and Katie Wong; Lauren Lapkus as Traci Reardon and Liz; Andy Daly as Don Dimello	NOTE: also featuring Scott Aukerman as Dabney and Andy Daly's daughter as Birthday Girl	
Episode 305: CattleLickItUp	8/18/14	Kulap Vilaysack; Howard Kremer; Jon Gabrus as Gino Lombardo	Games: Would You Rather?	
Episode 306: Project Funway	8/21/14	Don't Stop Or We'll Die (Paul Rust, Harris Wittels, Michael Cassady)	Games: Harris' Foam Corner, New No-Nos, Riddle Me This	"Blood" by Don't Stop Or We'll Die "Central Park" by Don't Stop Or We'll Die "For the Revolution" by Don't Stop Or We'll Die "Alfred E. Neuman/Sylvester P. Smith" by Don't Stop Or We'll Die
Episode 307: Ruth's Ross Dress For Loss	8/25/14	Tenacious D (Jack Black and Kyle Gass); Lauren Lapkus as Regina Crimp; Joe Wengert as Russ	Games: The Guessing Game	
Episode 308: Superego: Loose Beginnings, Tight Ends	9/1/14	Matt Gourley as himself and H. R. Giger; Mark McConville as himself and Trevor; Jeremy Carter as himself and Bryson Tyson; Paul F. Tompkins as himself and Reverend Robert Parcimonie		
Episode 309: Tony Macaroni	9/08/14	Nick Kroll as himself and R. Schrift; Jimmy Pardo; Claudia O'Doherty		
Episode 310: Little Button Puss	9/15/14	Kevin Allison; Pamela Murphy as Bridgette Murphy; John Gemberling as HP-DP-69B	Games: Riddle Me This	
Episode 311: Denny's Boys	9/18/14	Joe Lo Truglio; Beth Dover as Saman Thughgh	Games: Would You Rather?	
Episode 312: Grounded Me@	9/22/14	Andy Samberg; Lauren Lapkus as Todd	Games: What Am I Thinking?, Would You Rather?	
Episode 313: Gumbo Challenge	9/29/14	Ben Schwartz; Paul Banks; Horatio Sanz as Dante and Aaron Neville	Games: Would You Rather?	
Episode 314: Y’all Heard Any of These Names Before?	10/6/14	Cameron Esposito; Paul F. Tompkins as JW Stillwater	Games: Y’all Heard Any of These Names Before?	
Episode 315: Sandwich Therapy	10/13/14	Ken Marino; Casey Wilson; Joe Wengert as Dr. Jerry Pensacola	Games: Riddle Me This	
Episode 316: In the Larp Run	10/16/14	Dane Cook; Reggie Watts; Neil Campbell as Rick Faber	Games: Would You Rather?	
Episode 317: Tash.2	10/20/14	Natasha Lyonne; Paul F. Tompkins; Mary Holland as Dreama Peaches		
Episode 318: Lumber Hack	10/27/14	Wyatt Cenac; Matt Besser as Paul Funyuns; Jocelyn DeBoer as Bitsy Boo-Carmichael		
Episode 319: Return to Suicide House Part Gore	10/30/14	Brett Gelman as Messmore le Barron; Jon Daly as Beuford le Barron; Allan McLeod as Ghost Boy; Nick Wiger as Leo Carpazzi; Caroline Anderson as Scaroline	Games: Freestyle Rap Battle	
Episode 320: Charging Kids	11/3/14	Alex Borstein; Brendon Small as Victor Diamond and Tiny; Molly Bretthauer as Miss D.		
Episode 321: Big Fat Voice	11/10/14	Ana Gasteyer; Jon Gabrus as Gino Lombardo; Mookie Blaiklock as Officer Jay Gutwill	Games: Riddle Me This	"A Proper Cup of Coffee" by Ana Gasteyer "One Mint Julep" by Ana Gasteyer
Episode 322: YouTube Phenomahna	11/17/14	Chelsea Peretti; Seth Morris as Lou Ciello		
Episode 323: Pie Quiz with Tears for Fears	11/24/14	Tears For Fears; Reggie Watts; Paul F. Tompkins as Barnaby Valastrok, the Pie Minister		
Episode 324: Golden Duchess Cruise Lines	12/1/14	Colin Hanks; Lauren Lapkus as Marla Charles; Stephanie Allynne as Pam John; Mary Holland as Margie Donk; Erin Whitehead as Carol Sheldon	Games: Would You Rather?	
Episode 325: Musical Organs	12/8/14	Skylar Astin; Rory Scovel; Pamela Murphy as Jewel's; Will Hines as Markis Campbell	Games: Would You Rather?	
Episode 326: 2014 Holiday Spectacular	12/15/14	Aimee Mann; Ted Leo; Paul F. Tompkins as Len Wiseman; Matt Gourley as Ian Fleming; Matt Besser as Björk; Brendon Small as Victor Diamond and Tiny; Lauren Lapkus as Ho Ho; James Adomian as Orson Welles; Neil Campbell as Logan Conley		"You Can't Help Me Now" by The Both "Volunteers of America" by The Both "Nothing Left to Do (Let's Make This Christmas Blue)" by The Both
Best of 2014 Pt. 1	12/22/14	Paul F. Tompkins	15. HP-DP-69B (Episode 310: Little Button Puss); 14. The Victor Podcast (Episode 301: They're Twins Jonah); 13. JW Stillwater (Episode 265: LIVE From RIOT LA); 12. Bever Hopox and Chico Hands (Episode 266: The Calvins Twins)	
Best of 2014 Pt. 2	12/25/14	Paul F. Tompkins	11. R. Shrift (Episode 309: Tony Macaroni); 10. Len Wiseman (Episode 272: Sex Party Season); 9. Coco Marx (Episode 263: Hollywild); 8. Mike the Janitor and Traci Reardon (Episode 283: The 5th Anniversary Show!)	
Best of 2014 Pt. 3	12/29/14	Paul F. Tompkins	7. Hollywood Facts (Episode 312: Grounded Me@); 6. Benny Schwaz (Episode 285: Solo Bolo); 5. Dabney! (Episode 304: Marissa Wompler's Six Flags Birthday Womptacular); 4. Fourvel Returns (Episode 286: Time Bobby 3)	

=== 2015 ===
Episode number	Date	Guests	Synopsis and segments	Featured songs
Best of 2014 Pt. 4	1/1/15	Paul F. Tompkins	3. Giger Possesses Cake Boss (Episode 289: The Exorcism of Cake Boss); 2. Gil & Golly (Episode 274: Oh, Golly!); 1. The Battle Between Good and Evil (Episode 300: Oh, Golly! You Devil)	
Episode 327: Bang! Bang! Into Your Mouth!	1/5/15	Ben Schwartz; Horatio Sanz as himself and Uncle Stoney	Games: Would You Rather?	
Episode 328: Beatle Heaven	1/8/15	American Football; Anders Holm; Mike Hanford as John Lennon	Games: Would You Rather?	"Never Meant" by American Football "The Summer Ends" by American Football "For Sure" by American Football
Episode 329: Too Much Tuna Tour	1/12/15	Nick Kroll as himself and Gil Faizon; John Mulaney as George St Geegland	Games: Get To The Gifts	
Episode 330: Peruvian Pullovers	1/19/15	Jim Rash; Horatio Sanz as Shelly Driftwood	Games: Would You Rather?	
Episode 331: Secret Superlatives	1/26/15	Patton Oswalt; Lauren Lapkus as Benjamin Susix III; Mary Holland as Trabitha Tarteen		
Episode 332: What Winsome Said	2/2/15	Kyle Kinane; Matt Braunger; Neil Campbell as Winsome Prejudice; Fran Gillespie as Missy Prejudice	Games: Riddle Me This	
Episode 333: Pit Stop	2/9/15	Jack Antonoff; Horatio Sanz as Jacob Brooks; Miriam Tolan as Susan Brooks		
Episode 334: The Dream Team	2/12/15	David Cross; James Adomian as himself and Slavoj Žižek; Matt Walsh as himself and Corny Grandpa	Games: Would You Rather?	
Episode 335: The Wedding of Gilli and Garry	2/16/15	Colin Hay; Paul F. Tompkins as Len Wiseman, Garry Marshall, Reverend Robert Parcimonie, and Alan Thicke; Gillian Jacobs		"Did You Just Take the Long Way Home" by Colin Hay "I Want You Back" by Colin Hay "Next Year People" by Colin Hay
Episode 336: NOT Farts and Procreation 4	2/23/15	Adam Scott; Harris Wittels; Chelsea Peretti	Opens and closes with two separate tributes to Harris Wittels, who died eight days after this episode was recorded. Games: Harris' Foam Corner	
Episode 337: The Ying and the Yankovic	3/2/15	"Weird Al" Yankovic; Paul F. Tompkins as Lord Andrew Lloyd Webber; Joe Wengert as Doug Doyzoice	Games: Would You Rather?	
Episode 338: Be My Guest, Literally!	3/9/15	Michael Ableson; Paul F. Tompkins as Werner Herzog and Santa Claus; Lauren Lapkus as Ho Ho; Andy Daly as Jean Claude Pepi	Games: Name French Actors, Would You Rather?	
Episode 339: LIVE from SXSW 2015	3/16/15	Lauren Lapkus as Todd; Colin Hanks; Nick Kroll as himself, El Chupacabra, and Sylvester Stallone; Horatio Sanz as Kanye West	Games: Would You Rather?	
Episode 340: LIVE from SXSW 2015 II	3/19/15	Tig Notaro; Stephanie Allynne as Hannah Harpie; Mary Holland as Helen Harpie; Lauren Lapkus as Hortense Harpie; James Adomian as Tom Leykis	Games: Would You Rather?	
Episode 341: Banging the Table with Stars	3/23/15	Stars; Claudia O'Doherty; Neil Campbell as Brian Barber	Games: Would You Rather?	"This Is the Last Time" by Stars "Elevator Love Letter" by Stars
Episode 342: A Silicon Valley P-Cast	3/30/15	Thomas Middleditch as himself, Joey Tortellini, and China; Kumail Nanjiani; Martin Starr; Paul F. Tompkins as Jarles	Games: Would You Rather?	
Episode 343: Athlete's Head	4/6/15	Alicia Witt; Jon Gabrus as Gino Lombardo; Brendon Small as Victor Diamond and Tiny		
Episode 344: Classic Switcheroo	4/9/15	Ryan Hansen; Jamie Chung; Horatio Sanz; Jocelyn DeBoer as Bitsy Boo-Carmichael; Paul F. Tompkins as Jarles		
Episode 345: Shifting Bouncy	4/13/15	Kyle Bornheimer; Paul Brittain as himself, Michael Explosione, Jr., Michael Explosione, Sr., and Steve Explosione; Roman Sklar		
Episode 346: That Is Wild	4/20/15	Tom Green; Mary Holland as Trabitha Tarteen; Erin Whitehead as Gale Burbiglia		
Episode 347: Foley Slumber Party	4/23/15	Kevin Pollak; Seth Morris as Andy Pappage; Nick Kroll calls in	Games: One Word Impressions	
Episode 348: Is Y'all My Daddy?	4/27/15	Cameron Esposito; Paul F. Tompkins as J.W. Stillwater; Matt Gourley as Jim Chambers/Professor Stillwater		
Episode 349: The 6th Anniversary Show!	5/4/15	Paul F. Tompkins as Cake Boss, Alan Thicke, and Santa Claus; Lauren Lapkus as Ho Ho; Thomas Middleditch as Klaus Schneider; Neil Campbell as The Time Keeper; Mike Hanford as John Lennon; Joe Wengert as Brad Hammerstone; Paul Scheer as The Rickster; Erin Whitehead as Chad Warren		
Episode 350: Helmets, Aqueduct, Crucifixion, and Boobs	5/11/15	Andy Richter; Andy Daly as Byron Denniston		
Episode 351: CBB: The Movie	5/18/15	Sean Clements; Hayes Davenport; Ben Rodgers as Bang Rodgers; Hayley Huntley as Hayley Shields		
Episode 352: Scrunchy Face	5/25/15	Nick Swardson; James Adomian as Bernie Sanders; Will Hines as Jacob Cloudy	Games: Would You Rather?	
Episode 353: Goodbye Reggie!	6/1/15	Reggie Watts; Neil Campbell; Mike Mitchell as BB-8	Games: Freestyle Rap Battle	
Episode 354: Solo Bolo: Dos Lo	6/4/15	Ben Schwartz	Games: Riddle Me This, Solo Bolo Olympic Song Challenge	
Episode 355: Kid Detectives	6/8/15	Lauren Lapkus as herself and Murphy O’Malaman; Thomas Middleditch as himself and JJ O’Malaman		
Episode 356: Heynong Man	6/15/15	Jason Mantzoukas; Paul F. Tompkins as Mike the Janitor		
Episode 357: Modern Anti-Comedy	6/22/15	Natasha Leggero; Jeremy Konner; Brendon Small as Victor Diamond and Tiny; Betsy Sodaro as Mrs. Potts		
Episode 358: Freddie Mercury To Me	6/25/15	Beck Bennett; Mike Hanford as Alfie Kangas; Neil Campbell as Denver Coward		
Episode 359: TofuPeople	6/29/15	Jonah Ray; Kumail Nanjiani; Horatio Sanz as Shelly Driftwood; Erin Whitehead as Elaine the Dragon	Games: Would You Rather?	
Episode 360: Snow Dome	7/6/15	Jimmy Pardo; Paul Brittain as himself and Fitch Pender		
Episode 361: Waiting for Infinnerty	7/9/15	Dan Finnerty; Jon Gabrus as Gino Lombardo; John Gemberling as Ton Limen		
Episode 362: RomanTig	7/13/15	Tig Notaro; Stephanie Allynne as herself and Dorothea Shirley; Mookie Blaiklock as Vin Diesel		
Episode 363: Wet Hot Crew	7/20/15	David Wain; Molly Shannon; Rich Sommer; Marguerite Moreau	Games: Would You Rather?	
Episode 364: The Marm of Smarm Returns	7/23/15	Michael Ian Black; Lauren Lapkus as Todd	Games: Riddle Me This	
Episode 365: Bongo vs. Bongos	7/27/15	Jason Mantzoukas; Andy Daly as Joe Bongo; Paul F. Tompkins as Jarles		
Episode 366: Cafeteriapalooza	8/3/15	Bobcat Goldthwait; Joe Wengert as Frank Frank; Will Hines as Dusty Stevens		
Episode 367: Bits, Riffs, and Friendships	8/6/15	Brett Gelman; Jon Daly; Tim Heidecker		
Episode 368: Rick Bic For President	8/10/15	Paul Scheer as himself and Rick Bic; Rob Huebel as himself and Dick Butterfield	Games: Would You Rather?	
Episode 369: The Hotwives of Las Vegas	8/13/15	Andrea Savage as herself and Ivanka Silversan; Casey Wilson as herself and Jenfer Beudon; Dannah Phirman as herself and Leona Carpeze; Danielle Schneider as herself and Denise Funt		
Episode 370: The Brochelor	8/17/15	Paul F. Tompkins as himself and Chin Dollhouse; Matt Gourley as himself and Danielle Steel		
Episode 371: You Got PreDICted!	8/24/15	Jemaine Clement; Lauren Lapkus as Juniper Flagen; Mary Holland as Peony Flagen; Stephanie Allynne as Shrub Flagen; Erin Whitehead as Hyacinth Flagen		
Episode 372: Motown Tea	8/31/15	Diane Coffee; Mike Hanford as John Lennon; Horatio Sanz as Skip Garcia		"Not That Easy" by Diane Coffee "Mayflower" by Diane Coffee
Episode 373: Vocal Fry	9/7/15	Eric Stonestreet; Brendon Small as Victor Diamond, Tiny, and Willard “Willy” Mapleton		
Episode 374: Tick Tock Clawk	9/10/15	Neil Campbell as Maxwell Keeper/The Time Keeper; Paul Rust; Fran Gillespie as Marco	Games: New No-Nos, Old Yes-Yeses, Would You Rather?	
Episode 375: Wompler's REAL 17th B-Day Womptacular	9/14/15	Jessica St. Clair as Marissa Wompler; Lennon Parham as Miss Listler; Brian Huskey as Dr. Seth Wompler and Queth Wompler; Seth Morris as Dr. Lionel Drioche; Lauren Lapkus as Traci Reardon; Jason Mantzoukas as Eric "Gutterballs" Gutterman and Kareem	NOTE: also featuring Scott Aukerman as Dabney	
Episode 376: Romantic Tommy D	9/17/15	Peaches; Claudia O'Doherty; Will Hines as Clayton Purdy		"Dick in the Air" by Peaches "Rub" by Peaches
Episode 377: Good Night in the Morning	9/21/15	Tatiana Maslany as herself and Belissima; Kristian Bruun as himself and Phil Collins; Paul F. Tompkins as Chazmin and Scarsdale; Lauren Lapkus as Sunny, Salantame, and Scarsdale	Games: Would You Rather?	
Episode 378: Mailer Daemon	9/28/15	Jason Mantzoukas as himself and Jeffrey Characterwheaties; Nick Kroll as himself, the Mailer Daemon, Dr. Conrad Murray, Live Taylor, and Fabrice Fabrice		
Episode 379: Realies and Fictionals	10/5/15	Alia Shawkat; Angela Trimbur; Adam DeVine; Jon Gabrus as Gino Lombardo; Pamela Murphy as Cutie Cake		
Episode 380: A Colinary Journey	10/8/15	Colin Hanks; Eagles of Death Metal; Matt Walsh as Maximilian Lugner; Brian Huskey as Dr. Hiro Tokyo, Tommy, and Boys		
Episode 381: Kitchen Stand-Up	10/12/15	Nathan Fielder; Anthony Jeselnik; Drew Tarver as Terry Burkhalter	Games: Would You Rather?	
Episode 382: Doing It the Savage Way	10/19/15	Fred Savage; Wayne Federman; Matt Gourley as H. R. Giger		
Episode 383: Return to Suicide House Part Boo	10/26/15	Brett Gelman as Messmore le Barron; Jon Daly as Beuford le Barron, Bill Cosby, and Bill Cosby 2 Nick Wiger as Leo Carpazzi; Paul Rust as Dr. Traygo; Caroline Anderson as Scaroline	Games: Freestyle Rap Battle	
Episode 384: Numbers Cannot Lie	11/2/15	Jason Mantzoukas; Paul F. Tompkins as Atherton Witherflower		
Episode 385: The Beatles of Cults	11/9/15	John Mulaney; Lauren Lapkus as Big Sue; Betsy Sodaro as Nancy K		
Episode 386: Titbit for Tatbit	11/16/15	Bob Odenkirk; David Cross; Mike O'Brien as Zin Bradley; Paul F. Tompkins as himself and Reverend Robert Parcimonie		
Episode 387: Most Multiple Personalities	11/19/15	John Grant; John Gemberling as Tom Jimson; Jocelyn DeBoer as Delna		"Grey Tickles, Black Pressure" by John Grant "Global Warming" by John Grant
Episode 388: Breath Before Death	11/23/15	Neko Case; Mike Hanford as John Lennon; Mookie Blaiklock as himself and Michael Jackson		
Episode 389: Travel Agent-Si!	11/30/15	Mary Elizabeth Ellis; Drew Tarver as Randy Travels; Dan Lippert as Dr. Frankie Beans		
Episode 390: The Oh, Hello Show	12/7/15	Eugene Mirman; John Mulaney as George St. Geegland; Nick Kroll as Gil Faizon		
Episode 391: 2015 Holiday Spectacular	12/14/15	Paul F. Tompkins as Andrew Lloyd Webber; Lauren Lapkus as Ho Ho; Jon Gabrus as Gino Lombardo; Mike Hanford as John Lennon; Neil Campbell as The Time Keeper; Will Hines as David Bunting		
Episode 392: The Holiday Womptacular	12/17/15	Jessica St. Clair as Marissa Wompler; Lennon Parham as Miss Listler and Barbra Streisand; Brian Huskey as Dr. Seth Wompler; Jason Mantzoukas as Eric "Gutterballs" Gutterman; Seth Morris as Ms. Anderson and Dr. Lionel Drioche; Danielle Schneider as Rhonda DeLuce; Jon Daly as Matt Yanni	NOTE: also featuring Scott Aukerman as Dabney Coleperson	
Best of 2015 Pt. 1	12/21/15	Paul F. Tompkins	14. George & Gil's Eulogies for the Passed (Episode 329: Too Much Tuna Tour); 13. Benny Schwaz and Uncle Stoney (Episode 327: Bang! Bang! Into Your Mouth!); 12. Live Reading the Script (Episode 351: CBB: The Movie); 11. The Ceremony Begins (Episode 335: The Wedding of Gilli and Garry)	
Best of 2015 Pt. 2	12/24/15	Paul F. Tompkins	10. Talkin' Tang with Joe Bongo (Episode 365: Bongo vs. Bongos); 9. Solo Bolo Olympic Song Challenge (Episode 354: Solo Bolo: Dos Lo); 8. Scarsdale! (Episode 377: Good Night in the Morning); 7. Jeffrey Characterwheaties (Episode 378: Mailer Daemon)	
Best of 2015 Pt. 3	12/28/15	Paul F. Tompkins	6. Time, Drums, and Ducks (Episode 349: The 6th Anniversary Show!); 5. Joey Tortellini (Episode 342: A Silicon Valley P-Cast); BONUS: Gino Lombardo montage 4. Santa vs. Scott (Episode 338: Be My Guest, Literally!)	
Best of 2015 Pt. 4	12/31/15	Paul F. Tompkins; Jason Mantzoukas calls in	3. Four Washington Lane! (Episode 355: Kid Detectives); 2. In Memory of Harris (Episode 336: NOT Farts and Procreation 4); 1. Birth of a Catchphrase (Episode 356: Heynong Man)	

=== 2016 ===
Episode number	Date	Guests	Synopsis and segments	Featured songs
Episode 393: Peanuts Awareness	1/4/16	Ben Schwartz; Horatio Sanz as himself and Ted Ronson	Games: Would You Rather?	
Episode 394: Wisconsin Sugar Babies	1/11/16	Zach Galifianakis; Lauren Lapkus as Todd; Tim Baltz as Don Darling		
Episode 395: Yupparently	1/18/16	Whitney Cummings; John Gemberling as Gene Rottenberry; Mary Holland as Linda Gravel		
Episode 396: The Intern Challenge	1/21/16	Rob Huebel; Jon Gabrus as Gino Lombardo; Jessica St. Clair as Marissa Wompler		
Episode 397: My Silly Moss Man	1/25/16	"Weird Al" Yankovic; Lauren Lapkus as Dimples and Mrs. Blarrr; Joe Wengert as Cody Calavera		
Episode 398: Prayer Orgy	2/1/16	Samantha Bee; Drew Tarver as Craig Bieber; Ryan Gaul as Ron Bieber		
Episode 399: Trump vs. Bernie	2/4/16	Gilbert Gottfried; James Adomian as Bernie Sanders and Jesse Ventura; Anthony Atamanuik as Donald Trump		
Episode 400: The War on Surfing	2/8/16	Jason Mantzoukas; Andy Daly as Hot Dog		
Episode 401: LOVE Is Thicker Than Water	2/15/16	Paul Rust; Gillian Jacobs; Paul F. Tompkins as Alan Thicke and Garry Marshall	Games: New No-Nos	
Episode 402: Solo Bolo Trolo	2/18/16	Ben Schwartz	Games: Riddle Me This, Solo Bolo Olympic Song Challenge, What Am I Thinking?	
Episode 403: This Ain’t Now, This is Then	2/22/16	Adam Scott; Tim Baltz as Randy Snutz; Dan Ahdoot as Tebow Lebow		
Episode 404: The Timeys Leap Year Celebration	2/29/16	Neil Campbell as The Time Keeper; Jessica Jean Jardine as The Sun Dialer; Ronnie Adrian as The Clock Facer; Betsy Sodaro as The Watch Maker; Carl Tart as The Old Timer; Tim Kalpakis as The Time Master	NOTE: There is a segment after the post-episode ad and Earwolf credits with Paul F. Tompkins as JW Stillwater.	
Episode 405: Space Chemistry	3/3/16	Jillian Bell; Charlotte Newhouse; Matt Gourley as Irvin Kershner; James Bladon as Sir Alec Guinness		
Episode 406: Kid Detectives II	3/7/16	Thomas Middleditch as J.J. O'Malaman; Lauren Lapkus as Murphy O'Malaman and Todd		
Episode 407: Shut the Fuck Door!	3/14/16	Paul F. Tompkins; Dan Ahdoot as himself and Felix Heist; Drew Tarver as himself and Wiliger Wronge; Mandell Maughan as herself and Stacey Keeks; Ryan Gaul as himself and Dean Unda; Tawny Newsome as herself and Margita Chelco; Tim Baltz as himself and Olivier Wronge		
Episode 408: LIVE at SXSW 2016	3/17/16	Ben Schwartz; Jon Gabrus as Gino Lombardo; Nick Kroll as Sylvester Stallone; Paul F. Tompkins as Len Wiseman		
Episode 409: Man Brats	3/21/16	Taran Killam as Bryce Cripple; Paul Brittain as Tob Handlez		
Episode 410: You Know John Leguizamo	3/28/16	Jerrod Carmichael; Joe Wengert as Angel Coliciwo; Neil Campbell as Pam Steensma		
Episode 411: The Phony Marony Show with The Thermals	3/31/16	The Thermals; Mike Hanford as John Lennon; Tim Kalpakis as Tony B.		"My Heart Went Cold" by The Thermals "Thinking of You" by The Thermals "The Walls" by The Thermals
Episode 412: Little Whittle Whistle	4/4/16	Cameron Esposito; Paul F. Tompkins as J.W. Stillwater and Richard Harrow; Matt Gourley as Professor Stillwater		
Episode 413: Cranking It To Coldplay	4/7/16	Tom Scharpling; Jon Daly as John Daly		
Episode 414: Hollywood Handbook Comedy! (Hollywood Edition)	4/11/16	Sean Clements; Hayes Davenport	Games: Would You Rather?, Riddle Me This! (Dragon Edition), Fart, Mary, Kiss	
Episode 415: The Longest Pig Pile	4/14/16	Rob Corddry; Jon Gabrus as Gino Lombardo; Brian Huskey as himself and Gustav Dudamel; Erinn Hayes		
Episode 416: Silicone Bralley Poo Crew	4/18/16	Thomas Middleditch as himself, Turd Dunkweed, and China; Kumail Nanjiani; Martin Starr		
Episode 417: The 3 Year Diet	4/25/16	Shane Torres; Tim Baltz as Ron Petty; Ryan Gaul as Dr. Peter Fash		
Episode 418: Paul Reiser and The Apple Tree	4/28/16	Paul Reiser; Brendon Small as Victor Diamond, Tiny, and Willard “Willy” Mapleton		
Episode 419: The 7th Anniversary Show!	5/2/16	Jason Mantzoukas; Paul F. Tompkins as himself and Thomas Lennon; Horatio Sanz as Shelly Driftwood; Neil Campbell as The Time Keeper; Mike Hanford as John Lennon; Tim Baltz as Olivier Wronge; Drew Tarver as Wiliger Wronge		
Episode 420: Todd Is Too High with Rogue Wave	5/9/16	Rogue Wave; Haley Joel Osment; Lauren Lapkus as Todd		"Look At Me" by Rogue Wave "Falling" by Rogue Wave "Ocean" by Rogue Wave "Plug Up the Toilet" by Ghetto Astronauts "Endless Supply" by Rogue Wave
Episode 421: I Got Your Results	5/16/16	Maria Bamford; Will Hines as Brock Stone		
Episode 422: The WoodyVerse	5/19/16	Chris Gethard; Anthony Atamanuik as Woody Allen; Connor Ratliff as George Lucas; Shannon O'Neill as Renalda		
Episode 423: Time Bobby 4	5/23/16	Bobby Moynihan as Fourvel and Fourandahalfvel; Paul F. Tompkins as Lord Andrew Lloyd Webber		
Episode 424: Almost Parasites	5/30/16	"Weird Al" Yankovic; Kate Berlant as Greg Kerns; Drew Tarver as Crap Pollo		
Episode 425: Sunday Afternoon Taped	6/2/16	Andy Samberg; Claudia O'Doherty; Nick Kroll as R. Schrift, the Mailer Daemon, Fabrice Fabrice, himself, Sylvester Stallone, El Chupacabra, Mrs. Doubtfire, Bill Maher, Creaky Gate, and Gil Faizon		
Episode 426: Schwartz & Schwarts	6/6/16	Ben Schwartz; Horatio Sanz as himself and Barney Schwarts		
Episode 427: True Russian Facts	6/13/16	Natasha Leggero; Riki Lindhome; Dan Mangan; Craig Cackowski as Mikhail Titscoffski	Games: Would You Rather?	"Mouthpiece" by Dan Mangan "Basket" by Dan Mangan "New Skies" by Dan Mangan
Episode 428: Get Donk’d	6/16/16	Rhys Darby; Mary Holland as Margie Donk; Londale Theus Jr. as Reggie Tote		
Episode 429: Almost Mandatory	6/20/16	Jason Mantzoukas; Thomas Middleditch as himself and Edmond Carlyle		
Episode 430: Man Veils	6/27/16	Kristian Bruun; Jessica McKenna as Beth; Zeke Nicholson as B.Q.	Games: How Dumb Are You As A Canadian?, Would You Rather?	
Episode 431: Ghost Pets Are Liars	6/30/16	Brett Gelman; Mike O'Brien as Chris Dante; Tawny Newsome as Ydeda Elaine Brown		
Episode 432: Dana Carvey's Micro-Impressions	7/4/16	Dana Carvey; John Gemberling as HP-DP-69B; Drew Tarver as Little Dammit Man		
Episode 433: Government Pizza	7/11/16	Aparna Nancherla; Jeremy Rowley as Ming; Ryan Gaul as Doug Gropes		
Episode 434: Doubt About That	7/14/16	Brent Weinbach; Brendon Small as Victor Diamond, Tiny, and Willard “Willy” Mapleton; Erin Whitehead as Patty Pecker		
Episode 435: Jim Gaffigan Says No	7/18/16	Jim Gaffigan; Eugene Cordero as Tito Ben; Will Hines as Matt Knight		
Episode 436: Rich Mind Vain	7/25/16	Sean Clements as himself and Rich Mind Vain; Chris Tallman as Nick Nolte; Eliza Skinner as Angelica Trashmouth		
Episode 437: Fart Face Fuckers 2	8/1/16	Mike Birbiglia; Horatio Sanz as himself and Dr. Bill Phil; Mary Holland as herself and Lisa Taco		
Episode 438: Hair Take It	8/8/16	Cameron Esposito; River Butcher; Paul F. Tompkins as Al A. Peterson		
Episode 439: It's Great (An Improv Team)	8/11/16	Adam Pally as himself and Bro; Nick Kroll as himself and R. Schrift		
Episode 440: Pop-TarTender	8/15/16	Todd Glass; Jon Gabrus as Gino Lombardo; Matt Besser as LaMary		
Episode 441: Your Cousin Marvin	8/22/16	Jason Mantzoukas; Carl Tart as Marvin Phelps; Neil Campbell as Larry the Loner		
Episode 442: Atlantis Dire Warning	8/29/16	Andy Daly as Neptuna and Dalton Wilcox; Jeremy Rowley as Ming		
Episode 443: This Is Your Boy Troy	9/5/16	Adam Scott; Will Hines as Jack Sparks; Jessica McKenna as This Is Your Boy Troy		
Episode 444: Mind Your Please and Questions	9/12/16	Tig Notaro; Mike Hanford as John Lennon; Drew Tarver as Mr. Manners		
Episode 445: Sully Goose	9/15/16	Michelle Biloon; Paul F. Tompkins as Captain Chesley "Sully" Sullenberger		
Episode 446: Scrounging and Lounging	9/19/16	Tatiana Maslany; Kristian Bruun; Mary Holland as Janice Cramps; Paul F. Tompkins as Big Chunky Bubbles		
Episode 447: These Are the Worst	9/26/16	Aya Cash; Kether Donohue; Zeke Nicholson as Bone Queef; Kate Berlant as Daniel		
Episode 448: Master of Horror	10/3/16	Robert Kirkman; Ryan Gaul as Doug Gropes; John Gemberling as Mart		
Episode 449: Nasty Lyrics	10/10/16	Paul F. Tompkins; Drew Tarver as Trish Trasch; Ryan Gaul as Beverly Gunt; Mandell Maughan as Janice Bullhorn; Dan Ahdoot as Juan		
Episode 450: Throw It On the Floor	10/13/16	Kyle Kinane; Horatio Sanz as Dr. Julius Jackson		
Episode 451: Wishing with The Grawlix	10/17/16	Ben Roy; Andrew Orvedahl; Lauren Lapkus as Frank Dorito; Brendon Small as Victor Diamond, Tiny, and Willard "Willy" Mapleton; Paul F. Tompkins as Jarles		
Episode 452: Pow! Pow! Power Wheels!	10/24/16	"Weird Al" Yankovic; Claudia O'Doherty; Jessica McKenna as Beth		
Episode 453: Unblocked and Unlocked	10/27/16	Johnny Pemberton as himself and Dicker Troy; Eden Sher; Londale Theus Jr. as Reverend T.P. Stain	Games: Would You Rather?	
Episode 454: Return to Suicide House Part Tricks-or-Treats	10/31/16	Jon Daly as Beuford le Barron; Allan McLeod as Ghost Boy; Paul Rust as Dr. Traygo; Nick Wiger as Leo Carpazzi; Caroline Anderson as Scaroline	Games: Hallowscream Freestyle Rap Contest	
Episode 455: The Washington Monugents Reunite	11/3/16	Bob Odenkirk; River Butcher; Tim Kalpakis; Dave Ferguson; Mike Hanford; Eban Schletter		
Episode 456: The Historic Rap	11/7/16	Jason Mantzoukas; Paul F. Tompkins as Cal Solomon		
Episode 457: Prepare for the Quake	11/14/16	Michael Showalter; Paul Brittain as Dr. Brian Blouse; Jeremy Rowley as Mark		
Episode 458: Solo Bolo Cuatrolo	11/17/16	Ben Schwartz; Lin-Manuel Miranda calls in	Games: Solo Bolo Olympic Song Challenge	
Episode 459: Giamatti Gives Thanks	11/21/16	Maria Thayer; James Adomian as Paul Giamatti; Tawny Newsome as Gary Urbansky		
Episode 460: Persons of Interest	11/28/16	"Weird Al" Yankovic; Ryan Gaul as Detective James P. Garetty; Jeremy Rowley as Kole Kringle; Drew Tarver as David		
Episode 461: Tragedy Boom! Boom! with The Magic Tavern	12/1/16	Adal Rifai as Chunt, King of the Badgers; Arnie Niekamp; Matt Young as Usidore the Blue	Games: Honesty or Challenge	
Episode 462: Breakin' Since the 30s	12/5/16	Nick Thune; Moshe Kasher; Lauren Lapkus as Wendy Quote The Worm Unquote Widelman and The Dell Guy		
Episode 463: 2016 Holiday Spectacular	12/12/16	Jason Mantzoukas; Jon Gabrus as Gino Lombardo; Mike Hanford as John Lennon; Paul F. Tompkins as Al A. Peterson; Tawny Newsome as Gary Urbansky; Tim Baltz as Ron Urbansky; Neil Campbell as The Time Keeper; River Butcher; Will Hines as Frosty the Snowman; Ryan Gaul as Norm Hamer; Jeremy Rowley as Ming; Drew Tarver as Keith Jones; James Adomian as Jesse Ventura; Zeke Nicholson as Dr. Green; Brendon Small as Victor Diamond, Tiny, and Willy Mapleton		
Best of 2016 Pt. 1	12/19/16	Paul F. Tompkins	15. Benny Shwaz and Ted Ronson (Episode 393: Peanuts Awareness); 14. Droppin’ Deuces and Pizza Raps (Episode 456: The Historic Rap); 13. Rapping Beth and Text Death (Episode 452: Pow! Pow! Power Wheels!); 4. Gil, George, and Pamela from Big Bear (Live Episode: Just For Laughs in Montreal); 12. Catching up with Hot Dog (Episode 400: The War on Surfing)	
Best of 2016 Pt. 2	12/22/16	Paul F. Tompkins	11. New No-Nos and Theme Songs (Episode 401: LOVE Is Thicker Than Water); 10. D.A.B.D.A. (Episode 423: Time Bobby 4); 9. Another Olympic Song Challenge (Episode 402: Solo Bolo Trolo); 3. Claudia O'Doherty and Calvin Redding (Live Episode: Sydney, NSW, Australia); 8. Exposing R. Schrift (Episode 425: Sunday Afternoon Taped)	"Please Don't Joke About 'I, Robot' This Christmas" by Scott Aukerman and Paul F. Tompkins
Best of 2016 Pt. 3	12/26/16	Paul F. Tompkins	7. You Know What? (Episode 390: The Oh, Hello Show); 2. Kid Detectives 2.5 (Live Episode: Live from Comic-Con); 6. Broken Feet and Janice Cramps (Episode 446: Scrounging and Lounging); 5. Amateur Barrister Sex Parties (Episode 429: Almost Mandatory); 4. The Time Keeper's Rap (Episode 419: The 7th Anniversary Show!)	
Best of 2016 Pt. 4	12/29/16	Paul F. Tompkins	3. Everyone but David Bunting (Episode 391: 2015 Holiday Spectacular); BONUS: The Apple Tree Song (Episode 418: Paul Reiser and The Apple Tree); 2. Turd Dunkweed (Episode 416: Silicone Bralley Poo Crew); 1. Ho Ho, The Contraptionaire, and Donny Gary (Live Episode: Atlanta, The Tabernacle); 1. Two Words! We Gotta Go to Alaska! (Episode 406: Kid Detectives II)	"Olympic Song Challenge Remix" by Scott Aukerman and Ben Schwartz (featuring Lin-Manuel Miranda)

=== 2017 ===
Episode number	Date	Guests	Synopsis and segments	Featured songs
Episode 464: A Ton More Sexy	1/4/17	Ben Schwartz; Horatio Sanz as Shelly Driftwood and Gringo Starr		
Episode 465: Harsh Joe Pinions	1/9/17	Matt Besser; Jessica McKenna as Margery Kershaw; Gil Ozeri as Joe "Pinions" Rudolph		
Episode 466: Gossip Guy	1/16/17	Brendon Walsh as himself and Rene Faberge; Randy Liedtke; Lauren Lapkus as Traci Reardon and Ross Geller		
Episode 467: TruLife TV	1/23/17	Paul Scheer as himself and Tyren Bigsby; Michelle Biloon; Mike O'Brien as Kelly Burton		
Episode 468: The Dream Method	1/30/17	Rachel Bloom; Jeremy Rowley as Ming; Anthony Atamanuik as Chief Inspector Yoplait and Ringo Starr; Mike Hanford as Peter Finn		
Episode 469: Quiznos What QuizDid	2/6/17	John Hodgman; Zeke Nicholson as Dr. Green; Carl Tart as The Chief		
Episode 470: Electric Guest Are Masculine	2/13/17	Electric Guest; Mary Holland as Brandon Potter; Erin Whitehead as Janelle Jinx		"Glorious Warrior" by Electric Guest "Dear To Me" by Electric Guest
Episode 471: Shy By Nature, Outgoing By Nurture	2/20/17	Jason Mantzoukas; John Early as Tricia R. Kate Berlant as Tricia L.		
Episode 472: Pleats, Please!	2/23/17	Kurt Braunohler; Will Hines as Johnny Bikes; Holly Prazoff as Susan Greenberg		
Episode 473: Tight Tort	2/27/17	Ben Schwartz as himself and Markis Quiddlebit; Thomas Middleditch as himself and Alan Buchanan		
Episode 474: Liquid Meal Spheres	3/6/17	Gillian Jacobs; Paul Rust; Paul F. Tompkins as Big Chunky Bubbles	Games: New No-Nos, Comedy Bang Bang Dating Game	
Episode 475: Prince and John Popper	3/13/17	Andy Daly as August Lindt; Jon Gabrus as Gino Lombardo		
Episode 476: The Evigan Way	3/20/17	Ryan Gaul as Dr. Martinia Johansson; Heidi Gardner as Tracy Evigan; Jordan Black as Toluca Graves		
Episode 477: Two Fingers Wide	3/23/17	American Football; Mike Hanford as John Lennon; Mary Holland as Gwendolyn Speck; Tim Baltz as Jonathan Woodley		"I've Been So Lost For So Long" by American Football "Home Is Where The Haunt Is" by American Football "Everyone Is Dressed Up" by American Football
Episode 478: Spank Me With A Feather!	3/27/17	Kristian Bruun; Tatiana Maslany; Paul F. Tompkins as Chazmin; Lauren Lapkus as Sunny; Mary Holland as Janice Cramps		
Episode 479: The Bunn Process	4/3/17	Gerry Duggan; Paul Brittain as Richard Bunn; Kirby Howell-Baptiste as Angeylinaaa		
Episode 480: Tooth of the Sea	4/6/17	Jane Lynch; Kate Mines; Paul Witten; Drew Tarver as Curtis Korn; Madeline Walter as Wanda Dumps		
Episode 481: Silly Con Valley Poo Crew 3	4/10/17	Thomas Middleditch as himself and Don Donaldson; Kumail Nanjiani; Martin Starr		
Episode 482: Streahemoth	4/17/17	Joel Hodgson; Baron Vaughn; Jonah Ray; Horatio Sanz as Johnny "Delta" Johnson; Alison Rich as Inés Blarfi		
Episode 483: The 420 Show	4/20/17	Neil Campbell as The Time Keeper; Zeke Nicholson as Dr. Green; Matt Besser as Colin Ramsey	Games: Would You Rather?	
Episode 484: Pre Chowder	4/24/17	Jason Mantzoukas; Jon Gabrus as Gino Lombardo; Paul F. Tompkins as Lord Andrew Lloyd Webber	Games: Would You Rather?	
Episode 485: The 8th Anniversary Show!	5/1/17	Jon Gabrus as Gino Lombardo; Paul F. Tompkins as Cake Boss, Garry Marshall and Alan Thicke; Lauren Lapkus as Regina Crimp and P'Nut; Zeke Nicholson as Bone Queef; Carl Tart as The Chief; Mary Holland as Chucky Spliff; Mike Hanford as John Lennon; Jessica McKenna as Dagmar the Small; Tawny Newsome as Rauro Riley; Tim Baltz as Burt Riley; Ryan Gaul as Norm Hamer; Drew Tarver as Keith Jones; Jeremy Rowley as Ming; Nick Kroll as R. Schrift		
Episode 486: Schwimm On In	5/8/17	Ron Funches; Nick Thune; Jon Daly as Papa Johns Misty; Jordan Black as Vernita Wyatt	Games: Would You Rather?	
Episode 487: Genie Awareness	5/15/17	Haley Joel Osment; Ryan Gaul as Doug Gropes; Lauren Lapkus as Bunty Pickles; Shaun Diston as Carl Smart		
Episode 488: 3 Kidnapped Boys	5/22/17	Al Madrigal; Alana Johnston as Cam Paxton; Alison Rich as Brian Credit; Natalie Palamides as Billy Neville	Games: Would You Rather?	
Episode 489: The Bajillion Dollar Propertie$ Elevator Pitch	5/29/17	Kulap Vilaysack as herself and Gishel Bergentrack; Paul F. Tompkins as himself and Orph Bergentrack; Tim Baltz as himself and Jackenzie Bergentrack; Dan Ahdoot as himself and Gobo Bergentrack; Drew Tarver as himself and Trey Bergentrack; Eugene Cordero as himself and D'artagnan Bergentrack; Mandell Maughan as herself and Mackenzie Bergentrack; Tawny Newsome as herself and Kim Bega		
Episode 490: Coma Pants	6/5/17	Lucia Aniello; Paul W. Downs; Zeke Nicholson as Pants the Rapper; Carl Tart as MC Sugar Butt; Lamar Woods as Carl Coaster		
Episode 491: Goo It	6/12/17	Rory Scovel; Mike Hanford as Justin Hoffman; D'Arcy Carden as Caroline BelindaCarlisle		
Episode 492: Dashiki Fever	6/19/17	Jessica St. Clair as Marissa Wompler; Lennon Parham as Miss Listler		
Episode 493: King Garbage Dick	6/22/17	Nick Kroll; Anthony King as Liberty DeVito; Seth Morris as Josh Yadegar		
Episode 494: Face Fox	6/26/17	Jon Hamm; Edgar Wright; Paul F. Tompkins as J.W. Stillwater; Jessica McKenna as Beth		
Episode 495: Who CBBeefed?	6/29/17	Jason Mantzoukas; Mary Holland as Jennifer Spot; Tim Baltz as Jason Turley		
Episode 496: The Dream Lords	7/3/17	Andrea Savage; Jon Gabrus as Gino Lombardo; Will Hines as Morpheus, The Dream Lord; Holly Prazoff as Mary Lisa		
Episode 497: Wait Awhile	7/10/17	Kumail Nanjiani; Emily V. Gordon; Horatio Sanz as Cooper F. Worthington-Tompkins; Eliza Skinner as Lindsey Cumdrop		
Episode 498: What That DOS	7/13/17	Flula Borg; Jeremy Rowley as Ming; Brendon Small as Willard "Willy" Mapleton and Captain Mustache; Paul F. Tompkins as Jarles		
Episode 499: The Freak	7/17/17	Kyle Mooney as himself and Chris Fitzpatrick; Paul Rust as Benny Bachelor; Neil Campbell as Barrett Bachelor; Fran Gillespie as Rosie Jipps		
Episode 500: The 500th Episode	7/24/17	Nick Kroll as El Chupacabra; Jason Mantzoukas; Lauren Lapkus as Todd; Jon Gabrus as Gino Lombardo; Paul F. Tompkins as Cal Solomon; Mary Holland as Tommy Scuzz		
Episode 501: Manchester Orchestra's Kith and Kin	7/31/17	Manchester Orchestra (Andy Hull and Robert McDowell); Jessica McKenna as Sissy Montgomery; Zach Reino as Lord Dingle		"The Gold" by Manchester Orchestra "The Alien" by Manchester Orchestra
Episode 502: Error 502	8/7/17	Joe Mande; James Adomian as Jesse Ventura and Falkor; Will Hines as Morpheus		
Episode 503: Reese's Feces	8/14/17	Andy Richter; Alison Rich as Tina Danish; John Gemberling as Patricia Primm		
Episode 504: The Bigger the Percent the Better	8/17/17	Brett Gelman		
Episode 505: Grass-Fed Bits	8/21/17	David Wain; Dan Wilson; Jordan Black as Testarossa Manigault; Tim Baltz as Randy Snutz		"When the Stars Come Out" by Dan Wilson "Someone Like You" by Dan Wilson "Closing Time" by Dan Wilson
Episode 506: Hot Tub Diarrhea	8/28/17	Chris Gethard; Mike Hanford as John Lennon; Madeline Walter as Pam Carton		
Episode 507: Popcorn Costume	9/4/17	Cameron Esposito; River Butcher; Paul F. Tompkins as Mike the Janitor; Tawny Newsome as Gary Urbansky		
Episode 508: Beach Cheese	9/11/17	Nathan Fielder; Betsy Sodaro as Cherry the C.H.U.D. Will Hines as Bones McGrill		
Episode 509: 3 Witches and a Baby	9/18/17	Tig Notaro; Lauren Lapkus as Dump Dump; Mary Holland as Frida Corpse; Erin Whitehead as Girdle		
Episode 510: Pound Foolish	9/25/17	Andy Samberg; Paul F. Tompkins as Mayor Junius Bobbledoonary; Drew Tarver as Derek Contrera		
Episode 511: Morzouksnick Interruption	10/2/17	Nick Kroll; Jason Mantzoukas; Seth Morris as Bob Ducca		
Episode 512: What's Your AIM?	10/9/17	Bobby Moynihan as Slow Pesci and Fourvel; Paul F. Tompkins as Werner Herzog		
Episode 513: Hobo Code	10/12/17	Patton Oswalt; Drew Tarver as Randy Travels; Betsy Sodaro as Charlotte		
Episode 514: The Calvins Twins Return	10/16/17	Taran Killam as Bever Hopox; Paul Brittain as Chico Hands; Ryan Gaul as Bisby St. Hancock		
Episode 515: Return to Suicide House Part 666	10/23/17	Brett Gelman as Messmore LeBaron; Jon Daly as Bueford LeBaron; Allan McLeod as Ghost Boy; Natalie Palamides as Ghost Mother; Nick Wiger as Leo Carpazzi; Caroline Anderson as Scaroline	Games: Hallowscream Freestyle Rap Competition	
Episode 516: Solo Bolo Cincolo	10/26/17	Ben Schwartz	Games: Solo Bolo Olympic Song Challenge	
Episode 517: Aha Moments with The National	10/30/17	The National; Brendon Small as Victor Diamond and Tiny; Jessica McKenna as Dagmar the Small		"Walk It Back" by The National "Guilty Party" by The National "Carin at the Liquor Store" by The National
Episode 518: Corn Dog Horndog	11/6/17	Jason Mantzoukas; Andy Daly as Cameron McGonigle		
Episode 519: Law O Ver Everything	11/13/17	John Early; Carl Tart as The Chief; Zeke Nicholson as Bone Queef		
Episode 520: Dead Body Rap	11/16/17	Rob Huebel; Will Hines as Joe Squib; Alana Johnston as Chandeline Jean		
Episode 521: Bing Bong Goodbye	11/20/17	John Hodgman; Jon Gabrus as Gino Lombardo; Lauren Lapkus as Todd; D'Arcy Carden as Caroline BelindaCarlisle		
Episode 522: Charlie's Bucket List	11/27/17	Sarah Silverman; Madeline Walter as Charles Manson; Ego Nwodim as Prince Chinedu; Paul F. Tompkins as Jarles		
Episode 523: Chekhov's Phone	12/4/17	Jimmy Pardo; Drew Tarver as Jake; Ryan Rosenberg as David; Jon Mackey as Lou; Dan Lippert as Carl	Games: Charades By Proxy	
Episode 524: Merry Chunky Christmas with Neil Patrick Harris	12/11/17	Neil Patrick Harris; Paul F. Tompkins as Big Chunky Bubbles; Shaun Diston as Rudi North		
Episode 525: 2017 Holiday Spectacular	12/18/17	Mister Heavenly; Jason Mantzoukas; Lauren Lapkus as Ho Ho; Jon Gabrus as Gino Lombardo; Mike Hanford as John Lennon; Paul F. Tompkins as Mayor Junius Bobbledoonary and Old Woman; James Adomian as Chris Matthews; Carl Tart as MC Sugar Butt; Tawny Newsome as Gary Urbansky; Drew Tarver as Keith Jones; Jeremy Rowley as Ming; Neil Campbell as Ernie Bread		"Makin' Excuses" by Mister Heavenly "Beat Down" by Mister Heavenly "Blue Lines" by Mister Heavenly "Hammer Drop" by Mister Heavenly
Best of 2017 Pt. 1 - Nagada: A Star Wars Story	12/25/17	Paul F. Tompkins	16. New No-Nos and Big Chunky Bubbles (Episode 474: Liquid Meal Spheres); 15. The Chief's Debut (Episode 469: Quiznos What Quiz Did); 14. The Bergentrack Family Familial Band (Episode 489: The Bajillion Dollar Propertie$ Elevator Pitch); 13. Buchanan and Quiddlebit (Episode 473: Tight Tort)	"Please Don't Joke About 'I, Tonya' This Christmas" by Scott Aukerman and Paul F. Tompkins
Best of 2017 Pt. 2	12/28/17	Paul F. Tompkins	12. CG Me Eyes (Episode 521: Bing Bong Goodbye); 11. The Horse-Off (Episode 514: The Calvins Twins Return); 10. Ghost Tours (Episode 518: Corn Dog Horndog); 9. Meeting the Mayor (Episode 510: Pound Foolish)	"Freestyle Rap Remix" by Ben Schwartz and Scott Aukerman

=== 2018 ===
Episode number	Date	Guests	Synopsis and segments	Featured songs
Best of 2017 Pt. 3	1/1/18	Paul F. Tompkins	8. Chazmin and Sunny Return (Episode 478: Spank Me With A Feather!); 7. Don & Dong (Episode 481: Silly Con Valley Poo Crew 3); 6. Slow Pesci (Episode 512: What's Your AIM?); 5. Scott's Breakfast Bukkake (Episode 484: Pre Chowder)	"The Monster Fuck Part 6 (Scary Love)" by Nick Wiger and Caroline Anderson
Best of 2017 Pt. 4	1/4/18	Paul F. Tompkins	4. The Return of Bob Ducca (Episode 511: Morzouksnick Interruption); 3. The Smooth Criminal, The Time Keeper, and The Hammer Nissan Holiday Naughty Or Nice Nissan Sentra Car Giveaway Contest (Episode 463: 2016 Holiday Spectacular); 2. Garry Marshall, Bone Chief, and Chucky Spliff (Episode 485: The 8th Anniversary Show!); 1. Breaking Off Another Hundo (Episode 500: The 500th Episode)	"Olympic Song Challenge Remix" by Scott Aukerman and Ben Schwartz
Episode 526: Air Lift Me Out	1/8/18	Ben Schwartz; Horatio Sanz as himself and Shelly Driftwood		
Episode 527: Hootie Hoo	1/15/18	Ego Nwodim as Dorothy Charlessss; Shaun Diston as Leo Williams; Alison Rich as Will Crowe		
Episode 528: This Is The Story of My Life	1/22/18	Natasha Leggero; Riki Lindhome; Zeke Nicholson as Kiwi Kris; Drew Tarver as Josh Fox	Games: Would You Rather?	
Episode 529: Am I The What?	1/29/18	Patton Oswalt; Andy Daly as Dalton Wilcox; Mary Sohn as Pam Tran		
Episode 530: Zoom Zoom	2/5/18	Whitney Cummings; Jessica McKenna as Barry Big; Marques Ray as Danny Trejo Jr.		
Episode 531: Atmosphere Bully	2/12/18	Todd Glass; James Adomian as Winston Churchill; Nicole Byer as Becky		
Episode 532: Everything is Horrible and Wonderful	2/19/18	Stephanie Wittels Wachs; Will Hines as Morpheus the Dream Lord; Paul F. Tompkins as Brock Lovett; Tawny Newsome as The Rum Tum Tugger		
Episode 533: Is That Chocolate, Or What?	2/26/18	"Weird Al" Yankovic; Mary Holland as Debbie Creepy; Mano Agapion as Jergen Tavikya	Games: Would You Rather?	
Episode 534: Solid As A Rock	3/5/18	Paul Rust; Claudia O'Doherty; Carl Tart as Bashford; Ego Nwodim as Franklin	Games: Would You Rather?	
Episode 535: Niles Per Hour	3/12/18	Peter Serafinowicz; Griffin Newman; Shaun Diston as Rudi North; Natalie Palamides as Shaliyah; Courtney Pauroso as Conchneee		
Episode 536: Live from SXSW 2018	3/15/18	Tatiana Maslany; Jon Gabrus as Gino Lombardo; Lauren Lapkus as Todd; Paul Scheer as Scott Jeffries; James Adomian as Sebastian Gorka		
Episode 537: Silly Cone Valley Poo Crew Minus One	3/19/18	Thomas Middleditch as himself, Janine Blackwell, and Kumail Nanjiani; Martin Starr		
Episode 538: Ro...ller Co...aster O...ne	3/26/18	Chelsea Peretti; Matt Besser as Mick 4D; Dhruv Uday Singh as Samir Chakraborty		
Episode 539: The Pointing Sisters	4/2/18	Adam Cayton-Holland; Neil Campbell as Larry the Loner; D'Arcy Carden as Dino & Shame		
Episode 540: Low Five	4/9/18	Jon Hamm; Paul F. Tompkins as Al A. Peterson; Jessica McKenna as Margery Kershaw; Zach Reino as Dash Grabum		
Episode 541: Is That A Joke?	4/16/18	Thomas Middleditch as himself, Mitch Slocum, and Slippy Daniels; Ben Schwartz as himself, Leonard Stooltap, and Jack Pot		
Episode 542: Big Ben Minus Ten	4/23/18	Phoebe Robinson; Madeline Walter as Mary Berry; Ronnie Adrian as Bertrand "Sweet Sauce" Gilmore		
Episode 543: The 9th Anniversary Show!	4/30/18	Sean Clements; Hayes Davenport; Lauren Lapkus as Dirk Thirsty; Paul F. Tompkins as Emily Grandchildren; Shaun Diston as Rudi North; Zeke Nicholson as Kiwi Kris; Ego Nwodim as Entrée PeeE Neur; Madeline Walter as Charles Manson		
Episode 544: On Script	5/7/18	Michael Ian Black; Nick Thune; Zac Oyama as Kenny Takahashi; Holly Prazoff as Melissa		
Episode 545: Casual High Technology with Wajatta	5/14/18	Reggie Watts; John Tejada; Jeremy Rowley as Ming; Alison Rich as Margarite Shoes		"Let Me Come To Your Party" by Wajatta "Get Down (with Ya Bad Self)" by Wajatta "Je Wa Soto" by Wajatta "Runnin'" by Wajatta
Episode 546: 69 Show Pitches	5/17/18	Sean Clements; Hayes Davenport		
Episode 547: Johnny Pacquiao	5/21/18	John Mulaney; Seth Morris as Clovis Mandrake; Betsy Sodaro as Mrs. Potts		
Episode 548: Know What I'm Saying?	5/28/18	Gillian Jacobs; Paul F. Tompkins as Lavinia Marsh Caruthers; Lamar Woods as Carmine; Tawny Newsome as eDream Vignette		
Episode 549: Prom Womptacular	6/4/18	Jessica St. Clair as Marissa Wompler; Lennon Parham as Charlotte Listler; Brian Huskey as Dr. Seth Wompler and Vance H. Paul Scheer as C.S. Steers	NOTE: also featuring Scott Aukerman as Dabney Coleperson	
Episode 550: Cheesing Out the Wave D-Hole	6/11/18	Jason Mantzoukas; Andy Daly as Hot Dog		
Episode 551: New to the Wax with The Sloppy Boys	6/18/18	Jon Gabrus as Gino Lombardo; Mike Hanford as himself and John Lennon; Tim Kalpakis; Jefferson Dutton; Shaun Diston as Devin O'Shea		"Here for the Beer" by The Sloppy Boys "I'm One Hell of a Dude" by The Sloppy Boys "Hee Hee Hee" by The Sloppy Boys
Episode 552: Hey, Keep Readin'	6/25/18	"Weird Al" Yankovic; Ryan Gaul as Dr. Peter Fash; Edi Patterson as Bean Dip		
Episode 553: Let's Write on the White	7/2/18	Lakeith Stanfield; Ego Nwodim as Darlington Cassel/Meryl Stanfield; Mary Sohn as Nancy Yi and Bob Cat		
Episode 554: Educainment Squad	7/9/18	Horatio Sanz as himself, Peppers McGilly, and Big One; Thomas Middleditch as Lyle Cummings		
Episode 555: What A Wonderful WaterWorld	7/16/18	Cameron Esposito; Paul F. Tompkins as JW Stillwater; Matt Gourley as Cal Buckley/Professor Stillwater		
Episode 556: Tips 'n' Tricks	7/23/18	Kristian Bruun; John Gemberling as Erupt; Gil Ozeri as Sweatch; Zeke Nicholson as Raul DeLaMancha		
Episode 557: Word Down	7/23/18	Carl Tart as Larry Blackmon; Madeline Walter as Nance		
Episode 558: Ship of Love	7/29/18	Casey Wilson; Drew Tarver as Martin Sheffield Lickly; Zac Oyama as Chase Varner	Games: Would You Rather?	
Episode 559: Jen and Berry's Frozen Ice	8/6/18	Bobby Moynihan as Jen; Eugene Cordero as Berry		
Episode 560: 1-800 Jingles	8/13/18	Ben Schwartz; Jessica McKenna as Phil Shorts; Will Hines as Hypnoto the Mesmerist and Morpheus the Dream Lord		
Episode 561: Poke Mitzvah	8/20/18	Andy Richter; Zach Reino as Dash Grabum; Tawny Newsome as Hekla Jonsdottir		
Episode 562: They'ven't Yet	8/27/18	Max Silvestri; Matt Besser as Daniel Faraway; Joe Wengert as Roman D'O'Grots	Games: Would You Rather?	
Episode 563: Where You Come From with CHVRCHES	9/2/18	CHVRCHES; Edi Patterson as Bean Dip; Holly Prazoff as Mary Lisa		"Miracle" by CHVRCHES "Graffiti" by CHVRCHES
Episode 564: Svelte Scale	9/10/18	Zach Galifianakis; Andy Daly as Byron Denniston; Nicole Parker as Celine Dion		
Episode 565: C'mon Bake Bake	9/17/18	Jason Mantzoukas; Mary Holland as Eugenia Wobbles; D'Arcy Carden as Augie Augerman		
Episode 566: The Calvins Triplets	9/24/18	Taran Killam as Bever Hopox and Marinka Oligarch; Paul Brittain as Chico Hands; Ryan Gaul as Bisby St. Hancock		
Episode 567: Midnight Junket	10/1/18	Lennon Parham as Forsythia; Nick Kroll as Sergei, himself, and Timmy; Gil Ozeri as Bane		
Episode 568: Literal Web	10/8/18	Ike Barinholtz; Dhruv Uday Singh as Lin-Manuel Miranda; Mary Sohn as Nadine Funts		
Episode 569: Dull Knives Sturdy Eyes	10/15/18	Emily Heller; Drew Tarver as Matthew; Dan Lippert as Luke; Ryan Rosenberg as Chris; Jon Mackey as Billy	Games: Would You Rather?	
Episode 570: The Dirty 27	10/22/18	David Wain; Thomas Middleditch as himself and Brody Broderson; Shaun Diston as Rudi North		
Episode 571: Rope Beats Rock	10/29/18	Jon Gabrus as Gino Lombardo; Betsy Sodaro as Queen Cleopatra; Will Hines as Idaho		
Episode 572: Changerous	11/5/18	Jason Mantzoukas; Paul F. Tompkins as Buttonwillow McKittrick		
Episode 573: Alfred Molina Flair	11/12/18	Adam Cayton-Holland; Alana Johnston as Diane Templeton; Ben Rodgers as Jack Furz	Games: Would You Rather?	
Episode 574: Conan Never Goes Outside	11/19/18	Conan O'Brien; Paul F. Tompkins as Pat Hamptoncrat; Lauren Lapkus as Scat Hamptoncrat; Mary Holland as Prudence Farth		
Episode 575: That Dazzles Me Already	11/26/18	Don't Stop or We'll Die (Paul Rust, Michael Cassady); Mike Hanford as John Lennon; Zac Oyama as Keantwo Reeves		"That's Right I'm Five" by Don't Stop or We'll Die "Lily Pad On Your Doorstep" by Don't Stop or We'll Die "Taco Night"/"Waving Through A Window" by Don't Stop or We'll Die & Scott Aukerman
Episode 576: What the Sound Made	12/3/18	Andy Daly as Joe Bongo; Tim Baltz as Randy Snutz		
Episode 577: Miss-pered	12/10/18	Flula Borg; Shaun Diston as Sprague the Whisperer; Lily Sullivan as Kayla Dickie		
Episode 578: Right Off The Batman	12/13/18	Paul F. Tompkins as Cal Solomon; Bobby Moynihan as Batman		
Episode 579: 2018 Holiday Spectacular	12/17/18	Jason Mantzoukas; Jon Gabrus as Gino Lombardo; Paul F. Tompkins as Santa Claus; Lauren Lapkus as Big Sue Claus; Shaun Diston as Rudi North; Zeke Nicholson as Peter Griffin; Jessica McKenna as Beth and Killiam; Mike Hanford as John Lennon; Will Hines as Morpheus, The Dream Lord; Ryan Gaul as Deanas Croc; Tim Baltz as Daenas Croc; Thomas Middleditch as Big Dog; Nick Wiger as Leo Carpazzi		
Best of 2018 Pt. 1	12/24/18	Paul F. Tompkins	14. The Songs of Martin Sheffield Lickly (Episode 558: Ship of Love); 13. Brock Lovett, Treasure Hunter (Episode 532: Everything is Horrible and Wonderful); 12. Eugenia Wobbles (Episode 565: C'mon Bake Bake); 11. Debut of a Fan Favorite (Episode 524: Merry Chunky Christmas with Neil Patrick Harris)	"Blue Lines" by Mister Heavenly
Best of 2018 Pt. 2	12/27/18	Paul F. Tompkins	10. Bever, Chico, and Bisby (Episode 566: The Calvins Triplets); 9. Godfather vs. Queen (Episode 572: Changerous); 8. Stooltap and Slocum (Episode 541: Is That A Joke?); 7. Conan and the Hamptoncrats (Episode 574: Conan Never Goes Outside)	
Best of 2018 Pt. 3	12/31/18	Paul F. Tompkins	6. What's Up, Hot Dog? (Episode 550: Cheesing Out the Wave D-Hole); 5. Calling the Superintendent (Episode 554: Educainment Squad); 4. Gotta Catch 'Em All! (Episode 540: Low Five)	

=== 2019 ===
Episode number	Date	Guests	Synopsis and segments	Featured songs
Best of 2018 Pt. 4	1/03/19	Paul F. Tompkins	3. New No-No's and Bashford & Franklin (Episode 534: Solid As A Rock); 2. A Fan Favorite is Back and Entrée PeeE Neur (Episode 543: The 9th Anniversary Show!); 1. Mayor Bobbledoonary and Chris Matthews (Episode 525: 2017 Holiday Spectacular)	
Episode 580: Legend of Mr. Met	1/7/19	Ben Schwartz; Horatio Sanz as himself, Johnny Salese, and Chris Grezlik	Games: Riddle Me This	
Episode 581: Thickest Oompa Loompa	1/14/19	Matt Ingebretson; Jake Weisman; Ego Nwodim as Willamina Wonka; Mary Scheer as Doreen Blachly	Games: Would You Rather?	
Episode 582: Practice Sacks	1/17/19	Sam Richardson; Joe Wengert as Coach Joel GanVundi; Mary Sohn as Deb		
Episode 583: Batman Nine-Nine	1/21/19	Chelsea Peretti; Drew Tarver as Martin Sheffield Lickly; John Gemberling as Chitter Chitter Cluck Click		
Episode 584: Weirdamony Alimony Tony	1/28/19	John Hodgman; Paul F. Tompkins as Alimony Tony; Will Hines as Rupert Sharp		
Episode 585: Lemons is the New Black	2/4/19	Matt Walsh; Lauren Lapkus as Traci Reardon; Dhruv Uday Singh as Allen Woody, Louis C.K., and Roman Polanski	Games: Riddle Me This	
Episode 586: Butt First	2/11/19	River Butcher; Colton Dunn as Devon Westinghouse; Ryan Gaul as James P. Garity	Games: Would You Rather?	
Episode 587: No Relation	2/18/19	Maya Erskine; Anna Konkle; Dan Lippert as Seth Berkowitz; Ronnie Adrian as Perry Gordon		
Episode 588: Lil' Choices	2/25/19	Jason Mantzoukas; Thomas Middleditch as Kaitlin		
Episode 589: Werewolfwithal	3/4/19	Patton Oswalt; Andy Daly as Dalton Wilcox		
Episode 590: Bread Mop	3/11/19	Andrea Savage; Matt Besser as Jackson Maine; Madeline Walter as Linda Watermark		
Episode 591: UnbeWiebebeble: Kayla Dickie Returns	3/14/19	Flula Borg; Shaun Diston as Sprague the Whisperer; Lily Sullivan as Kayla Dickie; Tim Baltz as Jud Wiebe		
Episode 592: The PeeE Neurs	3/18/19	Langston Kerman; Ego Nwodim as Entrée PeeE Neur; Carl Tart as Appetizer PeeE Neur; Paul F. Tompkins as Jarles		
Episode 593: Get In The Way Gremlin	3/25/19	Natalie Morales; Jessica McKenna as Get In The Way Gremlin; Zeke Nicholson as Peter Griffin		
Episode 594: Now It's Time For A Breakdown	3/28/19	Dan Mangan; Will Hines as Randy Useless; Jon Mackey as Jimmy-Bug Brickhouse		"Peaks & Valleys" by Dan Mangan "Troubled Mind" by Dan Mangan "Cold in the Summer" by Dan Mangan
Episode 595: Mother's Olive Oil	4/1/19	Demi Adejuyigbe; Carl Tart as The Chief and Cleveland Columbus; Alyssa Limperis as Mother		
Episode 596: Mr. Met and the Legitimate Witch	4/8/19	Griffin Newman; Paul F. Tompkins as Mr. Met; Alison Rich as Mathilda Primble		
Episode 597: Simpson and Smith: Selling Stories	4/15/19	Baron Vaughn; Zac Oyama as Denny Simpson; Ify Nwadiwe as Gregory Smith	Games: Would You Rather?	
Episode 598: Secret Shopping with Mötley Crüe	4/22/19	Tim Robinson; Ryan Rosenberg as The Super Secret Shopper; Natalie Palamides as Nikki Sixx; Courtney Pauroso as Nikki Seven	Games: Would You Rather?	
Episode 599: 10th Anniversary Part 1	4/29/19	Jason Mantzoukas; Andy Daly as Hot Dog and Dalton Wilcox; Paul F. Tompkins as Lord Andrew Lloyd Webber; Seth Morris as Bob Ducca; Jon Hamm; Lauren Lapkus as Todd; Jessica McKenna as Beth; Zach Reino as Dash Grabum; Jon Gabrus as Gino Lombardo; Ego Nwodim as Entrée PeeE Neur and Prince Chinedu; Zeke Nicholson as Bone Queef and Kiwi Kris; Carl Tart as MC Sugar Butt and The Chief; Rob Huebel; Thomas Lennon as himself and Little Gary; Matt Besser as Björk; Paul Scheer as Chip Garvey; Tawny Newsome as Gary Urbansky and Rum Tum Tugger; Madeline Walter as Charles Manson; Taran Killam as Bever Hopox; Paul Brittain as Chico Hands; Ryan Gaul as Bisby St. Hancock and Jisby		
Episode 599.5: 10th Anniversary Part 2	4/29/19	Thomas Middleditch as Joey Tortellini; Adam Scott; Chelsea Peretti; Nick Kroll as Fabrice Fabrice; Drew Tarver as Martin Sheffield Lickly "Weird Al" Yankovic; Paul Rust as himself and Mama Bread; Neil Campbell as Ernie Bread and Mr. Bread; Bobby Moynihan as Fourvel and Batman; Mary Holland as Eugenia Wobbles; Horatio Sanz; Ben Schwartz; Jon Daly as Mall McCartney; Shaun Diston as Rudi North and Judy North; Mike Hanford as John Lennon; Will Hines as Randy Useless; Brendon Small as Captain Mustache; Jessica St. Clair as Marissa Wompler calls in Lennon Parham as Charlotte Listler calls in James Adomian as Jesse Ventura and Huell Howser	Games: New No-Nos	
Episode 600: Patrick McMahon Returns: A Story About Johnny McGory	5/6/19	Jason Mantzoukas; Andy Daly as Patrick McMahon	Games: Would You Rather?	
Episode 601: 20th Anniversary Special	5/13/19	Kulap Vilaysack; Lily Sullivan as Becky; Ryan Gaul as Randy H. Over		
Episode 602: Four...Dollars Hundred	5/20/19	David Cross; Will Hines as Louis Green; Ele Woods as Dina Dennis		
Episode 603: Fastidious Makeover with The Sloppy Boys	5/27/19	Mike Hanford as himself, John Lennon, and Ralph Slodge; Tim Kalpakis as himself and Dr. Olivia Slodge; Jefferson Dutton; Neil Campbell as Mr. Fastidious/Dan Slodge		"Santa Ana Winds" by The Sloppy Boys "Radio Dayze" by The Sloppy Boys "The Bands" by The Sloppy Boys
Episode 604: Hashtag Song Goals with Seth Green	6/3/19	Seth Green; Carl Tart as Trombone Shitty; Jon Daly as Stephen Road; Gil Ozeri as Jonathan Track		
Episode 605: Full Ninja Rights	6/10/19	Max Silvestri; Shaun Diston as Sprague the Whisperer; Dan Lippert as Conroy		
Episode 606: Treasure Hunting with Silversun Pickups	6/17/19	Silversun Pickups; Paul F. Tompkins as Brock Lovett; Jessica McKenna as Margery Kershaw		"It Doesn't Matter Why" by Silversun Pickups "Panic Switch" by Silversun Pickups "Freakazoid" by Silversun Pickups
Episode 607: Are You A Heaux?	6/24/19	Beth Stelling; Ego Nwodim as Judge Heaux Brown; Betsy Sodaro as Icky Spice	Games: Would You Rather?	
Episode 608: Major League Bees	7/1/19	Tim Heidecker; Will Hines as Lester Gayle; Ben Rodgers as Jack Furz		
Episode 609: Donna Sticks Catering Experience	7/8/19	Andy Richter; Lily Sullivan as Donna Sticks; Oscar Montoya as Sam Poppers		
Episode 610: NutsStalgia	7/15/19	Alan Tudyk; Holly Prazoff as Mary Lisa; Ryan Rosenberg as Petey Tweety		
Episode 611: TindTeacher	7/22/19	Bryan Safi; Jon Gabrus as Gino Lombardo; Zac Oyama as Mr. Camp; Edgar Momplaisir as Dr. Chet Mariongello		
Episode 612: The Juice Is Loose	7/29/19	Jimmy Pardo; Carl Tart as O. J. Simpson; Lauren Ashley Smith as Liza Farrington		
Episode 613: Driving Beauty Queens	8/6/19	Moshe Kasher; Natasha Leggero; Drew Tarver as Fred Head; Ele Woods as Sophie Purell		
Episode 614: Bean Dip & Randy Snutz Return: That's What I Said	8/12/19	Adam DeVine; Edi Patterson as herself and Bean Dip; Tim Baltz as himself and Randy Snutz		
Episode 615: The Chastman Family	8/19/19	Tatiana Maslany as herself, Chastity Aspen, and Madildabelle Chastaman; Kristian Bruun as himself and Branston Chastman; Paul F. Tompkins as himself and Robert Chastman; Kirby Howell-Baptiste as herself and Cicilia Chastaman		
Episode 616: Memphis Kansas Breeze with YACHT	8/26/19	YACHT; Shaun Diston as Little Tony Diamonds; Drew Tarver as Brantley Aldean; Carl Tart as Harland Haywood and Danny Diamonds/Jim Parsons		"(Downtown) Dancing" by YACHT "SCATTERHEAD" by YACHT "Blue On Blue" by YACHT
Episode 617: Modern Nursery Rhymes	9/2/19	Anthony Jeselnik; Dan Lippert as Maximilian McSillystein; Dhruv Uday Singh as Art Ketel One	Games: Would You Rather?	
Episode 618: Hot Yogurt	9/9/19	Kevin Nealon; Joe Wengert as Joe Kupso; Lily Sullivan as Yogi Gussy		
Episode 619: The Stars of Between Two Ferns: The Movie	9/15/19	Zach Galifianakis; Lauren Lapkus as herself and Clint Screams; Ryan Gaul as himself and Ichabod Gordy Bradbury; Jiavani Linayao as herself and The Artful Dodger		
Episode 620: Burbank is The Good Place	9/23/19	D'Arcy Carden; Anthony King as Phil Wiggins; John Gemberling as Robert Whistler		
Episode 621: Untitled Wachs Project	9/30/19	Stephanie Wittels Wachs; Dan Lippert as Shemp A. and James; Drew Tarver as Tater, John, and Mayor Ron; Ryan Rosenberg as Corey A. and Jingleheimer		
Episode 622: Pillow Coffin: Rudi North Returns	10/7/19	Jason Mantzoukas; Shaun Diston as Rudi North; Lily Sullivan as Virginia Patricia; Tim Baltz as Darren Matichek		
Episode 623: The Pragmatic Jokers	10/14/19	Sarah Baker; Matt Gourley as himself, Ted Kemper, and Jed Kemper; Paul F. Tompkins as himself, Ned Kemper, and Red Kemper		
Episode 624: Clinkity Clank	10/21/19	Jocelyn DeBoer; Dawn Luebbe; Griffin Newman as Skints McGlinty; Laci Mosley as Tayleigh Lopez		
Episode 625: Petite Modeling	10/28/19	Jon Gabrus as Gino Lombardo; Claudia O'Doherty; Will Hines as Stanley Chamberlin; Ben Rodgers as Chuck Plyman		
Episode 626: Trickery and Rhythm	11/4/19	Max Silvestri; Edgar Momplaisir as Leonard Jonas; Zeke Nicholson as Étouffée		
Episode 627: How Bout That?	11/11/19	Allen Strickland Williams; Holly Prazoff as Mary Lisa; Jiavani Linayao as Carter Meza		
Episode 628: Floating Bus Reform	11/18/19	Joel Kim Booster; Mitra Jouhari; Dan Lippert as Burgey Sullenberger; Zac Oyama as Topher Schmidty		
Episode 629: Pimp My Site	11/25/19	Demi Adejuyigbe; Gabe Gundacker; Ryan Rosenberg as Chef Spaghetti Capellini; Ify Nwadiwe as Xzibit		
Episode 630: Tattoos Clues	12/2/19	Thomas Middleditch as himself, Chauncey Pippins, and Joey Tortellini; Jon Gabrus as Gino Lombardo		
Episode 631: What Are the Coordinates?	12/9/19	Rekha Shankar as herself and Giuseppe Spaghetti; Mary Holland as Sarah Lastnum; Jimmy Fowlie as Chris Creen		
Episode 632: 2019 Holiday Spectacular	12/16/19	Electric Guest; Jason Mantzoukas; Jon Gabrus as Gino Lombardo; Lauren Lapkus as Todd; Shaun Diston as Sprague the Whisperer; Tim Baltz as Darren Matichek; Lily Sullivan as Tracy M. Will Hines as Stanley Chamberlin; Zeke Nicholson as Étouffée; Paul F. Tompkins as Santa Claus; Zach Reino as Dash Grabum; Carl Tart as Harland Haywood; Drew Tarver as Brantley Aldean		"Dollar" by Electric Guest "Oh Devil" by Electric Guest "More" by Electric Guest
Best of 2019 Pt. 1	12/23/19	Paul F. Tompkins	15. Hunters and Rangers (Episode 606: Treasure Hunting with Silversun Pickups); 14. Dip/Snutz (Episode 614: Bean Dip and Randy Snutz Return: That's What I Said); 13. O. J. (Episode 612: The Juice Is Loose); 12. Birds, Bees, Trees, Letters (Episode 615: The Chastman Family)	
Best of 2019 Pt. 2	12/26/19	Paul F. Tompkins	11. Return of the Poet Laureate of the West (Episode 589: Werewolfwithal); 10. Stanley Never Gets To His Bit (Episode 625: Petite Modeling); 9. Entrée and Appetizer (Episode 592: The PeeE Neurs); 1. The Dink Dink Man (Live Episode: Chicago 2019)	
Best of 2019 Pt. 3	12/30/19	Paul F. Tompkins; Brad Evans; Nick Ciarelli	8. Seamus McMahon's Less Famous Brother (Episode 600: Patrick McMahon Returns: A Story About Johnny McGory); 7. From Catchphrase to Character (Episode 584: Weirdamony Alimony Tony); 6. Rise of the North, a Retiree, and Bobbleheads (Episode 622: Pillow Coffin: Rudi North Returns); 5. Martin Sheffield Lickly Returns (Episode 583: Batman Nine-Nine)	"Love Gym" by Drew Tarver "Love Eggs" by Drew Tarver "Love Restaurant" by Drew Tarver "Existence is Emptiness" by Drew Tarver

=== 2020 ===
Episode number	Date	Guests	Synopsis and segments	Featured songs
Best of 2019 Pt. 4	1/2/20	Paul F. Tompkins	4. Gino, Santa, Big Sue, Big Dog, and Leo Carpazzi (Episode 579: 2018 Holiday Spectacular); 3. The Dark Knight and Cal Solomon (Episode 578: Right Off The Batman); 2. Kaitlin and The Mole Man Portal (Episode 588: Lil' Choices); 1. Songs About Trucks (Episode 616: Memphis Kansas Breeze with YACHT)	"The Monster Fuck Part 7 (Haunted-kah)" by Nick Wiger and Jessica McKenna "Pick-Up Truck Birthday" by Drew Tarver and Carl Tart "Truck Prom Dance" by Drew Tarver and Carl Tart "Human Skin Truck Baby" by Drew Tarver and Carl Tart
Episode 633: Forky On Top, Porky On The Bottom	1/6/20	Ben Schwartz; Horatio Sanz as himself, Piggy Sorebacks, and Coco Marx		
Episode 634: Wainscotting, Entree P. Neur & Italiano Jones	1/13/20	David Wain; Ego Nwodim as Entrée PeeE Neur and Sharon; Carl Tart as Italiano Jones		
Episode 635: Peanut Time Machine	1/16/20	Rob Huebel; Erinn Hayes; Jonathan Braylock as George Washington Carver; Jerah Milligan as Lusciously; James III as Marcus Tanner		
Episode 636: Hamburger Spider	1/20/20	Kristian Bruun as himself and Mary Ford; Ben Rodgers as Rusell Karate; Lisa Gilroy as Nana Aukerman		
Episode 637: Moshe Rock, Lord Andrew Lloyd Webber & Jim the Shim	1/27/20	Moshe Kasher; Paul F. Tompkins as Lord Andrew Lloyd Webber, Alimony Tony, and Dame Judi Dench; Tawny Newsome as Jim the Shim/Lord Andrew Lloyd Webber and Rum Tum Tugger		
Episode 638: One Last Heist	2/3/20	Jason Mantzoukas; Shaun Diston as Bullets Jackson; Tim Baltz as Antonio Lambrinidis		
Episode 639: The Becky Button	2/10/20	Andy Samberg; Nick Kroll; Lily Sullivan as Becky and Shannon		
Episode 640: Solo Bolo Sonicolo	2/13/20	Ben Schwartz	Games: Riddle Me This, Pitch a Sitsong, Solo Bolo Olympic Song Challenge	
Episode 641: Not My Aunt	2/17/20	Adam Cayton-Holland; Jessica McKenna as Sherry Barrels; Zach Reino as Dash Grabum		
Episode 642: Chicago Chaperone	2/24/20	Jimmy Pardo; Niccole Thurman as Crystal Del Rey Jenner; Matt Apodaca as Albert Roe		
Episode 643: The Order of the Keepers	3/2/20	Neil Campbell as The Time Keeper; Paul F. Tompkins as JW Stillwater		
Episode 644: Fall Olympics	3/9/20	Jon Gabrus as Gino Lombardo; D'Arcy Carden as Chris Starbo; Brandon Scott Jones as Chris Starbo; Dan Lippert as Bill Walton		
Episode 645: Jack FM Bumpers	3/16/20	Matt Braunger; Will Hines as Lester Brads; Brad Evans as Murf; Nick Ciarelli as Dirt	Games: Would You Rather?	
Episode 646: Ninja Nordstrom	3/23/20	Shaun Diston as Sprague the Whisperer; Lily Sullivan as Sabrina; Jacob Wysocki as Griff Hedgley		
Episode 647: Steak My Day	3/30/20	Paul F. Tompkins as Burnt Millipede; Nicole Parker as Joan Pedestrian; Ryan Gaul as Dickie Caroline's		
Episode 648: Door-to-door Doors	4/6/20	Alan Yang; Lauren Lapkus as Todd; Mike Castle as Gigantic Dan		
Episode 649: Goose Tycoon	4/9/20	Jon Gabrus as Gino Lombardo; Ego Nwodim as Entrée PeeE Neur; Carl Tart as O. J. Simpson; Drew Tarver as Roger Peculiar		
Episode 650: Bun Gun and a Hot Dog Bullet	4/13/20	Jason Mantzoukas; Andy Daly as Dalton Wilcox, August Lindt, and Hot Dog		
Episode 651: Pirates Never Lie	4/20/20	Thomas Middleditch as himself, Captain Littlemember, and Still Tantin; Ben Schwartz as himself, Squawks, and Bill Rantin		
Episode 652: Virtual Styling	4/27/20	Jonathan Van Ness; Edi Patterson as Bean Dip; Tawny Newsome as Auntie Renee; Tim Baltz as Joel Spanaducci		
Episode 653: The 11th Anniversary Show!	5/4/20	Jason Mantzoukas; Paul F. Tompkins as Brock Lovett; Jon Gabrus as Gino Lombardo; Lily Sullivan as Francesca Bolognese; Carl Tart as Roland Gift; Ego Nwodim as Dairy Queen		
Episode 654: LasSie is Benji	5/11/20	Rhys Darby; Paul F. Tompkins as Alimony Tony; Matt Apodaca as Albert Roe		
Episode 655: Zoom Gloom	5/18/20	David Spade; Lauren Lapkus as Big Sue; Seth Morris as Bob Ducca		
Episode 656: A Bonanas for Bonanza Takeover	5/21/20	Andy Daly as Dalton Wilcox; Maria Bamford as Amy Sleeverson; Matt Gourley as Mutt Taylor		
Episode 657: Space Forts, Baby!	5/25/20	Ben Schwartz as himself and Genzer Smartz; Tawny Newsome as herself and Genevieve Smartz; Dan Lippert as Seth Berkowitz		
Episode 658: AcroBATics	6/1/20	Myq Kaplan; Mike Hanford as John Lennon; Jessica McKenna as Dagmar the Small		
Episode 659: Hubba Hubba Punch Up	6/8/20	Judd Apatow; Edi Patterson as Bean Dip; Ego Nwodim as Tony Wyoming; Ben Rodgers as Dar the Beast Master		
Episode 660: Beer with Judy Greer Award	6/15/20	Judy Greer; Shaun Diston as Sprague the Whisperer; Will Hines as Buck Reilly		
Episode 661: The Moser Trio	6/22/20	Paul F. Tompkins as Chejff Moser; Carl Tart as Heepe Moser; Tim Baltz as Pastor Peter Pool Boy		
Episode 662: The Robbies	6/29/20	Rory Scovel as himself and Chester Tumphrie; Sasheer Zamata as herself and Tyler Wiffle; Mary Holland as herself and Francis Stork		
Episode 663: P.A.I.G.E. Is Magic	7/6/20	John Hodgman; David Rees; Paul F. Tompkins as Jill Noll the Magic Doll; Matt Gourley as P.A.I.G.E.		
Episode 664: YouTube, Show Me Haircut	7/13/20	Langston Kerman; Heidi Gardner as Erica; Zac Oyama as Douglas Speaker		
Episode 665: Half a Hartnett	7/20/20	Jim Gaffigan; Lily Sullivan as Amber Lee Tots; Ego Nwodim as QuaranTina Turner		
Episode 666: You Get It?	7/27/20	Yassir Lester; Edi Patterson as Bean Dip; Ryan Gaul as Douglas Gropes; Nick Wiger as Leo Carpazzi		
Episode 667: Andy Samberg Is Not Family	8/3/20	Andy Samberg; Mike Hanford as himself and John Lennon; Tim Kalpakis; Jefferson Dutton; Will Hines as Barry Sams		"The Mastah Bong Rippah" by The Sloppy Boys "Out on the Town" by The Sloppy Boys "Little Miss Socialite" by The Sloppy Boys
Episode 668: Four Siblings	8/10/20	June Diane Raphael; Paul F. Tompkins as Charlie "Burgey" Sullenberger; Jacquis Neal as Bishop R.L. Bakes		
Episode 669: Star Trek: Upper Decker	8/17/20	Jack Quaid as himself, Dash Griswold, and Jeff; Eugene Cordero as himself and Jazz Jazz; Tawny Newsome as herself and Cast Iron		
Episode 670: The Meet Heads	8/24/20	Kyle Bornheimer; Carl Tart as Jerone Buckethat; Lily Sullivan as Trish Maxwell		
Episode 671: Married Thespians	8/31/20	Patton Oswalt; Mike O'Brien as himself and Bob Wessex; Mary Sohn as herself and Cherilyn Wessex		
Episode 672: Busy Burgeys	9/7/20	Busy Philipps; Ego Nwodim as Tricia Seawater; Paul F. Tompkins as Charlie "Burgey" Sullenberger; Dan Lippert as Burgey Sullenberger		
Episode 673: The Grax Apology Tour	9/14/20	Eliza Skinner; Joe Wengert as Grax, Eater of Worlds; Matt Apodaca as Jefferson Milkyway		
Episode 674: Canon Relapse	9/21/20	Shaun Diston as Rudi North; Tim Baltz as Darren Matichek; Edgar Momplaisir as Jerry Major; Paul F. Tompkins as Cake Boss calls in		
Episode 675: Clothing Sausages	9/28/20	Arden Myrin; Lauren Lapkus as Shaden Gallbreath; Brian Jordan Alvarez as Emil		
Episode 676: Juice on Juice	10/5/20	Nick Thune; Jon Gabrus as Gino Lombardo; Lily Sullivan as Francesca Bolognese; Ben Rodgers as Dale Creamy		
Episode 677: The Calvins Family Telethon Extravaganza	10/12/20	Taran Killam as Bever Hopox, Dylan Preeches, Michael Cera, Bronx Girl, Minnesota Guy, Surfer Dude, Coroner, and The Taffy God; Paul Brittain as Chico Hands, Brian Fun, Bronx Guy, and Minnesota Girl; Ryan Gaul as Bisby St. Hancock		
Episode 678: The Heimlich Remix	10/19/20	Steve Byrne; Jimmy O. Yang; Drew Tarver as Henry Heimlich; Katie Rich as JoJo Benassi		
Episode 679: Popcorn World	10/26/20	Gillian Jacobs; Paul F. Tompkins as Alimony Tony; Carl Tart as Orville Redenbacher		
Episode 680: Small Claims Cyborg	11/2/20	Jason Mantzoukas; Thomas Middleditch as himself and Gino Carpuzzi		
Episode 681: Bard and Switch with Aunty Donna	11/9/20	Broden Kelly as himself and Mr. Monroe; Zachary Ruane as himself and Mario; Mark Bonanno as himself and Salvatore Michelangelo		
Episode 682: Colin Quinn's Dream Presentation	11/16/20	Colin Quinn; Jessica McKenna as Margery Kershaw; Will Hines as Morpheus the Dream Lord		
Episode 683: Sidewalk in the Desert	11/23/20	Kulap Vilaysack; SuChin Pak; Ego Nwodim as Ana Conda; Madeline Walter as Mary Berry		
Episode 684: Road Toad	11/30/20	Natalie Palamides as herself, Alex, and Luke Walton; Drew Tarver as Jeff; Ryan Rosenberg as Mike; Dan Lippert as Bill Walton; Jon Mackey as Wade Boggs		
Episode 685: The Fix-It Guys	12/7/20	Paul Rust as himself and Clev; Neil Campbell as himself and Gary		
Episode 686: 2020 Holiday Spectacular	12/14/20	Jason Mantzoukas; Paul F. Tompkins as Santa Claus; Andy Daly as August Lindt; Jon Gabrus as Gino Lombardo; Lauren Lapkus as Ho Ho the Naughty Elf; Ego Nwodim as The Kid Who Saw Mommy Kissing Santa Claus; Carl Tart as The Chief; Lily Sullivan as Nookie; Tim Baltz as Tootie; Shaun Diston as Sprague the Whisperer; Dan Lippert as Frankenstein		
Best of 2020 Part 1	12/21/20	Paul F. Tompkins	16. Two Burgeys (Episode 672: Busy Burgeys); 15. We've Got To Stop Talking About TMNT On CBB (Episode 646: Ninja Nordstrom); 14. Rectangular Things (Episode 634: Wainscotting, Entree P. Neur & Italiano Jones); 13. The Starbos (Episode 644: Fall Olympics)	
Best of 2020 Part 2	12/24/20	Paul F. Tompkins	12. The Mosers (Episode 661: The Moser Trio); 11. Rudi's Recap, Cake Boss, and Bobbleheads (Episode 674: Canon Relapse); 10. The Magic of Podcasts (Episode 663: P.A.I.G.E. Is Magic); 9. Gino Carpuzzi (Episode 680: Small Claims Cyborg)	
Best of 2020 Part 3	12/28/20	Paul F. Tompkins	8. Gillian Goes Gold-Digging (Episode 679: Popcorn World); 7. Treasure Hunting & Social Media (Episode 653: The 11th Anniversary Show); 6. Bee Honey & Taffy Tins (Episode 677: The Calvins Family Telethon Extravaganza); 5. Roger Peculiar (Episode 649: Goose Tycoon)	
Best of 2020 Part 4	12/31/20	Paul F. Tompkins	4. Death of a Water Skier (Episode 650: Bun Gun and a Hot Dog Bullet); 3. No Time To Die (Episode 643: The Order of the Keepers); 2. Bullets Jackson (Episode 638: One Last Heist); 1. Omaha Steaks, Physical Therapy, and Memphis Kansas Breeze (Episode 632: 2019 Holiday Spectacular)	

=== 2021 ===
Episode number	Date	Guests	Synopsis and segments	Featured songs
Episode 687: Full Grown Grogu	1/4/21	Ben Schwartz as himself, Chaniel Leftrowbottom, and Bobby Knuts; Horatio Sanz as himself, Skip Weller, and Shelly Driftwood		
Episode 688: The Sugarhill Gang Museum	1/11/21	Edi Patterson as Bean Dip; Paul F. Tompkins as Cal Solomon		
Episode 689: Marketing Mine Own Selfowitz	1/18/21	Jake Fogelnest; Dan Lippert as Seth Berkowitz; Lyric Lewis as 'Shell		
Episode 690: Spices On Your Meat	1/25/21	Mary Lynn Rajskub; Ego Nwodim as Mrs. Dash; Carl Tart as Mr. Dash; Ben Rodgers as Bud Frakely		
Episode 691: #NoStank	2/1/21	Tim Baltz as Randy Snutz; Shaun Diston as Mike Ruby; Lily Sullivan as Diana Deep		
Episode 692: Chalke Talk, Structure-A-Stuffy & Tunt	2/8/21	Sarah Chalke; Paul F. Tompkins as Bill Eikenberry; Katie Rich as Deb Tunt		
Episode 693: Kissy's Prime	2/15/21	London Hughes; Will Hines as Ruben Stone; Matt Apodaca as Albert Roe		
Episode 694: Thunder Bucket	2/22/21	Adam Brody; Ryan Gaul as Gary Candles; Madeline Walter as Tina		
Episode 695: Spinning Fidgets & Hunting Bounties with Teen #2	3/1/21	Kelly Marie Tran; Kulap Vilaysack; Jessica McKenna as Chrysanthemum Tummers; Zach Reino as Eli Fuseli		
Episode 696: Rather Good	3/8/21	Gillian Jacobs; Diona Reasonover; Paul F. Tompkins as Al A. Peterson; Neil Campbell as Alister Brown		
Episode 697: Good News for Boobs	3/15/21	Fortune Feimster; Dan Lippert as Bill Walton; Jacquis Neal as Jacquis Robinson		
Episode 698: Horse Meat Paninis	3/22/21	Thomas Lennon; Rob Huebel; Lily Sullivan as Lindsay McMulligan; Jay Pichardo as Carmella Areola		
Episode 699: Avatar 2: ACABatar	3/29/21	Dulcé Sloan; Shaun Diston as Sprague the Whisperer; Connor Ratliff as James Cameron; Griffin Newman as Jake Sully		
Episode 700: Plan One: The Scrooge Gang	4/5/21	Jason Mantzoukas; Andy Daly as Byron Denniston, Dalton Wilcox, August Lindt, and Hot Dog		
Episode 701: Promo Code SPORTS	4/12/21	Jamie Lee; Carl Tart as Italiano Jones; Ego Nwodim as Entrée PeeE Neur; Jon Gabrus as Geoff; Ben Rodgers as Jeoff		
Episode 702: Electric Toilet with Don't Stop or We'll Die	4/19/21	Paul Rust; Michael Cassady; Matt Gourley as H.R. Giger; Kaitlyn Tanimoto as Mary Jane Kim		"Flower in My Garden" by Don't Stop or We'll Die "Baby Gets (What Baby Wants)" by Don't Stop or We'll Die
Episode 703: Gaines and Gaines	4/26/21	Langston Kerman; Paul F. Tompkins as Original Fig; James Austin Johnson as Donald Trump		
Episode 704: The 12th Anniversary Show!	5/3/21	Jason Mantzoukas; Manchester Orchestra; Andy Daly as Byron Denniston and Dalton Wilcox; Paul F. Tompkins as The Griz; Jessica McKenna as Margery Kershaw; Tim Baltz as Randy Snutz; Lily Sullivan as Carissa; Shaun Diston as Sprague the Whisperer; Jon Gabrus as Gino Lombardo; Carl Tart as Charles Barkley; Dan Lippert as Rabbi Bill Walton; Ego Nwodim as Charlotte Hornette		"Bed Head" by Manchester Orchestra "Keel Timing" by Manchester Orchestra "Telepath" by Manchester Orchestra
Episode 705: Better Call Bed Bath & Beyond	5/10/21	Bob Odenkirk; Lily Sullivan as Francesca Bolognese; Griffin Newman as Skints McGlinty		
Episode 706: Mind Google	5/17/21	J. B. Smoove; Carl Tart as O. J. Simpson; Will Hines as Gary the Robot		
Episode 707: 6 Foot Long Sticks	5/24/21	Paul F. Tompkins as Lavinia Marsh Caruthers aka Shevel Knievel, Little Joe Bardi, The Big Dammit Man, and Gavin's Friend; Dan Lippert as Mark Patsy and Big Charlie Bardi; Monika Smith as Bob Parks		
Episode 708: Common Slaw	5/31/21	Nikki Glaser; Zach Reino as Gareth Cloakman; Zac Oyama as Mr. Camp		
Episode 709: Sprague's Survivor	6/7/21	Jon Gabrus as Gino Lombardo; Shaun Diston as Sprague the Whisperer; Will Hines as Andy Manders and Morpheus the Dream Lord; Mike Hanford as Zoobi Condarino and John Lennon		
Episode 710: A Trio of Duos	6/14/21	Sparks; Edgar Wright; Ben Rodgers as Jack Furz; Matt Apodaca as Buck Tango		
Episode 711: The Heimlich B-Side	6/21/21	Patton Oswalt; Meredith Salenger; Drew Tarver as Henry Heimlich; Betsy Sodaro as Little Debbie		
Episode 712: Tides Anonymous	6/28/21	Max Silvestri; Paul F. Tompkins as Burnt Millipede; Nicole Parker as Joan Pedestrian; Jacquis Neal as Bishop R.L. Bakes		
Episode 713: 3 Time Pizzas and Goose Liver Pate	7/5/21	Mike Mitchell; Neil Campbell as Maxwell Keeper; Carl Tart as Cleotis Martholobew; Jessica Jean Jardine as Wolfgang Puck		
Episode 714: Twilight 2: Top Chef	7/12/21	Ziwe; Ryan Rosenberg as Coach Billips; Jessica McKenna as Chrysanthemum Trummers		
Episode 715: Ho No Dew Didn't	7/19/21	Haley Joel Osment; Shaun Diston as Mike Ruby; Joe Wengert as JP Fossord; Raiza Licea as Juslani Marilyn		
Episode 716: Meemaw and Them	7/26/21	Casey Wilson; Paul F. Tompkins as Eddie Lee Capers; Katie Rich as Connie Depandi		
Episode 717: Tighten Those Nuts	8/2/21	Felicia Day; Janet Varney; Matt Apodaca as The Great Magna; Holly Prazoff as Mary Lisa		
Episode 718: Hey, Where is Everybody?	8/9/21	Tawny Newsome as herself and Billa Beth; Jack Quaid as himself and Thurl Ravenscroft; Ryan Gaul as Darryl Who		
Episode 719: Give It To Gilli!	8/16/21	Gillian Jacobs; Will Hines as Henry Sames; Dan Lippert as Bill Walton and R. L. Stine		
Episode 720: Rita Rasvegas	8/23/21	Hannah Einbinder; Monika Smith as Baby Boy Boy; Jacob Wysocki as Tommy the Green Power Ranger		
Episode 721: Passion of the Pasta	8/30/21	Phoebe Bridgers; Ego Nwodim as Pastor Pasta; Drew Tarver as Fred Head		
Episode 722: Cowdy Partner	9/6/21	Andy Samberg; Ryan Rosenberg as Dusty; Neil Campbell as The Answer Seeker		
Episode 723: Bell Biv DeVito	9/13/21	Kristian Bruun; Paul F. Tompkins as Lorenzo Borgia and The Ghost of Stan Lee; Suzi Barrett as Lane Driver		
Episode 724: Four Super Producers	9/20/21	Ike Barinholtz as himself and Gary Filipowski; Katie Rich as herself and Marge Filipowski; Shaun Diston as Sprague the Whisperer		
Episode 725: Blitzen D'Onofrio	9/27/21	Jason Mantzoukas; Andy Daly as Dalton Wilcox; Tim Baltz as Darren Matichek		
Episode 726: Church of Commercials	10/4/21	Sasheer Zamata as herself and Dina the Dinosaur; Lily Sullivan as Harper L. Cosmopolitan; Carl Tart as Reverend Good Feeling		
Episode 727: Zig Zag Lights	10/11/21	Vanessa Bayer; Will Hines as Brent Finley; Edgar Momplaisir as Mack Attack		
Episode 728: Phoebing for Some Phoebes	10/18/21	Jon Gabrus as Gino Lombardo; Phoebe Robinson; Paul F. Tompkins as Kevin Attenborough; Casey Feigh as Officer Dreary		
Episode 729: Beethoven's 5th: F*ck the Fourth	10/25/21	Edgar Wright; Bobby Moynihan as Jonathan Biting; Dan Lippert as Ian Appaloosa		
Episode 730: Solo Bolo Hallowolo	10/28/21	Ben Schwartz; Nick Wiger as Leo Carpazzi	Games: Solo Bolo Olympic Song Challenge	
Episode 731: Nutshell Yourself	11/1/21	Jason Mantzoukas; Andy Daly as Byron Denniston, Hot Dog, and Dalton Wilcox		
Episode 732: Pause and Respond	11/8/21	Laurie Kilmartin; Matt Apodaca as Albert Roe; Lily Sullivan as Sammy Samantha; Jacquis Neal as Justin the Pickup Artist		
Episode 733: City Limit Beans	11/15/21	"Weird Al" Yankovic; Tim Baltz as Maurice Flatbottom; Vic Michaelis as Morgan Weeston-Smythe		
Episode 734: Elderly Whisperer	11/22/21	Aisling Bea; Paul F. Tompkins as Lord Andrew Lloyd Webber; Madeline Walter as Brenda Tattletale		
Episode 735: The Calvins Triplets vs. The Baxter Triplets	11/29/21	Taran Killam as Bever Hopox and Quita Baxter; Paul Brittain as Chico Hands and Tanya Baxter; Ryan Gaul as Bisby St. Hancock and Candide Baxter		
Episode 736: Potato Fambly	12/6/21	Jimmy Pardo; Danielle Koenig; Suzi Barrett as Uggams the Potato; Joey Greer as Mickey Babyboy		
Episode 737: 2021 Holiday Spectacular	12/13/21	Paul F. Tompkins as Mike the Janitor; Shaun Diston as Mike Ruby; Tim Baltz as Randy Snutz; Jessica McKenna as Dagmar the Small; Will Hines as Bennett Quints; Carl Tart as Chief; Dan Lippert as Michael Lindsay-Hogg; Mary Holland as Crapy the Reindeer; Matt Apodaca as Albert Roe		
Best of 2021 Part 1	12/20/21	Paul F. Tompkins	15. A Concerned Citizen (Episode 716: Meemaw and Them); 14. Italiano & Entree (Episode 701: Promo Code SPORTS); 13. One Of The Great Cartographers! (Episode 719: Give It To Gilli!); 12. What's Up, Hot Dog? (Episode 731: Nutshell Yourself)	
Best of 2021 Part 2	12/23/21	Paul F. Tompkins	11. Smashing Guitars (Episode 721: Passion of the Pasta); 10. Cal's Legacy (Episode 688: The Sugarhill Gang Museum); 9. Nobody & Bolognese (Episode 705: Better Call Bed Bath & Beyond); 8. Bonanas For Bobbleheads (Episode 725: Blitzen D'Onofrio)	
Best of 2021 Part 3	12/27/21	Paul F. Tompkins	7. Narrated by Kevin Attenborough (Episode 728: Phoebing for Some Phoebes); 6. Winning The Best-Of's (Episode 709: Sprague's Survivor); 5. Santa's Got Nothing (Episode 686: 2020 Holiday Spectacular); 4. Being Prince Phillip (Episode 700: Plan One: The Scrooge Gang)	
Best of 2021 Part 4	12/30/21	Paul F. Tompkins	3. Randy's Deal and Mike's Steps (Episode 691: #NoStank); 2. The Griz! (Episode 704: The 12th Anniversary Show!); 1. NCIS, Smooth Criminals, and Art Criticism (Episode 696: Rather Good)	

=== 2022 ===
Episode number	Date	Guests	Synopsis and segments	Featured songs
Episode 738: Three Doctors...Oh No	1/3/22	Ben Schwartz as himself and Dr. Sturgeon the Rock n Roll Surgeon; Katie Dippold as Dr. Yvette Victor; Gil Ozeri as Dr. Sweetchat the Small Talk Robot		
Episode 739: Oi Noi, BB Bridgers!	1/10/22	Lily Sullivan as Bicky; Carl Tart as MC Sugar Butt and Italiano Jones; Ego Nwodim as Pastor Pasta		
Episode 740: A Bar Mangled Manor	1/17/22	Paul F. Tompkins as Alimony Tony; Dave Theune as Robby Delmuda; Toni Charline as Max the Dog		
Episode 741: Podcast Rescue	1/24/22	Roy Wood Jr. Devin Field as Ron Snapper; Zeke Nicholson as Bone Queef; Vic Michaelis as Willadeene Marie Bates		
Episode 742: Wain Packaged Foods	1/31/22	David Wain; Dan Lippert as Bill Walton; Ele Woods as Amber Bolt		
Episode 743: Over/Under	2/7/22	David Cross; Tim Baltz as Antonio Lambrinidis; Lisa Gilroy as Dickie Donnelly		
Episode 744: The Three White Amigos and Dart	2/14/22	Ego Nwodim as Scapegoat Smith; Will Hines as Jonas Kings; Matt Apodaca as Dude Fiero		
Episode 745: McGruff the Grind Dog	2/21/22	Anders Holm; Shaun Diston as McGruff the Crime Dog; Jacquis Neal as Justin		
Episode 746: James Bond Dolls for Sale	2/28/22	Langston Kerman; Paul F. Tompkins as Al A. Peterson; Matt Gourley as himself and P.A.I.G.E. Townland	Andy Daly and Mark McConville appear in a post-credits scene as Joe Bongo and Joe Walsh, respectively.	"Gin Atomic" by Townland "War" by Townland
Episode 747: Honky Tonk Badonkalonk Weekend	3/7/22	John Gemberling as Winston Carmel; Joe Wengert as Dr. Kevin Kenwait; Raiza Licea as Phoebe Chi Chi Roo		
Episode 748: Twink Christ	3/14/22	Lennon Parham as Dr. Helma Plinkton; Jacob Wysocki as Barry Bunbuster Barryball; Madeline Walter as Eileen Dogg		
Episode 749: Time Loop	3/21/22	D'Arcy Carden; Vic Michaelis as Emma Simon Knee-Keller; Matt Apodaca as Ricky Johnson		
Episode 750: The Pool Duel-Over: Part Duel	3/28/22	Jason Mantzoukas; Andy Daly as Byron Denniston, Hot Dog, and Dalton Wilcox; Paul F. Tompkins as The Griz, Brock Lovett, Al A. Peterson, JW Stillwater, and Shimmy		
Episode 751: From Candy Boy to TV Boy	4/4/22	Adam Scott; Will Hines as Thomas Mashed-Potatoes; Suzi Barrett as Mariska Beenaboutta		
Episode 752: Wet Day Special	4/10/22	Paul F. Tompkins as himself and Spike Minksalmon; Drew Tarver as Ike Minksalmon; Ryan Gaul as Doug Gropes		
Episode 753: Grilling with the Zouks	4/17/22	Natasha Leggero; Lily Sullivan as Kayla Dickie; Mike Hanford as Adjacent Mantzoukas; Peter Banifaz as Dr. Anthony Fauci		
Episode 754: Top Letterboxd Reviews	4/24/22	Claudia O'Doherty; Carl Tart as O.J. Simpson; Brad Evans as Kelvin; Nick Ciarelli as Travis		
Episode 755: The 13th Anniversary Show!	5/1/22	Dan Lippert as Bill Walton; Stars; Paul F. Tompkins as Big Chunky Bubbles; Lily Sullivan as Francesca Bolognese; Tim Baltz as Richie Castlebaum; Ego Nwodim as Pastor Pasta; Shaun Diston as Garry the Gardener; Will Hines as Keith Stanley		"Build a Fire" by Stars "Capelton Hill" by Stars "Pretenders" by Stars
Episode 756: Water Ghost Rules	5/9/22	Jonah Ray; Zac Oyama as Tim Bullock; Ego Nwodim as Bathina Salts; Heather Anne Campbell as Cynthia Blake		
Episode 757: Warning Jeans	5/16/22	Edi Patterson as Bean Dip; Ben Rodgers as Brooke Flagstaff; Devin Field as Jack Persimmons		
Episode 758: Previous Partons	5/23/22	Paul F. Tompkins as Cal Solomon; Lisa Gilroy as Peanut Parton; James Mannion as Alan Stubbs		
Episode 759: Hot Sauce Reunion	5/30/22	Ben Schwartz; Gil Ozeri as himself, Irving Sardinas, and Gabriel Sardinas; Adam Pally as himself and Bro		
Episode 760: The Four Questions	6/6/22	Andy Richter; Jon Gabrus as Gino Lombardo; Vic Michaelis as Susie Tewman; Casey Feigh as Young Scott		
Episode 761: Plumbing Wars	6/13/22	Shaun Diston as Franky Flush; Lily Sullivan as Lena Dunne Homme; Ronnie Adrian as Jack Lusty		
Episode 762: Beef Bank	6/20/22	Ryan Rosenberg as Craig Zlist aka Fishy; Monika Smith as Ethel B. Dumphrey; Dave Theune as Ernie Schrempf and Mick Hall		
Episode 763: Star Toon Cartoon	6/27/22	Jack Quaid as himself and Dr. John; Paul F. Tompkins as Brock Lovett and Shimmy; Tawny Newsome as Tierna and Lisa		
Episode 764: iFrasier	7/4/22	Jon Daly as Kelsey Grammer; Dan Lippert as Superman; Ryan Gaul as Tobias Boothby		
Episode 765: Pirate Ship Energy	7/11/22	Adam Pally as himself and Johnny Depp; Jon Gabrus as himself and Gino Lombardo; Ben Rodgers as Jack Furz; Lisa Gilroy as Bethany Waterbottle		
Episode 766: Kushtopia	7/18/22	Howard Kremer; Brett Morris; Will Hines as Hughie Chism; Jacob Wysocki as Mr. Toots		
Episode 767: Fourdom	7/25/22	Paul F. Tompkins as himself and Jarles; Lauren Lapkus as herself and Carmine DeLonge; Mary Holland as Haney Dilf		
Episode 768: Scatch a Rising Star	8/1/22	Patton Oswalt; Suzi Barrett as Ellen Norton-Simon Harris-Finley Finister; Dave Theune as Dean Hormel; Peter Banifaz as Johnny Scat		
Episode 769: Cowbell Saul	8/8/22	Bob Odenkirk; James Austin Johnson as Bobby Flay; Carl Tart as Italiano Jones		
Episode 770: She-Garbage People	8/15/22	Tatiana Maslany; Paul F. Tompkins as Obi Ron Kenobi; Caitlin Reilly as Lucy Bukater		
Episode 771: Bean Time with Silversun Pickups	8/22/22	Silversun Pickups; Will Hines as Keith Keith; Matt Apodaca as Officer Marshal Sergeant; Ele Woods as Maximo Tootie		"Scared Together" by Silversun Pickups "Sticks and Stones" by Silversun Pickups "Lazy Eye" by Silversun Pickups
Episode 772: Half-Wonka/Half-Loompa	8/29/22	Bridger Winegar; Paul F. Tompkins as The Pie Minister and Shimmy; Lamar Woods as Dre Wonka		
Episode 773: Olafer Only	9/5/22	Adam Scott; Matt Besser as Olaf's Middle Part; Monika Smith as Harvey the Truth Seeker; Toni Charline as Martha the Medium		
Episode 774: InFletchtion	9/12/22	Jon Hamm; Lily Sullivan as Bridget Jones; Devin Field as Steve Spinx		
Episode 775: Operation Double Decoy	9/19/22	Jason Mantzoukas; Andy Daly as Byron Denniston; Paul F. Tompkins as The Griz		
Episode 776: Live from The Paramount Theatre, Austin TX 08/06/2022	9/22/22	Paul F. Tompkins as Chesley "Sully" Sullenberger; Carl Tart as MC Sugar Butt; Dan Lippert as Todd Padre		
Episode 777: Postal Opposites	9/26/22	Rachel Bloom; James Mannion as Chris Orchard; Matt Apodaca as Albert Roe		
Episode 778: Celebrity Auction List	10/3/22	Dan Wilson; Paul Rust as Cecil Sotheby; Christine Bullen as Myrtle McGee; Charlie McCrackin as Cordwood Pete Bunyan		"Dancing on the Moon" by Dan Wilson "Closing Time" by Dan Wilson
Episode 779: He Did It His Way	10/10/22	Kyle Bornheimer; Dan Lippert as Lloyd Garterbelt; Erin Keif as Matilda Gravyman		
Episode 780: Bong Hugs	10/17/22	Sharon Horgan; Paul F. Tompkins as Original Fig; Casey Feigh as Weed Seinfeld		
Episode 781: Ump-and-coming Umps	10/24/22	Kevin Nealon; Ryan Rosenberg as Donald Ump; Dave Theune as Robby Delmuda		
Episode 782: Unique Stuff	10/31/22	Kurt Braunohler; Mike Hanford as John Lennon; Jacob Wysocki as COOTER the supercomputer Nick Wiger as Leo Carpazzi		
Episode 783: YouTube Review	11/7/22	Natalie Morales; Jillian Bell; Griffin Newman as CJTETHEMAN9888_UNLIMITED and Calvin Ward; Christine Bullen as Piper Adoggy		
Episode 784: The Princess Sprite	11/14/22	Nick Kroll; John Gemberling as Mutty Brickford; Gil Ozeri as Ned Belanela		
Episode 785: Buzzyear Headlines	11/21/22	Jason Mantzoukas; Seth Morris as Bob Ducca; Erin Whitehead as Stacy Buzzaba; Paul F. Tompkins as Shimmy and Jarles	Games: Would You Rather?	
Episode 786: Ford Rock Hard Eve	11/28/22	Max Silvestri; Tim Baltz as Harry Footman; Lily Sullivan as Kayla Dickie		
Episode 787: Nature, Nurture, Nietzche	12/5/22	Kristian Bruun; Paul F. Tompkins as Major Bob Driver and Shimmy; Matt Gourley as Teen Giger; Lisa Gilroy as Peonis Pilates		"Christmas on the Rocks" by Townland
Episode 788: 2022 Holiday Spectacular	12/12/22	Paul F. Tompkins as Obi Ron Kenobi; Shaun Diston as McGruff the Crime Dog; Jon Gabrus as Gino Lombardo; Lily Sullivan as Francesca Bolognese; Carl Tart as Charles Barkley; Jessica McKenna as Harry Styles; Will Hines as Henry; Vic Michaelis as Susie Tewman; Lisa Gilroy as Dickie Donnelly; Gil Ozeri as Dr. Sweetchat		
Best of 2022 Part 1	12/19/22	Paul F. Tompkins	17. Bridget Jones’ Diarrhea (Episode 774: InFletchtion); 16. Help Me, Obi-Ron (Episode 770: She-Garbage People); 15. The Return of Bob Ducca (Episode 785: Buzzyear Headlines); 14. Baba Booey (Episode 746: James Bond Dolls for Sale); 13. Holiday Madness! (Episode 737: 2021 Holiday Spectacular)	
Best of 2022 Part 2	12/22/22	Paul F. Tompkins	12. The Baxter FKA Decker Triplets Pig Wrestling And Caramel Country Maaaart (Episode 735: The Calvins Triplets vs. The Baxter Triplets); 11. Carmine's Memory (Episode 767: Fourdom); BONUS CLIP: Jack Can't Talk Today (Episode 763: Star Toon Cartoon); 10. Vigilantes & Bullies (Episode 765: Pirate Ship Energy); 9. One Of The Great Anniversaries! (Episode 755: The 13th Anniversary Show!)	
Best of 2022 Part 3	12/26/22	Paul F. Tompkins	8. A Pastor, An MC, & An Australian Actress (Episode 739: Oi Noi, BB Bridgers!); 7. The Peanut Prototype (Episode 758: Previous Partons); 6. The Busiest Man In The World (Episode 784: The Princess Sprite); 5. Denniston Vs. Griz II (Episode 750: The Pool Duel-Over: Part Duel)	
Best of 2022 Part 4	12/29/22	Paul F. Tompkins	4. The Zerg & Noryb (Episode 775: Operation Double Decoy); 3. The Tapes Of Gabriel Sardinas (Episode 759: Hot Sauce Reunion); 2. Stay Away From Their Granddaughter (Episode 752: Wet Day Special); 1. Dr. Sweetchat, The Small Talk Robot (Episode 738: Three Doctors... Oh No)	

=== 2023 ===
Episode number	Date	Guests	Synopsis and segments	Featured songs
Episode 789: Oh My God, Becky	1/2/23	Ben Schwartz as himself and Yohan Breitbark; Drew Tarver as Henry Heimlich; Mary Holland as Barb Nuts		
Episode 790: Mannequin Skywalker	1/9/23	Allison Williams; Dan Lippert as Bill Walton; Erin Keif as Macy Hannigan		
Episode 791: She Splashy She Splishy Cruise Ship	1/16/23	Jason Woliner; Lily Sullivan as Chippy Dipps; Will Hines as Bill Smither; Casey Feigh as Joey Salsa		
Episode 792: Murder Was Wrote	1/23/23	Paul F. Tompkins as Ted Newguy; Ego Nwodim as Stormy Kirkland and Fred; Matt Apodaca as Ricky Johnson and Maya Newguy		
Episode 793: Coca-Cola Loaded	1/30/23	Reggie Watts; Vic Michaelis as Oopsie Spider-Man; Dave Theune as Tam Pasture		
Episode 794: Sloppy Firsts	2/6/23	Dan Mangan; Lauren Lapkus as Cabin Fevver; Ryan Rosenberg as Dr. Crack	Games: Would You Rather?	"Just Know It" by Dan Mangan "All Roads" by Dan Mangan "Fire Escape" by Dan Mangan
Episode 795: Dr. Skeleton's Celebrity Toilet	2/13/23	John Hodgman; Paul F. Tompkins as Brock Lovett; Lisa Gilroy as Elvis Presley		
Episode 796: Hans's Opus	2/20/23	Zach Galifianakis; Edi Patterson as Bean Dip; Andy Daly as August Lindt	Games: Would You Rather?	
Episode 797: Hold for Room Tone	2/27/23	Jason Alexander; Peter Tilden; Shaun Diston as Tony Nails; Jessica McKenna as Filomena Trappp		
Episode 798: Hostage Forecast	3/1/23	David Cross; James Mannion as Ryan Headboard; Holly Laurent as Sherry Pie; Greg Hess as Jim Bolt		
Episode 799: Bruba Go Do	3/6/23	Nick Kroll; Ike Barinholtz; Mitra Jouhari as Andi; Gil Ozeri as Ned Belanela		
Episode 800: Operation Golden Orb	3/13/23	Jason Mantzoukas; Andy Daly as Byron Denniston and Hot Dog; Paul F. Tompkins as Lord Andrew Lloyd Webber, The Griz, and Shimmy		
Episode 801: WiFi For A Wife Guy	3/20/23	Andy Samberg; Neil Campbell as Himself and Dirty Dog; Lily Sullivan as Sister Margaret		
Episode 802: Crown Prince of Slime	3/27/23	Jay Pharoah; Bobby Moynihan as Batman; Tim Baltz as Darren Matichek		
Episode 803: John Wick: My Eyes Are Up Here	4/3/23	David Wain; Katie Rich as Leia; Hannah Pilkes as Susan Christmas		
Episode 804: Wet Day Special 2023	4/10/23	Paul F. Tompkins as himself and Spike Minksalmon; Drew Tarver as Ike Minksalmon; Ryan Gaul as Pudge		
Episode 805: Wet Work Nurse	4/17/23	Jon Gabrus as Gino Lombardo; Dave Theune as Robby Delmuda; Ben Rodgers as Ernest Taylor		
Episode 806: Swiwwy Boys with Aunty Donna	4/20/23	Broden Kelly as himself and Australian Dad on a Holiday; Zachary Ruane as himself and Jimmy/A Slice of Lime; Mark Bonanno as himself and Silly Boy		
Episode 807: Live at Largo	4/24/23	Jason Mantzoukas; Paul F. Tompkins as Drew L. Barrymore; Andy Daly as Dalton Wilcox; Carl Tart as The Chief; Tim Baltz as Randy Snutz; Lily Sullivan as Francesca Bolognese; Gil Ozeri as Dr. Sweetchat		
Episode 808: Live at the Bell House #1	4/26/23	Jason Mantzoukas; Adam Scott; Paul F. Tompkins as Big Chunky Bubbles; Mike Hanford as John Lennon; Griffin Newman as Silver Screen Sammy		
Episode 809: Live at the Bell House #2	4/28/23	Jason Mantzoukas; Paul F. Tompkins as Cal Solomon; Ego Nwodim as Pastor Pasta; Connor Ratliff as Mr. Books		
Episode 810: The 14th Anniversary Show!	5/1/23	Jason Mantzoukas; Andy Daly as Hot Dog; Paul F. Tompkins as Fred Guinness and Shimmy; Jessica McKenna as Dagmar the Small; Shaun Diston as Rudi North; Drew Tarver as Clam; Lisa Gilroy as Pearl; Lily Sullivan as Bicky; Tim Baltz as Harry Footman; Carl Tart as Snake Eyes and The Chief; Will Hines as Anniversary Man the Demon; Dan Lippert as Bill Walton		
Episode 811: We Bought An Oil Rig	5/8/23	Dan Ahdoot; Vic Michaelis as Taylor Stephanie; Casey Feigh as Weed Foxworthy		
Episode 812: Oops I Dropped This	5/15/23	Sean Clements; Hayes Davenport; Will Hines as Kenny Kicks; Christine Bullen as Fifinella		
Episode 813: Winkers and Blinkers	5/22/23	Jena Friedman; Heather Anne Campbell as Grance Prebs; Jacob Wysocki as Marty Motorcycle		
Episode 814: The Institute	5/29/23	Sarah Silverman; Suzi Barrett as Destiny; Shaun Diston as Crenshaw		
Episode 815: Fantom of the Phorest	6/5/23	Fortune Feimster; Paul F. Tompkins as Lord Andrew Lloyd Webber; Matt Apodaca as Mr. Monster		
Episode 816: Love, Bridge	6/12/23	Jack Quaid as himself and Dr. John; Lily Sullivan as Bridget Jones; Carl Tart as The Crypt Keeper, Italiano Jones and O.J. Simpson		
Episode 817: Nostalgia Bombs	6/19/23	Nick Kroll; John Gemberling as Korbato Krim; Gil Ozeri as Yargo Lamento		
Episode 818: Thumb No. 3, 4, 5	6/26/23	Myq Kaplan; Greg Hess as Glen Plapinger; Erin Keif as Candle St. Louis		
Episode 819: Man's Laughter In the First Degree	7/3/23	Paul F. Tompkins as Fred Guinness; Lisa Gilroy as Kyle Chutney; Neil Campbell as Noel		
Episode 820: Limo Karaoke	7/10/23	Vera Drew; Tim Baltz as Randy Snutz; Casey Feigh as Joey Salsa		
Episode 821: Smooth Denim	7/17/23	Adam DeVine; Ryan Rosenberg as Mr. Sing; Ify Nwadiwe as Shadow Vision		
Episode 822: Honey, I Shrunk Her	7/24/23	Anna Konkle; Mitra Jouhari as Leila; Christine Bullen as Myrtle McGee		
Episode 823: Hand Friends with Manchester Orchestra	7/31/23	Andy Hull; Robert McDowell; Tawny Newsome as herself and Tierna Smarg; Edi Patterson as Bean Dip; Dave Theune as Mirk		"Capital Karma" by Manchester Orchestra "The Way" by Manchester Orchestra
Episode 824: Toe Show	8/7/23	Mike Hanford as Chef Adjacent Mantzoukas; James Austin Johnson as VAAMM; Ele Woods as Young Miss Willow Panloose		
Episode 825: Any Questions, Poindexter?	8/14/23	Ellie Kemper; Matt Apodaca as Ronnie Little; Jacob Wysocki as Gunk Little; Hannah Pilkes as Brett		
Episode 826: Viral Beatdown	8/21/23	Andy Richter; Vic Michaelis as Susie Tewman; Alex Fernie as Daniel Kolodjiez		
Episode 827: Sea Witch Six	8/28/23	Paul F. Tompkins as Abernathy Combs; Erin Whitehead as Ursula; John Hartman as Ken Lunch		
Episode 828: Conversation Referee	9/4/23	Jack Quaid as himself and Greg; Tawny Newsome as herself and Brigadoon; James Mannion as Robert Canasta		
Episode 829: Love is Truck	9/11/23	Flula Borg; Shaun Diston as Sprague the Whisperer; Lily Sullivan as Kayla Dickie		
Episode 830: Being Bi-Brainial	9/18/23	Gary Gulman; Dan Lippert as Rick Rubin; Dan O'Connor as Ian Chiswick		
Episode 831: Hugs Between Friends	9/25/23	Aparna Nancherla; Will Hines as Kurt Slammer; Holly Laurent as Ruth Debevoise		
Episode 832: Cockroach Hell	10/2/23	Paul F. Tompkins as Dolores Brainwater; Mitra Jouhari as Casey; Lisa Gilroy as Cockroach Rick		
Episode 833: Abraham LinkedIn	10/9/23	Bob Odenkirk; Edi Patterson as Bean Dip; Tim Baltz as Tom Boreman; Heather Anne Campbell as Telli Charcuterie		
Episode 834: Mouse Mingle	10/16/23	Reggie Watts; Matt Gourley as Cody; Amanda Lund as Codi; Katie Rich as Janet; Holly Laurent as Leanne		
Episode 835: Oh, Hell Maybe!	10/23/23	Sam Jay; Gil Ozeri as Bane; Greg Hess as Benny Sands		
Episode 836: Twins by Blood	10/30/23	Felicia Day; Betsy Sodaro as Selma; Mano Agapion as Blair; Devin Field as David Lynch		
Episode 837: The Scrounger	11/6/23	Dan Wilson; Paul Rust as AJ Zap; Erin Keif as Criss Angel; Casey Feigh as Donk Poop		"You're Not Alone" by Dan Wilson "Little Bit of Sun" by Dan Wilson
Episode 838: Peter Pogdanovich	11/13/23	Edgar Wright; Paul F. Tompkins as Brock Lovett; Vic Michaelis as Quiet the Mime; Matt Apodaca as Marcus Green		
Episode 839: O.B.Have	11/20/23	Jon Hamm; Drew Tarver as Jesse; Ryan Gaul as Doug Gropes		
Episode 840: Little Pepper Makes Four	11/27/23	Chelsea Peretti; James Mannion as Micah Fellows; Ben Rodgers as Uncle Jellyfish		
Episode 841: Diagnosis What?	12/4/23	John Early; Mitra Jouhari as Angelina Leviosa; Amanda Lund as Marabel May		
Episode 842: Two Straws and a Goldshlåger	12/11/23	Edi Patterson as Bean Dip and Deeana Bermuda; Dave Theune as Robby Delmuda; Jacob Wysocki as RJ Dudley and Jack UCLA; Allison Dunbar as Rhonda Batuchi		
Episode 843: 2023 Holiday Spectacular	12/18/23	Jason Mantzoukas; Paul F. Tompkins as Fred Guinness; Tim Baltz as Randy Snutz; Lily Sullivan as Carissa; Shaun Diston as Room Tone Tony; Vic Michaelis as Terry Alamander; Carl Tart as Shohei Ohtani; Drew Tarver as Clam; Lisa Gilroy as Pearl; Dan Lippert as Dr. Marty Goldstein; Gil Ozeri as Ned Belanela; Will Hines as Harvey the Devil		
Best of 2023 Part 1	12/25/23	Paul F. Tompkins	16. He Blew It. (Episode 839: O.B.Have); 15. Mythical Beings (Episode 787: Nature, Nurture, Nietzche); 14. Heimlich & Nuts (Episode 789: Oh My God, Becky); 13. Scott Needs Tech Support (Episode 796: Hans's Opus)	
Best of 2023 Part 2	12/28/23	Paul F. Tompkins	12. bark bark. (Episode 801: WiFi For A Wife Guy); 11. Quite The Mime, Ouah! (Episode 838: Peter Pogdanovich); 10. Remember This (Episode 817: Nostalgia Bombs); 9. Scott's Tension With Guests (Episode 788: 2022 Holiday Spectacular)	

=== 2024 ===
Episode number	Date	Guests	Synopsis and segments	Featured song
Best of 2023 Part 3	1/1/24	Paul F. Tompkins	8. Bridget Bones’ DIE-ary! (Episode 816: Love, Bridge); 7. “You Tried To Kill Me, Scott!” (Episode 832: Cockroach Hell); 6. Hot Dog, Guinness, and Pig Shit (Episode 810: The 14th Anniversary Show!); 5. Griz v. LAW (Episode 800: Operation Golden Orb)	
Best of 2023 Part 4	1/4/24	Paul F. Tompkins	4. Boys Being Boys (Episode 819: Man's Laughter In the First Degree); 3. Shroomami (Episode 799: Bruba Go Do); 2. Avoidable Granddaughters & Missing Dogs (Episode 804: Wet Day Special 2023); 1. Little Baby Momma (Episode 795: Dr. Skeleton's Celebrity Toilet)	
Episode 844: Full Stilts, Full Tilt	1/8/24	Ben Schwartz as himself, Sean Lantern-Phil, George Lucas, and Lucas Foster; Mary Holland as Delia Totebag; Eugene Cordero as Veronica		
Episode 845: So New York	1/15/24	Jake Johnson; Paul F. Tompkins as Alimony Tony; Lily Sullivan as Bridget Jones		
Episode 846: Doug Can Do It Too	1/22/24	Natasha Lyonne; Jacqueline Novak; Alex Fernie as Doug; Sandy Honig as Jenny Power		
Episode 847: Benmont Bologna’s Meat Flavored Cologne	1/25/24	Adam Cayton-Holland; Jon Gabrus as Gino Lombardo; Erin Keif as Matilda Gravyman; Greg Hess as Benmont Bologna		
Episode 848: Raisin Kids	1/29/24	Zach Woods; Lisa Gilroy as Margo Tits; Charlie McCrackin as Mr. Gunlock		
Episode 849: One Capful, 14 Buckets	2/5/24	Moshe Kasher; Carl Tart as The Pine-Sol Lady; Vic Michaelis as Tinselina the Green Fairy		
Episode 850: The Exorcism of Hot Dog	2/12/24	Jason Mantzoukas; Andy Daly as Byron Denniston, Hot Dog, August Lindt, Don DiMello, Dalton Wilcox, and Golly; Paul F. Tompkins as Lord Andrew Lloyd Webber, Fred Guinness, The Griz, Greg Nicotero, Cal Solomon, Padre Davide Benvenuto, and Shimmy		
Episode 851: The Avatar Do-Si-Do	2/19/24	Todd Barry; Jessica McKenna as Liz Feigh; Casey Feigh as Bob Feigh; Connor Ratliff as James Cameron; Griffin Newman as Jake Sully		
Episode 852: The Paninis Press	2/26/24	Chris Gethard; Lily Sullivan as Tony Sony; Dan Lippert as Matthew Zimmerman; Hannah Pilkes as Chutney C. Rabbits		
Episode 853: The Calvins Triplets Court Case	3/4/24	Jason Mantzoukas; Taran Killam as Bever Hopox; Paul Brittain as Chico Hands; Ryan Gaul as Bisby St. Hancock		
Episode 854: Snip Snip Sanskrit	3/11/24	Haley Joel Osment; Ryan Rosenberg as Mr. Body; Holly Laurent as Day LaBont		
Episode 855: Crow Court	3/18/24	Jermaine Fowler; Mike Hanford as John Lennon; Ben Rodgers as Magnus Nootropic		
Episode 856: SHAZAM (Stephen Hawking As Zeus And Miss Piggy)	3/25/24	Jon Cryer; Paul F. Tompkins as Al A. Peterson and Fred Guinness; Lamar Woods as Carmine Backontour		
Episode 857: The CBB Roundtable	4/1/24	Ego Nwodim as Pastor Pasta; Matt Apodaca as Albert Roe; Payam Banifaz as Michael Police		
Episode 858: Kink or No Kink	4/4/24	Alex Edelman; Christine Bullen as Misty Civic; Matt Besser as Roger Matthews		
Episode 859: Wet Day Special 2024	4/8/24	Paul F. Tompkins as himself and Brock Lovett; Erin Whitehead as Ursula; Ryan Gaul as Bernie Cutch		
Episode 860: The Letter D	4/15/24	Tatiana Maslany; Edi Patterson as Bean Dip; Carl Tart as Lothario Lewis	Games: Would You Rather?	
Episode 861: KWFZZ: The Fuzz	4/22/24	Todd Glass; Mike Hanford as Dominic Weiss; Gil Ozeri as Mike Stacker		
Episode 862: Cloud Slam	4/29/24	Hannah Einbinder; Bobby Moynihan as The Batmin; Lisa Gilroy as God		
Episode 863: The 15th Anniversary Show!	5/6/24	Jason Mantzoukas; Paul F. Tompkins as Original Fig and Shimmy; Andy Daly as Neptuna and August Lindt; Lily Sullivan as Francesca Bolognese and Carissa; Tim Baltz as Randy Snutz; Shaun Diston as Jeffy McSaturday; Vic Michaelis as Quiet the Mime; Lisa Gilroy as Scott's Nana; Will Hines as The Bronze Boogie Boarder		
Episode 864: Live at the Belasco	5/13/24	Lily Sullivan as Tony Sony; Paul F. Tompkins as Fred Guinness; Claudia O'Doherty; Andy Daly as Chip Gardner; Carl Tart as O.J. Simpson; Tim Baltz as Harry Footman		
Episode 865: Night Night	5/20/24	Nikki Glaser; Paul Scheer as Bartholomew Richard Fitzgerald-Smythe aka Mr. Peanut; Hannah Pilkes as Chase Sapphire		
Episode 866: Buffalo Suede	5/27/24	Natasha Leggero; Seth Morris as Bob Ducca; Jacob Wysocki as The Executioner		
Episode 867: Dork Pranks	6/3/24	Jessica St. Clair as Marissa Wompler; Devin Field as Ron Snapper; Rekha Shankar as Becky Girardi		
Episode 868: Life Is An Opera	6/10/24	Greg Hess as Glen Plapinger; Will Hines as Paul Dudley; Caitlin Reilly as Leanne Lee		
Episode 869: Ganz Stan	6/17/24	Kathleen Madigan; Charlie McCrackin as Detective Jack Cates; James Mannion as Robert Canasta		
Episode 870: E.T. Bikini	6/24/24	Mike Hanford as John Lennon; Vic Michaelis as Jack the Ripper; Zeke Nicholson as Dr. Green		
Episode 871: Good Weddings	7/1/24	Poppy Liu; Suzi Barrett as Donna; Matt Apodaca as Ray Good		
Episode 872: Wolfarangs	7/8/24	Jack Quaid as himself and Janice Dickinson; Tawny Newsome as herself and Escrow Philanthropa; Ben Rodgers as Jack Furz		
Episode 873: You Bet Your Life Twice	7/15/24	Andy Richter; Maria Blasucci as Brand Rollbrone; Amanda Lund as Brock Palmesprings; Jordan Morris as EPT Grizzly		
Episode 874: A Long Time Ago (Downton Abbey Time)	7/22/24	Tony Hale; Paul F. Tompkins as Woolly Doorgosh; Erin Keif as Shirley Macadamia		
Episode 875: Minnie Rifferton	7/29/24	Reggie Watts; Jacob Wysocki as Mr. Toots; Casey Feigh as Weed Seinfeld and Andrew Dice Weed		
Episode 876: The Bear Minimum	8/5/24	Alex Fernie as Robert Caro; Lily Sullivan as The Bear; Hannah Pilkes as Simone		
Episode 877: Impossiblood	8/12/24	Langston Kerman; Will Hines as Alan Freeman; Ronnie Adrian as Kilgorious Van Helsing		
Episode 878: Munich Style	8/19/24	Paul Feig; Christine Bullen as Myrtle McGee; Devin Field as Johnny Manicotti		
Episode 879: Side Duck	8/26/24	Haley Joel Osment; Jon Gabrus as Gino Lombardo; Vic Michaelis as Ember Chuckit		
Episode 880: Rhythem Rhythwe	9/2/24	David Wain; Dave Theune as Alex Rhythms; Rekha Shankar as Barbara		
Episode 881: Two Longlegs Up	9/9/24	Kumail Nanjiani; Taran Killam as Longlegs	Games: Would You Rather?	
Episode 882: It's A.I. All Good	9/16/24	Matt Braunger; Dan Lippert as Seth Berkowitz; Carl Tart as The Pine-Sol Lady		
Episode 883: Goblin Con	9/23/24	Zac Oyama as Crunchkin the Goblin; Erin Keif as Pip Whistle; Will Hines as Billy Sly Car Guy		
Episode 884: The Littlest Wayne	9/30/24	Chuck Bryant; Bobby Moynihan as The Batmin; Holly Laurent as Luanne Lewis		
Episode 885: Badge Off	10/7/24	Max Silvestri; Charlie McCrackin as Inspector Jack Cates; Ryan Rosenberg as Big Mike		
Episode 886: Fyre Can Be Fun	10/14/24	Kristian Bruun; Paul F. Tompkins as Bing Lujo; Vic Michaelis as Hannah Burn		
Episode 887: Bidi Bidi Bugle Boy Bumbalee-Bee	10/21/24	Tatiana Maslany; Kristian Bruun; Paul F. Tompkins as Dr. Bill Blondie; Vic Michaelis as Luzi Brockheimer		
Episode 888: Return to Suicide House: Dom Parasol	10/28/24	Jimmy Pardo; Jon Daly as Buford LeBaron; Ben Rodgers as Raven Maze; Nick Wiger as Satanick Carpazzi		
Episode 889: Every Rock is Gray	11/4/24	Zach Reino as Branessa Whaleslay; Lisa Gilroy as Rockly Mountainrock; Jacquis Neal as Big Momma		
Episode 890: Old Money	11/11/24	James Acaster; Lily Sullivan as Mrs. Lyndhurst; Matt Apodaca as Ricky Johnson		
Episode 891: Pelican Briefcase	11/18/24	Jim O'Heir; Paul Rust as Cecil Sotheby; James Mannion as Chris Orchard		
Episode 892: Cloak of Brown	11/25/24	Mary Elizabeth Ellis; Greg Hess as Glen Plapinger; Madeline Walter as Stephen King		
Episode 893: No Tuxedos	12/2/24	Kyle Mooney as himself and Ian Vanchuri; Will Hines as Bags MK.gee		
Episode 894: Train Perverts	12/9/24	Mekki Leeper; Jon Gabrus as Gino Lombardo; Erin Keif as The Little Engine That Might; Dave Theune as Robby Delmuda		
Episode 895: 2024 Holiday Spectacular	12/16/24	Jason Mantzoukas; Paul F. Tompkins as Hoover Personae; Lauren Lapkus as Ho Ho the Elf; Lily Sullivan as Tony Sony; Shaun Diston as Tony Nails; Vic Michaelis as Terry Alamander; Dan Lippert as Papa Mia; Jessica McKenna as Elsbeth Connors; Will Hines as Glen; Gil Ozeri as DeLuca's Chophouse		
Episode 896: Solo Bolo Ho Ho Holo	12/19/24	Ben Schwartz	Games: Solo Bolo Olympic Song Challenge	
Best of 2024 Part 1	12/23/24	Paul F. Tompkins	14. A Nite-Wolf In Love (Episode 872: Wolfarangs); 13. Don’t Step Where Your Cat Done Shit (Episode 860: The Letter D); 12. Tits & Gunlock (Episode 848: Raisin Kids); 11. The Monster Fuck Part 10: The End (Episode 888: Return to Suicide House: Dom Parasol)	
Best of 2024 Part 2	12/26/24	Paul F. Tompkins	10. Ember Knows Dash For Sure! (Episode 879: Side Duck); 9. The Music Man Saga Begins (Episode 886: Fyre Can Be Fun); 8. The Movie's Based On His Life (Episode 881: Two Longlegs Up); 7. Reasons For The Season (Episode 859: Wet Day Special 2024)	
Best of 2024 Part 3	12/30/24	Paul F. Tompkins	6. Records, Gifts, Twins, & Calls (Episode 843: 2023 Holiday Spectacular); 5. Trial Flashbacks (Episode 853: The Calvins Triplets Court Case); 4. The Music Man Saga Continues (Episode 887: Bidi Bidi Bugle Boy Bumbalee-bee)	

=== 2025 ===
Episode number	Date	Guests	Synopsis and segments	Featured song
Best of 2024 Part 4	1/2/25	Paul F. Tompkins	3. Fig & Neptuna (Episode 863: The 15th Anniversary Show!); 2. Tony SoNY (Episode 845: So New York); 1. Dread Zeppelin (Episode 850: The Exorcism of Hot Dog)	
Episode 897: I Understand	1/6/25	Ben Schwartz; Bobby Moynihan as Slow Pesci; Ryan Gaul as Darryl Day		
Episode 898: Everything's a Hot Dog	1/13/25	Stephanie Hsu; Zosia Mamet; Heather Anne Campbell as Alexa Melrose; Casey Feigh as Joey Salsa		
Episode 899: CBB Presents: The Music Man Watchalong	1/20/25	Paul F. Tompkins as Bing Lujo and Dr. Bill Blondie		
Episode 900: What's Up Cool Cat?	1/27/25	Jason Mantzoukas; Andy Daly as August Lindt, Hot Dog, Cool Cat, and Phil Collins; Paul F. Tompkins as Mason I. Clodge, Ernie Rocks, Lord Andrew Lloyd Webber, Shimmy, Lillian Clodge, Food Court Bailiff, and Studio Bailiff		
Episode 901: Shout Out Shaboozey	2/3/25	Mo Welch; Carl Tart as Deion Sanders; Greg Hess as James "Juvenille Booterie" Armentrout		
Episode 902: Gelsons Ganz	2/10/25	Zach Galifianakis; Charlie McCrackin as Jack Cates; Lisa Gilroy as Shrunkenhead Babywitch, IQ Lady, and Megan Ganz		
Episode 903: That is All	2/17/25	John Hodgman; Connor Ratliff as James Cameron; Griffin Newman as Jake Sully; Patty Guggenheim as Kitty Sea-Joy Sage		
Episode 904: Dr. Hospital, MD: Syringe	2/24/25	Ike Barinholtz; Drew Tarver as Henry Heimlich; Erin Keif as Louie Pantano		
Episode 905: Crumpet Rat	3/3/25	Ione Skye; Alex Fernie as Travis Skin; Rekha Shankar as Doctor Scrumptious		
Episode 906: More Cushion for the Pushin'	3/10/25	Paul F. Tompkins as himself and Ben Jammin; Will Hines as Guy Foreman		
Episode 907: Nasty Boys	3/17/25	Asif Ali; Lily Sullivan as Miss Lacy; Dan Lippert as Russ Saguaro		
Episode 908: Ladies and Gentlemen, Jelly Roll	3/24/25	Hannah Einbinder; Carl Tart as Deion Sanders; Talia Tabin as Abby Spot		
Episode 909: Skinny Chess	3/31/25	Jon Hamm; Seth Morris as Bob Ducca; Shaun Diston as Mike Ruby		
Episode 910: Wet Day Special 2025	4/7/25	Paul F. Tompkins as himself and Spike Minksalmon; Drew Tarver as Ike Minksalmon; Ryan Gaul as Carolyn Parker		
Episode 911: Girl Department	4/14/25	Kelly Marie Tran; Mitra Jouhari as Emily Yeah; James Mannion as Randall Handler		
Episode 912: Who Done It?	4/21/25	Wayne Brady; Lily Sullivan as Krendall; Jacob Wysocki as Bugs Bunny		
Episode 913: Full 360	4/28/25	Tony Hale; Patty Guggenheim as Cruchette Dungan; Ben Rodgers as "The Night Wolf"		
Episode 914: The 16th Anniversary Show!	5/5/25	Jason Mantzoukas; Paul F. Tompkins as Bing Lujo; Ego Nwodim as Pastor Pasta; Jessica McKenna as Bruce Banner/Lil' Hulk; Edi Patterson as Bean Dip; Lily Sullivan as McGarth Darby; Tim Baltz as Harris Teeter; Dan Lippert as Russ Saguaro; Will Hines as Jim Reese; Gil Ozeri as Bitsy Bottom		
Episode 915: Pizza? Pizza... Pizza!	5/12/25	Jon Gabrus as Gino Lombardo; Matt Apodaca as Big Righteous; John Hartman as Laughton Getty		
Episode 916: Scream Time	5/19/25	Sarah Silverman; Erin Keif as Biff Brisket; Talia Tabin as Elsie Lynn		
Episode 917: Wingo Bingo	5/26/25	Nick Kroll; Owen Burke as Bait Turfoil; Hannah Pilkes as Pamela		
Episode 918: Hollyweird	6/2/25	Amita Rao as herself and Midge Sinks; Will Hines as H.M. Rosemont; Casey Feigh as Death		
Episode 919: Knick-Knack Paddy Whack	6/9/25	Karen Gillan; Lily Sullivan as Kitty St. Beauregard; Chris Kleckner as Harley Booth Kid		
Episode 920: No Coconuts Here!	6/16/25	Atsuko Okatsuka; James Austin Johnson as David Fricke; Charlie McCrackin as Ray Szmanda		
Episode 921: The Sweet Spot	6/23/25	Alan Tudyk; Ryan Rosenberg as Landon; Kylie Brakeman as Donna Walkie		
Episode 922: Don't Call Me Daddy	6/30/25	Kerri Kenney-Silver; Dan Lippert as Michael Lindsay-Hogg; Austin Williams as A Mom		
Episode 923: Waymo' Secrets	7/7/25	Jason Mantzoukas; Anna Bezahler as Austin; Isabella Escalante as Tony; Stephanie Burchinow as Kayla; May Darmon as Rupert McDougal		
Episode 924: Zip Your Lip, Eat the Key	7/14/25	Josh Gondelman as himself and Mark Fripp; Vic Michaelis as Ember Chuckit; Zach Reino as Dash Grabum		
Episode 925: Thong Seduction	7/21/25	Andy Samberg; Neil Campbell as Sonny Price; Mitra Jouhari as Elizabeth B****		
Episode 926: May The Labubu Be With You	7/28/25	Mike Mitchell; Shaun Diston as Yoda; Patty Guggenheim as Deb		
Episode 927: 2 Rat 2 Touille	8/4/25	Patton Oswalt; Eddie Pepitone as himself and Kevin Tutulio; Carl Tart as Tootie Rivers and O.J. Simpson; Rekha Shankar as Mumps		
Episode 928: Sixteen Toilets and Another Day Older	8/11/25	Paul F. Tompkins as Dr. Bill Blondie; Andy Daly as Danny Mahoney		
Episode 929: The Monk Chunk	8/18/25	Mike Hanford as Adjacent Mantzoukas and John Lennon; Ele Woods as Signey Gardetto; Fran Gillespie as Tinky Clydesdale		
Episode 930: Skids+	8/25/25	Adam Scott; Dan Gregor as Bob PBS; Doug Mand as Jim Del Monte		
Episode 931: Double Buggle	9/1/25	Kyle Mooney as himself and Brian Buggle; Beck Bennett as himself and Brundan Buggle; Anna Bezahler as Austin; Isabella Escalante as Tony		
Episode 932: Group Soup	9/8/25	Asif Ali; Lily Sullivan as McGarth Darby; Tim Baltz as Harris Teeter; Greg Hess as Glen Plapinger		
Episode 933: Polly Wolly Cule	9/15/25	Lisa Gilroy as Wiz Bang; Jacob Wysocki as Rusty "Hawkeyes" Tutherford; Charlie McCrackin as Burlesque Ives		
Episode 934: Be Our Geft	9/22/25	Gareth Reynolds as himself and Jimmy Buffett; Carl Tart as The Chief; Hannah Pilkes as A Girl Who Had The Craziest Night		
Episode 935: Bone-In Salami Sliders	9/29/25	Jason Mantzoukas; Seth Morris as Bob Ducca; May Darmon as Peter Streusel; Owen Burke as Queasy Jeans		
Episode 936: The Bat Emoji and The Eggplant Emoji	10/6/25	Paul F. Tompkins as Burnt Millipede; Kylie Brakeman as Ellen Dracula; Brett Morris as Doug Pedestrian; Nicole Parker as Joan Pedestrian		
Episode 937: A Segway Three Way	10/13/25	Adam Pally; Rekha Shankar as Barbara Toadfelson; Casey Feigh as Bort McSpoon		
Episode 938: Can A Bird Do A Foxtrot?	10/20/25	Martin Starr; Erin Keif as Louie Pantano; Jon Mackey as Dr. Reginald Barbary		
Episode 939: Come On Baby, Shoot That Conga	10/27/25	Phoebe Robinson; Vic Michaelis as Eig de'Ouef; Dave Theune as Dunno		
Episode 940: I Can't Chase 55s	11/3/25	Max Silvestri; Gabe Liedman; Will Hines as Ethan Merc; Ben Rodgers as Arnaud DeBeaubeau		
Episode 941: Ankling Scooby Don't	11/10/25	Edgar Wright; Edi Patterson as Bean Dip; Neil Campbell as Redd Velvet		
Episode 942: Why Do You Want To Hack In The Back?	11/17/25	Mary Elizabeth Ellis; Dan Lippert as Bill Walton; Patty Guggenheim as Cruchette Dungan; Andres Parada as Lotto Bosko		
Episode 943: A Banana Peel Memory	11/24/25	Myq Kaplan; Paul Rust as Teddy Today; James Mannion as Hube Wheeler, Esq.		
Episode 944: Bones Are Important	12/1/25	Kumail Nanjiani; Will Hines as Wyatt Malibu; Charlie McCrackin as Jack Cates		
Episode 945: Help Me Rhombus	12/8/25	Carl Tart as O.J. Simpson; Angela Giarratana as Angus Montgomery Diana; Alex Fernie as The Flasher Gremlin		
Episode 946: 2025 Holiday Spectacular	12/15/25	Jason Mantzoukas; Paul F. Tompkins as RFK Jr., Santa Claus, The Worm, and Shimmy; Lily Sullivan as Krendall; Anna Bezahler as Austin; Isabella Escalante as Tony; Dan Lippert as Soupsa Claus; Lauren Lapkus as Ho Ho the Elf; Gil Ozeri as DeLuca's Chophouse		
Best of 2025 Part 1	12/21/25	Paul F. Tompkins	14. Blondie & Mahoney (Episode 928: Sixteen Toilets And Another Day Older); 13. Asif Ali Makes A Promise, Innies/Outies, and Watermen (Episode 907: Nasty Boys); 12. Jack Cates Returns (Episode 902: Gelsons Ganz); 11. Foods Bob Ducca Ate (Episode 935: Bone-In Salami Sliders)	
Best of 2025 Part 2	12/24/25	Paul F. Tompkins	10. Asif Ali Breaks A Promise (Episode 932: Group Soup); 9. Coach Prime & Dawgs (Episode 901: Shout Out Shaboozey); 8. Bob Ducca’s Health Regimen (Episode 909: Skinny Chess); 7. DJ’s, Cowboys, and Burl Ives (Episode 933: Polly Wolly Cule)	
Best of 2025 Part 3	12/28/25	Paul F. Tompkins	6. You have selected: LEMON FIFERS! (Episode 895: 2024 Holiday Spectacular); 5. www.cooldickshoes.com (Episode 923: Waymo’ Secrets); 4. How Many Alarms You Got? (Episode 914: The 16th Anniversary Show)	

=== 2026 ===
Episode number	Date	Guests	Synopsis and segments	Featured song
Best of 2025 Part 4	1/1/26	Paul F. Tompkins	3. Krendall Loves Her Boys (Episode 912: Who Done It?); 2. The Minksalmons Return (Episode 910: Wet Day Special 2025); 1. Pentatonix or Rockapella? (Episode 900: What’s Up Cool Cat?)	
Episode 947: Crust Is Gutters, Undercarriage Is Grundle	1/5/26	Ben Schwartz; Ryan Gaul as Chave Portnoy; Gil Ozeri as Dr. Sweetchat 2.0		
Episode 948: A Coy Boy and a Soy Boy	1/12/26	Tatiana Maslany; Tawny Newsome as herself and The Hollywood Sign; Carl Tart as Barry White and Mayor Karen Bass		
Episode 949: A Thanator Around Your Neck	1/19/26	Anna Konkle; Griffin Newman as Jake Sully; Connor Ratliff as James Cameron; Anna Bezahler as Leaf Clover		
Episode 950: Malt Shop Dementia	1/26/26	Jason Mantzoukas; Andy Daly as Ben Alterman, Hot Dog, and Neptuna; Paul F. Tompkins as Bing Lujo and Original Fig		
Episode 951: Dudes Rock!	2/2/26	May Darmon as Rupert McDougal; Matt Apodaca as Duke Nukem; Angela Giarratana as Chris Thomas		
Episode 952: The Shoe of the Summer Is Flip Flop	2/9/26	Todd Glass; Charlie McCrackin as Mr. Gunlock; Stephanie Burchinow as Charlene LeTruck		
Episode 953: Money Come On Paper	2/16/26	Dan Mangan; Heather Anne Campbell as Resident Evil Merchant; Austin Williams as Lloyd Martin	Games: Would You Rather?	"Diminishing Returns" by Dan Mangan "Goodbye America" by Dan Mangan "I Hated Love Songs" by Dan Mangan
Episode 954: I'll Allow It, B00bs	2/23/26	Silversun Pickups; Will Hines as B00bs Rinse; Isabella Escalante as Terry Porch		"New Wave" by Silversun Pickups "The Wreckage" by Silversun Pickups "Long Gone" by Silversun Pickups
Episode 955: Chauncy, Chauncy, Where Did Your Leotard Go?	2/26/26	Armen Weitzman as himself and Frankie Forkson; Paul Rust as himself and Benny Bachelor; Neil Campbell as Barrett Bachelor		
Episode 956: Tony! Tony! Tony!	3/2/26	Paul F. Tompkins as Alimony Tony, Alan Cumming, and Ameliano; Lily Sullivan as Tony Sony, AI, and Tony Danza; Shaun Diston as Room Tone Tony and Tony Danza		
Episode 957: A Four Tampon Polycule	3/9/26	D'Arcy Carden; Carl Tart as Ted Ready; Erin Keif as Puddlesby Bridgerton		
Episode 958: Smut, Meme, Sting	3/16/26	Langston Kerman; Patty Guggenheim as Gwymper Sanbag; Neil Campbell as Willie Ward		
Episode 959: Bever's Yuk-Em-Ups with The Calvins Triplets	3/23/26	Jason Mantzoukas; Taran Killam as Bever Hopox, Louis Armstrong, Brian Cox, Christoph Waltz, Bruce Springsteen, Wise Benedict, and Security Guard #1; Paul Brittain as Chico Hands, Brad Pitt, Neve Campbell, Robert Smith, Bill Nye, and Security Guard #2; Ryan Gaul as Bisby St. Hancock and Cary Grant		
Episode 960: Blind Is Love	3/30/26	Nick Kocher; Brian McElhaney; Hannah Pilkes as The Nurse From The Pitt; Casey Feigh as Weed Seinfeld		
Episode 961: Wet Day 2026	4/6/26	Paul F. Tompkins as himself and Spike Minksalmon; Drew Tarver as Ike Minksalmon; Ryan Gaul as Carolyn Parker		
Episode 962: Peg Is Your Pig	4/13/26	Jimmy Pardo; May Darmon as Pearl Corgette; Joe Wengert as Greg Amenay		
Episode 963: Kushmageddon	4/20/26	Simon Helberg; Lily Sullivan as Johhhana Goines; Jacob Wysocki as Mr. Toots		
Episode 964: Doula On The Dumbo	4/27/26	David Dastmalchian; Kylie Brakeman as Didi; James Mannion as Lyle Vanity		
Episode 965: The 17th Anniversary Show!	5/4/26	Lisa Gilroy as Nana Aukerman; Shaun Diston as Yoda; Paul F. Tompkins as Seals; Edi Patterson as Bean Dip; Dan Lippert as Bill Walton; Will Hines as B00bs Rinse; Isabella Escalante as Tony; Anna Bezahler as Austin		
Episode 966: She's Back, Back in the MCU	5/11/26	Tatiana Maslany; Dave Theune as Robby Delmuda; Stephanie Burchinow as Starbucks Egg Bite		
Episode 967: Pulling A Eugene Mirman	5/18/26	Eugene Mirman; Will Hines as Devin Greenlove; Erin Keif as Louie Pantano		
Episode 968: Name A More Iconic Ocho	5/25/26	Asif Ali; Lily Sullivan as McGarth Darby; Tim Baltz as Harris Teeter; Shaun Diston as Mike Ruby		
Episode 969: Raw Dogging Coke	6/1/26	Kerri Kenney-Silver; Devin Field as Zander Holyfield; Stephanie Burchinow as Darbara Meatbag		
Episode 970: Poop Doula	6/8/26	Ed Helms; Seth Morris as Bob Ducca; Isabella Escalante as Paulina		
Episode 971: Freddy Krueger Taint	6/15/26	Kevin Nealon; Charlie McCrackin as Jeffrey Epstein; Chris Kleckner as Lob Donaldson		
Episode 972: Sublime-a With Roma	6/22/26	Rachel Wolfson; Ben Rodgers as Tyler, Your Girl's New Friend; John Hartman as Terry Schiavo		
Episode 973: Zombily, USA	6/29/26	Erinn Hayes; May Darmon as DJ Dead Poisson; Owen Burke as Craig		
Episode 974: Wainscotting With Hamm On The Side	7/6/26	Jon Hamm; David Wain; Lily Sullivan as Petey Tucson; Ryan Gaul as Peter Tucson; Carl Tart as Deion Sanders		
Episode 975: Tooth Hings	7/13/26	Jason Mantzoukas; Paul F. Tompkins as Dave Blynn and Shimmy; Andy Daly as August Lindt		
Episode 976: The Gun Is A Pie	7/20/26	Dan Mintz; Charlie McCrackin as Ali G/Albert Ganz and Jack Cates; Patty Guggenheim as Suzanne Gucci		
Episode 977: Goomi Turned the Mustard Green	7/27/26	Sean Clements; May Darmon as Helga; Matt Apodaca as Duke Nukem		
Episode 978: I Think We Ate the Dogs	8/3/26	Angela Giarratana as Chloe Carr; Jim Woods as Jake Gargello; Greg Hess as Captain Elwes Davies		
Episode 979: Wainscotting, Hold the Hamm	8/10/26	David Wain; James Mannion as Lonnie Portapotti; Isabella Escalante as Terry Porch		
Episode 980: Shine the Vinyl	8/17/26	Kristian Bruun; Lily Sullivan as Kayla Dickie; Emily Pendergast as C.J. Lowry		
Episode 981: Pordlandia	8/24/26	Fred Armisen; Carrie Brownstein; Will Hines as B00bs Rinse; Erin Keif as Bunny LaRue		
Episode 982: Jackman Backman	8/31/26	Asif Ali; Dan Lippert as Bill Walton; Stephanie Burchinow as Caroline Fingers		
Episode 983: Chipmunk Scream Queen	9/7/26	Patty Guggenheim as P*nise Grunch; Alex Fernie as Dave Seville; May Darmon as George Theragun		
Episode 984: Male Loneliness Empanada	9/14/26	Mark Duplass; Devin Field as Zander Holyfield; Casey Feigh as Greg of Galilee		
Episode 985: The Song of the Guyren	9/21/26	Lauren Lapkus as herself and Momo; Brian Posehn; John Gemberling as Demetrius; Owen Burke as Yule Tannenbaum		
Episode 986: Spank of America	9/28/26	Lisa Gilroy as herself and Cockroach Rick; Zac Oyama as Criminy From Coople Street; Angela Giarratana as Jersey Mike		
Episode 987: A Bit of the Bigfoot Experience	10/5/26	Arturo Castro; Zeke Nicholson as Klaus Schmidt; Mike Castle as Thandie Newman		
Episode 988: The Maids Are Frankensteins	10/12/26	Domhnall Gleeson; Griffin Newman as Chuckslatly Slatty; Kylie Brakeman as Johnny Spiderwebs		
Episode 989: Why Shammy Hates Shimmy	10/19/26	Oscar Nunez; Paul F. Tompkins as Shammy and Shimmy; Anna Bezahler as Claude Shapiro		
Episode 990: The Sneeze Yard	10/26/26	Chloe Radcliffe; Mike Hanford as Adjacent Mantzoukas; Ryan Rosenberg as Jax K-9		
Episode 991: Gentleman Ipulation	11/2/26	Punkie Johnson; Will Hines as Striker John; Isabella Escalante as Mackin Berrycloth		
Episode 992: I Got Pilates In The Divorce	11/9/26	Ron Funches; Jacob Wysocki as Frank Rightatcha; Amanda Lehan as Rita Roots		

== Reception ==
Comedy Bang! Bang! has been critically acclaimed. In 2011 Entertainment Weekly described it as "Often strange, consistently hilarious, always unpredictable." In the same year it featured on Rolling Stone's "10 Best Comedy Podcasts of the Moment".

The A.V. Club says "The guests are routinely top-notch, the show has a de facto company of ace improvisers enlivening each episode, and Scott Aukerman is a gleefully indulgent host", also saying "For comedy fans, Comedy Bang Bang is essential listening." It frequently appeared in the Podmass column, highlighting the best podcasts of each week, and the website named Comedy Bang! Bang! the best podcast of 2013.

"It's perhaps the easiest show to single out as a juggernaut; the podcast is ten years in with over 600 episodes, a testament to creator Scott Aukerman's unparalleled collaboration prowess." — Vulture

The show won in the Comedy category at the 2015 and 2017 Academy of Podcasters Awards.

== See also ==
- Comedy Death-Ray

== Footnotes ==
- ^{a} The "Closing Up the Plugbag" closing theme (the Ken Marino, Steve Agee & Casey Wilson version used from 2012 to 2015) featured a growing number of ending tags by Adam Pally, Brendon Small and Paul F. Tompkins.
- ^{a} Since 2016, Ben Schwartz (and previously Horatio Sanz) have recorded a new "Closing Up the Plugbag" theme during the first episode each year. That theme (or a remix created by a listener) is then used for the rest of the year. It has occasionally included audio contributions from Jason Mantzoukas, expressing his disdain for the closing theme as it occurs.
