= Sexpot Comedy =

American comedy collective

- Sexpot Comedy Logo
- Industry: Digital & live entertainment
- Founded: July 2012
- Headquarters: Denver, Colorado, United States
- Key people: Kayvan Soorena Tyler Khalatbari-Limaki and Andy Juett

Sexpot Comedy is a comedy collective, producing or sponsoring nine podcasts and more than a dozen weekly or monthly live events in Denver, Colorado. It is run by partners Kayvan Soorena Tyler Khalatbari-Limaki (Kayvan Khalatbari), a local entrepreneur, and Andy Juett, a local comedian and producer.

== History ==
In July 2012, Khalatbari combined two of his existing businesses—Sexy Pizza, a Denver-based pizza chain, and Denver Relief, one of Colorado's oldest marijuana dispensaries—to create a comedy showcase called Sexpot Comedy. Staged in one of Sexy Pizza's three locations, these invite-only stand-up shows allowed Denver Relief's medical marijuana patients to smoke while watching sets from some of Denver's comedians.

Shortly after the launch, Juett joined on as a producing partner of Sexpot. Along with the namesake showcase, the Sexpot brand started sponsoring four Denver podcasts (all hosted or co-hosted by area comedians), and several local comedy festivals, open mics, and special events. The brand has since expanded and launched their website in October 2014 which features their network of podcasts and a show calendar.

== Podcasts ==
=== Featured Podcasts ===
As of October 2014, Sexpot Comedy sponsors six featured podcasts and three up-and-coming podcasts in their farm league:

==== My Dining Room Table ====
Denver comedian Adam Cayton-Holland interviews a variety of people who cross his path in this biweekly podcast. While the format is informal and conversational, topics usually revolve about the guest's route to success and the various interpretations of what "making it" means. Past guests include T.J. Miller, The Sklar Brothers, and Colorado Governor John Hickenlooper. The podcast's name comes from the fact that most of the interviews happen at Cayton-Holland's dining room table.

==== Grabbing Lunch with Matt Knudsen ====
Matt Knudsen started the Grabbing Lunch podcast to try to give listeners a fly on the wall experience as comedians, actors and artists literally sit down and casually chat over a mid-day meal.

==== The Narrators ====
Hosted by Denver comedian Andrew Orvedahl and Robert Rutherford, The Narrators is a live monthly storytelling project with select stories captured and released as a podcast. The monthly show, staged at Denver's Buntport Theater invites artists, actors, comedians and the general public to tell a story based on a single theme. In July 2014, Rutherford moved to San Diego, where he intends to expand the live show and podcast.

==== The Unicorn ====
Host Andrew Orvedahl interviews local and national comedians about sex and relationships.

==== These Things Matter ====
Denver comedian Kevin O'Brien and Taylor Gonda host this weekly podcast in which guests talk about "pop culture, autobiographically." Denver-centric celebrities and visiting comedians, musicians and artists discuss one pop culture topic that impacted their life. The podcast won Westword's Best Podcast Denver Award 2014.

==== Whiskey and Cigarettes ====
Hosted by local comedians Jake Becker, Jake Browne, and Zac Maas, Whiskey and Cigarettes is a podcast about other podcasts. The weekly show features local and national comedy guests who join the hosts to talk about highlights from other podcasts from the previous week. The podcast won Readers' Choice in Westword's Best Podcast Denver Award 2014.

=== Farm League Podcasts ===
==== Werewolf Radar ====
A comedic exploration of the paranormal, Werewolf Radar is a weekly podcast hosted by Denver comedians Nate Balding, Roger Norquist, Sam Tallent, and Jordan Doll (who also produces and records the podcast). In addition to touring to record live from purportedly haunted venues and having local bar (and regular host of the podcast) El Charrito name a drink in the podcast's honor, there is a new monthly event at Roostercat Coffee House called Werewolf Radar Picture Show, combining screenings of monster movies with a showcase of local comedic talent.

==== The Other Side ====
Hosted by Bradley Haltom and Micah Carmack, The Other Side is a comedy showcase, followed by a live podcast with a question and answer session with the showcase comedians. Housed at Denver's Voodoo Comedy Playhouse, The Other Side encourages the live audience and Twitter followers to submit questions.

==== Empty Girlfriend ====
Empty Girlfriend is a podcast for love quips and life tips from Haley Driscoll and Christie Buchele.

== Sexpot's Monthly Showcase ==
The showcase evolved from the first shows held as invite-only parties inside a Sexy Pizza, and moved to the Oriental Theater in December, 2013. The larger iteration of the show has featured guests including: Rory Scovel, Sean Patton, Nikki Glaser, Andy Kindler, and LA comedy group WOMEN, as well as local talent. Comedy Works New Faces winner Jordan Doll hosts and Juett produces the events.

Hosted by Jordan Doll and Andy Juett, every monthly showcase also features pre-show activity during Sexpot Vision with Jim Hickox.

=== Weirdo Olympics ===
February 28, 2014 with Nikki Glaser, David Gborie, Ben Kronberg, Sam Tallent and Kevin O'Brien

=== Vernal Equinox ===
March 21, 2014 with Rory Scovel, Chris Fairbanks, Andrew Orvedahl, Kristin Rand, and Chris Charpentier

=== Midnight Run ===
April 17, 2014 with Andy Haynes, Billy Wayne Davis, Nathan Lund, Noah Gardenswartz, Ian Douglas Terry, and Nathan Lund

=== Sexpot American Summer ===
May 30, 2014 with Andy Kindler, Chuck Roy, Bobby Crane, Christie Buchele, and Mara Wiles. Hosted by Alex Falcone.

=== WOMEN: Sexpot in the City ===
June 21, 2014 with Jake Weisman, Dave Ross, Pat Bishop, and Allen Strickland Williams

=== High Plains Comedy Festival Preview ===
July 18, 2014 with Aparna Nancherla, Ashley Barnhill, Sean Patton, and Ian Douglas Terry

=== Sexpot at the 2nd Annual High Plains Comedy Festival ===
August 22, 2014 with Kumail Nanjiani, Chris Fairbanks, The Walsh Brothers, Andy Haynes, Billy Wayne Davis, and Eugene Cordero

=== Sexpot's Aerial Menagerie ===
September 19, 2014 with Dan St. Germain, David Huntsberger, Brock Wilbur, Haley Driscoll, and Jay Gillespie

=== Sexpot's Selfie Showcase ===
October 24, 2014 with Hampton Yount, Drennon Davis, Sammy Arechar, Anthony Crawford, and Aaron Urist

== Recurring Live Shows ==
In addition to the podcasts and their live components, the Sexpot brand sponsors or produces more than a dozen regular live shows around Denver. As of October 2014, those include:

=== Boulder Comedy Show ===
Hosted at Boulder's Bohemian Biergarten by comic Brent Gill, the Boulder Comedy Show is the city's only free weekly showcase. Featuring comedians from around the Denver metro area and country.

=== Cartoons and Comedy ===
Organizer Christopher Baker brings three local comedians together for a live commentary of Saturday morning cartoons and commercials of the '80s and '90s. Sexpot also provides cereal and milk for the audience to better capture the Saturday morning nostalgia.

=== Comics Against Civility ===
Hosted by Jake Browne and Zac Maas, this game show is a spin on the Cards Against Humanity board game. Panels of local comedians create their own "answer" cards in advance, and audience members submit the "questions." The comedians then choose from their own cards, with the audience's reaction choosing the winner of each round.

=== Crom Comedy Festival ===
An annual alternative stand-up comedy festival that started in Omaha, Nebraska in 2013 and added a second festival in Denver in 2015. Curated by Ian Douglas Terry, Andy Juett, and Zach Reinert. Former headliners include Howard Kremer, Ron Funches, Sean Patton, The Grawlix, Rory Scovel, Kyle Kinane, Ben Kronberg, and Brooks Wheelan.

=== Doom Room ===
Recent Omaha transplants (and now Denver-based) comedians Zach Reinert and Ian Douglas Terry host this monthly show at 3 Kings Tavern. Local and touring comedians perform stand-up sets on the fly based on topics that pop up on the patented "Screen of Doom".

=== Governor Jack Watches You While You Sleep ===
Comedy troupe Governor Jack—one of the longest-running improv and sketch comedy groups in Denver—interviews a visiting improviser before improvising scenes based on the interview answers. Staged at Denver's Voodoo Comedy Playhouse.

=== Greater Than Social Club ===
Produced in conjunction with Illegal Pete's Greater Than Collective label, Greater Than Social Club is a modern-day, monthly cabaret-style show at Denver's Lannie's Clocktower. The show combines local and national comedians with alternative bands and is hosted by comedian Kristin Rand.

=== High Plains Comedy Festival ===
High Plains Comedy Festival is a comedy festival held each August in Denver. Founded in 2013, it is organized by Denver comedian/writer Adam Cayton-Holland and Sexpot partner Juett, and features a mix of local and national comics in venues throughout the Baker neighborhood.

=== Lucha Libre & Laughs ===
This blend of Mexican wrestling and comedy is produced and refereed by comedian and filmmaker Nick Gossert at the Oriental Theater. Local comedians perform stand-up sets before providing color commentary of live pro-wrestling matches.

=== Offensively Delicious ===
An annual kick-off event for Great American Beer Festival, Offensively Delicious features unlimited tastings from ten breweries as well as comedy from both the brewers themselves and two comedians.

The 2014 edition featured Nikki Glaser and Adam Cayton-Holland

=== The Other Side Podcast Live! ===
A live edition of Bradley Haltom's Other Side Podcast, held every month at Voodoo Comedy Playhouse.

=== Propaganda! ===
Host/producer Matt Monroe puts on this monthly showcase at Lannie's Clocktower Cabaret. The show is totally free and regularly features a combination of local and national comedians. The show was named Best Comedy Night in Westword's Best of Denver Award 2014.

=== Sexpot Open Mic ===
Host Jeff M. Albright hosts this standup comedy open mic at Goosetown Tavern every Monday night.

=== Too Much Fun! ===
The Fine Gentleman's Club (FGC)—consisting of Denver comedians Chris Charpentier, Bobby Crane, Nathan Lund, and Sam Tallent—hosts this free weekly showcase at Denver's Deer Pile performance space. The FGC introduce each show and perform individual standup between their guests' sets. Past guests have included Brooks Wheelan, Jules Posner, Josh Blue, and Dave Chappelle.

=== Too Much Funstival ===
The Fine Gentleman's Club has also put on a loosely organized comedy festival in the fall annually since 2011. The festival mainly consists of local comedians and bands performing at small venues in the Capitol Hill and RiNo neighborhoods.
