= The Narrators =

Monthly True Storytelling Show and Podcast

- Other names: The Narrators Denver, The Narrators Podcast
- Genre: Storytelling
- Running time: 10-20 minutes
- Country of origin: United States
- Language: English
- Hosted by: Ron S. Doyle & Erin Rollman
- Created by: Andrew Orvedahl
- Produced by: Ron S. Doyle
- Original release: 2010 – present
- No. of episodes: 264 (as of July 2023)
- Website: The Narrators site
- Podcast: The Narrators podcast

The Narrators is a monthly true storytelling show and podcast from Denver, Colorado, hosted by standup comedian Andrew Orvedahl, Ron S. Doyle and Buntport Theater's Erin Rollman.

== Live event ==
The monthly show takes place every third Wednesday of the month at Buntport Theater in Denver. The Narrators also hosts a variety of special events in partnership with other organizations.

In 2019, The Narrators was named "Best Storytelling Show" in Westword's Best of Denver awards.

== Podcast ==
The Narrators produces a weekly companion podcast that features selected stories from the show's live events. The podcast was named one of "Ten Essential Denver Podcasts" by Westword in 2016 and one of "9 Essential Denver Podcasts You Should Be Listening To" by 303 Magazine in 2019. As of 2021, the podcast is produced by Ron S. Doyle, Karen Wachtel, Scott Carney, Jessi Whitten, and Sydney Crain.

In 2022, the podcast was named "Best Podcast" in Westword's Best of Denver awards.

== History ==
The live show was created by Orvedahl in 2010, originally staged at the now-defunct Paris on the Platte cafe and bar. In 2012, the show relocated to the Deer Pile community space, added musician and writer Robert Rutherford as co-host, and launched a podcast produced by Doyle. In 2014, the show relocated to Buntport Theater, where it has remained since.

Rutherford moved to San Diego in late 2014, where he launched a monthly sister show with co-host Mary Robertson, as well as a multilingual spin-off series in Tijuana, México. When Orvedahl left the Denver show in March 2015 to star in the television sitcom Those Who Can't, Doyle and Rollman took over as hosts.

During the COVID-19 pandemic, the show shifted to virtual shows and outdoor performances at the EXDO Events Center in Denver.

== Notable performers ==
- Adam Cayton-Holland
- Alex Landau
- Alexander Chee
- Alice Gillette
- Amber Tozer
- Andrew Orvedahl
- Aparna Nancherla
- Baron Vaughn
- Ben Roy
- Beth Stelling
- Cameron Esposito
- Candi CdeBaca
- Chris Fairbanks
- Chris Garcia
- Dave Ross
- David Gborie
- Dessa
- Dr. Kevin Fitzgerald
- Drennon Davis
- Flobots
- Hutch Harris
- Jordan Temple
- Josh Blue
- Ken Arkind
- Kyle Kinane
- Lonnie MF Allen
- Magic Cyclops
- Maria Thayer
- Matt Braunger
- Milk Blossoms
- Porlolo
- R. Alan Brooks
- Ramon Rivas
- Rick Griffith
- Ron Lynch
- Sean Patton
- Sonya Eddy
- Stephen Graham Jones
- The Nix Bros.
- Whitmer Thomas
- Yvie Oddly
