= Andy Juett =

American actor & stand-up comedian

- Born: October 24, 1977 (age 48)
- Children: 2

Comedy career
- Genre: Alternative comedy

Andy Juett (born October 24, 1977) is an American actor, stand-up comedian, writer, producer, host, and comedy event director in Denver, Colorado. He is a partner in Sexpot Comedy and was one of the co-founders of High Plains Comedy Festival.

== Early life and education ==
Originally from Bloomfield Hills, Michigan, Juett graduated from Brother Rice High School, where he attended alongside fellow comedian and future collaborator Eugene Cordero. Juett briefly attended Boston College before graduating from Michigan State University with a degree in advertising.

== Career ==
=== Radio ===
Juett spent more than 14 years in the radio industry, working as an Account Executive at Liggett Broadcasting in Lansing, Michigan and Citadel in Colorado Springs, moving into sales management positions at Max Radio, CBS Radio, Wilks Broadcasting, and Clear Channel Radio in Denver and ultimately serving as Sales Manager at Lincoln Financial Media's Comedy 103.1 from September 2013 through June 2014.

=== Producing ===
Juett is a producer of comedy content including live comedy shows, web videos, and an Amazon.com sitcom pilot.

In addition to co-owning Sexpot Comedy, Juett has produced events in the past such as High Plains Comedy Festival (see below), The Grapes of Rad Comedy Show (a former monthly comedy show at Englewood's Gothic Theatre produced in collaboration with Adam Cayton-Holland, Andrew Orvedahl, and Ben Roy of The Grawlix comedy trio) and The Grawlix's monthly show at the Bug Theatre. He joined with filmmaking team The Nix Brothers to produce comedian T.J. Miller's music video "Denver" (a track off of Miller's "Extended Play E.P.").

Juett also teamed up with The Grawlix and The Nix Brothers to produce an Amazon sitcom pilot in June 2012 called Those Who Can't, about three inept Denver high school teachers. It starred The Grawlix in the three main roles, along with Rory Scovel, Kyle Kinane, and Nikki Glaser.

=== Comedy Performances ===
Juett regularly performs stand-up in Denver showcases and events and was accepted into Crom Comedy Festival in Omaha and the Comedy Exposition of 2014 in Chicago.

In 2012, Juett, Orvedahl and Robert Rutherford formed Mouthstepperz, an a cappella dubstep team (Juett's "Clownmouth" was the "lead singer"). They performed at SXSW in 2013 and made an appearance at the 2013 High Plains Comedy Festival. Juett has also appeared in numerous videos featured on Funny or Die including multiple episodes of the Grawlix/Nix Bros. web series and fake commercials for Omaha's Crom Comedy Fest. He starred in a web series called Glenn Has Ideas which featured special guests including Adam Cayton-Holland, Rory Scovel, Sean Patton, Emily Heller, Dan Soder, Chris Fairbanks and Hannah Duggan.

=== Sexpot Comedy ===
Juett is a producing partner in Sexpot Comedy. Originally conceived as a private comedy showcase by Denver entrepreneur Kayvan S.T. Khalatbari, Sexpot served as a comedy collective, producing or sponsoring four podcasts and a dozen weekly or monthly live events. Among these was the main monthly Sexpot Comedy show, held at Denver's historic Oriental Theater, which Juett produced. Combining national headliners (including Rory Scovel, Sean Patton, Nikki Glaser and Andy Kindler) with local talent (Comedy Works New Faces winner Jordan Doll as host), the show regularly included free pizza coupons from Khalatbari's Sexy Pizza, and was "semi-pot-friendly" due to its tie with Khalatbari's former marijuana dispensary, Denver Relief. The combination of these businesses is where Sexpot's name originated.

Juett also oversaw SexpotComedy.com, which launched in 2014, publishing original content in the form of comedy podcasts, videos, and literature, similar to Nerdist Industries or Earwolf. At the time, it featured a comprehensive calendar of Denver's ever-expanding lineup of comedy events.

In 2018, Sexpot hosted the Denver premiere of the film Super Troopers 2, which featured special appearances by cast members Kevin Heffernan, Steve Lemme, and Paul Soter. The event was a tribute to the film's connection to Sexpot Comedy, as Juett and Khalatbari "kept the production afloat during a troublesome shoot."

=== High Plains Comedy Festival ===
In 2013, Juett partnered with Denver comedian/writer Adam Cayton-Holland to launch the High Plains Comedy Festival. Juett parted ways with the festival in 2015, after its third year.

== Personal life ==
Juett has two children: a daughter and a son and currently resides in Parker, Colorado.
