= Ron S. Doyle =

American podcast producer and editor

Ron S. Doyle is an American producer and podcaster based in Denver, Colorado. He is the producer and co-host of The Narrators, a monthly live storytelling show and podcast, and as of October 2026 was the director of podcast production at the investigative news outlet The Lever.

Doyle worked as a high school teacher before becoming a freelance writer and editor in 2008. He joined The Narrators as its podcast producer in 2012 and became a co-host in 2014, the same year he co-produced The Narrators: Second Listen, a series about storytelling for Colorado Public Radio.

He volunteered at the first High Plains Comedy Festival in 2013 and later served as its tech and venue manager until the festival's end in 2026. Westword named him on its "100 Colorado Creatives" list in 2016. He has produced The Grawlix Saves the World, a comedy podcast hosted by Adam Cayton-Holland, Andrew Orvedahl and Ben Roy that debuted in 2020, and comedian Louis Katz's 2023 stand-up special Present/Tense. At The Lever, he was the editor of the investigative podcast Master Plan, which received the 2025 National Press Club Award for audio journalism.
