= Eugene Cordero =

American comedian and actor (born 1978)

- Cordero at Dragon Con in 2026
- Born: July 18, 1978 (age 48); Detroit, Michigan, U.S.
- Education: Brother Rice High School
- Occupations: Comedian; actor; writer
- Years active: 1998–present
- Spouse: Tricia McAlpin (m. 2011)
- Children: 2

Eugene Cordero (born July 18, 1978) is an American comedian, actor, and writer. Frequently appearing in comedic roles, he has been featured as a series regular on the comedies Other Space (2015), Bajillion Dollar Propertie$ (2017–2019), Tacoma FD (2019–2021), and Star Trek: Lower Decks (2020–2024). His television appearances also include recurring roles on House of Lies (2014), Crazy Ex-Girlfriend (2015–2017), The Good Place (2016–2020), and Wrecked (2018). Outside of comedy, he was a series regular on the Disney+ series Loki (2021–2023). Cordero's film roles include the comedy-drama The Kings of Summer (2013), the monster adventure Kong: Skull Island (2017), and the crime drama The Mule (2018).

== Early life and education ==
Cordero grew up in the northern suburbs of Detroit. He graduated from Brother Rice High School in 1996. He later moved to New York City to attend Marymount Manhattan College.

He began improv with Chicago City Limits before taking classes at Upright Citizens Brigade and performing as a member of ASSSSCAT.

== Career ==
Cordero has worked largely in comedy, appearing in such televisions shows as Drunk History, Kroll Show, Silicon Valley, The Office, Brooklyn Nine-Nine, Bajillion Dollar Propertie$, Veep, The Good Place, and Crazy Ex-Girlfriend. Cordero landed a guest role on Hawaii Five-0 after making a sketch about the show's lack of diversity. Cordero was one of the main characters in Yahoo!'s 2015 sci-fi comedy series Other Space. In 2019, Cordero began a starring role on Tacoma FD and made an appearance on The Mandalorian. In April 2021, it was announced that he would be joining the cast of the Disney+ series Loki. In season 2, it was revealed that his character Casey was a temporal variant of bank robber and Alcatraz escapee Frank Morris.

Beginning in 2013, Cordero voiced Jamie in the Cartoon Network series Steven Universe. He also voiced Sawyer D. and Brian on Bob's Burgers. He voices Lieutenant junior grade Sam Rutherford on Star Trek: Lower Decks, which premiered in 2020.

Cordero has appeared in films such as Mike and Dave Need Wedding Dates, Kong: Skull Island, The Kings of Summer, and Ghostbusters.

Cordero has appeared several times on the Comedy Bang! Bang! podcast and television series. Cordero is the co-host of a fitness podcast with Ryan Stanger called The Dumbbells.

Cordero has appeared as a panelist on National Public Radio's "Wait Wait... Don't Tell Me!".

== Personal life ==
Cordero is of Filipino descent. He lives in Los Angeles. Cordero was a high school classmates of comedian Andy Juett at Brother Rice High School in Michigan, with whom he later collaborated at Sexpot Comedy. Cordero is married to comedy writer Tricia McAlpin. They have two children.

== Filmography ==
=== Film ===
Year	Title	Role	Notes
2010	When in Rome	Poker Player #2	
2010	Furry Vengeance	Cheese	
2013	The Kings of Summer	Colin	
2013	Afternoon Delight	Bobby	
2014	Our RoboCop Remake	Scientist	Segment: "Scene 20"
2016	Mike and Dave Need Wedding Dates	Kai – Hotel Manager	
2016	Ghostbusters	Bass Guitarist	
2017	Kong: Skull Island	Joe Reles	
2018	The Mule	Luis Rocha	
2020	The High Note	Seth	
2020	Golden Arm	Greg	
2022	Easter Sunday	Eugene	
2026	Influenced	Yuki	
2026	Avengers Endgame: Encore	Casey	Uncredited; extended version of Avengers: Endgame
2026	Avengers: Doomsday	Casey	Post-production

=== Television ===
Year	Title	Role	Notes
1998–1999	Upright Citizens Brigade	Various	3 episodes
2008	Human Giant	T-shirt Fan	Episode: "I'm Gonna Live Forever!"
2009	Late Night with Jimmy Fallon	Various	2 episodes
2010	The Office	Gas Station Attendant	Episode: "The Search"
2011	Curb Your Enthusiasm	Security Guard #1	Episode: "The Divorce"
2011	The Life & Times of Tim	Various voices	2 episodes
2012	Happy Endings	Co-Worker 2	Episode: "Cazsh Dummy Spillionaires"
2012	Up All Night	Scott Friend #1	Episode: "Thanksgiving"
2012–2014	Key & Peele	Various	3 episodes
2013	Newsreaders	TSA Agent #1	Episode: "Epic Fail"
2013	Arrested Development	Cab Driver	Episode: "Flight of the Phoenix"
2013–2015	Kroll Show	Various	5 episodes
2013–2015	Comedy Bang! Bang!	Various	3 episodes
2013–2018	Steven Universe	Jamie, Buddy Buddwick, additional voices	Voice, 6 episodes
2014	House of Lies	Everett	4 episodes
2014	Hawaii Five-0	George Moku	Episode: "Pale 'la"
2014	Silicon Valley	Jamie	Episode: "Articles of Incorporation"
2014	Playing House	D.J.	Episode: "Spaghetti and Meatballs"
2014	Drunk History	King Kalaniʻōpuʻu	Episode: "Hawaii"
2014	Garfunkel and Oates	Fred	Episode: "Hair Swap"
2015	Parks and Recreation	Minister Xorpaxx-7	Episode: "One Last Ride"
2015	Other Space	Michael Newman	8 episodes
2015	The Hotwives of Las Vegas	DJ	Episode: "Labor of Love"
2015–2017	Crazy Ex-Girlfriend	Alex	5 episodes
2016	The UCB Show	Performer	Episode: "Sissy Is My Mommy"
2016	Teachers	Marty Crumbs	2 episodes
2016	Son of Zorn	Ron Lee	Episode: "A Taste of Zephyria"
2016	The Earliest Show	Chef Tommy	2 episodes
2016–2020	The Good Place	Pillboi	6 episodes
2017	Making History	Lonnie Rialto	Episode: "Night Cream"
2017	Brooklyn Nine-Nine	Pandemic	Episode: "Crime and Punishment"
2017	Veep	Buzzy Kanahale	2 episodes
2017	Do You Want to See a Dead Body?	Gregory	Episode: "A Body and a High School Reunion (with Joe Lo Truglio)"
2017–2018	Grace and Frankie	Officer Torres	2 episodes
2017–2019	I'm Sorry	Brandon	3 episodes
2017–2019	Bajillion Dollar Propertie$	DJ Rosedragon	14 episodes
2018	Archer	Manu	Voice. episode: "Danger Island: Strange Pilot"
2018	Strange Angel	Pueblo Powder Company Employee	Episode: "Augurs of Spring"
2018	Wrecked	Errol	6 episodes
2018	Dream Corp LLC	Patient 37	Episode: "The Bullied"
2019	Black Monday	Ronnie	2 episodes
2019	Weird City	Pandrew	Episode: "A Family"
2019	Those Who Can't	Kenny	Episode: "Yes We Scan"
2019	Star vs. the Forces of Evil	Mr. Ordonia	Voice, episode: "Jannanigans"
2019	Helpsters	Librarian	Episode: "Rita Reader / Cody Gets a Cold"
2019	The Mandalorian	Stoke	Episode: "Chapter 4: Sanctuary"
2019–2020	Bob's Burgers	Brian / Sawyer D.	Voice, 2 episodes
2019–2021	Tacoma FD	Andy Myawani	36 episodes
2020	Carol's Second Act	Greg	Episode: "Carol's Crush"
2020	Loafy	Scrooge	Voice, 5 episodes
2020–2021	Close Enough	Dante / various	Voice, 4 episodes
2020–2021	Central Park	Brendan / Kite Boy	Voice, 10 episodes
2020–2024	Star Trek: Lower Decks	Sam Rutherford	Voice, main role
2021	No Activity	Jarrod	Voice, episode: "Exit Counselor"
2021	Ten Year Old Tom	Hector	Voice, episode: "Landscaper on the Couch/Nurse's Wedding"
2021	The Great North	Craig Ptarmigan	Voice, episode: "Beef's Craig Beef Adventure"
2021–2023	Loki	Casey / Hunter K-5E / Frank Morris	8 episodes
2022	Little Demon	Bennigan	Voice
2023	Star Trek: Strange New Worlds	Sam Rutherford	Voice, episode: "Those Old Scientists"
2023–2024	Kiff	Secretary Prince, Pone, additional voices	Voice, recurring role
2024	Rock Paper Scissors	Putty	Voice, episode: "Putty"
2024	Sesame Street	Bobby Manalo	Episode: "5428 Tamir Learns Tagalog"
2024	Jurassic World: Chaos Theory	Mateo	Voice, recurring role
2024–present	A Man on the Inside	Joel Piñero	10 episodes
2025–present	Haunted Hotel	Charlie	Voice
2026	Very Important People	Sudzo	Episode: "Sudzo"
2026	Sun Chaser	Archie	Voice
2026	Dang!	Nate Ohlendorf	Voice, episode: "The Hottest Old People on Earth"
2026	Golden Axe	Bruiser	Voice
