= Brother Rice High School (Michigan) =

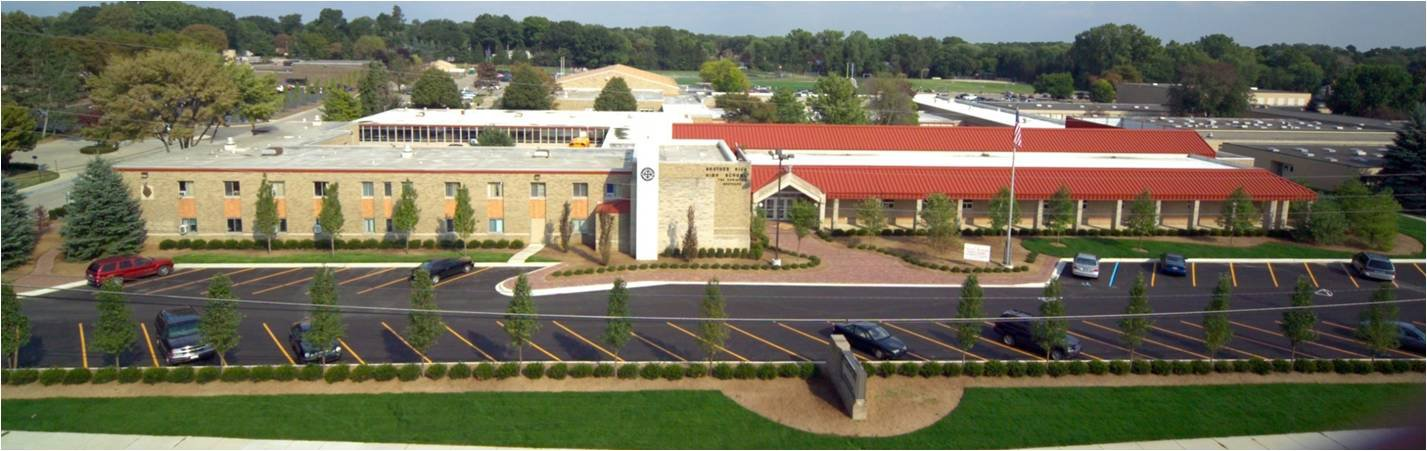

Location
- 7101 Lahser Road; Bloomfield Township, Michigan 48301; United States; 42°32′9″N 83°15′47″W

Information
- Type: Private, All-Boys
- Motto: Sanctitas per Scientam (Latin: Holiness through Knowledge)
- Religious affiliations: Roman Catholic, Christian Brothers
- Established: 1960
- President: Tom Reidy
- Principal: Edward Okuniewski
- Chaplain: Fr. John Dudek
- Grades: 9–12
- Enrollment: 550 (2023)
- Colors: Black and Orange
- Athletics conference: Catholic High School League
- Nickname: Warriors
- Accreditation: North Central Association of Colleges and Schools
- Newspaper: Chieftain
- Yearbook: Quest
- Website: www.brrice.edu

Brother Rice High School is a Catholic, all-boys, non-residential college prep school with approximately 600 students located in Bloomfield Township, Michigan, United States in Metro Detroit. The school shares a campus with the all-girls Marian High School, Saint Regis Parish and the K-8 Saint Regis School.

== History ==
Located in the Roman Catholic Archdiocese of Detroit, Brother Rice was founded by the Congregation of Christian Brothers in 1960 and named after their founder Edmund Ignatius Rice.

The school was the site of a labor battle in 2003 and 2004 when a group of teachers attempted to unionize. However, a state court ruled that state labor and union boards have no jurisdiction over private religious schools.

== Athletics ==
The Brother Rice Warriors are also known for their tradition of excellence in athletics having won 80 state championships since their first title, the 1974 basketball championship. The lacrosse team has won the state title 24 times and was the 2008 Inside Lacrosse National Champion.

The Warriors are members of the Michigan High School Athletic Association and compete in the Detroit Catholic League with Detroit Catholic Central High School as their respected arch rival.

== Activities ==
The debate team has won 14 state championships and placed first in the world in the 2007 United Nations Foundation and International Debate Education Association (IDEA) Global Debates.

== Notable alumni ==
- B. J. Armstrong '85 - retired pro basketball player, NBA champion
- Matt Baker '01 - retired NFL player
- John Blackwell '23 - college basketball player for the Duke Blue Devils
- Larry Borom '17 - Offensive lineman for the Detroit Lions
- Mike Bouchard '74 - Oakland County Sheriff
- Brian Brennan '80 - retired NFL player
- Jim Browne - former NFL player
- Greg Collins '71 - Actor; retired NFL player
- Eugene Cordero '96 - comedian and actor
- Mel Farr Jr. ‘84 - retired NFL player
- Mike Farr ‘85 - retired NFL player
- Brad Galli '07 - sports reporter
- DaRon Gilbert '19 - UFL player for the Rhode Island Breakers
- Paul Grant '92 - former NBA basketball player
- Brian Hainline '74 - chief medical officer of the NCAA and former chief medical officer of the USTA
- Chris Hansen '77 - TV journalist, NBC's To Catch a Predator
- John James '99 - U.S. Representative for Michigan's 10th congressional district
- Andy Juett - comedian
- Karl Kauffmann ‘16 - Major League Baseball player
- Klint Kesto '99 - former member of the Michigan House of Representatives
- Bob Kula '85 - retired professional football player
- T. J. Lang '05 - retired NFL player for Green Bay Packers, Detroit Lions
- David M. Lawson '69 - federal judge
- DJ LeMahieu '07 - Major League Baseball player, 2016 NL batting champion, 2020 AL batting champion
- Mike Lodish '85 - retired NFL player, 2-time Super Bowl champion
- Thomas Lynch - poet
- Mackenzie MacEachern '12 - NHL player for St. Louis Blues, Stanley Cup Champion
- Timothy M. Maganello '68 - former CEO of BorgWarner
- Gerald McGowan '64 - former US Ambassador to Portugal
- Matthew Milia '04 and David Jones '03 - folk musicians Frontier Ruckus
- Pete Mitchell '90 - retired NFL player
- Steve Morrison '90 - retired NFL player
- David Morrow '89 - founder of Warrior Sports
- Luke Newman '20 – NFL player for the Chicago Bears
- Udodi Onwuzurike '21 - Olympic sprinter for Nigeria
- Sergio Perkovic '13 - Premier Lacrosse League for Redwoods
- Nick Plummer '15 - Major League Baseball player
- Zip Rzeppa '70 - TV sportscaster, author, speaker
- John Shasky '82 - former NBA basketball player
- Thomas Sugrue '80 - scholar and historian
- Tim Washe '19 - NHL player
- Gemara Williams '01 - retired NFL player
