= High Plains Comedy Festival =

- Genre: Comedy festival
- Locations: Denver, Colorado
- Years active: 12
- Founded: 2013
- Next event: September 18-20, 2025
- Website: http://highplainscomedyfestival.com/

High Plains Comedy Festival is a comedy festival held each August in Denver, Colorado. It was founded in 2013 by Denver comedian/writer Adam Cayton-Holland and comedian/producer Andy Juett. The festival features a mix of local and national comics in venues throughout Denver's Baker neighborhood. Starting in 2016, Juett parted ways with the festival and Karen Wachtel became executive producer. As of 2019, the production team includes Cayton-Holland, Wachtel, Jessi Whitten, Ron Doyle, Carlos Madrid, and Will Hancock.

== 2013 ==
High Plains was established in 2013 as Denver's first all stand-up comedy festival and ran August 23-24, 2013. The festival was sponsored by Denver-based burrito restaurant Illegal Pete's. The lineup included Kyle Kinane, Sean Patton, Andrew Orvedahl, Adam Cayton-Holland, Ben Roy, Kurt Braunohler, Jake Weisman, Ian Douglas Terry, Andy Wood, Kate Berlant and Amber Tozer. Headliner Reggie Watts joined dozens of local Denver comedians, live podcast recordings, and open mic shows to round out the festival. Venues included South Broadway bars, restaurants and clubs including the Hi-Dive, the Hornet, 3 Kings Tavern, and Mutiny Information Cafe, along with the Gothic Theatre in neighboring Englewood, Colorado.

== 2014 ==
High Plains returned for its second year August 22-23, 2014. The headlining performances took place in the historic McNichols Building in Civic Center Park. The 2014 lineup included Pete Holmes, T.J. Miller, Jared Logan, Kate Berlant, Kumail Nanjiani, Ben Kronberg, Cameron Esposito, and Beth Stelling, along with more than 25 other comedians.
