= Andrew Orvedahl =

American comedian (born 1976)

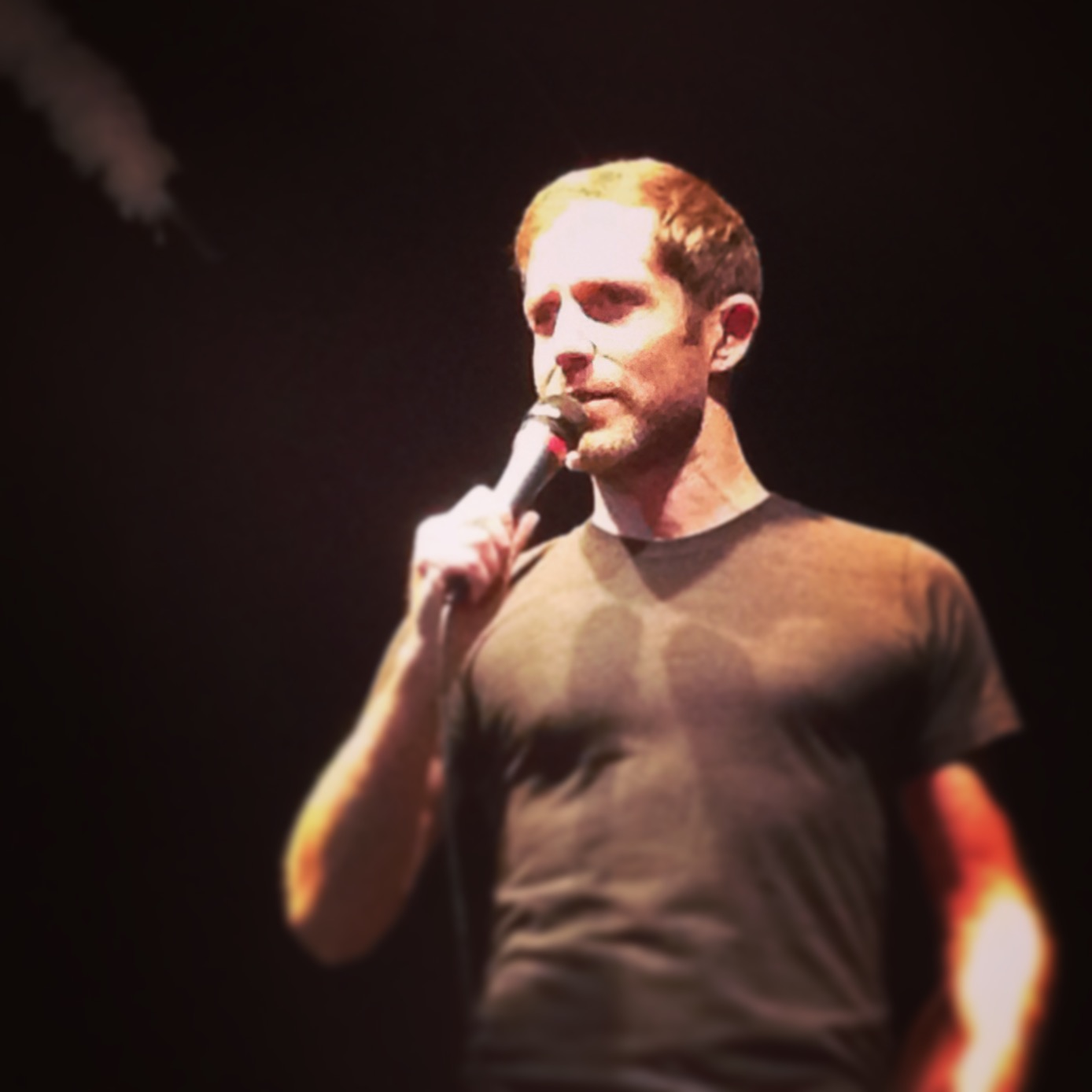
- Orvedahl performing at the September 2014 Grawlix show
- Born: December 21, 1976 (age 49)

Comedy career
- Genre: Observational comedy
- Website: fiveunicorns.com

Andrew Orvedahl (born December 21, 1976) is an American comedian best known for his work with The Grawlix, a comedy trio consisting of Orvedahl, Adam Cayton-Holland and Ben Roy, and the TruTV scripted comedy television show Those Who Can't. As a member of The Grawlix, Orvedahl has starred in a series of Funny or Die video releases written and directed by The Nix Bros and the Grawlix Saves The World, a podcast on the Starburns Audio Network.

== Career ==
=== Stand-up comedian ===
Orvedahl started stand-up in 2003. In addition to performing regularly at his home club, Comedy Works in Denver, Orvedahl has toured the US, and performed at the Aspen (2011), Las Vegas, Seattle (2010), Great American (2012), Bridgetown (2011, 2012, 2013), and High Plains (2013, 2014) Comedy Festivals, and was part of the "New Faces" Showcase at Montreal Just for Laughs in 2013.

In 2013, Orvedahl released his comedy album Hit The Dick Lights as a dual release with fellow Grawlix member Adam Cayton-Holland. Holland's album I Don't Know If I Happy shares similar album art, was recorded on the same date at the same theater (Denver's historic Bug Theatre) as Orvedahl's, and both were released on Illegal Pete's Greater Than Collective label.

In 2020, Orvedahl released his album "Alexa, Play Creed" on Helium Comedy Records.

Orvedahl has appeared on "NickMom Night Out" and "Last Comic Standing", and on October 13, 2014, made his debut performance on "The Tonight Show Starring Jimmy Fallon".

=== The Grawlix ===
In 2007, Orvedahl was a core member of "Los Comicos Super Hilariosos," a regular show that welcomed big-name comics like Arj Barker, Maria Bamford, Tig Notaro, and Moshe Kasher. The group eventually dissolved and reformed as The Grawlix in 2011.

The Grawlix consists of Orvedahl, Ben Roy and Adam Cayton-Holland. The trio performed a monthly show at The Bug Theatre in Denver, featuring standup sets from each of the principals, a variety of national guest comedians, and screenings of their web series videos, produced by The Nix brothers.

=== Those Who Can't ===
The Grawlix also teamed with The Nix Brothers to produce a pilot for Amazon in June 2012 called Those Who Can't, about three inept Denver high school teachers. While Amazon eventually passed on the pilot, TruTV paid the trio to rewrite and re-film it in December 2014. In February 2015, the network announced they were ordering 10 episodes of the series, which aired in 2015. It was renewed for a 10-episode second season, which aired in 2016.

=== The Narrators ===
In 2010, Orvedahl created the storytelling show The Narrators, a live performance of true stories based around a selected theme as told by musicians, comedians, actors, and writers. The Narrators podcast highlights select stories from the live shows. Orvedahl left the show in 2015 to film Those Who Can't in Los Angeles.

=== The Unicorn ===
In 2013, Orvedahl created The Unicorn podcast, with co-host Talitha and producer Ron Doyle. The show features a special guest comedian, and the group discusses sex and relationships. Past guests have included Kyle Kinane, Cameron Esposito, and Ben Kronberg.

=== Awards ===
In 2012, Orvedahl won a MasterMinds award from Westword—a grant program honoring artistic entrepreneurs who are changing the cultural landscape. In December 2013, Time Out New York voted Orvedahl's album Hit The Dick Lights as one of the top 10 comedy albums of 2013.

== Personal life ==
Orvedahl was born and raised in Denver, and attended Heritage High School. Though he has moved around the country, living in New York City, Cocoa Beach, Florida, and Los Angeles, he returned to Colorado and currently lives in Denver. Orvedahl has one child, Jupiter, who co-starred in their own online cooking show called The Barefoots—Orvedahl served as director, cinematographer and film editor.

== Albums ==
- Andy Makes 15 of His 22 Friends Laugh
- Hit The Dick Lights
- Alexa, Play Creed
