= Alison Nix =

American fashion model (born 1988)

- Born: June 19, 1988 (age 37); Denver, Colorado, USA
- Modeling information
- Height: 5 ft 10 in (1.78 m)
- Hair color: Brown
- Eye color: Blue
- Agency: New York Model Management (New York); Ford Models (Paris, Los Angeles); Monster Management (Milan); Storm Model Management (London); Traffic Models (Barcelona); Seeds Management (Berlin); 2pm Model Management (Copenhagen); Modelwerk (Hamburg); MP Stockholm (Stockholm)

Alison Nix (born June 19, 1988) is an American fashion model. She has modeled for Dior, Hugo Boss, Givenchy, Marc by Marc Jacobs, Vivienne Westwood, Diane von Fürstenberg, Dolce & Gabbana, Hussein Chalayan, Jean Paul Gaultier, John Galliano, Lanvin, Narciso Rodriguez, Yohji Yamamoto, Vogue Italia, Numero, and others.

Alison is the younger sister to filmmakers Evan and Adam Nix, who are known as The Nix Brothers and who front the band Total Ghost. Together they have produced several popular short films that can be seen on Funny Or Die.
