= The Nix brothers =

American film directors and musicians

Evan and Adam Nix
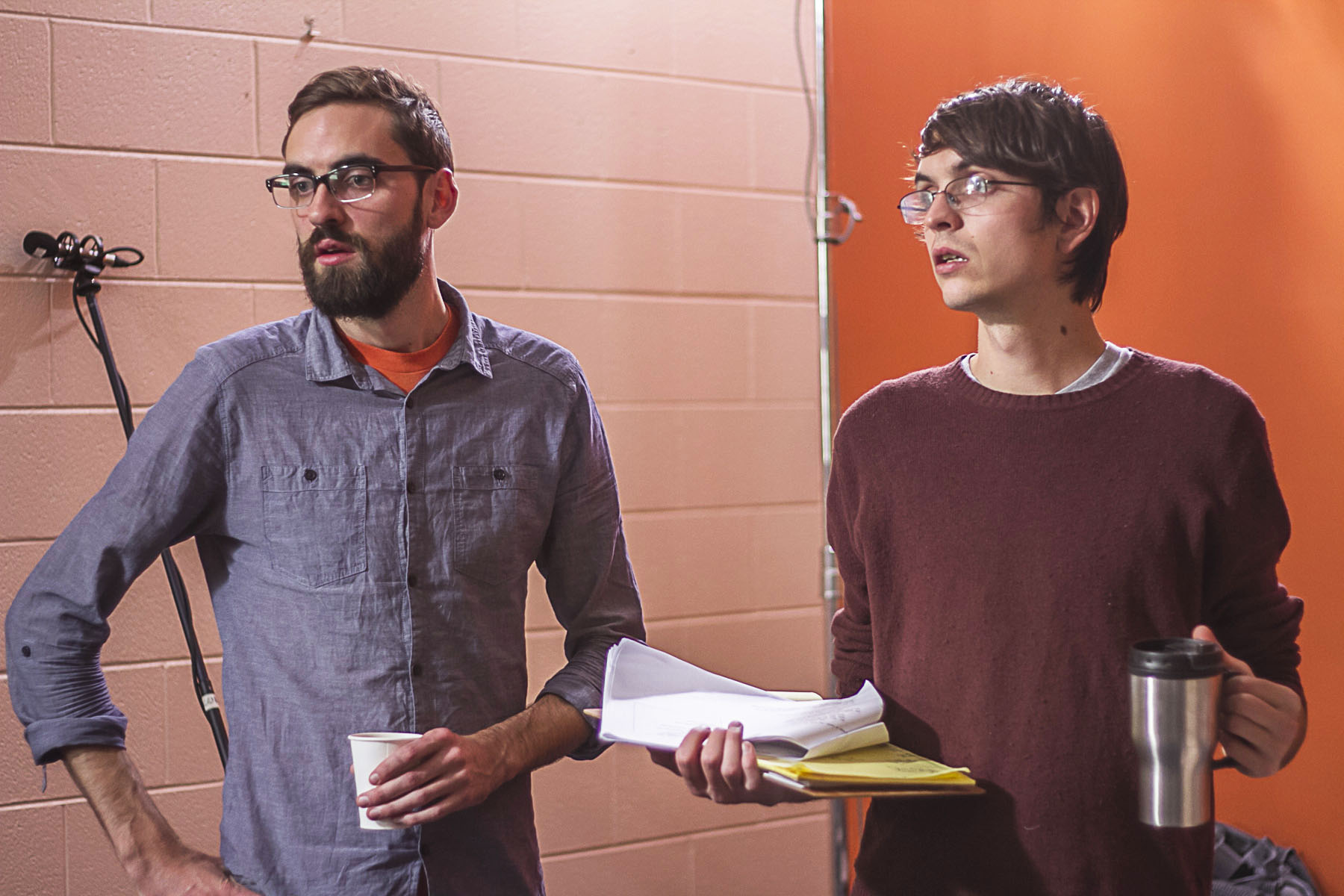
- Evan (left) and Adam (right) on the set of one of their productions
- Born: Evan Nix; December 10, 1983 (age 42); Denver, Colorado, U.S. Adam Nix; October 11, 1986 (age 39); Denver, Colorado, U.S.
- Occupations: Film directors, producers, screenwriters, film editors, cinematographers, musicians
- Years active: 2004–present
- Notable work: The Grawlix, Total Ghost
- Website: nixbros.com

Evan Nix (born December 10, 1983) and Adam Nix (born October 11, 1986), known together professionally as the Nix Bros., are American film directors, producers, and musicians. They are most well known for filming the series The Grawlix on Funny Or Die, a weekly comedy show featuring regular appearances by comedians Adam Cayton-Holland, Ben Roy, and Andrew Orvedahl, and for directing an episode of Paul Feig's 2015 comedy series Other Space. The two are also known as the founding members of the synthpop comedy band Total Ghost, a group for which they won best music video at the Festivus film festival in Denver, Colorado. The Nix Bros. later directed the Festivus spinoff Laugh Track Comedy Festival in 2011 and 2012.

== Early life ==
Evan and Adam Nix were born in Denver, though spent most of their life growing up in Boulder City, Nevada, a town 20 miles outside of Las Vegas. The two were self-described hoodlums growing up, who were once caught breaking into a housing development that was under construction, causing thousands of dollars' worth of damage by gluing windows shut, and "throwing things down the stairs and just beating it up."

Their father was a city council member in Boulder City and they lived on a golf course, where the Nix brothers honed their skills as filmmakers by blowing things up and filming the explosions in slow motion. They studied filmmaking at the College of Southern Nevada and made short films before transferring to the Colorado Film School in 2006. Their sister is fashion model Alison Nix.

== Career ==
The duo's first film, Fortune Cookie, was recorded and edited in-camera on a VHS camcorder that Evan received as a gift when he was 14. The project won the Audience Award at the Boulder City, Nevada Dam Short Film Festival in 2004, though the duo hated the film and would later destroy all evidence of its existence. The Nix Bros. continued experimenting with the camcorder, making short films such as Lowell Gleason Wears Glasses, before eventually moving to Denver in 2006 to attend The Colorado Film School.

While in Denver, the Nix Bros. continued making films and submitting to film festivals. Working with friend Nathan Lund from Las Vegas, the duo filmed the documentary-style video Rainbow Chasers, a comedy that spoofs storm-chasing meteorologists.

The duo have been accused of communicating on set telepathically due to their deep voices and their quiet demeanor according to Evan who said in an interview, "We both have deep voices and talk at a level that is hard for most people to hear...so they think we're communicating without words, but really we're carrying on full conversations. You just can't hear them."

In 2012, Adam and Evan collaborated with comedian T. J. Miller on his music video for the song Denver that appears on Miller's 2012 album The Extended Play E.P.. The video premiered at the Film on the Rocks event held in Denver's Red Rocks during the premiere of Bridesmaids.

In April 2013, The Nix Bros. teamed up with The Grawlix crew to film Those Who Can't, a pilot for Amazon Studios. Amazon plans to let viewers vote on 14 new pilots with the winner(s) eventually becoming full-time shows on the Amazon web based network. Those Who Can't features Cayton-Holland, Roy, and Orvedahl of The Grawlix and centers on 3 immature high school teachers.

In April 2014, The Nix brothers released Mile High, a video short on Funny Or Die that depicts the effects of the recent legalization of cannabis in their home town of Denver, Colorado. The video borrows its name from the nickname Mile High-City given to Denver for its "mile high" level above the sea (5,280 feet), and is a double entendre on the lengthy, "mile long" trip the main character takes through a very "high" Denver.
