= Adam Cayton-Holland =

American comedian (born 1980)

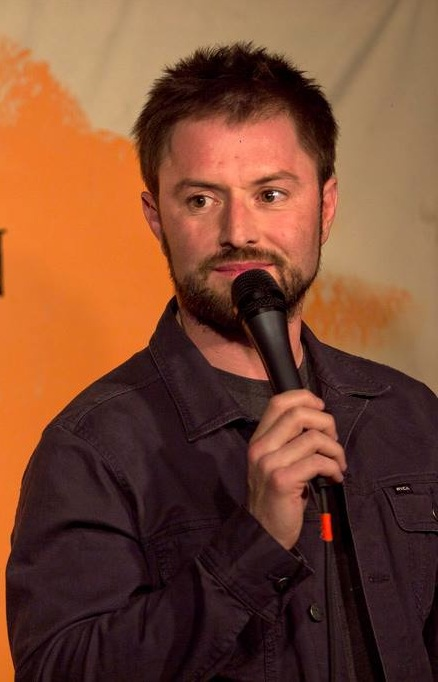
- Adam Cayton-Holland performing live
- Born: Adam Lauren Cayton-Holland; June 2, 1980 (age 46)
- Other name: ACH
- Spouse: Katie Cayton-Holland
- Children: 2

Comedy career
- Years active: 2007–present
- Genre: Alternative comedy
- Website: adamcaytonholland.com

Adam Cayton-Holland (born June 2, 1980) is an American stand-up comedian from Denver, Colorado best known for his work with the comedy trio The Grawlix and their sitcom television series Those Who Can't. Cayton-Holland is also a writer who has been published in numerous regional and national publications; his first book, Tragedy Plus Time: A Tragi-Comic Memoir, received the 2019 Colorado Book Award for Creative Non-Fiction. He is the founder and executive director of High Plains Comedy Festival. As a comic, he is a regular headliner at clubs and colleges throughout the United States and abroad.

== Career ==
=== Stand-up comedy ===
Adam Cayton-Holland started in stand-up comedy by attending open mics at Denver dive bars in 2003. In 2006, Cayton-Holland competed against nearly 200 other aspiring comedians for Comedy Works' New Talent showcase, and won.

Cayton-Holland was included in Esquires 25 Best New Stand-Up Comedians in 2012. That same year he was invited to the prestigious New Faces competition at Montreal's Just for Laughs Comedy Festival, appeared on the Nerdist podcast, and had a cameo on the ABC show Happy Endings (TV series). Along with his co-horts in The Grawlix, Cayton-Holland was named one of “10 Comics to Watch” by Variety magazine in 2015.

After making his national television stand-up debut on Conan in 2013, he appeared on The Pete Holmes Show in February 2014. He quickly followed that appearance with a repeat trip to South by Southwest where he was featured on the Comedy Bang! Bang! podcast and competed on @midnight against Baron Vaughn and Rove McManus. Cayton-Holland was invited back on @midnight for the September 17, 2014 episode when he competed against Beth Stelling and Nate Bargatze, winning the competition; and returned to the show again for the April 14, 2015 episode, facing Megan Neuringer and Kurt Braunohler.

=== The Grawlix ===
The Grawlix is a comedy trio from Denver, Colorado that includes Cayton-Holland, Ben Roy, and Andrew Orvedahl. The trio produces a monthly show at The Bug Theater in Denver, featuring standup sets from each of the principals and a variety of national guest comedians. Past shows also included regular screenings of their self-entitled web series, which was produced and directed by The Nix brothers.

The trio emerged from "Los Comicos Super Hilariosos," a comedy show created by Cayton-Holland with fellow comedians Greg Baumhauer, Ben Roy, Jim Hickox, and Andrew Orvedahl. During its run, "Los Comicos" welcomed big-name comics like Arj Barker, Maria Bamford, Tig Notaro, and Moshe Kasher. That group eventually dissolved and reformed as The Grawlix in 2011.

==== Those Who Can't ====
In June 2012, The Grawlix teamed with The Nix Brothers to produce a television pilot called Those Who Can't, a sitcom about three inept Denver high school teachers, for Amazon Studios. Amazon initially ordered six additional scripts, but eventually passed on the series. In December 2015, TruTV hired the trio to rewrite and re-film the pilot in December 2014. In February 2015, the network announced and order for 10 episodes of the series. The show ultimately aired on TruTV for three seasons.

==== The Grawlix Saves the World & Advice Fight ====
In January 2020, The Grawlix started a podcast, The Grawlix Saves the World. In the podcast, the trio presents a series of challenges to one another, hoping to better the world around them by bettering themselves. The podcast is produced by Ron S. Doyle and was originally part of the Sklarbro Country imprint on the Starburns Audio Network. In February 2025, the Grawlix Saves The World concluded after five seasons and 150 episodes. In March 2025, The Grawlix relaunched their podcast as Advice Fight, a satirical podcast where the three comedians compete to offer winning advice to their listeners’ problems.

=== Writer ===
Before becoming a comedian, Cayton-Holland was a journalist, working at Denver's alt-weekly Westword from 2003 through 2008. During his time with the alt-weekly, Cayton-Holland was best known for his column "What's So Funny?" and his long-form feature writing.

His writing has appeared in Spin, The Onion's A.V. Club. In late 2013, Cayton-Holland had a piece called "Ghosts I've Known" published in The Atlantic. The essay addressed the painful topic of his younger sister's suicide. Reviewer Michael Wear called it a "haunting," "beautiful," and "heartfelt" "love letter."

==== Tragedy Plus Time: A Tragi-Comic Memoir ====
Cayton-Holland's first book, Tragedy Plus Time: A Tragi-Comic Memoir, was published in August 2018 by Simon & Schuster. The book was a critical success and later was received the 2019 Colorado Book Award for Best Creative Non-Fiction. Asked to describe the book in 50 words or less, Cayton-Holland said, "If you're expecting a guide to navigating life after grief, this isn't it. It's an honest look at mental illness, depression, death and the beautiful relationships between families and siblings — one that lets you know that there is no guide to grief, and that it's still O.K. to laugh."

=== Other projects ===
==== High Plains Comedy Festival ====
In 2013, Cayton-Holland partnered with Denver producer Andy Juett to launch the High Plains Comedy Festival. In its inaugural year, the Festival ran three days in venues throughout Denver, and featured both local and national talent—including headliner Reggie Watts, Matt Braunger, and Kyle Kinane. High Plains returned to Denver in 2014 with T.J. Miller, Kumail Nanjiani, and Pete Holmes headlining.

==== Happy Place ====
In 2019, Cayton-Holland adapted his book Tragedy Plus Time into a one-man play called Happy Place. He workshopped Happy Place at Buntport Theater in Denver, the Dairy Arts Center in Boulder, and the Moxi Theater in Greeley, in preparation for its official debut at the Montreal Just For Laughs Festival in July 2019. In recognition of his work on the play, Cayton-Holland received the 2019 True West Award from the Denver Center for the Performing Arts.

==== My Dining Room Table ====
From 2013 to 2015, Cayton-Holland produced a biweekly podcast called My Dining Room Table. The central concept of the podcast was Cayton-Holland's loyalty to and love of Denver and his home (hence, the majority of the recordings took place at his actual dining room table), and his subsequent decision to stay in the city rather than move to LA or New York. He interviewed local and national comics and musicians about a variety of topics, but often returned to the core ideas of "home" and "success" while promoting the burgeoning Denver cultural scene.

== Personal life ==
Cayton-Holland grew up in the neighborhood of Park Hill, Denver. He attended East High School in Denver and Wesleyan University where he majored in film. Cayton-Holland lives with his wife and two sons in Denver, Colorado.

His "twin obsessions" are birdwatching and the Colorado Rockies baseball team. His father has held Rockies season tickets since the team was formed. Before the start of the 2014 season, Cayton-Holland campaigned to throw out the ceremonial first pitch at a Rockies' game. He created buzz on Twitter with the hashtag #ACHFirstPitch, and took the plea national when he talked about it on The Pete Holmes Show. On April 7, 2014, Cayton-Holland got his wish when he threw out the first pitch at a Rockies vs. White Sox game at Coors Field.

== Discography ==
Comedy specials

- Dick Jokes for Artists (2008)
- I Don't Know If I Happy (2013)
- Backyards (2015)
- Performs His Signature Bits (2018)
- Semblance of Normalcy (2020)

== Filmography ==
=== Scripted ===
Year	Title	Role	Network	Notes
2011	Happy Endings	Customer	ABC	Episode: "Baby Steps"
2013	Those Who Can't	Loren Payton	Amazon Studios	Also writer; short film
2013	Five Steps	Officer Collins	N/A	Short film
2016	Deadbeat	Gary	Hulu	Episode: "Bong Pong"
2016	Hidden America with Jonah Ray	Eunick	Seeso	Episode: "Austin: End of the Road"
2016–19	Those Who Can't	Loren Payton	TruTV	Main role; also creator, executive producer, writer

=== Stand up ===
Year	Title	Network	Notes
2008	Dick Jokes for Artists	N/A	Self-produced comedy special
2013	Conan	TBS	Episode: "The Day the Mime Stood Still "
2014	The Pete Holmes Show	TBS	Episode: "Paul Scheer: Interview #1 "
2014	Just for Laughs: All-Access	CTV	Episode: "Bobby Moynihan & Taran Killam"
2014	The Meltdown with Jonah and Kumail	Comedy Central	2 episodes
2016	Conan	TBS	Episode: "Bob Costas/Teresa Palmer/Adam Cayton-Holland"
2017	The Guest List	Seeso	Episode 2.1
2017	Comedy Central Stand-Up Presents	Comedy Central	Episode: "Solomon Georgio "
2018	The Late Late Show with James Corden	CBS	Episode 4.87
2020	The Standup Show with Jon Dore	CTV	Episode 1.4

=== Other credits ===
- @midnight (Comedy Central, 2014–2016); contestant, 5 episodes
- Welcome to Bridgetown (2015); documentary
- The Playboy Morning Show (2016); with The Grawlix
- Flophouse (Viceland, 2016); documentary with The Grawlix
- Talk Show the Game Show (Hulu, 2017); contestant
- Planet Scum Live (2020); with The Grawlix

== Bibliography ==
- Tragedy Plus Time: A Tragi-Comic Memoir, New York: Gallery Books/Simon & Schuster, 2009. ISBN 978150117016-4
