= Brad Galli =

American sports reporter (born 1989)

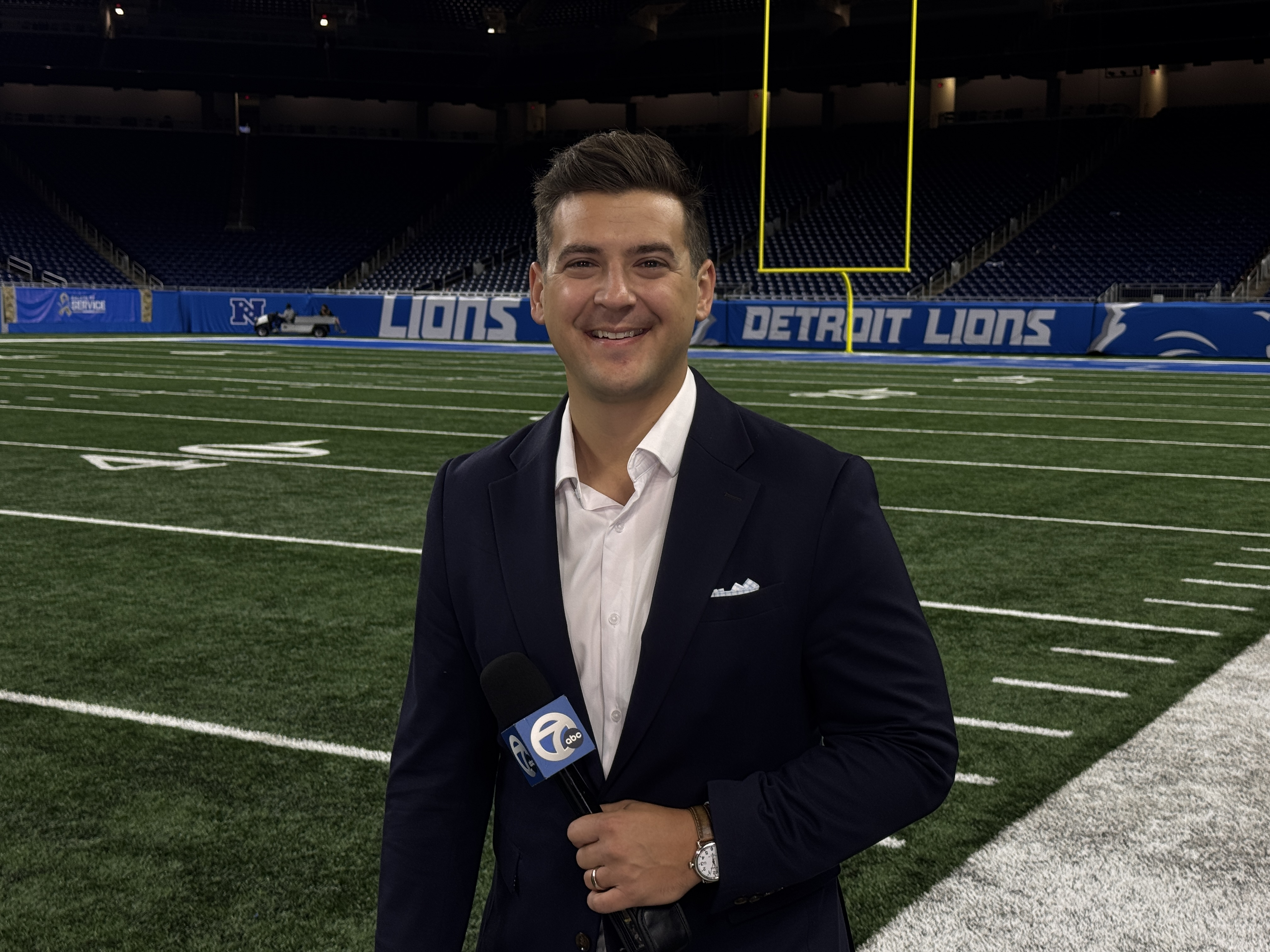
- Born: 1989 (age 36–37); Detroit, Michigan, U.S.
- Education: Marquette University, Communications
- Occupation: Television sports anchor
- Spouse: Claire Galli

Brad Galli (born 1989) is an American sports anchor and reporter for The Brad Galli Show, who previously worked at WXYZ-TV in Detroit.

== Education ==
Galli graduated in 2007 from Brother Rice High School (Michigan), where he played football and was a part of the 2005 MHSAA State Championship team.

Galli graduated from Marquette University with a degree in communications and a minor in theology. He worked as the sports director at MUTV (Marquette University Television) for two years, before graduating from the Milwaukee school in 2011. He covered the Marquette basketball team and created the show Marquette Basketball Weekly, which drew more than 30,000 views in two seasons. It is the most watched show in Marquette University Television history. Galli introduced ESPN basketball analyst Chris Broussard at a College of Communication Axthelm lecture in April 2011, and led a panel of discussion after the lecture.

In 2012, he returned to Marquette to serve as the emcee of the men's basketball banquet.

== Career ==
Galli joined WXYZ in 2011, working with sports anchors Don Shane and Tom Leyden.

Galli anchored WXYZ's 4pm news program, called The Now Detroit, from 2014 to 2015, before returning to the sports team to anchor and work as the sports director.

Galli was named Sportscaster of the Year in Michigan by the National Sports Media Association for 2018, 2021, and 2025. He earned an Emmy Award in 2016 for Excellence in Sports Anchoring in Michigan by the National Academy of Television Arts and Sciences. He won his first Emmy in 2014 for Excellence in Sports Reporting, and won again in 2016 for Excellence in Sports Anchoring.

Galli conducted weekly interviews with Jim Harbaugh for all nine seasons of the head coach's time at Michigan. His coverage of Michigan's 2023 national championship warranted millions of views on social media, notably including an interview with Jack and Jackie Harbaugh, Jim's parents, at the Rose Bowl. During the 2017 and 2018 football seasons, he hosted Inside Michigan Football with Jim Harbaugh on IMG Radio, the school's official, weekly radio show.

In 2026, Galli became the founder and host of The Brad Galli Show, his own media venture through social media platforms.

== Personal life ==
Galli resides in Birmingham, Michigan, with his wife and children.
