= Larry Borom =

American football player (born 1999)

No. 79 – Detroit Lions
- Position: Offensive tackle
- Roster status: Active

Personal information
- Born: March 30, 1999 (age 27); Detroit, Michigan, U.S.
- Listed height: 6 ft 5 in (1.96 m)
- Listed weight: 325 lb (147 kg)

Career information
- High school: Brother Rice (Bloomfield Township, Michigan)
- College: Missouri (2017–2020)
- NFL draft: 2021: 5th round, 151st overall pick

Career history
- Chicago Bears (2021–2024); Miami Dolphins (2025); Detroit Lions (2026–present)

Career NFL statistics as of 2025
- Games played: 63
- Games started: 38
- Fumble recoveries: 1
- Stats at Pro Football Reference

Larry Borom (born March 30, 1999) is an American professional football offensive tackle for the Detroit Lions of the National Football League (NFL). He played college football for the Missouri Tigers and was selected by the Chicago Bears in the fifth round of the 2021 NFL draft.

== Early life ==
Borom played at Birmingham Brother Rice where he was nominated first-team All-Detroit North in 2016.

== College career ==
Borom was ranked as a three–star recruit by 247Sports.com coming out of high school. He committed to Missouri on August 23, 2016. Borom red-shirted his freshman season in 2017. His presence was noticed early as offensive line coach Glen Elarbee called Borom a "Coke machine with a helmet on." As a redshirt freshman, Borom played in all 13 games for the 2018 season seeing time on special teams and as a backup right tackle. In 2019, Borom started 11 games beginning the season as the starting right guard before settling into the right tackle position for the latter half. For the 2020 campaign, Borom started all games as a right tackle. He was named 2nd team All-Southeastern (SEC) by Pro Football Focus and 3rd team All-SEC by Phil Steele. Shortly after the season, Borom announced his intention to forgo his senior season and declare for the NFL Draft.

== Professional career ==
Pre-draft measurables
Height	Weight	Arm length	Hand span	Wingspan	40-yard dash	10-yard split	20-yard split	Three-cone drill	Vertical jump	Broad jump	Bench press
6 ft 4 7/8 in (1.95 m)	322 lb (146 kg)	33 1/8 in (0.84 m)	10 3/8 in (0.26 m)	6 ft 8 in (2.03 m)	5.12 s	1.81 s	2.90 s	8.04 s	31.0 in (0.79 m)	8 ft 7 in (2.62 m)	21 reps
All values from Pro Day

=== Chicago Bears ===
Borom was selected by the Chicago Bears with the 151st pick of the 2021 NFL draft on May 1, 2021. On June 2, Borom signed his four-year rookie contract with Chicago. He was placed on injured reserve on September 18, 2021, after suffering an ankle injury in Week 1. He was activated on October 30, 2021.

On August 27, 2024, Borom was placed on injured reserve. He was activated on November 2.

=== Miami Dolphins ===
On March 13, 2025, Borom signed with the Miami Dolphins on a one-year, $2.5 million contract.

=== Detroit Lions ===
On March 12, 2026, Borom signed a one-year, $2.5 million contract with the Detroit Lions.
