= Timothy M. Manganello =

American automotive businessman (born 1950)

Timothy M. Manganello (born 1950) is an American automotive businessman. He was the chief executive officer and chairman of BorgWarner until 2013.

== Biography ==
=== Education ===
Manganello graduated from the University of Michigan in 1972, with a degree in mechanical engineering. He received a master's degree in mechanical engineering from the university in 1975. He attended Harvard Business School's six-week Advanced Management Program.

=== Career ===
Manganello began his automotive career at Chrysler Corporation in engineering management areas. He also worked in sales for PT Components-LinkBelt. Manganello became chief executive officer of BorgWarner in 2003; he had held senior positions within the company since 1989.
