= Those Who Can't =

American TV series

- Genre: Sitcom
- Created by: Adam Cayton-Holland; Andrew Orvedahl; Ben Roy
- Theme music composer: Charlie Continental
- Opening theme: "Quit Wastin' My Time" performed by Charlie Continental
- Composer: Eban Schletter
- Country of origin: United States
- Original language: English
- No. of seasons: 3
- No. of episodes: 35

Production
- Executive producers: Dean Lorey; Tracey Baird; Krysia Plonka; Michael Rotenberg; Josh Lieberman; Richard Korson
- Production location: Denver, Colorado Los Angeles, California Van Nuys High School
- Running time: 30 minutes (including commercials)
- Production companies: Thank You, Brain! Productions; 3 Arts Entertainment

Original release
- Network: truTV
- Release: February 11, 2016 – April 8, 2019

Those Who Can't is an American sitcom that aired on truTV. The series revolves around a group of teachers at a fictional high school in Denver, Colorado. It premiered February 11, 2016, and ran for three seasons before being canceled on April 24, 2019.

== Premise ==
Those Who Can't is a half-hour sitcom set in Denver, Colorado. The show follows three dysfunctional teachers, played by show creators Adam Cayton-Holland, Andrew Orvedahl and Ben Roy of the Denver-based comedy trio The Grawlix. More inept than the kids they teach, they are out to beat the system as they struggle to survive each day on their own terms. Maria Thayer stars as the school librarian with a bubbling passion for life. The show is set in the fictional Smoot High School, named after the Smoot-Hawley Tariff Act.

The show was originally set up for Amazon Studios who paid $50,000 to shoot the pilot. Amazon gave it a script order for 6 more episodes but ultimately did not order it to series. The show was acquired by truTV as their first-ever full-length scripted comedy and was ordered with 10 episodes. The acquisition was part of truTV's comedy-driven “Way More Fun” programming initiative. When the show was first created, Cayton-Holland stated they wrote the character of Abbey Logan (originally played by comedian Nikki Glaser), the high-school librarian, as the love interest. Orvedahl stated that in the pilot, Abbey "just sort of lived in the library and served only to flirt with Adam’s character.” The character and role was revised for the shows run at truTV and Abbey is stated to have become "one of the gang" with all the characters now on equal footing.

The show holds a TV-MA rating due to language and sexually suggestive humor. Its title is a reference to the George Bernard Shaw proverb "those who can, do; those who can't, teach."

== Cast ==
=== Main ===
- Adam Cayton-Holland as Loren Payton. A Spanish teacher who dwells on the fact that he once spent a semester in Spain, Loren is a major hipster who would rather spend his time at brewery openings than in the classroom. Loren is a spoiled and self-absorbed narcissist who grew up with wealthy parents.
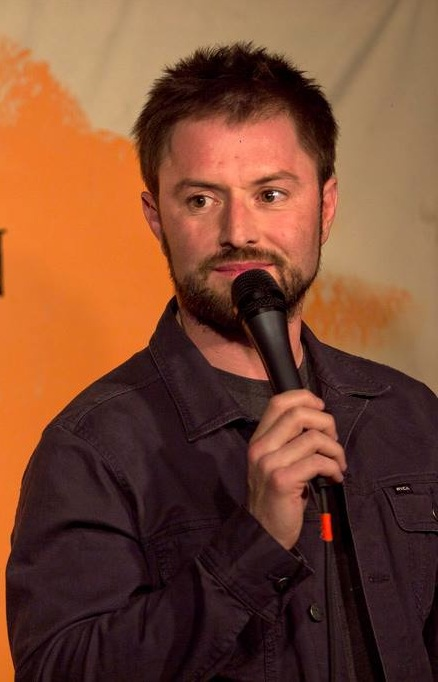
  Adam Cayton-Holland
- Andrew Orvedahl as Andy Fairbell. A gym teacher/JV volleyball coach/health teacher, Fairbell has a good heart but his naïveté and lack of social skills often leaves him on the receiving end of abuse from others as a result. He has been described as a "human golden retriever."
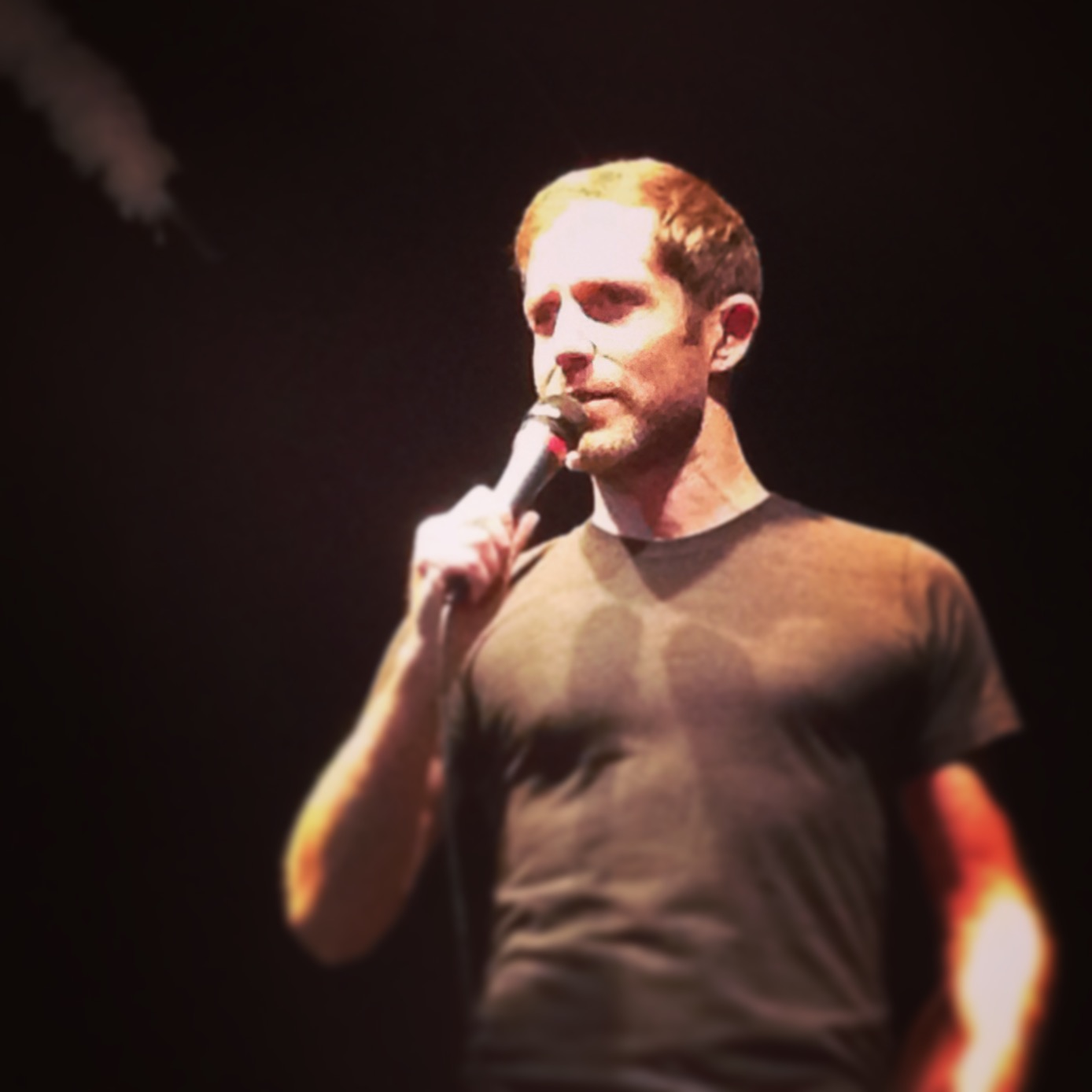
  Andrew Orvedahl
- Ben Roy as Billy Shoemaker. Shoemaker is a former high school punk rocker with tattooed arms and massive anger management issues. Separated from his wife, with whom he shares a son, he struggles to reconcile his past as an anti-establishment troublemaker who spent several years touring with his punk band, "Capitalist Emulsification," with his adult life as a history teacher and responsible family man.
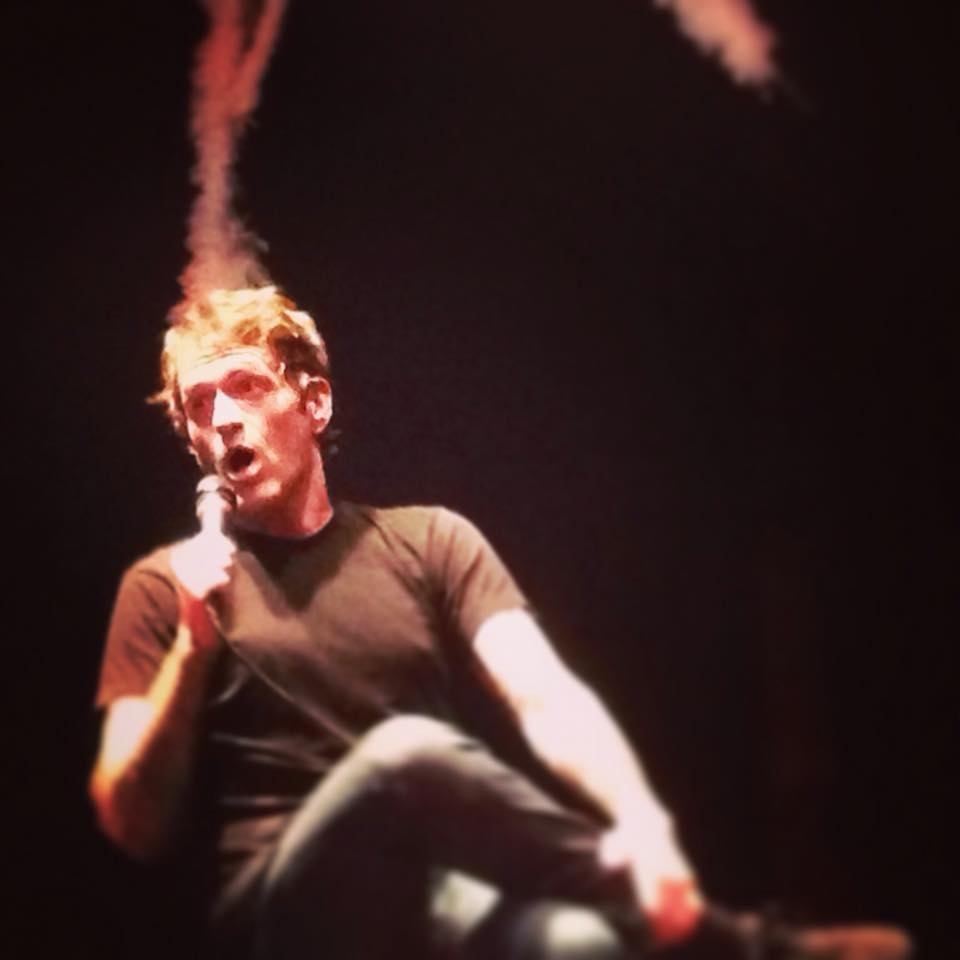
  Ben Roy
- Maria Thayer as Abbey Logan. The school librarian, who serves as the voice of reason against the other main cast and their schemes but is shown to be just as depraved as the others when pushed.
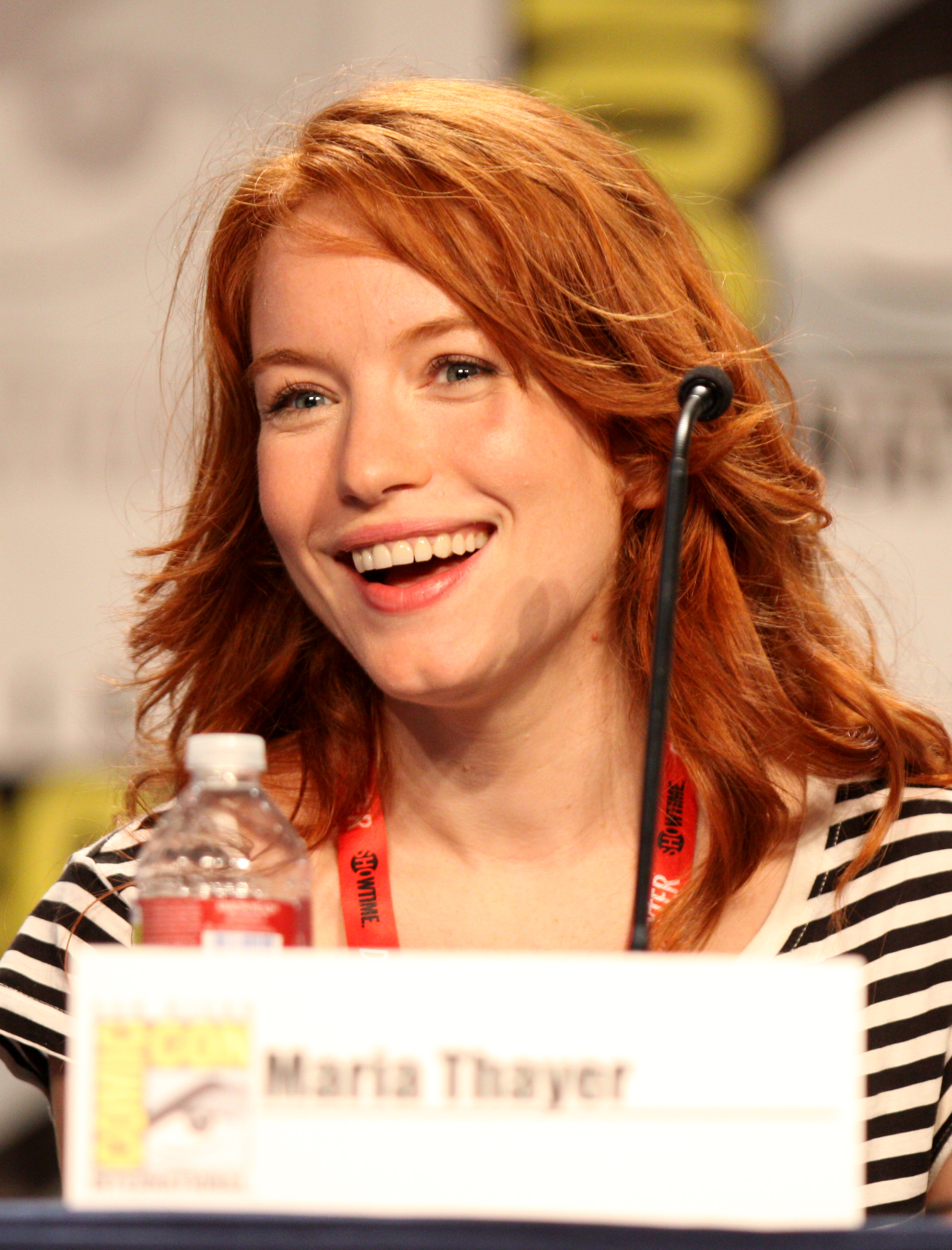
  Maria Thayer
- Rory Scovel as Principal Geoffrey Quinn. The naive school principal, who is just as incompetent as the teaching staff. Quinn considers "cool guy" Loren Payton to be his best friend, but it is mostly a one-sided friendship.

=== Recurring ===
- Sonya Eddy as Tammy, the secretary to Principal Quinn. She is often the only sensible person in the school, but is largely ignored and ridiculed. Tammy and Loren Payton have a strong mutual dislike.
- Kyle Kinane as Rod Knorr, an alcoholic teacher at Smoot. He is rarely sober at school, other than a few short stints of abstinence, and often gets caught up in the schemes of the other teachers. Billy Shoemaker dated his mother, Doris, until her death, which really bothered him. Often distills crème de menthe and is a big fan of Señor Frog's margaritas.
- The Sklar Brothers as Drs. Rick and Astor Green, a pair of twins who often take turns pretending to be the same school physician.
- Susie Essman as Leslie Bronn, the school's home ec teacher. She is sarcastic and abrasive and seems to have side hustles, such as making rock candy with Loren to sell when the school's vending machines were removed.
- Mary Lynn Rajskub as Summer, the drama teacher who is slightly unhinged.
- Peter Stormare as Superintendent Carson, the district superintendent who unsuccessfully attempts to run for mayor of Denver.
- Cheri Oteri as Cattie Goodman, a "fixer" for the school district who is assigned to replace Quinn as principal after his arrest. She is a devout Christian and is constantly horrified at the gang's antics, which eventually drive her insane.
- Patton Oswalt as Gil Nash, a real estate developer who is elected mayor and is revealed to be sabotaging the school so he can tear it down and build condos on the land.
- Jerry Minor as Steven Sweeney, Smoot's new guidance counselor whom the gang sees as a threat to their slacker lifestyle and whom Quinn uses as a personal therapist.

=== Guests ===
- Sarah Michelle Gellar as Gwen Stephanie, the president of the PTA.
- T.J. Miller as Uncle Jake, owner of a local pizzeria and Loren's cousin.
- Mark Hoppus as Measles, one of Shoemaker's former bandmates.
- Michael Madsen as Officer Callahan, the new school police officer, who is revealed to be blind and riding out his service until retirement.
- Will Sasso as Coach Irontoe, a former Denver Bronco whom Cattie appoints as new football coach, but is secretly stealing from the school.
- Kurt Angle as Coach Joe Donnelly, wrestling coach for a rival school whom Abbey has a crush on.

== Locations ==
Van Nuys High School is used as a stand-in for exterior shots of Smoot High.

== Episodes ==
=== Series overview ===
Season	Episodes	Originally released	
Season	Episodes	First released	Last released
1	10	February 11, 2016	April 14, 2016
2	12	October 6, 2016	December 8, 2016
3	13	January 14, 2019	April 8, 2019

=== Season 1 (2016) ===
No. overall	No. in season	Title	Directed by	Written by	Original release date	US viewers (millions)
1	1	"The Boys Are Coming Together"	Evan Nix & Adam Nix	Adam Cayton-Holland & Andrew Orvedahl & Ben Roy	February 11, 2016	0.444
High school teachers Loren Payton, Andy Fairbell, and Billy Shoemaker are being tormented by one of the school's football players, Bryce, who takes sadistic glee in terrorizing his teachers. To get back at him, they conspire to plant drugs in his locker. After a madcap quest to obtain them, they find their scheme failed because Bryce's dad bribed the school's principal into allowing his son to go unpunished. Upset that her friends' plan failed, librarian Abbey Logan vandalizes Bryce's new car with drawings of male genitals.
2	2	"Oof, Nut City"	Fred Goss	Andrew Orvedahl	February 11, 2016	0.317
Loren, Shoemaker and Fairbell try to help get a shy student, Richard Cooper, elected student body president after the former president is impeached by his classmates after it is revealed that he was born in Canada. However, the plan backfires as Richard becomes drunk with the power that comes with being popular and Loren begins a smear campaign against his opposition, popular girl Becky Cosgrove. Meanwhile, Quinn and Abbey clash over how to run the debate, as Quinn wants a fun and light-hearted debate and Abbey wants the kids to experience the real political process.
3	3	"Lady and the Skamp"	Peter Lauer	Ben Roy	February 18, 2016	0.351
When faulty gym equipment puts Andy into the hospital and he is ordered to continue teaching in spite of his injuries, the teachers goes on strike to protest. While Abbey and Shoemaker feud over who will be the spokesman of the group, Loren uses the break from teaching to get drunk and celebrate not working. However, Tammy reveals that the teachers failed to notify the union that they were going to strike and could be fired if the strike is discovered. When the union rep arrives, he informs the teachers that he doesn't mind but he has to punish someone for appearances. He decides to suspend Fairbell for two weeks with pay, much to Fairbeel's dismay and everyone else's annoyance. Special Guest: Susie Essman
4	4	"The Fairbell Tape"	Roger Kumble	Dean Lorey	February 25, 2016	0.293
The PTA, led by Gwen Stephanie (Sarah Michelle Gellar), get vending machines banned from the school and the teacher's lounge. While Shoemaker sneds Abbey undercover to get dirt on Gwen to blackmail her into restoring the vending machines to the school, Loren is recruited by his former home economics teacher into making rock candy for her black market candy ring. Meanwhile, Andy comes out as sexually inexperienced/confused to Billy when he is forced to teach sex ed to the students, and reveals his "wank tape" to Billy: a surrealistic compilation of random images which he uses to masturbate to. The tape produces a hypnotic euphoric sexual effect upon those who watch it. When Gwen discovers Abbey and Shoemaker's plans, Abbey trades the Fairbell Tape in exchange for the vending machines. The tape, which has been watched by everyone in school, breaks as the PTA watches it, prompting the women to attack Fairbell, who proclaims he does not like "lady sex".
5	5	"Of Lice and Men"	Fred Goss	Adam Cayton-Holland	March 3, 2016	0.384
Loren brings a used couch to the teacher's lounge, inadvertently triggering a lice infestation. Because of his own experiences having lice as a kid, Loren is put in charge of cleansing the school of lice and promptly goes drunk with power, declaring a lock-down. Abbey uses the lockdown to terrorize the popular kids to hang out with her as friends while Fairbell gets trapped in the air vents, when he has a panic attack over the prospect of being infected with lice. Meanwhile, Shoemaker and Tammy turn checking the kids' hair for lice into a hairstyling competition. Special Guest: Susie Essman
6	6	"What's Eating Uncle Jake?"	Evan Nix & Adam Nix	Kate Heckman & Ian McLees	March 10, 2016	0.203
The school's volleyball team reaches the state finals, which leads to the school's PTA suspending Andy as coach so they replace him with a more famous coach that they think will have a better chance at winning the big game. In response, the team's star player, Little Debbie, quits the team in protest of Andy's demotion. Meanwhile, Loren schemes to recruit his cousin, Uncle Jake, to run the concession stand selling pizza slices, in order to get a cut of the profits while Abbey tries to convince Jake to start a book program with his restaurant.
7	7	"For Whom the Bell's Toll"	Peter Lauer	Rodney Barnes	March 24, 2016	0.356
The teachers go into panic when the school board superintendent, who is running for mayor, arrives to evaluate them for the purpose of selecting one to be fired. After realizing that the superintendent plans on firing him, Billy desperately tries to manipulate Loren into a scenario where he'll get fired instead. Andy meanwhile, tired of being picked on, is given a puppet by the drama teacher (Mary Lynn Rajskub) to help him articulate his anger, with nasty results.
8	8	"Wet Dreams May Come"	Evan Nix & Adam Nix	Joey Slamon	March 31, 2016	0.343
Shoemaker begins to have erotic dreams of himself having sex with Loren, which cause him to seek out help from the school's drama teacher (Mary Lynn Rajskub), who tells him that the best way to stop the dreams is to proposition Loren. Meanwhile, a local police officer (Michael Madsen) has been assigned to the school for a classified investigation. Shoemaker and Abbey desperately seek to find out what the police officer is investigating, while Fairbell befriends the police officer and discovers that the officer is actually blind and was assigned to the school until his retirement.
9	9	"K-Pop Goes the Weasel"	Bobcat Goldthwait	Andrew Orvedahl & Joey Slamon	April 7, 2016	0.322
After Fairbell, Loren, and Shoemaker receive an anonymous death threat, the three plus Quinn and Abbey find themselves locked in the high school and pursued by a masked student. When Abbey is found dead, Quinn confronts the killer while the others flee at which point, he discovers that the entire scenario is the work of the senior class and Abbey, as their senior prank against the three and was conceived by Bryce. Watching them on hidden camera making fun of him, Quinn agrees to let the prank continue. However, when Fairbell turns on Shoemaker and Loren (who were planning on killing Fairbell because he would "slow them down") and lock them in the gym, where they turn each other before Quinn shows up to stop them only for Fairbell to stab Quinn when he tries to save the two.
10	10	"Take a Wonka on the Wild Side"	Bobcat Goldthwait	Adam Cayton-Holland & Ben Roy	April 14, 2016	0.309
Quinn informs the gang that the theme for the senior prom is Candyland while also informing them that they are all required to attend as chaperones as well as bring dates. Abbey and Fairbell agree to go together as friends, as do Quinn and a reluctant Loren, who only agrees because he couldn't find a date. Shoemaker, reeling from his wife leaving him, decides to get his old band back together for the prom. Things soon get out of hand, however, when the candy Quinn ordered is revealed to be laced with pot and a student starts to give birth in the locker room while Quinn is a no show. While Abbey, Shoemaker and Fairbell deliver the baby, Loren keeps the stoned stutents entertained by deejaying the dance. At the end of the night, Superintendent Carson arrives and informs them that Quinn was arrested for accidentally exposing himself in front of the students (as seen in the previous episode) and that he is naming Tammy interim principal. The gang congratulate Tammy who orders them to clean up the gym.

=== Season 2 (2016) ===
No. overall	No. in season	Title	Directed by	Written by	Original release date	US viewers (millions)
11	1	"Rod Man Out"	Peter Lauer	Andrew Orvedahl	October 6, 2016	0.339
The gang returns after a lackluster summer and are quickly met with a host of new changes when Tammy announces that she has rehired a now sober Rod. They struggle to adjust to the new Rod and quickly scheme to get him off the wagon. When Tammy finds out, she decides to finally fire the guys but a new principal arrives and gives them a clean slate and demotes Tammy back to secretary.
12	2	"Foreskin in the Game"	Nancy Hower	Adam Cayton-Holland	October 13, 2016	0.239
When Cattie, the new principal, recruits Fairbell as her new assistant, Loren feels left out and jealous. Meanwhile, Billy recruits Abbey to help him with complications from a reverse circumcision, which leads Cattie to suspect Abby is a witch.
13	3	"Plains High School Drifter"	Nancy Hower	Chris Marrs	October 20, 2016	0.242
When Cattie hires a former Denver Bronco to be the new football coach, the entire school gets caught up in hero worship except for Billy, who is fired for refusing to remove players from academic probation and poses as a female substitute to get his job back, and Tammy, who suspects (correctly) that the new coach is robbing the school blind. Meanwhile, Abbey is thrilled to make friends with the new female substitute, completely unaware that it's Billy in disguise, and Loren tries to prove his mettle as assistant football coach.
14	4	"8 Mile High"	Peter Lauer	Adam Cayton-Holland	October 27, 2016	N/A
Loren becomes obsessed with rap battles and assembles a crew consisting of himself, Shoemaker and Fairbell to compete. Meanwhile, a lonely Abbey finds herself getting caught up in the gang life and Shoemaker tries to connect with Rod now that he's dating Rod's mother.
15	5	"White Guilt Trip"	Matt Sohn	Ben Roy	November 10, 2016	0.256
After a racist piece of school history comes to light, Shoemaker volunteers to host a group of Native American students and ends up going overboard on political correctness. Abbey, temporarily shut out of the library, volunteers to help Fairbell teach his health class. Meanwhile, Loren and Rod start their own microbrewery on school grounds.
16	6	"The Trial of Geoffrey Quinn"	Bobcat Goldthwait	Andrew Orvedahl & Joey Slamon	November 10, 2016	0.191
Quinn finally receives his day in court which quickly turns into a circus when Quinn turns down a plea deal (a slap on the wrist and a fine), and then waives his right to a trial by jury (because the jurors were all like him). The prosecution quickly dismantles Abbey, Fairbell and Shoemaker on the stand leading Quinn to dismiss his lawyers and call Loren as his key witness. However, the prosecution breaks him as well. In the end, though, the judge finds no intent and Quinn is acquitted. Meanwhile, Cattie tries to improve the school's image in the press and pays Leslie to clean up the school and make it and the students look perfect which leads Rod, having just awakened from torching his and Loren's microbrewery, to believe it's 2025 and the school's been taken over by North Korea, a notion Tammy does nothing to discourage.
17	7	"Detergent Dawn"	Bobcat Goldthwait	Dean Lorey	November 17, 2016	0.151
Loren finally finishes his novel but it's accidentally printed out in the library. The book becomes a hit amongst the students but problems arise when Cattie proclaims the book as smut and bans it. Shoemaker, sensing an opportunity, becomes Loren's agent and tries to market the book. Abbey, however, is inspired by Quinn, now the school janitor, to pirate the book. When a student claims to have written the book and Abbey hosts a Q&A with him, Loren finally reveals himself as the author, causing Cattie to have a breakdown. Quinn feigns outrage at Loren and Abbey and Cattie concedes the principal job to him.
18	8	"A New Dog In The Yard"	Peter Lauer	Ian McLees	November 17, 2016	0.112
Everyone welcomes Quinn back as principal but Quinn is still struggling to readjust to life outside of prison. After being attacked by Quinn for making prison jokes, Shoemaker feels emasculated and overcompensates by taking testosterone shots. Fairbell takes over as wrestling coach but goes overboard and turns it into a pro wrestling circus while Abbey starts dating the other school's coach. Loren, too, starts dating and looks for romantic advice but soon realizes he's dating the ex-wife of Abbey's new boyfriend. Meanwhile, Tammy looks for ways to help Quinn readjust to civilian life.
19	9	"Normal Activity"	Bobcat Goldthwait	Andrew Orvedahl & Joey Slamon	December 1, 2016	0.150
Quinn recruits Loren, Shoemaker, Fairbell, Abbey and Phil to have an overnight stakeout at the school to discover who's been spray painting pentagrams. Things get out of hand, though, when Fairbell is seemingly possessed, leading to Quinn and Abbey staging an exorcism, and Shoemaker's girlfriend, Doris, mysteriously dies, prompting he and Loren to hide the body after Shoemaker keeps getting texts from her. In the end, Fairbell's possession is revealed to just be a caffeine overdose and Rod reveals Doris had syphilis, which is what killed her. Phil reveals that he's the one painting the pentagrams, as he is a practicing Satanist, but nobody believes him.
20	10	"Elect-ile Dysfunction"	Jay Karas	Ben Roy	December 1, 2016	N/A
It's Election Day in Denver and Quinn recruits the gang to count votes. However, Loren, Shoemaker and Abbey get caught up watching their favorite show and leave the vote counting to Fairbell, who starts recounting every time he hears a different number. Meanwhile, Tammy keeps getting rebuffed at her attempts to vote. Finally, the votes are counted but result in a three way tie, leaving the fate of the election in Tammy's hands. However, before the results are announced, they are preempted by the gang's show.
21	11	"Mid-Bryce Crisis"	Jay Karas	Anne Gregory	December 8, 2016	0.190
Abbey has a mid-life crisis when she is invited to her sister's wedding and starts dating Bryce, who has dropped out of college to be a singer/songwriter. Meanwhile, Quinn announces that there will be no senior prank this year in order to avoid a repeat of last year's debacle. When the guys see Bryce has returned, they assume he has returned to help the senior class with their prank and plan a preemptive strike in revenge. Abbey breaks up with Bryce and the boys' plan backfires, leading Rod to decide to fake his death.
22	12	"Graduation"	Bobcat Goldthwait	Joey Slamon & Kate Heckman	December 8, 2016	0.158
It's graduation time and Quinn announces that recently elected mayor Gill Nash is going to be the graduation speaker, which prompts Abbey to start a protest. Shoemaker, who has been living in the janitor's closet, tries to supplement his income by selling catalog products. Meanwhile, Loren has a new girlfriend but Quinn soon reveals to Abby that she is a hooker he hired for Loren. Also, budget cuts have forced Quinn to fire Fairbell, who tries a number of different ways to get his job back. All these events culminate at the graduation ceremony when Shoemaker's faulty products cause the kids to faint, Fairbell lights himself on fire and Abbey douses him in pig's blood, and Quinn reveals the truth about the prostitute when he is arrested. Loren is touched that Quinn would do that for him and finally proclaims Quinn his best friend before proposing to the prostitute, who accepts. Mayor Nash, meanwhile, appoints Fairbell as the principal, much to everyone's horror, and Nash is revealed to be sabotaging the school with Leslie so he can tear it down and build condos.

=== Season 3 (2019) ===
No. overall	No. in season	Title	Directed by	Written by	Original release date	US viewers (millions)
23	1	"All's Fairbell"	Nancy Hower	Ben Roy	January 14, 2019	0.163
Defying everyone's expectations, Fairbell excels as the new principal of Smoot. However, Loren, Abby and Shoemaker take advantage of his new power. When the new guidance counselor, Steven Sweeney, takes notice, the gang goes to great lengths to scare him off. Meanwhile, Shoemaker grows a ponytail, which everyone makes fun of, and Fairbell tries to juggle his duty as principal with his duty as girls' volleyball coach. In the end, Fairbell decides to step down as principal and the guidance counselor promises revenge on the gang.
24	2	"The Running of the Bullies"	Jay Karas	Andrew Weinberg	January 21, 2019	0.145
Quinn returns as principal and puts Abby in charge of an Anti-Bullying awareness program. Shoemaker is given charge of the bullies and tries to give them the shelter of free speech, but this backfires when they start bullying him. Loren, meanwhile, finds himself an unwitting hero to the bullied students, who seek refuge in his classroom and turn it into a haven for intellect. Elsewhere, Abby becomes drunk with power and becomes a mean girl over the anti-bullying committee, prompting Quinn, who has been using Sweeney as his personal therapist, to remove her and restore order by letting the bullies and the nerds into the same classes again. Fairbell, who has been binge watching nature documentaries, narrates the events.
25	3	"You Can't Go Homecoming Again"	Steven Tsuchida	Andrew Orvedahl	January 28, 2019	0.165
It's homecoming time at Smoot and the gang have been chosen as faculty advisors to the class float committees. Abbey, upset over a proposed mammogram tax by Mayor Nash, uses the freshman float as protest but the immature freshmen simply make a naked woman instead. Loren is in charge of the sophomores but, when his idea gor a hip-hop tribute is shot down in favor of a school pride float, he trades with Fairbell, who tried to do a Star Wars themed float with the juniors and kept getting cease and desist orders from Disney. Instead, the juniors do a tribute to Marcus, a fellow student who has a small heart and a love of hip-hop, which endears him to Loren. Shoemaker is put in charge of the seniors and tricks them into fixing up a deathtrap of a minivan he bought at a police auction but they cannibalize it to make their float, instead. Quinn is excited to learn that the parade will be covered by the local news but Tammy says they only want to cover it because it will be a disaster, which it inevitably is.
26	4	"A Smoot Holiday Coincidence"	Nancy Hower	Chris Marrs	February 4, 2019	0.162
Loren rallies the other teachers to raise money for a heart transplant for Marcus. Quinn donates money he had planned on using for a Smoot High Christmas display and Leslie uses it to run a bake sale. When the $1400 the raise is revealed to be too little for the transplant, they take the money (and the school credit card) and use it to finance a black tie benefit auction. While the auction is a rousing success, the credit card bill leaves them with only $5000. Quinn suggests taking the money and using it to fund a Christmas lights display for a local contest, the grand prize being enough to pay for Marcus's operation. However, when Shoemaker's wife ends up giving birth in the middle of the nativity display, Marcus drives off in Sweeney's Miata, having gotten the keys out of Sweeney's jacket, and gets into a crash. Marcus goes to jail, where the state will pay for his operation, and the school wins the lights contest, meaning they can put the prize money into the school.
27	5	"Escapegoats"	Jay Karas	Lisa Best	February 11, 2019	0.171
Quinn gathers the faculty in the library for a team building exercise, an escape room, that Sweeney recommended. Once the gang are locked in to their escape room by Tammy, Sweeney reveals that the escape room was a ruse to distract the gang while the rest of the faculty demands that Quinn fire them. While Quinn and the faculty debate, the gang confronts a hungover Loren over having had his bachelor party the night before and not having invited them as he only considers them "work friends". In an attempt to escape the escape room, the gang discover Rod has been living in the boiler room since faking his death. Upon returning to the escape room, the gang thinks they've sprung a gas leak and end up making amends before passing out. When they come to, Sweeney reveals that they have enough votes to fire them, by a single vote. Rod, however, reveals himself and gets hired back on as a lunch lady in order to vote to save the gang. Quinn, still thinking the escape room is real, removes a radiator from the library wall, triggering an actual gas leak.
28	6	"Taco Tuesday"	Peter Lauer	Andrew Weinberg	February 18, 2019	0.137
The gang are excited about Taco Tuesday at Smoot until Rod reveals that, due to a mixup with the food delivery, they will be having chicken nuggets instead. Everyone starts to panic as the shock to their system of not having their weekly tacos causes everyone to start experiencing digestive distress. With Quinn away at a conference and Tammy taking a personal day, the rest of the faculty turns to the gang to fix the problem. Elsewhere, Tammy goes to visit her son at St. Lawrence Prep when she is informed that she needs $8,000 to keep him enrolled (and out of Smoot). She goes to break the news to him that he will have to transfer to public school but upon seeing the elite private school, which is the complete opposite of Smoot (including competent alternate versions of Loren, Abbey, Shoemaker, Fairbell, Quinn and a more successful version of herself as principal), she decides to sell her car to get the necessary funds to keep him enrolled. Back at Smoot, the gang have called in an emergency shipment of tacos but the delivery drivers refuse to hand them over without payment. The gang ineffectively tries to subdue one of the drivers and take the shipment. Fortunately, Tammy arrives and sets things right, purchasing some tacos from a restaurant down the street. The gang appreciatively praise Tammy for her hard work until she reveals that tomorrow is Cesar Chavez day and they'll be having more tacos, instead of their usual chicken nuggets, which causes the gang to lash out at Tammy.
29	7	"One-Ding Wonder"	Evan Nix & Adam Nix	Adam Cayton-Holland	February 25, 2019	0.136
When Wingding Kid, a Smoot student and internet sensation, pranks Shoemaker for one of his videos, Shoemaker becomes an instant celebrity and relishes his fifteen minutes of fame. Trying to capitalize on his time in the spotlight, he makes merchandise to sell to his students but is soon cast aside in favor of a new Wingding Kid video. Meanwhile, jealous of Shoemaker's newfound fame, Loren and Abbey try to make a viral video of their own. Their first attempt backfires when Abbey uses the video to rant and Loren gets punched in the nose when he tries to prank Sweeney. For their second attempt, they recruit Uncle Jake as bait, planning to prank Wingding Kid. However, Shoemaker tries to sell his merchandise to Jake and, when Loren tries to get rid of Shoemaker, the whole gang end up in a fistfight on the Smoot lawn, a scene which is soon invaded by Wingding Kid. Later, while the gang relish the fact that they are part of Wingding Kid's most popular video to date, they are soon dismayed to learn that Wingding Kid has also made a commercial with Uncle Jake, promoting a new pizza named in his honor.
30	8	"Grisly Man"	Peter Lauer	Andrew Orvedahl	March 4, 2019	0.175
While setting up for a cross country meet, Loren, Abbey and Shoemaker ditch Rod and Fairbell to go exploring in the woods but soon get lost, forcing Rod and Fairbell to search for them. The trio soon stumble upon a cabin that they think belongs to a legendary serial killer but are soon trapped with the cabin's owner, Howard, when Shoemaker accidentally chops off one of Loren's toes. Meanwhile, Rod tracks the trio through the woods, his search becoming more serious when Fairbell stumbles on a human skeleton, but his efforts are hampered (and his sanity tested) by Fairbell's incompetence. The trio begins to suspect that Howard is the serial killer, especially after he reveals that he was once a high school teacher like them until it drove him into seclusion. Rod and Fairbell soon find their way to the cabin and Fairbell knocks Howard unconscious just before Loren reveals he discovered another human skull. They break into Howard's shed and find what appear to be several dismembered corpses and flee, running into Rod and Fairbell's traps, before running into (and ruining) the cross country meet. Howard explains that he is a forensic scientist and the bodies are donated cadavers that he uses to study human decomposition. Later, Howard is revealed to truly be the killer when he has kidnapped a hiker the group encountered earlier.
31	9	"Those Who Could've"	Alex Reid	Chris Marrs	March 11, 2019	0.130
Smoot is reinstated into a student-teacher program and even the gang get assigned to mentor future educators. Loren is jealous that his is cooler and more talented than he is, Abbey is dismayed that hers is an elderly woman, Fairbell becomes convinced his is a robot but Shoemaker takes a liking to his when he discovers she's very similar to him, even being a fan of his old band. When Leslie tells the gang that the rest of the teachers use the student-teachers as free labor by threatening bad evaluations, they take to the idea. However, Shoemaker takes pity on his and lets the truth slip, leading the student-teachers to rebel. The gang try to break them by revealing the truth about teaching at a public high school but the idealistic young teachers don't care so the gang falsely report them for misconduct, leading Smoot to being banned from the program again. At the end, Abbey's student-teacher passes away before Abbey presents her with her librarian certification.
32	10	"SKAppily Ever After"	Ross Novie	Adam Cayton-Holland	March 18, 2019	0.190
Loren's wedding plans fall apart and he panics so Quinn recruits the rest of the faculty to put together a last minute wedding for Loren and Jade. Abbey takes charge of the planning, Quinn is asked to officiate and Fairbell is assigned to tie the cans to the car. Shoemaker, however, refuses to help book a band for the weddin, especially since Loren wants to book a ska band that Capitalist Emulsification once had a bitter feud with. He is convinced, however, when Loren convinced Shoemaker that he'll be in line for best man if he pulls this off. However, things begin to fall apart when Quinn's minister license is revoked, Fairbell tries to get cans from hobos and the ska band won't perform without a new dancing guy. Quinn gets Phil to ordain him as a Satanist minister so he can officiate, Shoemaker volunteers to be the dancing guy for the ska band and Fairbell ends up stealing the needed cans from the hobos. Meanwhile, Abbey volunteers for the final fitting for Jade's dress but gets stuck in it so Jade wears one of her prostitute outfits, instead. The ceremony starts off beautifully but falls apart when Jade reveals that she's quitting the escort game to have a normal life with Loren and discovers that he was only interested in marrying a prostitute. Jade calls off the wedding and Loren drives off in despair.
33	11	"Big Ol' Scams"	Krysia Plonka	Janette Timm	March 25, 2019	0.159
Loren is still bummed after getting left at the altar and Abbey is feeling unappreciated by the gang. When Sweeney holds a career fair for Smoot's non-college bound students, it leads the gang to question their life choices. Loren is charmed into considering real estate by a man of similar attitude while Shoemaker is lured in by a thinly-veiled pyramid scheme by the offer of a free place to live and recruits Fairbell, as well. Sweeney, sensing an opportunity to get rid of the gang, offers to help Loren pass his real estate exams. Shoemaker and Fairbell try to recruit Quinn in the pyramid scheme but Quinn is dismayed by Loren's decision to leave Smoot. Eventually, Shoemaker learns he was scammed, although Fairbell still believes the scam, and Loren failed his real estate exam so they all remain in their jobs at Smoot. Abbey, however, having been ignored and dismissed by Quinn and the gang all week, quits her job. Fairbell, mistaking a recycling bin for an "ascension pod", gets dumped in a garbage truck.
34	12	"Abbey's Road"	Steven Tsuchida	Lisa Best	April 1, 2019	0.114
Quinn announces that the library will be shut down now that Abbey has resigned and Loren volunteers to take over when he learns that the job pays $15,000 a year more than he was making. However, the gang agrees that their dynamic is off without a fourth so they hold auditions for a replacement. Unfortunately, their only applicant is Quinn. Meanwhile, Abbey is growing in her new job as a meter maid and also growing her connection with her online pen pal. However, Loren starts to feel left out by the others, especially when Quinn starts becoming cooler than him, and realizes they need Abbey back. When Abbey goes to meet her online pen pal, she is dismayed to learn it is Mayor Gil Nash and Loren convinces her to return to her librarian job, restoring the balance at Smoot.
35	13	"Yes We Scan"	Peter Lauer	Ben Roy	April 8, 2019	0.129
Sweeney and Tammy learn that Leslie is working with Mayor Nash to sabotage Smoot so they can build luxury condos on the spot. When Smoot fails on the standardized tests, Nash can close the school and tear it down. Quinn, dismayed that he was only rehired as principal to help torpedo Smoot, takes peyote and Tammy joins him, leading them on a drug-induced quest to plant an apple tree. Meanwhile, Sweeney convinces the gang to help him save Smoot by preparing the students for the test. However, the students fail, leading Sweeney and the gang to conduct a heist to swap Smoot's failing results with a forged set of passing results. The plan goes off the rails, however, when they notice the tight security surrounding the test results, so they enlist Smoot's best hacker to get them in. Things are further complicated when Abbey accidentally shreds the forged test sheets, so Loren switches Smoot's results with a more competent school. However, they are tased by security on their way out, leading Shoemaker and Fairbell to pull off a sloppy, improvised rescue. Smoot is successfully saved but Nash announces he's firing the faculty and replacing them with a better staff as Smoot is being turned into a magnet school for gifted students. However, Abbey convinces Nash to change his mind by revealing his true, liberal nature. Tammy reveals that Quinn was arrested for shoplifting and, it being his third strike, will go to jail for life. She is more dismayed, however, to learn that St. Lawrence Prep, her son's school, will be shut down and he will have to attend Smoot.

== Reception ==
=== Critical response ===
For the first season, the review aggregator Rotten Tomatoes reported a 40% approval rating with an average rating of 5.9/10, based on 10 reviews, with a mixed response from critics: Allison Shoemaker from The A.V. Club gave season 1 a rating "B+", writing: "Cayton-Holland, Orvedahl, and Roy seem to be having the time of their lives, and it's almost impossible to watch people having that much fun without getting in the spirit of things.", while Mark A. Perigard from the American daily newspaper Boston Herald rated the show a "D", reporting: "Watching Those Who Can't is like being stuck in Saturday detention. It feels like forever.". Metacritic graded the series a weighted average rating of 57 out of 100, based on 8 critics, indicating "mixed or average reviews".
