= Illegal Pete's =

Burrito restaurant chain in the United States

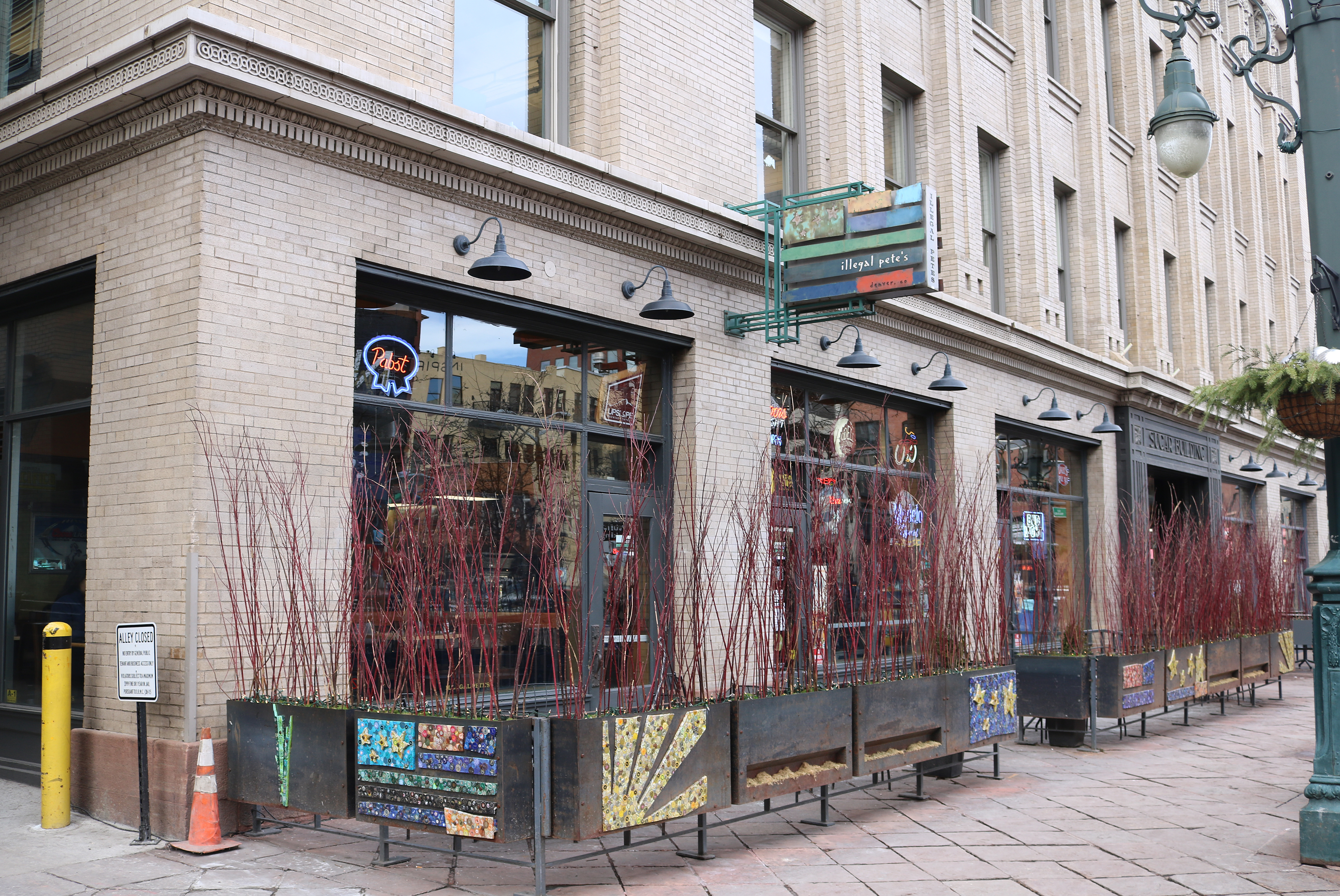
- Denver LoDo location.
- Company type: Private
- Industry: Restaurants
- Founded: Boulder, Colorado (1995)
- Founder: Pete Turner
- Headquarters: Denver, Colorado, U.S.
- Number of locations: 14
- Area served: Colorado, Arizona
- Website: www.illegalpetes.com

Illegal Pete's is a Colorado-based group of quick-service, fast-casual "Mission Style" burrito restaurants that takes inspiration from burritos popularized in San Francisco in the 1960s and 1970s.

== History ==
The first Illegal Pete's location was opened up by Pete Turner on August 15, 1995, on The Hill in Boulder; Turner said that starting the business nearly killed him. Since then, the business has grown to include seven locations in Denver, two in Boulder, one in Fort Collins, and two in Arizona, one in Tucson and one in Tempe. Turner seeks old, historic buildings to transform into his locations and has done so with places like Mama's Cafe, and the vintage shop at Main Gate. The corporate headquarters of Illegal Pete's was in the historic Denver landmark, the Daniels & Fisher Tower in downtown Denver and now is located in a loft on Broadway near their S. Broadway restaurant.

The restaurant has become popular with hipsters, college students, athletes, and musicians nationwide: in fact, international pop songwriter Jack Johnson first received the call saying Universal Records wanted to sign him while he was eating a burrito at Illegal Pete's.

In 2014, Illegal Pete's attracted controversy from proponents of Race Forward's "Drop the I-Word" campaign, which seeks to eliminate the word "illegal" from American vernacular because of possible racial connotations. Two small groups of Latino activists demanded that the word "illegal" be dropped from the name of the restaurant, first in Fort Collins and again upon the opening of the Tucson location. Founder Pete Turner has refuted any possible racial connotations of his business name in the media and in a public statement defending the use of the word.

== Culture ==
Illegal Pete's is involved in several facets of community involvement, including charity fund raisers like the "Smother Autism" campaign in April 2012, which raised money for The Joshua School, "a Colorado-based, non-profit educational therapeutic day treatment center for children with an autism spectrum disorder and related developmental disabilities," or the award-winning Pete's Pints campaigns, which raise money for local bands.

In September 2010, Illegal Pete's started the Starving Artist program, which feeds out-of-town musicians for free at Illegal Pete's when they come through Denver or Boulder to play a show. Illegal Pete's was voted as the Best Place to Eat and Hang Out with Rock Stars by the annual Best of Westword of 2011. Illegal Pete's began throwing Starving Artist SXSW showcases in Austin in March 2011. Pete Turner was featured in a front-page article of the Denver Post on businesses spending marketing money on representing Denver at SXSW.

In July 2011, Illegal Pete's launched "Greater Than" artist collective, a non-traditional record label that works with Colorado bands. The label was the brain child of Pete Turner and Suburban Home Records owner for 17 years, Virgil Dickerson. Bands signed to the label included Denver darkwave band Snake Rattle Rattle Snake, cello prog pop songwriter Ian Cooke, active rock Denver darlings The Epilogues, the belovedly crass comedian Ben Roy, and songstress Esmé Patterson.

Travel Channel's Food Paradise aired a segment August 26, 2014 about the restaurant.
