= Ben Roy =

American comedian and musician

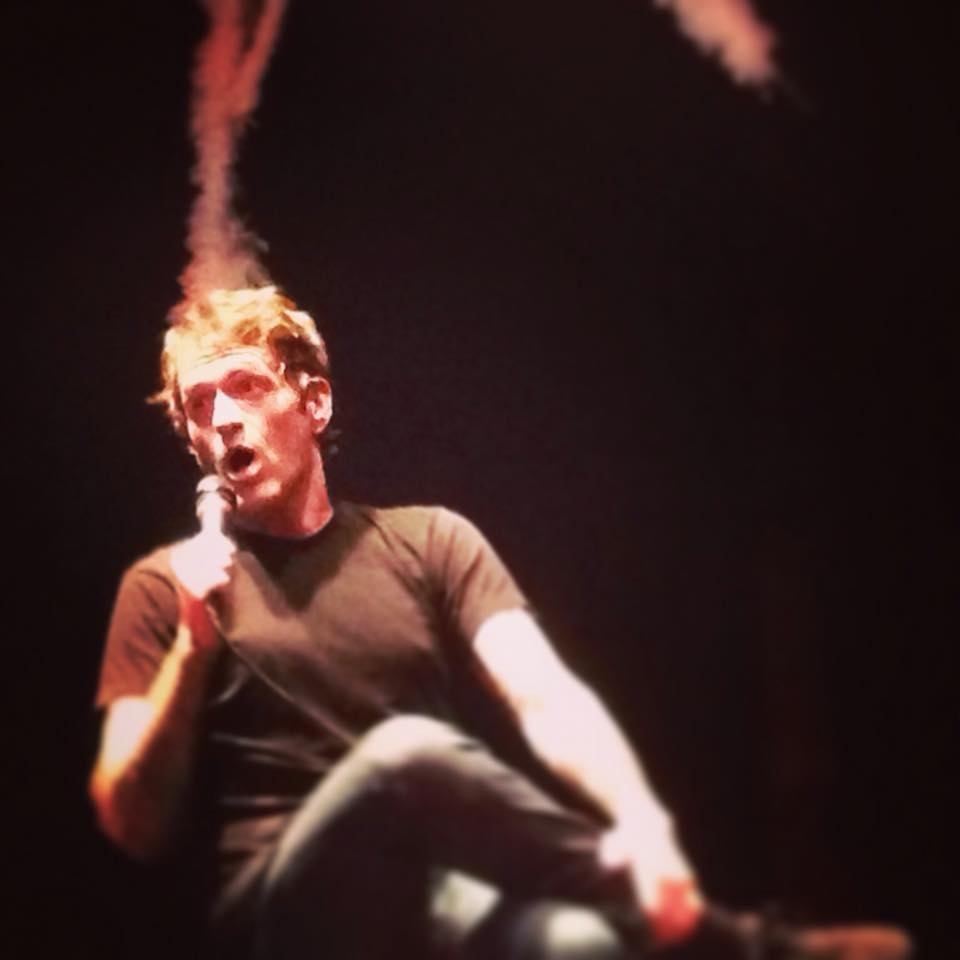
- Ben Roy performing at The Grawlix show
- Born: June 18, 1979 (age 47)

Comedy career
- Years active: 2004–present
- Genres: Alternative comedy Punk rock

Ben Roy (born June 18, 1979) is an American comedian and musician originally from Winthrop, Maine, who now lives in Denver, Colorado. Heavily tattooed, and known for his "spittle-flecked rants" on stage, Roy has been compared to Bill Hicks and Lewis Black. Roy is a member of The Grawlix, a trio of Denver comedians who produce a monthly live comedy show and web series. He stars on the TruTV show Those Who Can't. He is also a singer who has fronted several Denver-area punk rock bands.

== Career ==
=== Comedian ===
Roy started in the world of standup comedy when he entered a Comedy Works new talent night in early 2004. A Comedy Works manager snuck him into a professional competition a few months later, where he placed second to comedian Josh Blue, who would go on to national fame as winner of Last Comic Standing.

In the summer of 2010, Roy was invited to perform in the "New Faces" division of the Montreal Just for Laughs Comedy Festival, and invited back for its 2012 Nasty Show. He has been selected to perform at the Boston Comedy Festival, the Laughing Skull Comedy Festival, the Aspen Rooftop Comedy Festival, and the MTV Comedy Showcase. He's also been featured on HBO's Funny as Hell series; in the John Wenzel Book Mock Stars: Indie Comedy and the Dangerously Funny (alongside comedy greats like Patton Oswalt and Fred Armisen); and on the Comedy Central Show Adam DeVine's House Party.

His debut standup album, I Got Demons, was released in 2012 and ranked one of the 10 Best Comedy Albums of the year by Laughspin. His second standup album, No Enlightenment in Sobriety, was released April 15, 2014. Roy recorded his third standup album on March 8 and March 11, 2015 at Comedy Works.

=== The Grawlix ===
Early on in his comedy career, Roy met fellow Denver comedians Andrew Orvedahl and Adam Cayton-Holland. After performing together for a few years, the trio officially formed The Grawlix. The troupe performs a monthly show at The Bug Theatre in Denver, consisting of standup sets from each of the principals, a variety of national guest comedians, and screenings of their web series "The Grawlix", produced by The Nix brothers.

==== Those Who Can't ====
The Grawlix also teamed with The Nix brothers to produce a pilot for Amazon in June 2012 called Those Who Can't, about three inept Denver high school teachers. While Amazon eventually passed on the pilot, TruTV paid the trio to rewrite and re-film it in December 2014. In February 2015, the network announced they were ordering 10 episodes of the series. TruTV went on to air 3 seasons of Those Who Can't between 2016 and 2019. The show was eventually canceled on April 24, 2019.

=== Music ===
While still in Maine, Roy first formed punk band The Mendicants before fronting hardcore band Thousand Year Suffering. Roy has said he's been in "16 or 17 bands since the age of 16," including Denver punk bands 29th Street Disciples and The Fire Drills. Roy now fronts the band SPELLS that formed in 2012 with guitarist Chuck Coffey, bassist Don Bersell, and drummer Rob Burleson. The foursome play high-energy, melodic punk that they describe as "vacation rock." The group is known for their nontraditional approach to both their tour schedule and releases—in 2013, they issued a 45, multiple digital downloads, and a cassette with previously unreleased tracks. Ben started his musical career as the original singer of the 90s band Dishwalla.

== Personal life ==
Roy was married to photographer Crystal Allen for 19 years. The pair met in Maine and moved to Denver in 2002. They have one son, Milo, born in 2005. Roy has been vocal about his struggle with alcoholism and has been sober since 2010.

== Discography ==
- Pet Your Friends (1995)
- I Got Demons (2012)
- No Enlightenment in Sobriety (2014)
- Ooze Your Delusions (2018)
- Take the Sandwich (2021)
