= Kyle Kinane =

American comedian (born 1976)

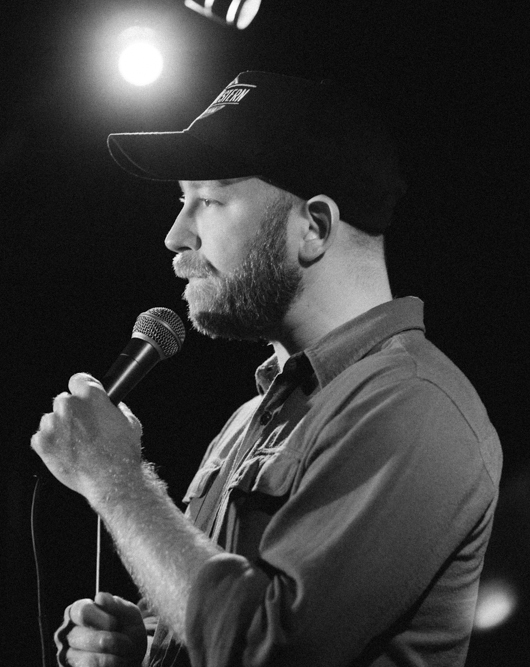
- Kyle Kinane in 2013
- Born: Kyle Christian Kinane; December 23, 1976 (age 49); Addison, Illinois, U.S.

Comedy career
- Medium: Stand-up comedy; acting
- Website: https://kylekinane.com/

Kyle Christian Kinane (born December 23, 1976) is an American stand-up comedian and actor from Addison, Illinois.

== Career ==
Kinane's first television appearance was on The Nanny playing "Young Roger Clinton".

His debut album Death of the Party, recorded at the Upright Citizens Brigade Theatre in Los Angeles and released in 2010 on Aspecialthing Records, was met with critical acclaim. Kinane was named in Variety's "Ten Comics to Watch in 2010".

Kinane has had a longstanding relationship with the cable channel Comedy Central, including serving as the voice for their on-air announcements from 2011 until 2018. His first Comedy Central Presents half-hour special was on February 25, 2011. Other Comedy Central programs on which he has appeared include Drunk History (on which he retold the story of the Haymarket affair and the Voskhod 2 mission while drunk), the game show @midnight, which he won seven times, and the 2014 animated series TripTank.

Kinane's first stand-up comedy DVD special, Whiskey Icarus, was released in 2012. His second stand-up DVD special, "I Liked His Old Stuff Better," was released in 2015.

Kinane has performed his stand-up on television programs Last Call with Carson Daly, Live at Gotham, Conan and The Tonight Show Starring Jimmy Fallon. He has opened for comedians Patton Oswalt and Daniel Tosh on tour.

He has appeared on many audio and video podcasts, including Office Hours Live with Tim Heidecker, Quorators, Comedy Bang! Bang!, Doug Loves Movies, Getting Doug with High, The Grandma's Virginity Podcast, The Nerdist Podcast, Comedy Film Nerds, Stop Podcasting Yourself, The Adam Carolla Show, You Made It Weird with Pete Holmes, All Growz Up with Melinda Hill WTF with Marc Maron, and The Art of Wrestling with Colt Cabana. He was also featured in the web-series Outside Comedy, where he discussed his love of mountain biking. He appears in comedian Ray Harrington's 2015 documentary Be a Man.

Kinane also co-hosted his own podcasts, including The Boogie Monster with comedian Dave Stone and No Accounting for Taste with comedian Shane Torres. The Boogie Monster started in August 2016 and went on hiatus in May 2023, returning in January 2026. No Accounting For Taste ran from April 2022 to June 2024. Kinane cited feelings of burnout and an oversaturation of comedian-hosted podcasts as his reason for ending both shows in a March 2026 episode of Boogie Monster.

In 2019 Kinane starred in the music video for "Disappear" by punk band Off With Their Heads.

In 2025, Kinane's special Dirt Nap explored the relationship between the Fast and Furious franchise and a feral cat.

== Discography ==
Year	Album
2010	Death of the Party
2012	Whiskey Icarus
2015	I Liked His Old Stuff Better
2016	Loose in Chicago
2020	Trampoline in a Ditch
2023	Shocks and Struts
2024	Dirt Nap

== Filmography ==
=== Film ===
Year	Title	Role	Notes
2009	Funny People	Paparazzi at Medical Center	
2011	Cheerleader Massacre 2	Jimmy	Direct-to-video
2013	Epic	Biker Dude	Voice
2015	Hell and Back	Kyle the Demon	Voice
2017	Random Tropical Paradise	Kenny Crandall	
2017	Izzy Gets the F*ck Across Town	Rabbit	
2017	The House	Garvey	
2022	Aqua Teen Forever: Plantasm	Elric in IT	Voice

=== Television ===
Year	Title	Role	Notes
2009	The Legend of Neil	Chief Elf Cop	Episode: "Death in Store"
2011	Workaholics	Sewer Dwayne	Episode: "Karl's Wedding"
2012	The Life & Times of Tim	The Shadow	Episode: "Pudding Boy/The Celebrity Who Shall Remain Nameless"
2012	Aqua Teen Hunger Force	Dr. Balthazar / Doctor	2 episodes
2012	Bob's Burgers	Rat Daddy	Episode: "Ear-Sy Rider"
2012–2013	Regular Show	Doorman / Club Manager #2 / Club Manager #5	2 episodes
2013	Those Who Can't	Rod Knorr	Television film
2013	Comedy Bang! Bang!	Lenny Spruce	Episode: "Andy Dick Wears a Black Suit Jacket & Skinny Tie"
2014–2016	TripTank	Various roles	7 episodes
2015	Clinical Trials	Kyle Walsh	4 episodes
2015	Lucas Bros. Moving Co.	Fred Durst	Episode: "Nutopia"
2015	Adventure Time	Cloud Dance / Cloud Dancer	3 episodes
2016	Idiotsitter	Pony	Episode: "Mother's Day"
2016	Love	Eric	2 episodes
2016–2017	Right Now Kapow	Ice Cream	26 episodes
2016–2019	Those Who Can't	Rod Knorr	17 episodes
2018	Teachers	Ned Coop	Episode: "Hot Deadly Dad"
2018–2022	Paradise PD	Bullet	40 episodes
2023-Present	Big City Greens	Dweezil	
2023	Hailey's On It!	Chuck Power / Darryl	Episode: "Frankly Fabulous/The Pin is Mightier Than the Swole"
