= Comedy Works =

Comedy club in Denver, Colorado

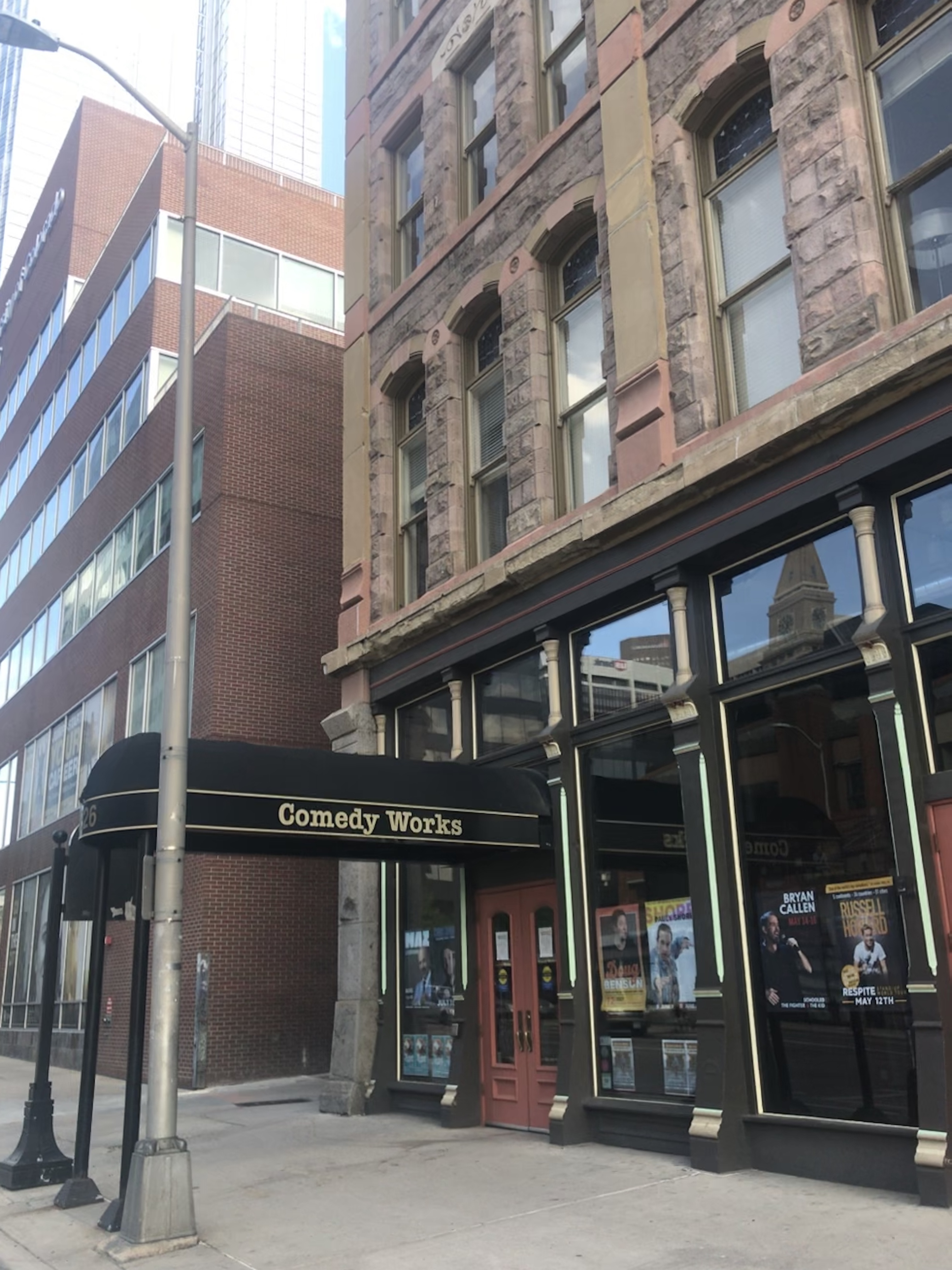
Comedy Works' entrance at the downtown Denver location

Comedy Works is a stand-up comedy club with two locations in the Denver, Colorado metropolitan area. The downtown club opened in September 1981 and is located in Larimer Square in Denver. The south club, which opened September 2008, is part of The Landmark development in Greenwood Village.

== History ==
Originally known as the Comedy Shoppe, owners George McKelvey (the "Godfather" of Denver's comedy community), Doug Olson, and Edd Nichols renamed the venue Comedy Works in 1981 and moved it to a basement space of the Granite/Graham-Clayton building in Larimer Square. In September of that year, Comedy Works became the first nightclub in Denver to have professional comedy on a full-time basis. Since then, Comedy Works has grown to include the south club in The Landmark neighborhood which features a restaurant, a lounge, and a ballroom.

Over their histories, the two clubs have featured comedians such as Colorado-native Roseanne Barr (who started her stand-up career at a 1980 Comedy Shoppe open-mic night), Jerry Seinfeld, Ellen DeGeneres, Chris Rock, George Lopez, and Lewis Black. Several comedians have recorded CDs at the Larimer Square location including Kathleen Madigan (Shallow Happy Thoughts for the Soul in 2002), Dave Attell (Skanks for the Memories in 2003), and Josh Blue (Good Josh Bad Arm in 2005).

=== Ownership ===
Current owner Wende Curtis started as a cocktail waitress at a now-defunct Fort Collins, CO Comedy Works location. After graduating from Colorado State University, Curtis became a manager for the Fort Collins location, later managed a Tampa, FL Comedy Works, and turned around that club in the process. She later returned to Denver in 1993 to run the Larimer Square location. In 2001, with the parent company facing financial difficulties, Curtis and two partners bought the business and by 2003 she had bought out her partners.

== Other businesses ==
Comedy Works Entertainment is the booking arm of the business. Under the leadership of Mike Raftery, the company produces comedy concerts in larger venues around Denver and the state of Colorado. It also serves in a management capacity for comedians, including Josh Blue.
