= Channel 101 NY =

Channel 101: NY, formerly known as Channel 102, is a monthly live screening of five-minute-long "TV shows" in New York City, created by Tony Carnevale, with the blessings of Dan Harmon and Rob Schrab. Harmon and Schrab created Channel 101, the Los Angeles-based film festival that inspired Channel 101: NY.

Channel 101: NY launched on February 3, 2005 as Channel 102 at the Variety Underground showcase at the Parkside Lounge. For that debut screening, all pilots that were submitted which met the five-minute maximum length were accepted. Eleven were shown, and the top five became the first "prime time" shows of Channel 102.

== Concept and history ==
The concept is identical to that of Channel 101, and follows its model of operations. Anyone can submit a pilot using a private link or DV tape. The content, genre, and style of the show are entirely open as long as the length of the show is under five minutes. From all the submissions, only a portion is screened for the live audience.

Between three and seven new pilots join the previous months' prime time of five continuing shows. At the end of the screening, all audience members fill out "Executive Decision Ballots," checking off their five top shows. Only the shows with the highest five ratings will return next month with a new episode, all other shows are "cancelled."

The "Prime Time Panel" is made up of representatives from the shows with the highest audience vote totals from the previous month's screening. At the screening (which occurs roughly every month), the audience votes (or "renews") its top five favorite shows. The creators of those shows continue making new episodes each month until they fall from the top five, which means they have been "cancelled."

=== Screening locations ===
After leaving the Parkside Louge, Channel 102 held several screenings at the Upright Citizens Brigade Theatre (NYC) from March through September 2005. In November 2005, Channel 102 moved to the 192-seat Courthouse Theater at The Anthology Film Archives. Other past venues included Pianos Bar and Tribeca Cinemas. Channel 101: NY screened at the Upright Citizens Brigade Theatre at the UCBeast location at 153 E 3rd Street from 2012–2018, and most recently has screened regularly at the Spectacle Theater microcinema.

=== Changes to format ===
In November 2007, Kelly Kubik, Dan Harmon's former personal assistant and creative collaborator on many 101 shows, and Stephen Levinson moved to New York, Levinson replacing Will Hines as the "showrunner" of Channel 102. Levinson commenced several new initiatives including moving the screening from Tribeca Cinemas to Pianos' Bar, making entry free and rebranding Channel 102 as "Channel 101:NY" in order to draw the brands together. Ed Mundy then took control, and helped move the show to UCB East, where screenings are still held monthly.

== Notable personalities ==
- Tony Carnevale – Locked in A Closet, Purgatory
- Will Hines – The Fun Squad, Sexual Intercourse: American Style
- John Gemberling – Gemberling
- Curtis Gwinn – Gemberling
- Austin Bragg – Jesus Christ Supercop, The Defenders of Stan
- Hunter Christy – Jesus Christ Supercop, The Defenders of Stan
- Paul Gale – Animal Pick Up Artist
- Kirk Damato – My Wife the Ghost, Cakey! The Cake From Outer Space
- Jess Lane – Teen Homicide, The Jon & Jess Variety Hour
- Abbi Jacobson – Broad City
- Ilana Glazer – Broad City
- Randall Park – Dr. Miracles
- Mitch Magee – Sexual Intercourse: American Style, Mister Glasses, Welcome To My Study
- Karen Lurie – American Cookbook
- Nick Poppy – American Cookbook
- Shek Baker – Host
- Chris Prine – Scissor Cop
- Edward Mundy – Nice Brothers
- Matt Koff – 9AM Meeting, Host
- Nick Bernardone – Army Husbands
- Chioke Nassor – Titsburg
- Dan Opsal – Acting Reel Master Database
- Dan Markowitz – NWAR – (Engaged at Hamilton)
- Ellie Kemper – Sexual Intercourse: American Style, Mister Glasses
- Rachel Bloom – Army Husbands

== Notable shows ==
- The Fun Squad – The first #1 prime time show
- NWAR – Current longest-running show with 24 episodes
- NWAR – Longest consecutive streak at #1
- Gemberling – The original episodes were re-aired on Fuse, and a new version premiered on Cartoon Network's Adult Swim block as Fat Guy Stuck in Internet
- Sexual Intercourse: American Style – Longest-running show to never reach #1
- Shutterbugs – Created by Aziz Ansari and Rob Huebel, later to form the MTV sketch comedy show Human Giant
- I Love The '30s – Licensed to Comedy Central
- Broad City – Cancelled after one episode, but made into a TV show on Comedy Central starring Abbi Jacobson and Ilana Glazer
- Animals – Became a TV show on HBO which ran for three seasons

== See also ==
- Channel 101
