= Human Giant =

- The cast of Human Giant (from left to right), Huebel, Scheer and Ansari
- Genre: Sketch comedy
- Created by: Aziz Ansari; Rob Huebel; Paul Scheer; Jason Woliner
- Starring: Aziz Ansari; Rob Huebel; Paul Scheer
- Opening theme: "Romantic Rights" by Death from Above 1979
- Country of origin: United States
- Original language: English
- No. of seasons: 2
- No. of episodes: 16

Production
- Running time: 30 minutes (including commercials)
- Production companies: 3 Arts Entertainment; MTV Production Development

Original release
- Network: MTV
- Release: April 5, 2007 – April 15, 2008

Human Giant is a sketch comedy show starring writer/performers Aziz Ansari, Rob Huebel, and Paul Scheer, and directed primarily by Jason Woliner. The show ran for two seasons on MTV. In 2008, the group was offered a third season and was reportedly developing a feature film with Red Hour Productions, but these projects did not transpire due to Ansari's commitments to starring in the NBC show Parks and Recreation. In 2010, Ansari, Huebel and Scheer reunited to do a skit for the 2010 MTV Movie Awards.

== Premise ==
The show, which premiered on April 5, 2007, consists of short humorous videos. Some of the clips were first seen online such as "Shutterbugs", as part of Channel 101 NY, "Clell Tickle: Indie Marketing Guru", "The Illusionators" and an unaired skit called "Other Music".

== Production ==
Ansari, Huebel, Scheer, and Woliner began working together as the comedy group Human Giant in 2005. They gained a large following in the New York City comedy scene through live shows at the Upright Citizens Brigade and their weekly comedy show, Crash Test, and later expanded their sketches into short films. Their early digital videos "Shutterbugs" and "The Illusionators" became popular on MySpace and YouTube and led MTV to offer the group a sketch comedy series.

On MTV, the show closed out a Thursday night "10 Spot" line-up for MTV, which also included Pimp My Ride, Short Circuitz (before being put on hiatus), and Adventures in Hollyhood, ending with Human Giant. The line-up started at 9 PM and ended at 11 PM.

In interviews, the group has mentioned they were offered a third season by MTV, and were also considering developing a feature film. However, the group was unable to make a third season or movie due to personal projects, particularly with Ansari's commitments to the hit NBC show Parks and Recreation. Without Ansari's participation, the group agreed not to make future content together and decided on ending the series on a positive note instead of burning out over several seasons.

== Episodes ==
Season	Episodes	Originally released	
Season	Episodes	First released	Last released
1	8	April 5, 2007	May 24, 2007
2	6	March 11, 2008	April 15, 2008

=== Season 1 (2007) ===
No.	Title	Original release date
1	"Mind Explosion!"	April 5, 2007
Sketches: Terrifying Pop-Up; Wheelchair Access (also known as "Ghostface Killah Tickets"); Shutterbugs (Episode 1); Aziz's Worst Boombox Challenge^{a}; Camping Weekend; Attack Dogs (Part 1); Illusionators - "Riggle"; Paul's Time Machine; Attack Dogs (Part 2); Mother and Son Moving Company; Illusionators - "Funeral"
2	"Let's Go!"	April 12, 2007
Sketches: Face-Melting Ark; Dick on the Face; Catching a Predator; Self-Defense; Sea Land Psycho; Old-Fashioned Fun^{b}; Sensitivity Training; Product Recall: Washer/Dryer; Let's Go!
3	"Lil 9/11"	April 19, 2007
Sketches: Zoombas; Rob's Vagina; Paul Scheer Is a Total Douchebag Pizzeria Part 1; Shutterbugs: Lil' 9/11 Part 1; Paul Scheer Is a Total Douchebag Pizzeria Part 2; Blood Oath; Astronaut; Commercial Jingles Part 1; Shutterbugs: Lil' 9/11 Part 2; Commercial Jingles Part 2
4	"Mosh Pit"	April 26, 2007
Sketches: Cute Animal Show; Paul's Time Machine 2; Job Interview (known online as "Escalating Interview"); Rob's Mom; Corn Maze; Illusionators: Clone Trick; Mobile World; Product Recall: Cell Phone; Mosh Pit^{b}
5	"Ice Cream Party!"	May 3, 2007
Sketches: Missing Person Part 1; Suit of Arbor; Emergency Party Chat Line^{c}; Clell Tickle: Indie Marketing Guru Part 1^{b}; The Deer; Clell Tickle: Indie Marketing Guru Part 2^{b}; Missing Person Part 2; Illusionators: Street Crossing Part 1; Swindle Tips: Coffee; Illusionators: Street Crossing Part 2
6	"Kneel Before Zerg"	May 10, 2007
Sketches: Hostage Countdown; Mannequin; Shutterbugs: Bobb'e J; Wheelchair Access (also known as "Ghostface Killah Tickets") (repeated); Zoombas (repeated); Corn Maze (repeated); Spacelords: Episode 1; Product Recall: Vacuum; Cliff Tarpey; Product Recall: Aziz; NASA Presents: LUNARTICS
7	"Hello, Susan"	May 17, 2007
Sketches: Mustaches vs. Beards; Genie; Ding Dong Boys Part 1; Swindle Tips: Free Gym Membership; Ding Dong Boys Part 2; Lookalike; Ding Dong Boys Part 3; Exorcism; Exorcism Part 2
8	"Ta Da!!"	May 24, 2007
Sketches: Driver's Ed; Rollerblading; Illusionators: Missile Stunt Part 1; Indian Burial Ground; Illusionators: Missile Stunt Part 2; Morning Zoo; Spacelords: Episode 2

^a This sketch was removed from the season one DVD.
^b These sketches were edited for the season one DVD.
^c Added for the season one DVD.

=== Season 2 (2008) ===
The group began working on Human Giant Season 2 at the end of August, 2007. Note: the CrimeTime sketch, the Gay Porn Star Car Accident sketch, and the Illusinator Camera Trick sketch for season 2 all show up on the Season 1 DVD as easter eggs.

No. overall	No. in season	Title	Original release date
9	1	"Duffel Bag of Death"	March 11, 2008
Sketches: Paul's Grandma; Viral Videos; Shutterbugs: Kiditentiary (Episode 1); CrimeTime; Illusionators: We're Sorry (Episode 1); Car Accident
10	2	"I'm Gonna Live Forever!"	March 18, 2008
Sketches: Sketch Artist; Will Arnett Sex Tape; Carpet Monkey; T-shirt Squad; Lesson Van (Part 1); Sci-Fi Make Up (Episode 1); Lesson Van (Part 2)
11	3	"Respect. Honor. Discipline"	March 25, 2008
Sketches: Proposition; Kicking Cameras (Part 1); Illusionators: We're Sorry (Episode 2, Part 1); Kicking Cameras (Part 2); Hot Air Balloon Patrol; Foley Artist; Illusionators: We're Sorry (Episode 2, Part 2); Bozard and the BBQ Boys (Part 1); Bozard and the BBQ Boys (Part 2)
12	4	"I Want More Corn Chowder"	April 1, 2008
Sketches: Bloody Reminder; Shutterbugs: Kiditentiary (Episode 2); Thunderblast; Corn Chowder (Part 1); Invisible Man; Corn Chowder (Part 2); Mr. Clowny; Corn Chowder (Part 3)
13	5	"Still Here, Man. Still Here."	April 8, 2008
Sketches: Pinatas; Top 10 CD's; Shutterbugs: Kiditentiary (Episode 3); Gas Guzzlers; Tub of Ice; Nightmare Lawyer; Shutterbugs: Kiditentiary (Episode 4)
14	6	"She Be a Witch""	April 15, 2008
Sketches: Montana Meth; Osama Bin Diesel (Part 1); Sci-Fi Make Up (Episode 2); Rise to the Challenge; Court TV - Acting Reel; Osama Bin Diesel (Part 2); Illusionators: Camera Trick

== Critical response ==
The show received positive reviews from critics. Writing for Entertainment Weekly, Gillian Flynn described Human Giant as "everything sketch comedy should be: smart, odd, and surprising." The Village Voice called it "something like a Mountain Dewed-up version of MTV’s mid-'90s sketch offering The State." Nathan Rabin of The A.V. Club said, "It's a testament to the show's addictiveness that the [sketches] leave audiences hungry for more. He added: "Human Giant serves as a vital link between Mr. Show and the current generation of web-weaned funnymen who made their names posting homemade videos online instead of working their way through Second City, The Groundlings, or Saturday Night Live. The show's central dynamic echoes Mr. Show as well. Like Bob Odenkirk, Rob Huebel boasts the bland good looks of a local TV news anchor, yet there's a spark of madness and rage at his core. Castmates Paul Scheer and Aziz Ansari, meanwhile, take turns inhabiting the David Cross role."

In its list of the 40 Greatest Sketch-Comedy TV Shows, Rolling Stone ranked Human Giant at number 38.

== 24-hour marathon ==
The cast of Human Giant were on-air on MTV and MTV2 for a twenty-four-hour period between noon on Friday, May 18, 2007 to noon on Saturday, May 19, 2007, broadcasting from MTV's Times Square studio, during which time they were given free rein to perform skits, bring in guests, and air clips from classic MTV series like Remote Control and The State. The ostensible premise of the "marathon" was that their show would be given a second season if they could get a million hits on their website (which it did) during that time. Notable guests stopping by included Albert Hammond Jr., Fred Armisen, Bill Hader, Andy Samberg, and Jorma Taccone from Saturday Night Live, Will Arnett and Michael Cera from Arrested Development, John Krasinski, Bob Odenkirk, Michael Showalter, Kristen Schaal, Eugene Mirman, Ted Leo, Corn Mo, Todd Barry, Matt Higgins, Zach Galifianakis, Morningwood, Mastodon, Tapes 'n Tapes, The National, Tim and Eric, Tegan and Sara, and others.

== Reunion ==
In late May 2010, troupe member Aziz Ansari announced on his website that he and fellow members Rob Huebel, Paul Scheer and Jason Woliner had filmed a brand new sketch for the 2010 MTV Movie Awards, which Ansari was scheduled to host. Ansari mentioned that it would be a Human Giant reunion of sorts, the first time they filmed a new sketch together as a sketch group since the series ended.

The sketch was called "Stunt Kidz", which consisted of Huebel and Ansari's Shutterbugs characters, now owners of a child stunt agency where little children act as stunt men for dangerous scenes and end up injured in several occasions. Scheer acts as a director who employs Huebel and Ansari.

== Home media ==
The first season of Human Giant was released on March 4, 2008, one week ahead of the season two premiere on March 11. It was released in a two-disc set. Disc one features all eight episodes and commentary tracks on all episodes with special guests calling-in or with the cast in the commentary room. Disc two features highlights from the 24-hour marathon, deleted and alternate scenes, unaired sketches, sneak previews for season two, early footage with Aziz, Rob and Paul, and a compilation clip.

== Credited consultants ==
The core writing team consists of Aziz Ansari, Rob Huebel, Paul Scheer, Jason Woliner and executive producer Tom Gianas. The following people have, at one point, also worked as consultants on the show:

- Eric Appel
- Andy Blitz
- Brian Posehn
- Patton Oswalt
- Jon Glaser
- Dan Mintz
- Howard Kremer
- Jay Johnston
- Ian Roberts
- Matt Walsh
- Leo Allen
- Jerry Minor
- Ali Farahnakian
- Morgan Murphy
- H. Jon Benjamin
- Nick Swardson
- Tommy Blacha
- Chris Romano
- Harris Wittels
- Paul Rust
- Neil Campbell
- Bobby Moynihan
- Charlie Sanders
- Kristen Schaal
- Brett Gelman
- John Gemberling
- Curtis Gwinn
- Liz Cackowski

== See also ==
- List of programs broadcast by MTV
