= Yassir Lester =

Comedian, actor, and writer

- Born: June 22, 1984 (age 42); Miami, Florida, U.S.
- Occupations: Comedian, actor, writer
- Years active: 2011–present
- Known for: Making History, Black Monday, Armor Wars
- Spouse: Chelsea Devantez (m. 2022)

Yassir Lester (born June 22, 1984) is an American stand-up comedian, writer, and actor. He was on the writing staff for The Carmichael Show and Girls. He is best known for his role as Chris in Making History, and a role as a stockbroker, also named Yassir, in the 2019 Showtime series Black Monday.

== Early life ==
Lester was born in Miami, Florida. As a child, his family relocated to Marietta, Georgia. His mother is African-American and his father is Palestinian. He aspired to be a stand-up comedian from a young age, and moved to Los Angeles at 21 to pursue a comedy career.

== Career ==
In 2016, Lester simultaneously worked on the writing staff of both The Carmichael Show and Girls. He took a break to film Making History, which ran on Fox for one season. He stated that he never intended to act, and had moved to Hollywood to work in TV production and as a stand-up comedian. His friend Adam Pally, who was already attached to star, encouraged him to audition.

He was a cast member on the series Champions in 2018, which was cancelled after one season. From 2019 to 2021 he appeared as a Muslim Wall Street trader, also named Yassir, in the Showtime series Black Monday.

In August 2021, Lester joined as screenwriter and executive producer on the upcoming superhero film Armor Wars, set in the Marvel Cinematic Universe.

Lester regularly performs stand-up comedy.

In 2024, Lester directed, produced and wrote the sports comedy film The Gutter.

== Filmography ==
=== Television ===
Year	Title	Role	Note
2013	TakePart Live	Himself	6 episodes
2014	My Super-Overactive Imagination	The Epic Ex	Episode: "Showcase Showdown Part 2"
2014	Between the Sheets with Josh Macuga	Himself	Episode: "Guest: Yassir Lester"
2014	After the Party	Stranger	Episode: "Garage Sale"
2014	Key & Peele	Laron's Friend #2	Episode: "Concussion Quarterback"
2014	Snack Off	Himself / Judge	10 episodes
2014	Chelsea Peretti: One of the Greats	Himself	Netflix special
2016	Netflix Presents: The Characters	Male Student	Episode: "Kate Berlant"
2016	The Carmichael Show	—N/a	Story editor and writer
2016–2017	Girls	Declan	2 episodes; also story editor and staff writer
2016–2017	@midnight	Himself	5 episodes
2017	Making History	Chris Parrish	Main role
2017	The Mindy Project	David	Episode: "Jeremy & Anna's Meryl Streep Costume Party"
2018	Champions	Shabaz	8 episodes
2018	Comedy Knockout	Himself	2 episodes
2018	A Legendary Christmas with John and Chrissy	Himself	Christmas special
2019–2021	Black Monday	Yassir X	Main role; also writer, story editor, and co-executive producer
2019	Brooklyn Nine-Nine	Quentin Chase	Episode: "The Tattler"
2020	#blackAF	Director	Episode: "yo, between you and me... this is because of slavery"; also producer
2020	United We Fall	Yassir	Episode: "The Weekend"
2020	The George Lucas Talk Show	Himself	Episode: "May the AR Be LI$$ You"
2020–2022	Duncanville	Yangzi (voice)	Series regular
2021	Black-ish	Jamal	Episode: "Things Done Changed"
2021	Ten Year Old Tom	(voice)	Episode: "The Bassoon Incident/Ice Cream Money"; also writer and co-executive producer
2022	Single Drunk Female	Lucas	Episode: "James"
2024	Sausage Party: Foodtopia	Iced Tea (voice)	4 episodes
2025	Ghosts	Garrett	Episode: "Viking Wedding"

=== Film ===
Year	Title	Role	Note
2016	The Bet	Ed McDoogle	
2022	Clerks III	RST Customer	
2024	The Gutter	—N/a	Writer, director, and executive producer

=== Web ===
Year	Title	Role	Note
2011	The Late Night Fix with Yassir Lester	Himself	Main role, also writer and executive producer
2021	Storytime with Seth Rogen	Himself	Podcast; Episode: "Ugly Joke"
