= Sausage Party =

2016 adult animated film by Conrad Vernon and Greg Tiernan

- Theatrical release poster
- Directed by: Conrad Vernon; Greg Tiernan
- Screenplay by: Kyle Hunter; Ariel Shaffir; Seth Rogen; Evan Goldberg
- Story by: Seth Rogen; Evan Goldberg; Jonah Hill
- Produced by: Megan Ellison; Seth Rogen; Evan Goldberg; Conrad Vernon
- Starring: Seth Rogen; Kristen Wiig; Jonah Hill; Bill Hader; Michael Cera; James Franco; Danny McBride; Craig Robinson; Paul Rudd; Nick Kroll; David Krumholtz; Edward Norton; Salma Hayek
- Edited by: Kevin Pavlovic
- Music by: Alan Menken; Christopher Lennertz
- Production companies: Columbia Pictures; Annapurna Pictures; Point Grey Pictures
- Distributed by: Sony Pictures Releasing
- Release dates: March 14, 2016 (SXSW); August 12, 2016 (United States)
- Running time: 89 minutes
- Countries: United States; Canada
- Language: English
- Budget: $19 million
- Box office: $141.3 million

Sausage Party is a 2016 adult animated black comedy film directed by Conrad Vernon and Greg Tiernan (in his feature-length directorial debut), and written by Kyle Hunter, Ariel Shaffir, Seth Rogen and Evan Goldberg. A co-production between Canada and the United States, the film features the voices of Rogen, Kristen Wiig, Jonah Hill, Bill Hader, Michael Cera, James Franco, Danny McBride, Craig Robinson, Paul Rudd, Nick Kroll, David Krumholtz, Edward Norton and Salma Hayek. The film follows an anthropomorphic sausage (Rogen) who lives in a supermarket and goes on a journey with his friends to escape their fate as groceries eaten by humans.

The film's animation was handled by the Vancouver-based Nitrogen Studios. It is the first 3D computer-animated film in both United States and Canada to be rated R by the Motion Picture Association of America. The film's rough cut premiered on March 14, 2016, at South by Southwest, followed by its general theatrical release in the United States on August 12, 2016, by Sony Pictures Releasing through its Columbia Pictures label. Sausage Party received generally positive reviews from critics and grossed $141 million against a budget of $19 million, surpassing South Park: Bigger, Longer, & Uncut (1999) as the highest-grossing R-rated animated film at the time of its release.

A sequel television series, Sausage Party: Foodtopia, was released in 2024.

== Plot ==
Unbeknownst to humans, a supermarket called Shopwell's is populated by anthropomorphic foodstuffs, as well as some other consumable items, that believe human shoppers are gods who take purchased groceries to a utopia known as the "Great Beyond". Among the groceries is a sausage named Frank, who dreams of living in the Great Beyond with his hot dog bun girlfriend Brenda.

One day, Frank and Brenda's packages are purchased by a shopper named Camille Toh. On their way out of the store, a returned jar of honey mustard tries to warn the groceries that the Great Beyond is a lie, but nobody listens except Frank. Before committing suicide, Honey Mustard tells Frank to seek out a bottle of liquor named Firewater. Honey Mustard's suicide creates an accidental cart collision that causes Frank, Brenda and several groceries to fall out of the cart, including Jewish bagel Sammy Bagel Jr., the Arab lavash Kareem Abdul Lavash and an aggressive douche who swears revenge on Frank and Brenda after his nozzle is bent on impact.

Seeking to verify Honey Mustard's warning, Frank leads Brenda, Sammy and Lavash to the liquor aisle where he meets Firewater and his colleagues, the Non-Perishables (a box of hominy grits named Mr. Grits and a Twinkie named Twink), who tell Frank that they created the noble lie of the Great Beyond to assuage the groceries' fear of being eaten. To their dismay, this has had the unintended effect of the various aisles developing divisive belief systems based on their own prejudices and interpretations of the original "revelation". Despite Firewater's warning that he will not be believed, Frank vows to reveal the truth and is encouraged to travel beyond the store's freezer section to find proof. Brenda, Sammy and Lavash are brought to the Mexican food aisle by a bottle of tequila, who is secretly working for Douche. Teresa del Taco, a lesbian taco, develops a crush on Brenda and helps them escape Douche.

Meanwhile, at Camille's house, Frank's two best friends, Carl and Barry, are horrified to see the shopper cooking the foods. Carl is stabbed to death as he tries to flee through an open window with Barry. Afterwards, Barry encounters a human drug addict, who becomes able to communicate with his groceries (one of them being Gum, a Stephen Hawking-like wad of chewing gum) after injecting himself with bath salts. The bath salts wear off and the addict prepares to cook Barry, but he accidentally burns himself and Barry yanks his shoelaces, making him slip and causing a hanging battle axe to fall and decapitate him.

Frank reunites with his friends, but they separate again when they along with Brenda disapprove of his skepticism of the Great Beyond. He reaches the Dark Aisle, and discovers a cookbook beyond the freezer section. He reveals its contents to the store's inhabitants who panic at first, but Frank's condescending tone and failure to offer a positive alternative prompt them to cling even more strongly to their beliefs, and his claims and evidence are dismissed. Suddenly, Barry, Gum and the other groceries from the addict's home return with the man's severed head, proving that the humans can be killed. Barry apologizes to Frank for not helping him when he fell out of the cart. The group drugs the human shoppers and employees with toothpicks laced with bath salts, whereupon a battle begins. Several humans are gruesomely killed by the now unified groceries while Douche takes control of the store manager, Darren, and uses the human's body to take a bite out of Frank's torso. Brenda saves Frank as Barry and the other groceries catch Douche and Darren in a garbage pail strapped to propane tanks. They are then launched out of the store as the tanks explode, killing them both. Afterwards, the inhabitants celebrate their victory with a massive orgy.

In an epilogue, Frank and his friends visit Firewater, who has had a psychedelic experience with Gum and discovered that their world is not what they think: they are merely animated characters voiced by actors in another dimension. Gum has constructed a portal to this dimension and the group travel there to confront their creators.

== Voice cast ==
- Seth Rogen as Frank Frankfurter, a sausage who sets out to discover and expose the truth about the "Great Beyond"
- Kristen Wiig as Brenda Bunson, a hot dog bun who is Frank's love interest
- Jonah Hill as Carl, a sausage who is friends with Frank and Barry
- Bill Hader as:
  - Firewater, an old bottle of Native American liquor and the leader of the Non-Perishables
  - Tequila, a bottle of Mexican tequila who works for Douche and later gets killed by him after failing to bring Frank and Brenda to him
- Michael Cera as Barry, a short and deformed sausage who is friends with Frank and Carl
- James Franco as Druggie, who is the first-known human to discover the food's anthropomorphism after injecting himself with bath salts
- Danny McBride as Honey Mustard, who is returned to his shelf upon the shopper who purchased him mistaking him for regular mustard and tries to warn Frank and the other products of the reality of the "Great Beyond"
- Craig Robinson as Mr. Grits, an African-American box of grits and a member of the Non-Perishables. He has a grudge against crackers, a pun on the pejorative term
- Paul Rudd as Darren, the long-time store manager of Shopwell's who is famously nicknamed the "dark lord" as he disposes of expired food and spilled items
- Nick Kroll as Douche, a psychopathic douche and Frank's arch-nemesis, who seeks revenge on Frank for accidentally breaking his nozzle and ruining his arrival to the "Great Beyond"
- David Krumholtz as Kareem Abdul-Lavash, an Arab lavash who has an on-and-off rivalry with Sammy. His name is a play on Kareem Abdul-Jabbar
- Edward Norton as Sammy Bagel Jr., a neurotic Jewish bagel who has an on-and-off rivalry with Lavash. His name is a play on Sammy Davis Jr.
- Salma Hayek as Teresa del Taco, a lesbian Mexican taco who is attracted to Brenda
- Scott "Diggs" Underwood as:
  - Gum, a super-intelligent but paraplegic wad of chewing gum on a battery-powered homemade wheelchair. He is a parody of Stephen Hawking.
  - Twink, a gay Twinkie who is a member of the Non-Perishables
- Anders Holm as Troy, a bully sausage who likes to pick on Barry
- Lauren Miller Rogen as Camille Toh, a "MILF" shopper who purchases Frank and Brenda's packages. Her name is a pun on "camel toe".

Additional character voices were provided by Alistair Abell, Iris Apatow, Sugar Lyn Beard, Ian James Corlett, Michael Daingerfield, Brian and Michael Dobson, Ian Hanlin, Maryke Hendrikse, Nicole Oliver, Kelly Sheridan, Jason Simpson, Vincent Tong, Underwood, Sam Vincent and Harland Williams, as well as directors Conrad Vernon and Greg Tiernan.

An archival recording of Meat Loaf's "I'd Do Anything for Love (But I Won't Do That)" was used for the singing voice of a meatloaf grocery-based caricature of him.

== Production ==
Seth Rogen has said that he worked for eight years to get the film made but the content worried most film studios. Noting that the film came from "an innocent place", Rogen stated that "'What would it be like if our food had feelings?' We very quickly realized that it would be fucked up." Evan Goldberg revealed the project to Indiewire in July 2010, stating it was a "top secret super project". Initially, Indiewire was skeptical that the project was real and not a hoax on Goldberg's part, but after vetting, it did confirm that it was in the works. In November 2010, Jonah Hill independently confirmed to MTV News that he was working on an R-rated 3D animated film. Goldberg and executive producer James Weaver said that they had specific targets—Disney and Pixar films, which they have "ripped apart". Goldberg said, "We're just kind of taking all the conventions of children's movies, and making them disgusting and insane".

The film was formally announced in September 2013 as a partnership between Sony Pictures, Annapurna Pictures, and Rogen, Goldberg and Weaver's Point Grey Pictures. On May 29, 2014, it was announced that the film would be released on June 3, 2016, but the release date was later revised to August 12, 2016. In January 2014, Rogen, Hill, James Franco, and Kristen Wiig were announced as the leads in the film. The other cast includes Edward Norton, Michael Cera, David Krumholtz and Nick Kroll. On April 9, 2014, Salma Hayek was set to lend her voice to the film as Teresa the Taco. It was also announced that Paul Rudd, Danny McBride and Anders Holm would voice characters in the film.

When Rogen originally submitted the film to the Motion Picture Association of America, they gave it an NC-17 rating due to the visibility of pubic hair on Lavash's scrotum during the climactic food orgy scene. Once said pubic hair was removed, the film received its final R rating for "strong crude sexual content, pervasive language and drug use". The film was granted a −12 certificate by France's film classification commission, which was criticized by Catholic groups in the country. The British Board of Film Classification classified the film at 15, although the Blu-ray release was classified 18 because of supplemental material. In Australia, the film was rated MA15+. In Japan, the Eirin rated the film as R15+.

== Music ==
Sausage Party

Film score by Alan Menken and Christopher Lennertz
- Released: August 5, 2016
- Recorded: 2016
- Genre: Film score
- Length: 74:49
- Labels: Madison Gate Records; Sony Music Masterworks
- Producers: Alan Menken; Christopher Lennertz

Alan Menken film scores chronology
Mirror Mirror (2012)	Sausage Party (2016)	Beauty and the Beast (2017)

Christopher Lennertz chronology
The Boss (2016)	Sausage Party (2016)	Smurfs: The Lost Village (2017)

The film's score was composed by Alan Menken and Christopher Lennertz. Lennertz declared that the duo decided to have a serious and straightforward musical approach, performed with a full orchestra at Abbey Road Studios, for feeling that “to try to make [the movie] more funny is the wrong thing to do". Rogen and Goldberg agreed, highlighting that the music was important to "make the ridiculous actually ground itself” and highlight the emotional parts of the film. The film opens on a musical number, "The Great Beyond", which Menken described as a "bouncy, charming and 'prototypical Menken'" nod to his work in various Disney films, with him noting a similar composing process: "We went to the Beauty and the Beast place. We were being very clever, and rhyme oriented. I had three counter-melodies, and of course, a lot of profanity." Menken spent over a year writing alongside lyricist Glenn Slater, with frequent input from the film's writers, who were the ones who added a pun referencing to the Holocaust ("eliminating the juice"), and another referencing the sexual act of "tea-bagging”.

The film's soundtrack album was released on August 5, 2016, by Madison Gate Records and Sony Music Masterworks.

Track listing

All music is composed by Alan Menken and Christopher Lennertz, except as noted.

No.	Title	Writer(s)	Artist(s)	Length
1.	"The Great Beyond"	Alan Menken (music); Glenn Slater; Seth Rogen; Evan Goldberg; Ariel Shaffir; Kyle Hunter (lyrics)	Sausage Party cast	3:13
2.	"Darren, the Dark Lord"			0:55
3.	"Chosen"			1:50
4.	"I'd Do Anything for Love (But I Won't Do That)"	Jim Steinman	Meat Loaf	5:14
5.	"The Crash"			2:34
6.	"Douche Loses It"			2:16
7.	"Wake Me Up Before You Go-Go"	George Michael	Wham!	3:50
8.	"Our Heroes"			2:31
9.	"He's Coming"			1:47
10.	"Food Massacre"			3:15
11.	"Hungry Eyes"	Franke Previte; John DeNicola	Eric Carmen	3:47
12.	"True"	Gary Kemp	Spandau Ballet	5:31
13.	"The Spooge"			3:46
14.	"Magical Sausage"			1:40
15.	"Gone"	Joshua Epstein; Mike Higgins; Dan Nigro; Daniel Zott	JR JR	3:46
16.	"We're Home"			3:29
17.	"The Cookbook"			1:26
18.	"I Have Proof"			3:06
19.	"Big Speech"			3:04
20.	"The Big Fight"			2:37
21.	"Final Battle"			4:04
22.	"It's Your Thing"	Ronald Isley; O'Kelly Isley Jr.; Rudolph Isley	The Isley Brothers	2:46
23.	"Finale"			2:24
24.	"Joy to the World"	Hoyt Axton	Three Dog Night	3:14
25.	"The Great Beyond Around the World"	Alan Menken (music); Glenn Slater; Seth Rogen; Evan Goldberg; Ariel Shaffir; Kyle Hunter (lyrics)	Sausage Party cast	2:44
Total length:				74:49

== Release ==
Sausage Party was originally set for release on June 3, 2016, but was pushed back to August 12, 2016. A rough cut of the film was shown at the South by Southwest Film Festival on March 14, 2016. The final cut of the film screened at Just for Laughs on July 30, 2016. It premiered one final time in Westwood before the film was theatrically released in the United States on August 12, 2016. The film was released in the United Kingdom on September 2, 2016.

=== Box office ===
Sausage Party grossed $97.7 million in North America and $42.8 million in other territories for a worldwide total of $141.3 million, against a budget of $19 million. The film was the highest-grossing R-rated animated film of all time, replacing South Park: Bigger, Longer & Uncut (which held the record for 17 years), until it was surpassed in 2020 by Demon Slayer: Mugen Train. It made a net profit of $47.06 million, when factoring together all expenses and revenues.

In the United States and Canada, Sausage Party was released on August 12, 2016, alongside Pete's Dragon and Florence Foster Jenkins, and was initially projected to gross $15–20 million from 2,805 theaters in its opening weekend. However, after grossing $3.3 million from Thursday night previews (more than the $1.7 million made by Rogen's Neighbors 2: Sorority Rising in May) and $13.5 million on its first day, weekend projections were increased to $30–35 million. The film ultimately grossed $33.6 million in its opening weekend, finishing second at the box office, behind Suicide Squad.

Outside North America, the biggest markets are the United Kingdom, Australia, Spain, Germany, Russia, and Israel, where the film grossed $10.2 million, $6.8 million, $4.1 million, $3.5 million $2.6 million and $2 million, respectively.

=== Home media ===
Sausage Party was released by Sony Pictures Home Entertainment on Ultra HD Blu-ray, Blu-ray, DVD and digital download on November 8, 2016.

== Reception ==
=== Critical response ===
On the review aggregator Rotten Tomatoes, the film has an approval rating of 82%, based on 237 reviews, with an average rating of 6.80/10. The site's critical consensus reads, "Sausage Party is definitely offensive, but backs up its enthusiastic profanity with an impressively high laugh-to-gag ratio—and a surprisingly thought-provoking storyline." On Metacritic, the film has a score of 66 out of 100, based on 39 critics, indicating "generally favorable reviews". Audiences polled by CinemaScore gave the film an average grade of "B" on an A+ to F scale.

Vince Mancini of Uproxx wrote that "Sausage Party's most charming quality is that it feels exactly like a group of 13-year-olds trying to entertain themselves, with excessive C-bombs and constant groan-worthy food puns." Reviewers also compared the film unfavourably to Toy Story (1995), A Bug's Life (1998), South Park: Bigger, Longer & Uncut (1999), Cloudy with a Chance of Meatballs (2009), The Lego Movie (2014), and Inside Out (2015). Richard Roeper gave the film three out of four stars, saying, "Despite all the cursing and envelope-pushing and bat-bleep crazy sexual stuff, Sausage Party isn't mean-spirited. It's just... stupid. But also pretty smart. And funny as hell." Lindsey Bahr of Associated Press gave the film a positive review, writing, "There is no one out there making comedies quite like Rogen and Goldberg. They are putting their definitive stamp on the modern American comedy one decency-smashing double entendre at a time."

=== Awards and accolades ===
Award	Date of ceremony	Category	Recipient(s)	Result	Ref.
Annie Awards	February 4, 2017	Outstanding Achievement, Editorial in an Animated Feature Production	Kevin Pavlovic	Nominated	
Central Ohio Film Critics Association	January 6, 2017	Best Animated Feature Film	Sausage Party	Nominated	
Hollywood Music in Media Awards	November 17, 2016	Best Original Song – Animated Film	"The Great Beyond" – Alan Menken, Glenn Slater, Seth Rogen, Evan Goldberg, Ariel Shaffir and Kyle Hunter	Nominated	
Houston Film Critics Society	January 6, 2017	Best Animated Feature Film	Sausage Party	Nominated	
Indiana Film Journalists Association	December 19, 2016	Best Animated Feature Film	Sausage Party	Runner-up	
Indiana Film Journalists Association	December 19, 2016	Best Vocal/Motion Capture Performance	Nick Kroll	2nd Place	
MTV Movie & TV Awards	May 7, 2017	Best Comedic Performance	Seth Rogen	Nominated	
Village Voice Film Poll	January 6, 2017	Best Animated Feature	Sausage Party	5th place	
Washington D.C. Area Film Critics Association	December 5, 2016	Best Animated Feature	Conrad Vernon and Greg Tiernan	Nominated	

== Controversy ==
After the film's release, controversy emerged after anonymous comments attributed to the animators on a Cartoon Brew article suggested that the animators at Nitrogen Studios worked under poor conditions and were forced by co-director Greg Tiernan to work overtime for free. A total of 36 of the 83 animators were blacklisted and went uncredited in the film, believed to be due to their complaints; comments made in anonymous interviews by some of the animators involved in the project by Variety, The Washington Post and The Hollywood Reporter alleged that the comments were accurate. All the animators in the film were reportedly told outright that they would be blacklisted if they refused to work overtime without pay. In late March 2019, the British Columbia Employment Standards Branch ruled that workers were entitled to receive overtime pay for their work on the film.

== Future ==
=== Possible sequel ===
Rogen has expressed interest in making a sequel to Sausage Party and more animated films aimed for adults. When asked about the possibility of a sequel, Rogen stated: "It's something we talk about, yeah. That's one of the reasons why we took away the [original] ending because we thought, well, if that was the first scene of the next movie it's probably not what you would want it to be, with them just seeing us and finding us basically. But the idea of a live-action/animated movie, like a Who Framed Roger Rabbit-style hybrid, is also very exciting, mostly because Who Framed Roger Rabbit is one of my favorite movies of all time."

=== Follow-up series ===
On October 26, 2022, Sausage Party: Foodtopia, a sequel was greenlit from Amazon Studios to produce 8 episodes with a 2024 release date, with most of the cast involved and co-produced by Sony Pictures Television, Annapurna Television and Point Grey Pictures. In May 2024, it was announced the series would premiere on July 11, 2024, with Rogen, Wiig, Cera, Norton and Krumholtz reprising their roles.

=== Mobile game ===
Frank and Brenda, the two main characters of the film, made guest appearances in the mobile fighting game Sausage Legend, released by Milkcorp for iOS and Android, as part of a limited special event that ran from March 6 through July 31, 2017. As this game involves dueling with sausages, players in this game can unlock and control Brenda, who swings Frank around to battle other sausages.

== See also ==
- Happy Tree Friends
- The Amazing Digital Circus
- Fixed
- Animal Friends
