= Sausage Party: Foodtopia =

Adult animated television series

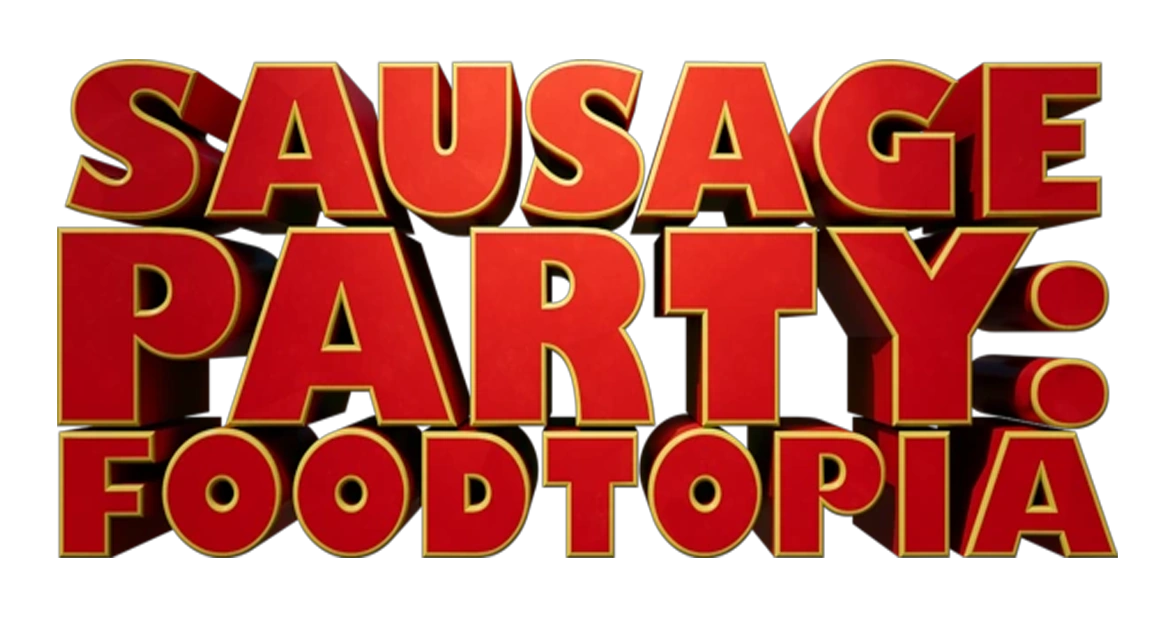
- Genre: Adult animation; Surreal humor; Black comedy; Satire
- Created by: Seth Rogen; Evan Goldberg; Kyle Hunter; Ariel Shaffir
- Based on: Sausage Party by: Ariel Shaffir; Kyle Hunter; Seth Rogen; Evan Goldberg; Jonah Hill
- Developed by: Kyle Hunter; Ariel Shaffir
- Directed by: Conrad Vernon
- Voices of: Seth Rogen; Kristen Wiig; Edward Norton; Michael Cera; Will Forte
- Music by: Christopher Lennertz; Alexander Bornstein (season 2)
- Countries of origin: United States; Canada
- Original language: English
- No. of seasons: 2
- No. of episodes: 16

Production
- Executive producers: Megan Ellison; Patrick Chu; Seth Rogen; Evan Goldberg; Kyle Hunter; Ariel Shaffir; Conrad Vernon; Andrew Millstein; James Weaver; Alex McAtee; Jonah Hill
- Producer: Haiet Lakouache
- Running time: 23–28 minutes
- Production companies: Amazon MGM Studios; Sony Pictures Television; Point Grey Pictures; Annapurna Television

Original release
- Network: Amazon Prime Video
- Release: July 11, 2024 – August 13, 2025

Related
- Sausage Party

Sausage Party: Foodtopia is an adult animated dark comedy television series that serves as a sequel to the film Sausage Party (2016) created by Seth Rogen, Evan Goldberg, Kyle Hunter, and Ariel Shaffir, and developed by the latter two for Amazon Prime Video. (Note: Conrad Vernon directed Sausage Party with Greg Tiernan, Seth Rogen and Evan Goldberg served as producers and co-wrote both the screenplay and story, and Kyle Hunter and Ariel Shaffir co-wrote the screenplay.) It features the returning voices of Rogen, Kristen Wiig, Michael Cera, Edward Norton, David Krumholtz and Scott "Diggs" Underwood, with Will Forte, Sam Richardson, Stephanie Beard, Natasha Rothwell, and Yassir Lester voicing new characters. Season 2 adds Jillian Bell, Martin Starr, Marion Cotillard, Patti Harrison, and Andre Braugher.

The first season premiered on Amazon Prime Video on July 11, 2024. The series received generally mixed reviews from critics, who praised its voice acting, animation, score, and humor, while others were divided about its controversial political themes, and criticized its writing and characters. The second season premiered on August 13, 2025.

== Premise ==
After standing up to the human race following the events of Sausage Party, Frank and his friends establish a safe haven dubbed "Foodtopia". Following a massive flood that destroys their once promised land, they have no choice but to partner with humans to ensure the survival of their race.

== Cast ==
=== Main ===
- Seth Rogen as Frank Frankfurter, a sausage
- Kristen Wiig as Brenda Bunson (season 1), a hot dog bun and Frank's love interest
- Michael Cera as Barry, a small deformed sausage and Frank's best friend
- Edward Norton as Sammy Bagel Jr., a neurotic Jewish bagel who had a relationship with Lavash. After Lavash's death, he becomes a comedian talk show host for Foodtopia.
- Will Forte as Jack, a surviving human whom Frank and Brenda kept alive in order to learn about humanity, along with things such as weather, ravenous animals, and politics. Due to becoming an ally of food, he resorts to cannibalism to avoid eating them.

=== Recurring and guest ===
- Sam Richardson as Julius, a tyrannical orange who uses his charms and wealth of human teeth to gain followers in order to take over Foodtopia. The character is a parody of Donald Trump, with his name being a play on Orange Julius and Julius Caesar.
- Yassir Lester as Iced Tea, a glass bottle of iced tea who is one of the recruits of a task force established by Barry in order to stop foods from stealing teeth from other foods. He also became Barry's partner during the task force establishment.
- Natasha Rothwell as Rutabaga Ginsberg, a rutabaga who serves as the judge of Foodtopia. Her name is a pun on former U.S. Supreme Court Justice Ruth Bader Ginsburg. Rothwell also voices multiple other characters, such as Margarine Taylor Greene (a margarine whose name is a pun on Marjorie Taylor Greene), Eggetha, Box of Crackers, Jar of Jams, and Pie.
- David Krumholtz as Kareem Abdul-Lavash, a Middle Eastern lavash who had a relationship with Sammy and is named after basketballer Kareem Abdul-Jabbar. He is killed off during the uprising, leaving Sammy devastated. Krumholtz also voices multiple other characters, such as Can of Peaches, Bread, Macaroni, Dog Food, and Tomato Soup.
- Scott "Diggs" Underwood as:
  - Gum, a Stephen Hawking-esque intelligent but paraplegic wad of chewed gum who wears glasses and has a mechanized wheelchair. He dies after sacrificing himself for the other food during the flood.
  - Twink, a twinkie who serves as a member of the "non-perishable immortals" who informed Frank about the truth of his world in the 2016 feature film. He is the only member of the trio of non-perishables who was confirmed to have returned from the film.
  - Duncan Doughnut, a double vanilla frosting-glazed doughnut whose name is a pun on the brand Dunkin' Donuts. He briefly replaces Sammy as show host for Foodtopia and as the owner of the Aesop's Cables (a pun on Aesop's Fables) electronics store under Julius' control, and later participates in a rebellion against Frank and Jack.
- Jimmy O. Yang as multiple characters, including Energy Drink, Licorice Rope, and Bread.
- Timothy Simons as multiple characters, including Strawberry Jam, Fruit, Potato, and Cop 3.
- Grey DeLisle as multiple characters, including Red Lentils (a box of red lentils who had a human tooth stolen by Pops), Katy Perrier (a bottle of Perrier—the brand of carbonated mineral water—and a play on the real-life singer Katy Perry), Carrot, Whole Milk, and Wild Berries.
- André Sogliuzzo as multiple characters, including Christopher "Chris" Bologna (a bologna who serves as one of the recruits of Barry's task force and later one of Julius' two enforcers, and whose name is a pun on actor Christopher Meloni, known for Law and Order: SVU), Melon Gibson (a melon whose name is a pun on actor Mel Gibson), and A1 Sauce.
- Jill Talley as multiple characters, including Kishka Hargitay (a kishka who serves as one of the recruits of Barry's task force and later one of Julius' two enforcers, and whose name is a pun on actress, producer and philanthropist Mariska Hargitay, also known for Law and Order: SVU), Wild Berries, and Random Foods.

==== Season 1 ====
- Stephanie Beard as Jeri Rice, a tiny grain of rice who is the sole survivor of her family drowning from the flood and has a personal hatred towards Julius, who selfishly left her for dead. Her name is a pun on former NFL wide receiver Jerry Rice.
- James Adomian as Pops, an orange-flavored Popsicle who stole a tooth from Red Lentils.
- Lena Hall as Random Food
- Evan Goldberg as multiple characters, including Jelly Donut, Beet, Soda, Bread, Cucumber, Mango, and Turkey.
- SungWon Cho as multiple characters, including Apple, Banana, and Plum.

==== Season 2 ====
- Jillian Bell as Nutricia / Trish, a walnut who serves as the head honcho of the council that leads New Foodland.
- Martin Starr as Sherman, a woman's torso-shaped birthday cake who is Trish's right-hand man and data analyst of the council that leads New Foodland.
- Marion Cotillard as Dijon, a martial artist jar of Dijon who serves as captain of the New Foodland fuel mission squad and later becomes Barry's new love interest.
- Patti Harrison as Jill, a female human who Dijon controls and later becomes Jack's love interest.
- Ruth Negga as Sinead O'Potato, a potato who participates in a rebellion against Frank and Jack.
- Maria Bamford as Popcorn
- Fred Melamed as Baked Beans Can
- Haley Joel Osment as Additional Voices
- Andre Braugher as General Owens, a surviving human general who leads one of the last remaining military resistances after the food revolution. This would end up being the final released acting performance for Braugher, who died in 2023.

== Episodes ==
Season	Episodes	Originally released
1	8	July 11, 2024
2	8	August 13, 2025

=== Season 1 (2024) ===
No. overall	No. in season	Title	Written by	Original release date
1	1	"First Course"	Seth Rogen, Evan Goldberg, Kyle Hunter & Ariel Shaffir	July 11, 2024
One month after the events of Sausage Party, the food items at Shopwell's, led by Frank, Brenda, Barry, Lavash, Sammy, and Gum, stage an uprising and successfully overthrow the human race, resulting in food to become the new dominant species on Earth, now free to do whatever they want. However, Sammy struggles to move past Lavash's death, as he was killed during the uprising, and Barry struggles to wind down, having a desire for action. A rainstorm arrives, resulting in a flash flood that leads to numerous deaths; Gum sacrifices himself to save his friends from falling into a sewer drain, and Barry goes off to rescue the food that has been washed away. With their promised land completely ruined, the food, realizing that Frank and Brenda have no idea what they are doing, decide to go back to Shopwell's, claiming it is safer despite the store falling apart, making Frank and Brenda comment that they wish they had a human to help them out. Meanwhile, Barry discovers a human, Richie, escaping with the food he is saving.
2	2	"Second Course"	Ali Waller	July 11, 2024
Frank, Brenda, and Barry search for Richie to learn about rain, but Barry kills Richie before they get answers. They are ambushed by Richie's friends, Jack and Donny. Barry, inspired by Douche, takes control of Jack by injecting himself into Jack's butt, forcing Jack to kill Donny. At Shopwell's, Sammy discovers a talent for stand-up comedy, amusing the other foods. Their laughter causes the store to collapse, but they escape using an exit opened by Jack. With Shopwell's destroyed, Frank and Brenda encourage everyone to find a new home. As they settle into their new life, the foods, influenced by an orange named Julius, begin hoarding buildings, creating chaos and leaving smaller foods homeless. Barry prepares to kill Jack, while Sammy suggests celebrating with a festival.
3	3	"Third Course"	Dewayne Perkins	July 11, 2024
The foods are getting themselves ready for the "Burning Man" Festival, where they will sacrifice Jack in front of a large audience by burning him alive. While holding auditions for the ceremony's performances, a crow arrives and starts attacking. After Barry's initial attempt to stop it fails, Frank and Brenda consult Jack once more on how to stop it, to which he suggests using the corpse of a dead human as a makeshift scarecrow, which successfully scares it away. Because of this, Frank and Brenda consider delaying Jack's sacrifice in case they need more of his help, but Barry refuses, telling them that Jack must die and will not take any excuses. That night, as the festival occurs, Julius offers to let smaller foods view the show from his building in exchange for their human teeth, their newfound form of currency. Going against Barry's wishes, Frank and Brenda secretly decide to spare Jack, and Frank manages to find another live human to control in order to take Jack's place, successfully fooling everyone into believing Jack is dead. Frank and Brenda take Jack to their treehouse to hide, only to start second-guessing their decision when Jack begins to rattle off what he'd like to eat.
4	4	"Fourth Course"	Jennifer Kim	July 11, 2024
Using his newfound wealth in human teeth, Julius decides to expand his empire by buying buildings from their owners. Sammy, desiring to be in the spotlight once more, discovers an electronics store owned by a cereal box. After being ejected, an enraged Sammy attacks him and proceeds to hijack the store, where he continues his comedy act. While bringing a human foot for Jack to eat, Frank and Brenda discover that foods are being robbed of their teeth, prompting them and Barry to enforce a new police system. During a trial, Frank and Brenda discover that the foods accused of stealing teeth consist entirely of perishables, who are showing signs of molding and live in slum-like conditions due to their inability to afford Julius' refrigerated housing. Appearing on Sammy's newest show, Frank and Brenda propose that those who own lots of teeth should offer them to those who don't, but Julius, who is in the audience, manages to turn everyone against them by arguing that they're taking away everyone's freedom and suggests that they hold an election in order to determine a new leader for Foodtopia. Meanwhile, Barry discovers Jack's footprints, and Jack, realizing he has no other choice, resorts to cannibalism, tearfully eating the foot Frank and Brenda gave him earlier.
5	5	"Fifth Course"	Laura Krafft	July 11, 2024
Julius is establishing a capitalist system through his massage center, and has now become the owner of several businesses while actively campaigning to be elected as the leader of Foodtopia. Suddenly, Sammy is arrested after being reported by the cereal box for kicking him out of his building. Frank and Brenda make a case for fair distribution of wealth, only for Julius to get them removed through the task force, solely because he can. During Sammy's trial, Julius bribes the judge into ruling in Sammy's favor, putting Sammy under Julius' thumb so he can use the broadcasting system to propagate his propaganda against Frank and Brenda. Meanwhile, Barry is suspicious about the human footprint and investigates it. At the treehouse, Jack reveals that everything Frank and Brenda aim to do is exactly what human society was built on. Frank feels that they do not have enough teeth to influence other foods as Julius does and is influenced by Jack's proposal of stealing from Julius, but Brenda feels they should lead by example instead of influence. Back in the city, Frank comes across Sammy helping Julius' propaganda and confronts him, but Julius has clearly bought Sammy's loyalty. Ultimately, Frank decides to act on his "fast and furious" plan. Barry suspiciously follows him, but loses him midway. That night, Frank successfully carries out a heist of teeth while Brenda is busy doing her door-to-door campaigning. When Brenda comes across this heist, she is unable to support Frank, who had taken Jack's side, and they part ways sadly.
6	6	"Sixth Course"	Jeremy Levick & Rajat Suresh	July 11, 2024
Foodtopia is on high alert to find the culprit behind the theft of Julius' teeth. Since Frank disguised himself as a potato, all the potatoes find themselves in trouble. Barry overhears a conversation about the culprit being a tall sausage and becomes suspicious of Frank. Meanwhile, Jack helps Frank gain confidence to run for the elections, and they seem to become fast friends. Frank practices becoming the president under his guidance. Brenda is putting all her efforts into mobilizing votes from the slums. Barry confronts her, and she tells him everything about the living human. Meanwhile, Frank and Jack grow close, eventually engaging in sexual intercourse when Brenda and Barry catch them in the act, leading to Jack breaking free from being a hostage and fleeing to the woods, fearing for his life. Frank swears to love Jack, but draws a line with Barry secretly watching him, and they finally part ways. On election day, Brenda announces that she is campaigning individually and appeals for a toothless society, which is not taken well by the foods. She further discloses that Frank had sex with Jack, and both of them eventually bring each other down, resulting in Julius winning the election.
7	7	"Seventh Course"	Dewayne Perkins	July 11, 2024
As Julius proclaims himself the emperor of Foodtopia, the divide between the haves and have-nots has intensified. Sammy has completely turned to Julius' side and has certainly lost his way with his new mantra and personality. Frank apologizes to Barry and Brenda for his behavior, although only the latter forgives him, making Barry realize that good food can go bad but that there is redemption for them too. This realization comes after he watches Frank part ways with Jack. Barry talks to Sammy, who finds himself a slave to Julius. However, after Barry tries to make him realize his fault, stating to be aware of Lavash's death severely affecting him, Sammy turns violent and refuses to listen to reason, leading Barry to leave the place. Brenda goes to visit Julius to talk to him about the foods dying in the street but is not allowed a meeting. She hears sounds coming from the air vent and follows it to find Julius in captivity. She realizes that Julius is being controlled by a small rice grain named Jeri who felt neglected by all the selfish foods in Foodtopia after the war. When she secretly saw Barry controlling Jack through his anus, she decided to do the same and controlled Julius to fulfill her selfish agenda. She then takes control of Julius' body and engages in a fistfight with Brenda, ultimately deceiving her, removing herself from the orange, and opening the tap of the kitchen sink. In the meantime, Frank ends up in the kitchen to find Brenda torn up from the cutter in the drainage. Brenda dies in his arms while Jeri frames Frank by gaining control of Julius again.
8	8	"Eighth Course"	Kyle Hunter & Ariel Shaffir	July 11, 2024
The residents of Foodtopia grieve the loss of Brenda while Frank is imprisoned. The shock of Brenda's death even has Sammy finally make peace with Lavash's death along with hers. Julius asks Sammy to help him turn Frank into the perpetrator, but Sammy refuses, so he is replaced by "Dunkin Doughnut" as the host. Sammy and Barry then visit Frank, who denies murdering Brenda. After they leave, they come across Werner Herzdog, who shows them a clip of Brenda and Julius' tussle on the day of her murder, revealing Jeri to be the real culprit. Barry and Sammy plan to get this footage live before Frank is burned and killed on a barbecue. They visit Jack, who is living while eating the remains of his friend in the woods, and they persuade him to help Frank, so he throws a frisbee with Barry and Sammy hidden underneath through the vent of the broadcasting station. At the station, after a courageous fight, Sammy shows the video to the foods, claiming that Frank is innocent. Barry and the other foods save Frank, but Julius takes off running. Jack helps Barry catch Julius, squeezes Jeri out of his anus, and apprehends her. He tries to break her before Frank stops him and says that he forgives Jeri. Frank makes a case for the residents to forgive each other and start a new healthy and helpful society. Jeri feels grateful and emotional but is swiftly eaten by the crow. Despite Frank's passionate speech, the residents have gotten used to their new way of life and refuse to change. Instead, new foods nominate themselves for leader, and the powerful rule over the weak. Frank goes back to the treehouse dejected but remembers Brenda's message that the foods are their children and they need to fix Foodtopia. He invades an election with Jack's help and declares himself the leader, ordering that all food will follow him alone and that they can't be trusted to make their own decisions. Unbeknownst to everyone, a drone is secretly hovering and watching them from above.

=== Season 2 (2025) ===
No. overall	No. in season	Title	Written by	Original release date
9	1	"Ninth Course"	Kyle Hunter & Ariel Shaffir	August 13, 2025
Following Brenda's death, Frank becomes jaded and self-absorbed, attempting to maintain control of Foodtopia by enforcing equality through Jack, his human associate, as an enforcer. His governance alienates the food denizens, who resent both his leadership and Jack's presence. Despite warnings from Barry and Sammy, Frank ignores growing dissent. A faction led by Iced Tea, Julius, and Dunkin plots to assassinate Frank and Jack. Before Barry and Sammy can warn Frank, they are captured and coerced into negotiating the pair's exile in exchange for abandoning the assassination. They ultimately succeed in persuading Frank and Jack to leave by citing the threat, but are exiled from Foodtopia themselves due to their association with Frank.
10	2	"Tenth Course"	Dewayne Perkins	August 13, 2025
Feeling betrayed, Frank blames Barry for their exile, refusing to acknowledge his own failures as a leader. Jack proposes they leave Foodtopia and begin anew in his hometown, noting that foodkind now dominate the world and can live freely. Frank, Barry, and Sammy agree, but upon arrival they find the town deserted, its human inhabitants reduced to decaying corpses. While passing through nearby woods, they are attacked by massive tribe of feral wild berries that prey on humans, though Jack narrowly survives with the group's help. From there, the trio glimpses the distant cityscape of Newfoodland.
11	3	"Eleventh Course"	Jennifer Kim	August 13, 2025
Jack, Barry, Frank, and Sammy travel to New Foodland, a city built over Jack's former hometown. Barry, wary of Jack sobering from bath salts, suggests abandoning him, but the group continues onward. Unlike Foodtopia, New Foodland is shown to be more advanced, with greater resources and infrastructure. Barry urges caution, but their cover is blown when Sammy enters a movie theater, Frank engages a talking can, and Barry intervenes during a performance to protect a jar of mustard. The group is carried off by food citizens who celebrate their role in the revolution. Although Frank fears Jack is about to be executed, it is revealed that New Foodland instead rehabilitates humans, repairing and reintegrating them into society.
12	4	"Twelfth Course"	Kyle Hunter, Ariel Shaffir & Jack Berigan	August 13, 2025
As Jack recuperates, Frank, Barry, and Sammy are introduced to New Foodland's leader, Nutricia ("Trish"), who explains that the city has advanced by controlling surviving humans through symbiotic machines. With their aid in medicine, technology, and education, New Foodland has flourished. Trish invites Frank to join the city council and encourages Sammy's filmmaking ambitions by introducing him to director Francis Ford Capicola. Meanwhile, Barry begins a relationship with Dijon, the head of security, and Jack falls in love with another enslaved human, Jill. Frank pursues education while Sammy works on his movie, and Barry joins the security force alongside Dijon. Life appears ideal until Barry and Jack, during a security "refueling" mission, discover that New Foodlanders are exploiting enslaved humans to conquer food settlements through violence and consumption.
13	5	"Thirteenth Course"	Kyle Hunter & Ariel Shaffir	August 13, 2025
Barry abandons his security role after discovering the truth and warns Sammy and Frank. Meanwhile, Jack, who has adapted to consuming human flesh, grows disillusioned with his own kind. When Frank raises the issue before the city council, Trish and its members defend the exploitation of foodkind as a necessary sacrifice for the greater good. Jill encourages Jack toward self-acceptance and helps him recognize Frank's long-standing exploitation of him. Distraught, Barry briefly contemplates killing New Foodland's enslaved humans, but abandons the plan after realizing Jack's love for Jill and acknowledging the humanity of their captives. During a later council meeting, Frank learns that New Foodland intends to use the intelligence he shared to invade and conquer Foodtopia.
14	6	"Fourteenth Course"	Kyle Hunter, Ariel Shaffir & Jack Berigan	August 13, 2025
Frank informs Sammy, Barry, and Jack of New Foodland's plan to invade Foodtopia and resolves to warn his former community. Sammy refuses to leave, believing his film will inspire lasting change, while Jack resents continuing as Frank's subordinate. After an argument, Frank and Barry depart without Jack, who relapses into despair. Trish, aware of their plan, dispatches Jill—controlled by Dijon—to intercept them. Frank and Barry attempt to evade pursuit through the wild berry–infested woods, but Jill eliminates the tribe of wild berries. While hiding in a dead pumpkin, Barry unleashes his frustrations to Frank about his control freak nature, making Frank realize how bossy he's been. Meanwhile, at the premiere of Sammy's film, Trish mobilizes her forces, bringing enslaved humans and security troops to launch the invasion.
15	7	"Fifteenth Course"	Kyle Hunter, Ariel Shaffir & Jack Berigan	August 13, 2025
Inside Foodtopia, Frank and Barry discover the community thriving independently, with citizens embracing religion and venerating the late Brenda as a divine guardian. When the pair warn of New Foodland's invasion, they are dismissed and expelled, though the Foodtopians quietly prepare for a potential attack. Trish's forces soon arrive, but the scouts are repelled thanks to the warning. Trish then captures Frank and Jack, subjecting them to torture with Jill/Dijon's assistance in an effort to obtain intelligence on secret access points to Foodtopia. Frank refuses to betray the city, even during torture. Shifting tactics, Trish threatens Jill's life to coerce Jack. Meanwhile, Frank and Barry reconcile, acknowledging their mutual importance. Inspired by Frank's resilience, the Foodtopians intervene and free them from captivity.
16	8	"Sixteenth Course"	Kyle Hunter & Ariel Shaffir	August 13, 2025
Back in Foodtopia, Barry proposes using New Foodland's enslaved humans against their masters, while Frank seeks to reconcile with Jack after acknowledging his past mistreatment. Barry advocates for coexistence between food and humans, rejecting the violence of the earlier food–human war. Before the battle, Jack prepares a special delicacy for Jill and the other enslaved humans, later revealed to be a laxative mix. When New Foodland forces invade through hidden access points, Foodtopia suffers heavy losses as enslaved humans massacre its citizens. Barry, Frank, and Julius repel some attackers by expelling their food pilots, though Jill/Dijon proves a formidable adversary, ultimately killing Julius. Barry defeats Jack's pilot, True Gin, and urges Jack to help defend Foodtopia. During the fighting, Jill/Dijon nearly kills Barry, but Jack's concoction incapacitates the human army, freeing them from Foodlander control. Barry convinces Dijon to abandon the war, while Jack and Jill lead the liberated humans away from the conflict. As the humans attempt to depart, Trish tries to stop them, but Frank attaches an apology note to Jack's van before falling with Trish during a struggle; Trish is killed while Frank survives. Jack sees the note and finds closure. The humans are then intercepted by a military helicopter and taken to a remote base, where General Owens and his surviving U.S. troops reveal a secret weapon designed to upend the food world order.

== Production ==
=== Development ===
Seth Rogen had expressed interest in making a sequel to Sausage Party and more animated films aimed for adults. When asked about the possibility of a sequel, Rogen stated: "It's something we talk about, yeah. That's one of the reasons why we took away the [original] ending because we thought, well, if that was the first scene of the next movie it's probably not what you would want it to be, with them just seeing us and finding us basically. But the idea of a live-action/animated movie, like a Who Framed Roger Rabbit?-style hybrid, is also very exciting, mostly because Who Framed Roger Rabbit? is one of my favorite movies of all time."

On October 26, 2022, it was announced that Amazon had ordered a sequel from Point Grey Pictures, Annapurna Television, and Sony Pictures Television the co-writers Kyle Hunter and Ariel Shaffir returning to develop and executive produce the series under their production company Shaffirwhich while some of the cast (including Rogen, who co-wrote, co-produced, and created the film alongside creative partner Evan Goldberg) returning to reprise their roles, along with new members like Will Forte, Natasha Rothwell, Sam Richardson and Yassir Lester.

=== Animation ===
Unlike the first film being produced by Nitrogen Studios, the animation for the series was handled by Bardel Entertainment and Stellar Creative Lab. Co-producer/co-director Conrad Vernon returns as a supervising director.

== Release ==
Promotional poster for the first season

On May 1, 2024, it was announced that the series would premiere on Amazon Prime Video on July 11, 2024. A second season premiered on August 13, 2025.

== Reception ==
On review aggregator website Rotten Tomatoes, the series holds a 48% approval rating based on 25 reviews with an average rating of 5.7/10. The website's critics consensus reads: "Clean up on aisle three—Foodtopia has plenty of rancid gags to tide over fans of Seth Rogen's sense of humor, but this follow-up can't help but feel like stale leftovers." On Metacritic, which uses a weighted average, the series assigned a score of 54 out of 100 based on 16 critics, indicating "mixed or average reviews".
