= The Gutter (2024 film) =

Film by Isaiah and Yassir Lester

- Release poster
- Directed by: Isaiah Lester; Yassir Lester
- Written by: Yassir Lester
- Produced by: Liz Destro; Isaiah Lester; Yassir Lester
- Starring: Shameik Moore; D'Arcy Carden; Paul Reiser; Susan Sarandon
- Cinematography: Veronica Bouza
- Edited by: David Dean; Josh Porro
- Music by: Keegan DeWitt
- Production companies: Village Roadshow Pictures; Destro Films; ModelBoyz Entertainment
- Distributed by: Magnolia Pictures
- Release dates: March 12, 2024 (SXSW); November 1, 2024 (United States)
- Running time: 89 minutes
- Country: United States
- Language: English
- Box office: $17,750

The Gutter is a 2024 American sports comedy film written by Yassir Lester, and directed by Yassir Lester and Isaiah Lester. It stars Shameik Moore, D'Arcy Carden, Paul Reiser and Susan Sarandon. The Gutter premiered at SXSW on March 12, 2024 before being released by Magnolia Pictures on November 1, 2024 in the United States. The film received positive reviews from critics.

== Plot ==
Walt gets hired at a bowling alley where he meets Skunk, a former pro-bowler and drunk, and Brother Canda, a Hotep sidewalk speaker. A city inspector comes and tells the crew that unless they get $200,000 to fix the health code violations the bowling alley will be closed. Walt angrily throws a bowling ball, for the first time ever, and gets a perfect strike. Skunk decides to coach him, so they can win money and save the bowling alley. The two become close friends dressing in outrageous costumes, winning matches and getting sponsorships. Skunk is also excited about the possibility of Walt beating the records of retired bowler Linda Curson who is considered the best there ever was.

As he approaches Curson's records, Walt's success comes to the attention of Curson herself. Under the pressure of success Walt suddenly feels "there is something wrong with his ball" and he has his first loss. Walt keeps losing and ends the season having only beaten one of Curson's records. Curson then announces that she is returning to pro-bowling and reveals that her daughter is Skunk. Walt freaks out and feels betrayed because he believes Skunk, who hates her mom, was only using him to beat her mom's old records. Walt breaks up his partnership with Skunk and performs even worse.

At a funeral for two of their friends who died trying to steal Kohl's Cash, Skunk and Walt reconcile. They go to the Championship where Walt faces Curson. Walt realizes that Curson had changed the weight of his ball and that's why he began losing. However, in the fair final match both play exceptionally well and Walt loses. However, Brother Canda reveals its not all bad. By being the first "African-America championship losing bowler" the bowling alley is declared historic and no renovations are need. Later, Skunk, Walt and Brother Canda are shown to be leading classes teaching kids to bowl. They are interrupted by the arrival of the first black man to win a pro-bowling championship who reveals an all new line up of non-white bowlers, which Walt and Skunk vow to take on in the next tour.

== Cast ==
- Shameik Moore as Walt
- Susan Sarandon as Linda Curson
- D'Arcy Carden as "Skunk"
- Jay Ellis as "Lil Patience"
- Jackée Harry as Mozell
- Paul Reiser as Angelo
- Adam Brody as Building Inspector
- Kim Fields as Vicki
- Adam Pally as Deli Manager
- Paul Scheer as Crantley
- Langston Kerman as "Half Life"

== Release ==
The film premiered at South by Southwest on March 12, 2024. In August 2024, Magnolia Pictures acquired North American distribution rights to the film, scheduling it for a simultaneous release in theaters and video on demand on November 1, 2024.

== Reception ==
On the review aggregator website Rotten Tomatoes, 74% of 27 critics' reviews are positive, with an average rating of 6.2/10. The website's consensus reads: "A solid cast and sound jokes keep this modest comedy out of The Gutter and on track for a perfect strike."

Matt Donato of Collider rated the film a 7 out of 10. Lovia Gyarkye of The Hollywood Reporter gave the film a positive review and wrote, "...The Gutter — like an early Paul Beatty novel — seems destined to be a cult classic." Stephen Saito of Variety also gave the film a positive review and wrote, "Laughter strikes from all sides in The Gutter, the kind of brash and boisterous broad comedy that has largely been missing from multiplexes in recent years." Fletcher Peters of The Daily Beast gave the film a negative review and wrote, "But all in all, do these bonkers, fantastical edits to the game of bowling make The Gutter a fun, farcical ride? Well, also no."
