= Making History (TV series) =

American sitcom

- Genre: Sitcom
- Created by: Julius Sharpe
- Starring: Adam Pally; Leighton Meester; Yassir Lester; John Gemberling; Neil Casey
- Composer: Keegan DeWitt
- Country of origin: United States
- Original language: English
- No. of seasons: 1
- No. of episodes: 9

Production
- Executive producers: Julius Sharpe; Phil Lord Christopher Miller; Seth Cohen; Jared Hess
- Producers: Chris Smirnoff; Karen Kilgariff
- Cinematography: Xavier Grobet; Marvin V. Rush
- Editors: Sam Seig; Katie Abel; Andy Morrish
- Camera setup: Single-camera
- Running time: 22 minutes
- Production companies: Julius Sharpe International Petroleum & Writing; Lord Miller Productions; 20th Century Fox Television

Original release
- Network: Fox
- Release: March 5 – May 21, 2017

Making History is an American sitcom created by Julius Sharpe for the Fox Broadcasting Company. Executive-produced by Phil Lord and Christopher Miller and created and written by Sharpe, the show stars Adam Pally, Leighton Meester, and Yassir Lester.

== Plot ==
The series follows three friends from two different centuries as they experience the thrill of time travel and the unexpected results of it.

== Cast ==
- Adam Pally as Daniel "Dan" Chambers, janitor
- Leighton Meester as Deborah Revere, the eldest daughter of Paul Revere and his first wife Sarah Orne
- Yassir Lester as Chris Parrish, a history professor
- John Gemberling as John Hancock
- Neil Casey as Sam Adams

=== Recurring ===
- Brett Gelman as Paul Revere
- Tim Robinson as Al Capone
- Stephanie Escajeda as Mae Capone

== Production ==
=== Development ===
Originally planned for 13 episodes, Fox reduced the show to 9 episodes in October 2016. Making History was a joint production by Julius Sharpe International Petroleum & Writing, Lord Miller Productions and 20th Century Fox Television, and syndicated by 20th Television.

=== Casting ===
On February 24, 2016, Adam Pally was cast as Dan. On March 9, 2016, Leighton Meester was cast as Deborah. On March 17, 2016, Yassir Lester was cast as Chris.

On June 8, 2016, John Gemberling and Neil Casey (playing the roles of John Hancock and Sam Adams) were announced to join as series regulars.

=== Cancellation ===
On May 11, 2017, the series was cancelled after one season.

== Reception ==
On Rotten Tomatoes the series has a rating of 92% based on 25 reviews, with an average rating of 6.9/10. The site's critical consensus reads, "A high concept gone silly, Making History makes the grade with contemporary humor for historical themes and a funny, cartoonish execution of a serialized plot." On Metacritic, the series has a score of 64 out of 100, based on 24 critics, indicating "generally favorable reviews".

== Episodes ==
No.	Title	Directed by	Written by	Original release date	Prod. code	US viewers (millions)
1	"Pilot"	Jared Hess	Julius Sharpe	March 5, 2017	1AZH01	2.17
Dan, a facilities manager at a Massachusetts college, drives out to Lexington, runs into a ditch and after the sound of lightning, emerges in 1775 Lexington. That night, he and his girlfriend, Deborah, run into two British soldiers, after which Dan realizes the American Revolution has not started yet. Back in 2016, he recruits Chris, a history professor, to travel back in time to ensure the Revolution happens. At Buckman Tavern, Chris attempts to rouse the group into a revolt with a speech, but fails. They discover from John Hancock and Sam Adams that Paul Revere has been missing for a month, and Chris learns that Dan's girlfriend is Deborah Revere. Chris and Dan propose waging war against the British to Revere, but he is intent on killing Deborah's suitor. Dan tries breaking up with Deborah and admits he is from the future; she believes him, saying that his odd language now makes sense. Chris is captured by two British soldiers and after being rescued by Deborah, decides to fix the past while Dan and Deborah go back to 2016. Once there, they find a statue of Chris commemorating his death on April 24, 1775.
2	"The Shot Heard Round the World"	Jared Hess	Dominic Dierkes	March 12, 2017	1AZH02	1.83
Dan and Deborah return to the past in an effort to save Chris' life. They find him attempting to rally the colonists into fighting the British. Chris realizes that he can get the group motivated to fight by telling them the British are coming to take their guns, which is a success. Chris, Deborah and Dan plan on making this idea a reality. While Deborah dresses up as her father to warn those in Boston that the British are coming, Chris and Dan are captured and convince the British to march to Lexington to face the colonists. The two groups face off and the Battle of Lexington culminates with the colonists winning after Chris and Dan fire the shot heard round the world. After Deborah reveals she was the one who motivated them to fight, her father convinces the colonists to credit him for the midnight ride instead. Dan, Deborah and Chris return to 2016.
3	"The Boyfriend Experience"	Maggie Carey	Sarah Peters	March 19, 2017	1AZH03	1.59
Deb learns Dan has not been honest about his accomplishments in the future. Chris discovers his association with Dan is harming his standing with his colleagues.
4	"Chadwick's Angels"	Payman Benz	Craig DiGregorio	March 26, 2017	1AZH04	1.54
Dan, Chris and Deborah travel to the 1990s to correct Dan's greatest childhood regret: not finishing the gigantic "Belly Buster" ice cream sundae at an ice cream parlor. The owner of the shop had lost her passion for it until her mind is changed by an enthusiastic Deborah, who had never tasted ice cream before. Meanwhile, Chris narrowly saves a woman from being struck down by a vehicle in the street. At the parlor, Dan encounters his childhood bully and beats him up. He then sees the bully, in turn, retaliating on his young self, but finds a time barrier prevents him from intervening. Back in the present, the ice cream parlor owner is excited to see Deborah and runs into the street toward her, only to be run down by a vehicle driven by the same woman Chris had saved.
5	"The Touchables"	Eric Appel	Sean Clements	April 2, 2017	1AZH05	1.32
Deborah wants to buy an ice cream parlor, but needs $300,000. To get money, she, Dan and Chris travel to Chicago in 1919 to bet on the 1919 World Series, which was fixed. Identifying themselves as known New York gangsters (including Dan as Bugsy Siegel), they claimed to be associates of Al Capone. Capone hears of this and confronts them at a speakeasy. After some convincing, he agrees to let them accompany him on a heist, but realizes they are not real gangsters due to Deborah not knowing how to drive the getaway car. At his home, while Deborah talks with Capone's wife Mae in the kitchen, Dan and Chris are threatened with their lives. The time machine (duffel bag) is locked in Capone's vault.
6	"The Godfriender"	Peter Atencio	Karen Kilgariff	April 23, 2017	1AZH06	1.32
Despite helping Al Capone win a large sum of money betting on the 1919 World Series, Chris, Deb and Dan remain trapped in the past because Capone won't grant them access to his vault, where he has stashed their time machine. Deb and Dan attempt to gain Capone's trust in an effort to gain access to the vault, while Chris tries to thwart Capone by having him arrested for tax fraud. Capone eventually realizes both men are trying to betray him. He locks Chris in the vault, where Chris is able to use the time machine to escape, rescue Dan and Deb and return to the present with enough money to start an ice cream shop.
7	"Night Cream"	Jared Hess	Alison Agosti	April 30, 2017	1AZH07	1.41
Dan brings Adams and Hancock to the present to help Deb purchase the ice cream shop. Dan wants to give the ice cream shop a high-concept "adult" theme, but Deb favors something more family-friendly. Chris tries to use Adams and Hancock to further his academic career but the duo ultimately wreck his apartment and embarrass him at work.
8	"The Duel"	Claire Scanlon	Ted Travelstead	May 7, 2017	1AZH08	1.49
Hancock and Adams quarrel over love; decide on a duel with modern weapons.
9	"Body Trouble"	Iain B. MacDonald	Isaiah Lester	May 21, 2017	1AZH09	1.28
