= Gone (JR JR song) =

Single by JR JR

from the album JR JR
- Released: 2015
- Genre: Indie pop
- Length: 3:47
- Label: Warner Bros.
- Songwriter(s): Joshua Epstein; Mike Higgins; Dan Nigro; Daniel Zott
- Producer(s): JR JR; Ben West

"Gone" is a song by American indie pop band JR JR from their self-titled third album, JR JR in 2015. The song was written by the duo, along with Dan Nigro. The music video for the song was released on August 19, 2015.

== Music video ==
The music video begins with short clips of people who seem to be bothered, when their lower halves detach from their upper halves and run around, before they are seen dancing, walking, and enjoying themselves around a city. It also features a quick cameo of the band on a newspaper under a headline. The song ends with the duo on a television in an 8-bit animation style and some legs running towards the camera.

== Use in media ==
The song featured in the trailer and soundtrack of the movie Sausage Party, as well as in the 2016 movie Bad Moms.

The song was also used in the "Husky Boys" episode of Detroiters in 2017, a 2020 Chase Bank TV advertisement, and a Kinder Joy TV commercial the same year.

== Charts ==
=== Weekly charts ===
Chart (2015–16)	Peak position
US Hot Rock Songs (Billboard)	38
US Rock Airplay (Billboard)	17

=== Year-end charts ===
Chart (2016)	Position
US Hot Rock Songs (Billboard)	78
US Rock Airplay (Billboard)	35
