= Adam Pally =

American comedian and actor (born 1982)

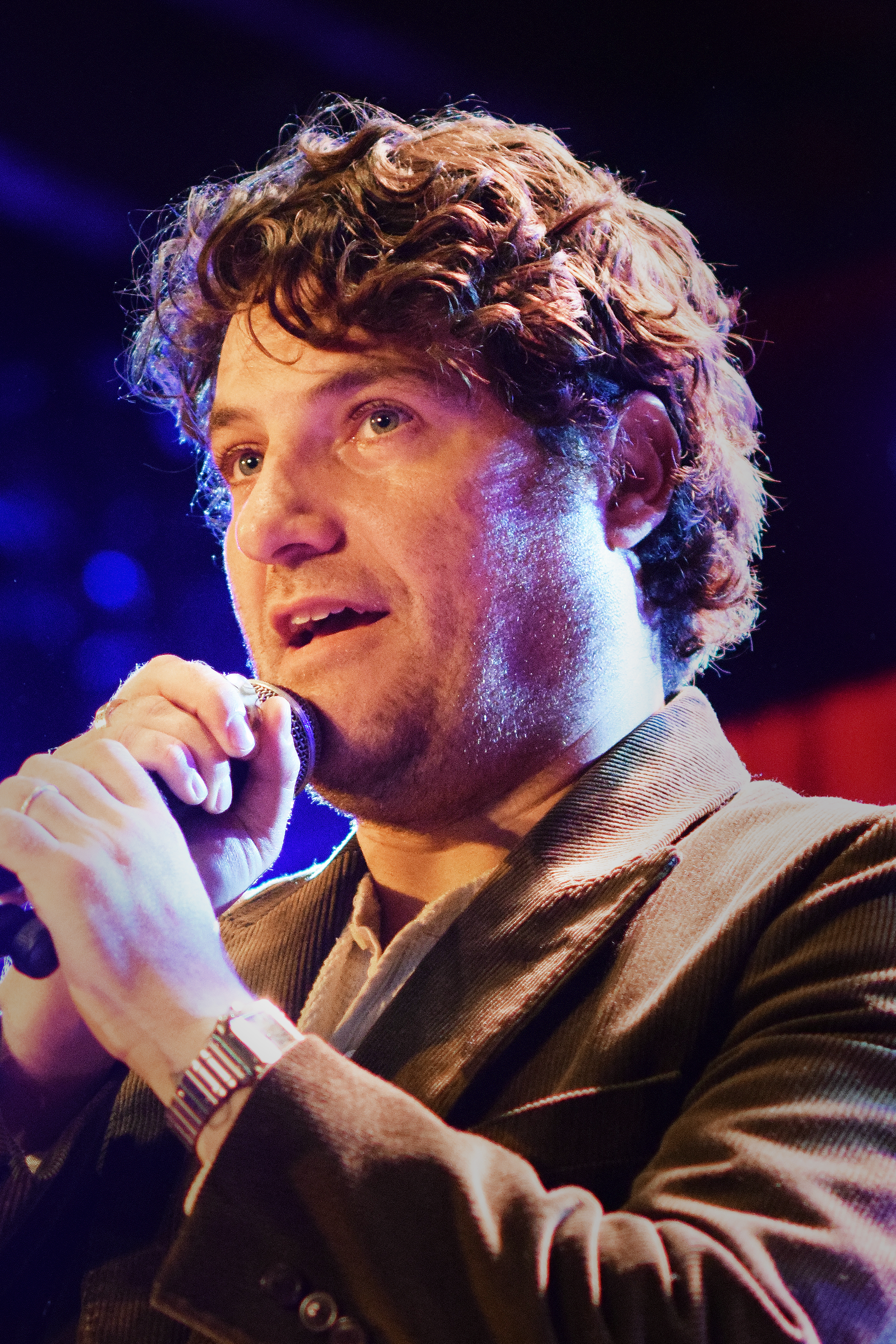
- Pally in 2023
- Born: Adam Saul Pally; March 18, 1982 (age 44); New York City, New York, U.S.
- Education: The New School
- Spouse: Daniella Liben (m. 2008)
- Children: 3

Comedy career
- Years active: 2002–present
- Medium: Television; film; web
- Genres: Improvisational comedy; sketch comedy; physical comedy; surreal humor; self-deprecation; black comedy; satire
- Subjects: American culture; everyday life; pop culture; current events; human behavior; social awkwardness; human sexuality

Adam Saul Pally (born March 18, 1982) is an American comedian and actor. He first earned recognition for starring as Max Blum in Happy Endings, as Dr. Peter Prentice in The Mindy Project, and as Wade Whipple in Sonic the Hedgehog (2020), its sequels, and the spin-off series Knuckles (2024). Pally also starred in Making History and was an executive producer of The President Show.

== Early life and education ==
Pally was born in New York City to Dr. Steven Pally, an internist who owns his own medical office, and Caryn Pally, who managed the practice in Florham Park, New Jersey. He is of Italian and Jewish ancestry, and was raised Jewish. He grew up in New York City, the Chicago area, and New Jersey, and has two sisters, Erica and Risa.

In 2004, Pally graduated from The New School University in New York City. He has performed improv and sketch comedy at the Upright Citizens Brigade Theatre (UCBT) in New York since 2002 and continues to perform in shows such as "Death by Roo Roo" and "ASSSSCAT 3000" at the theater's Los Angeles division. He is a member of the sketch comedy group "Chubby Skinny Kids" with comedians Dan Gregor and Doug Mand. Pally is also part of the improv group "Hot Sauce" with Gil Ozeri and Ben Schwartz; the group continues to perform their long-form improv show at UCBT occasionally.

== Career ==
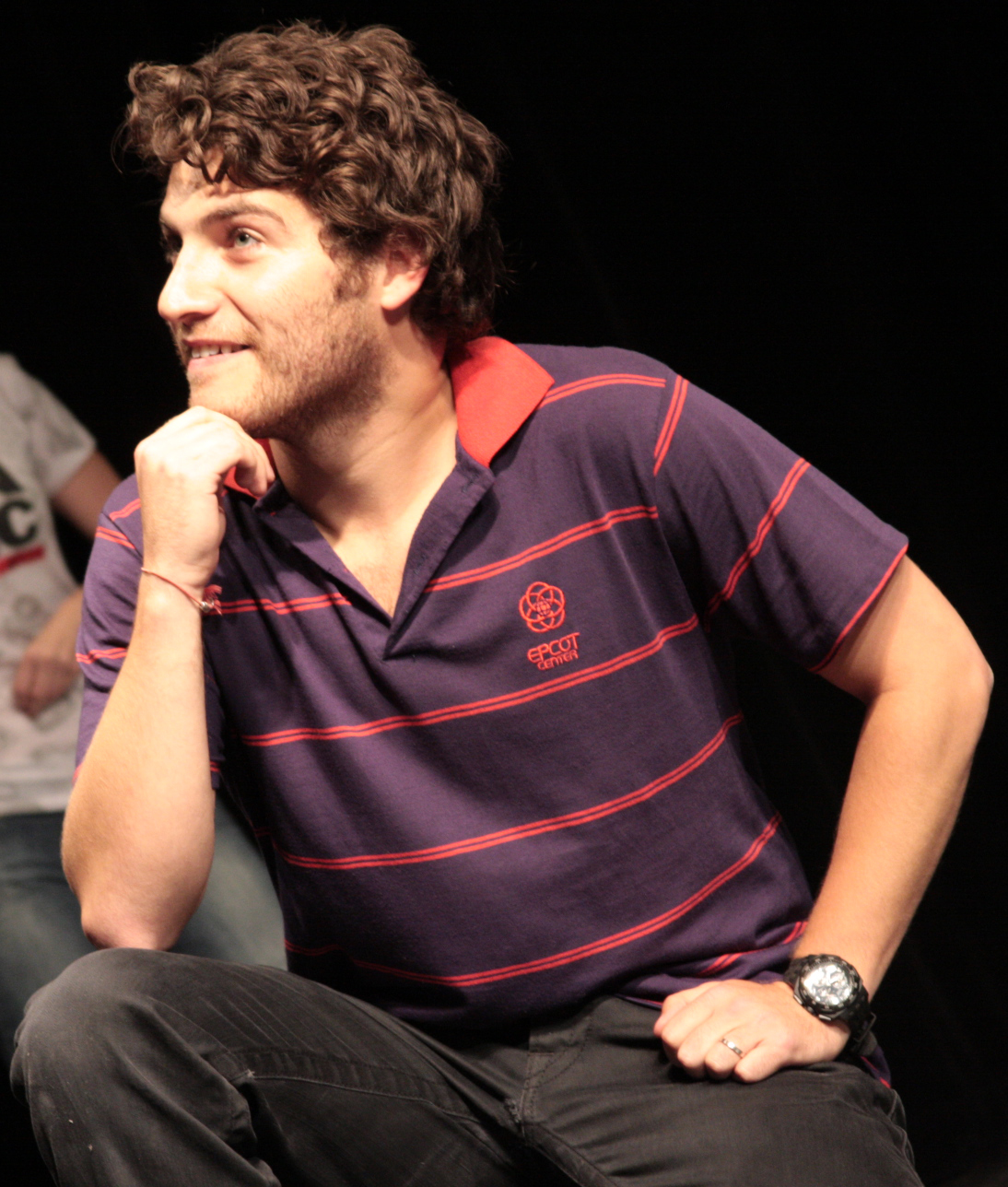
Pally in 2008

Pally has appeared in such films as Iron Man 3, Taking Woodstock, Solitary Man, Assassination of a High School President, The To Do List, A.C.O.D. and Slow Learners. He has made guest appearances on Last Week Tonight with John Oliver, Californication and The Colbert Report. He has written and appeared on the Adult Swim series NTSF:SD:SUV::. In 2012, it was reported that Pally and frequent collaborator Gil Ozeri wrote a script being produced by Will Ferrell & Adam McKay's company Gary Sanchez Productions.

From April 2011 to May 2013, Pally starred as Max Blum, one of the lead characters on the ABC ensemble comedy series Happy Endings, alongside Eliza Coupe, Elisha Cuthbert, Zachary Knighton, Damon Wayans Jr., and Casey Wilson. In 2013, Pally was nominated for "Best Supporting Actor in a Comedy Series" at the Critics' Choice Television Awards for his work on season three of Happy Endings. The cast reunited in July 2020 for the pandemic-themed episode "And the Pandemmy goes to..." to raise money for the charities Color of Change and World Central Kitchen.

Following the cancellation of Happy Endings in 2013, Pally joined the cast of The Mindy Project as a series regular for the second and third seasons, playing the role of Dr. Peter Prentice. He left the show midway through the third season, making his final appearances as a series regular in 2015.

Pally filmed a lead role opposite T.J. Miller and Thomas Middleditch in the comedy Search Party. This film serves as the directorial debut of screenwriter Scot Armstrong. He also starred in the indie films Slow Learners and Night Owls, both released in 2015.

=== Media contributions and appearances ===
Pally is a regular contributor to the humor website Funny or Die, where he is best known for his series Riding Shotgun with Adam Pally, in which he interviews celebrities in his car. In 2009, he created for UCB Comedy a parody of the "David After Dentist" internet phenomenon; his is called "David After Divorce," and he speaks almost exactly the same lines as David, though to a different set of questions. It received over 4.9 million views on YouTube.

In 2011, Pally co-starred in the comedic stage-show The Realest Real Housewives, created by his Happy Endings co-star Casey Wilson.

Pally has appeared regularly on many podcasts on the Earwolf network such as Comedy Bang! Bang!, improv4humans, Who Charted, and How Did This Get Made?.

On June 5, 2015, Pally and fellow comedian friends Gil Ozeri and John Gemberling gained attention when they teamed with Funny or Die to live-stream their 50-hour marathon of Entourage, watching every episode in a row with no breaks for 50 hours straight.

== Personal life ==
Pally lives in New York City. He married his high school sweetheart Daniella Anne Liben on July 3, 2008; the couple has three children: a son Cole (b. 2012), daughter Georgia Grace (b. 2013), and another son, Drake (b. 2017).

== Filmography ==
=== Film ===
Year	Film	Role	Notes
2008	Assassination of a High School President	Freddy Bismark	
2009	Taking Woodstock	Artie Kornfeld	
2009	Solitary Man	Irate Student	
2010	Monogamy	Allen	
2012	3, 2, 1... Frankie Go Boom	Brian	
2012	Primary Exit Polling	Voter	Short film
2013	A.C.O.D.	Mark	
2013	Iron Man 3	Gary	
2013	The To Do List	Chip	
2014	Life After Beth	Diner Sommelier	
2014	Search Party	Evan Hecketz	
2015	Night Owls	Kevin	
2015	Slow Learners	Jeff Lowrey	
2015	Bad Night	The Painter	Cameo
2016	Dirty Grandpa	Nick	
2016	Joshy	Ari	Also producer
2016	Don't Think Twice	Robbie	
2016	Middle School: The Worst Years of My Life	Mr. Teller	
2017	The Little Hours	Guard Paolo	
2017	Band Aid	Ben	
2017	Shimmer Lake	Reed Ethington	
2018	Most Likely to Murder	Billy Green	Also producer
2018	Dog Days	Dax	
2020	Omniboat: A Fast Boat Fantasia	Uncle Matt	
2020	Sonic the Hedgehog	Wade Whipple	
2020	The Main Event	Steve Thompson	
2022	Sonic the Hedgehog 2	Wade Whipple	
2022	Who Invited Charlie?	Charlie	
2023	Hell of a Summer	John	
2024	The Gutter	Deli Manager	
2024	The 4:30 Movie	Emo Usher	
2024	A Very Sonic Christmas	Santa	Voice, short film
2024	Sonic the Hedgehog 3	Wade Whipple	
2025	O Horizon	Sam	
2026	Goat	Gerald	Voice cameo
2028	The Beatles – A Four-Film Cinematic Event	Allen Klein	Filming
TBA	What the F*ck Is My Password?	TBA	Filming

=== Television ===
Year	Title	Role	Notes
2007–2011	Californication	Young Hollywood Douchebag	3 episodes
2008	The Colbert Report	Maverick Bully	Episode: "Charlie Cook/Andrew Sullivan"
2011	The Boys & Girls Guide to Getting Down	Bryce	Television movie
2011	Best Friends Forever	Joe	Pilot (original unaired version)
2011–2012	NTSF:SD:SUV::	Various	2 episodes; also writer
2011–2013	Happy Endings	Max Blum	Main role, 57 episodes Nominated – Critics' Choice Television Award for Best Supporting Actor in a Comedy Series (2013)
2013	The Jeselnik Offensive	Panelist	Episode: "Adam Pally and Casey Wilson"
2013	The Arscheerio Paul Show	Rosie O'Donnell	Episode: "Madonna & Rosie O'Donnell"
2013–2015	Kroll Show	Various	3 episodes
2013–2015	Comedy Bang! Bang!	Various	3 episodes
2013–2017	The Mindy Project	Dr. Peter Prentice	Main role (seasons 2–3), guest role (seasons 4–6); 44 episodes
2014–2015	Randy Cunningham: 9th Grade Ninja	Plop Plop (voice)	2 episodes
2015	The Late Late Show	Himself (host)	Episode that aired January 30
2015	BoJack Horseman	Trip (voice)	Episode: "Escape From L.A."
2015	Key & Peele	Adam	Episode: "The Job Interview"
2015–2017	Regular Show	Party Horse #42699 (voice)	4 episodes
2016	Lady Dynamite	Chad	Episode: "I Love You"
2016	Another Period	Virgil	Episode: "Harvard"
2016	Not Safe with Nikki Glaser	Himself	Episode: "Is That Your Belt?"
2016–2020	American Dad!	Various voices	4 episodes
2017	Animals.	Max (voice)	Episode: "Roaches."
2017	Making History	Dan Chambers	Main role, 9 episodes; also co-executive producer
2017	Do You Want to See a Dead Body?	Himself	Episode: "A Body and a Bachelor Party"
2017–2018	The President Show	Donald Trump Jr.	3 episodes; also executive producer
2018	The Who Was? Show	Game Show Host	Episode: "Gandhi & Benjamin Franklin"
2018	Champaign ILL	Ronnie	Main role; also executive producer
2019	The Mandalorian	Bike Scout Trooper #2	2 episodes
2019–2021	Archibald's Next Big Thing	Sage (voice)	Main role
2020	Indebted	Dave Klein	Main role; also co-executive producer
2020	Creepshow	Robert Weston	Episode: "A Creepshow Holiday Special: Shapeshifters Anonymous"
2020–2021	Crossing Swords	Broth (voice)	19 episodes
2021	DuckTales	Kit Cloudkicker (voice)	Episode: "The Lost Cargo of Kit Cloudkicker!"
2021–2022	Ziwe	Himself	2 episodes
2022	Solar Opposites	Linus (voice)	Episode: "The Pupa's Big Day"
2022	Star Trek: Lower Decks	Mesk (voice)	Episode: "Hear All, Trust Nothing"
2022	Impractical Jokers	Himself	Episode: "Adam Pally & Jon Gabrus"
2022	Would I Lie to You?	Himself	Episode: "Bunny Nanny"
2022	101 Places to Party Before You Die	Himself	8 episodes
2023	History of the World, Part II	Judas	Episode: "VIII"
2023–2025	FUBAR	The Great Dane	Recurring cast
2024	Knuckles	Wade Whipple	Main role
2024	Firebuds	Diamond Diesel Dave (voice)	2 episodes
2024	Mr. Throwback	Danny Grossman	Main role; also creator and executive producer
2024–2025	Last Week Tonight with John Oliver	Boeing Employee / Eagles fan	2 episodes
2025	The Simpsons	Ben (voice)	Episode: "Keep Chalm and Gary On"
2025	An Intimate Evening with Adam Pally	Himself	Television special
2026	Regular Show: The Lost Tapes	Party Horse (Voice)	Episode: Party Horse 4: Third Time's A Charm

=== Web ===
Year	Title	Role	Notes
2011	The Fuzz	Officer Chip Nelson	
2012	Happy Endings: Happy Rides	Max Blum	Also director
2020	Happy Endings: And the Pandemmy goes to...	Max Blum	Special charity episode
2026	Backyard Sports: The Animated Special	Pete Wheeler (voice)	Animated special

== Awards and nominations ==
Year	Award	Category	Work	Result
2013	Critics' Choice Television Award	Best Supporting Actor in a Comedy Series	Happy Endings	Nominated
