= Will Hines =

American comedian, writer, and actor

Will Hines is an American comedian, writer, and actor. He is best known as an improv performer and instructor. He co-founded the World's Greatest Improv School in Los Angeles. He has acted in television shows including Broad City, Wrecked, Arrested Development, The Sex Lives of College Girls, and Widow's Bay.

== Life and career ==
Hines was raised in Danbury, Connecticut. He enjoyed comedy from a young age and watched SNL regularly with his family. He received his bachelor's degree in English from University of Connecticut in 1992.

Hines worked as a journalist, a computer programmer, and as a video producer for AOL prior to taking an improv class at Upright Citizens Brigade (UCB) when he was 30. He eventually became an instructor and later relocated to Los Angeles, where he continued to perform and teach at UCB. He created the Tumblr blog Improv Nonsense, which informed his debut book How to Be The Greatest Improviser on Earth (2016). He also co-wrote the book Pirate Robot Ninja (2019) with Billy Merritt. In 2022 he co-founded the World's Greatest Improv School with Sarah Claspell and Jim Woods.

Hines has acted in supporting roles in Brooklyn Nine-Nine, Broad City, Wrecked, Search Party, Unbreakable Kimmy Schmidt, Adam Ruins Everything, Crazy Ex-Girlfriend, Community, Arrested Development, Kenan, The Sex Lives of College Girls, and Widow's Bay.

=== Podcasts ===
Hines is a frequent guest on improv comedy podcasts Comedy Bang! Bang! and Hollywood Handbook. He is also the creator of several podcasts including Screw It, We're Just Going to Talk About the Beatles and Hi(nes)! I'm Prov to Meet You.
