= Fat Guy Stuck in Internet =

Television series

- Genre: Comic science fiction; Comedy/Adventure
- Created by: John Gemberling; Curtis Gwinn
- Directed by: Ryan McFaul
- Starring: John Gemberling; Curtis Gwinn; Liz Cackowski; Neil Casey
- Country of origin: United States
- No. of seasons: 1
- No. of episodes: 10

Production
- Executive producers: John Gemberling; Curtis Gwinn; David Tochterman
- Producer: Michael Eder
- Running time: 11 minutes
- Production companies: Cowboy & John Productions; Williams Street

Original release
- Network: Adult Swim
- Release: May 14, 2007
- Release: June 22 – August 17, 2008

Related
- Gemberling; Munchies

Fat Guy Stuck in Internet is an American science-fiction comedy television series created by John Gemberling and Curtis Gwinn for Cartoon Network's late-night adult-oriented programming block Adult Swim; and ended with a total of ten episodes.

An adaptation/remake of Gemberling, Gemberling and Gwinn's 2005 Channel 102 web series, Fat Guy Stuck in Internet follows computer programmer Ken Gemberling – the titular "Fat Guy" – who is accidentally sucked into his computer and learns he is destined to save cyberspace from a variety of evils. After a pilot aired in May 2007, Adult Swim commissioned a full season of Fat Guy Stuck in Internet which lasted ten episodes, airing from June 2008 to August 2008. Following the run of its first season, the channel chose not to renew the show for a second, effectively cancelling the series.

== Setting and premise ==
Hotshot computer programmer Ken Gemberling is the top programmer at Ynapmoclive Interactive, but is also remarkably rude, selfish, and arrogant. After dumping beer on his computer keyboard, Gemberling is inexplicably sucked into his computer, landing in the farthest reaches of the internet where he soon discovers that he is in fact "The Chosen One", prophesied to save cyberspace from a devastating virus known as the nanoplague. Joined by a pair of humanoid "programs" named Bit and Byte, Gemberling embarks on an epic adventure to save the internet, return home and unleash the hero within, all the while hunted through cyberspace by ruthless white trash bounty hunter Chains.

== Production ==
Fat Guy Stuck in Internet first appeared as a 2005 web series created by Upright Citizens Brigade alumni John Gemberling and Curtis Gwinn, known as the comedy duo of The Cowboy & John. Originally titled Gemberling, the series followed the same storyline and major plot points of its television adaptation, featuring much of the same cast (with the notable exception of Katie Dippold in the role of Byte) though with a considerably lower budget and more profanity. Aired in five-minute episodes as part of Channel 102, Gemberling became Channel 102's longest-running original series, lasting a total of eight episodes including a 17-minute finale. The shorts also aired as part of Fuse TV's Munchies.

In January 2007, Cartoon Network announced that they had commissioned Gemberling and Gwinn to create a series based on Gemberling as part of the Adult Swim programming block. Adult Swim made the decision to rename the series as Fat Guy Stuck in Internet, a title which both creators disliked. The entirety of the series was filmed and produced inside of a warehouse in Bushwick, Brooklyn. On May 30, 2008, Gemberling and Gwinn premiered Fat Guy Stuck in Internet before a live audience at the Upright Citizens Brigade theatre in New York City.

Fat Guy Stuck in Internet uses a mix of greenscreen effects, hard sets, miniatures, matte paintings and computer animation to create the show's cyberspace environment, though carries over many of the intentionally low-budget props and special effects from the web series (e.g. broom handles being used as laser-shooting weapons, etc.).

The basic premise of Fat Guy Stuck in Internet is a parody of the film Tron, from which the series also borrows several visual elements. Gemberling and Gwinn have noted further parody and stylistic influence taken from The Matrix, Star Wars, The Lord of the Rings and Stephen King, in particular his Dark Tower series.

== Characters ==
From left to right: Bit (Neil Casey), Byte (Liz Cackowski) and Gemberling (John Gemberling).

- Gemberling (John Gemberling) – A skilled but slovenly programmer in real life otherwise recognized by his given internet handle of "Fat Guy Stuck in Internet", Gemberling is actually the prophesied savior of the internet, destined to save cyberspace from evil. At first a selfish jerk, Gemberling's quest brings out his inner goodness and strength as he learns the value of heroism and friendship.
- Chains (Curtis Gwinn) – A dim-witted redneck bounty hunter hired by the C.E.O. to track Gemberling through cyberspace, Chains is more interested in smoking pot and eating cyberchicken than doing his job. Chains eventually becomes Gemberling's troublesome sidekick.
- Byte (Liz Cackowski) – The sister of Bit, Byte is a humanoid computer program who aides Gemberling early in his quest, placing great confidence and belief in his abilities. She is later kidnapped by Chains and converted to evil by the C.E.O.
- Bit (Neil Casey) – Brother of Byte, Bit is another humanoid program who assists Gemberling in his adventure. Along with Byte, he is kidnapped by Chains and ultimately suffers his fate at the hands of his newly evil sister.
- The C.E.O. (John Gemberling) – The villainous (albeit inept) C.E.O. of Ynapmoclive Interactive, he controls the nanoplague which will destroy the internet.

== Episodes ==
No.	Title	Directed by	Written by	Original release date
1	"Threshold"	Ryan McFaul	John Gemberling & Curtis Gwinn	May 14, 2007
When cocky programmer Ken Gemberling is accidentally sucked into cyberspace, he reluctantly finds himself the center of an ancient prophecy, destined to save the internet from evil. When he and his new companions Bit and Byte are kidnapped by the villainous Kazaa, Gemberling has to channel the hero within to save his friends. Meanwhile, the bounty hunter Chains is sent into the internet to hunt Gemberling down. Guest starring Victor Varnado as Kazaa, Jon Daly as the Watcher Teacher, and mc chris as an uncredited office worker.
2	"Beast and Breakfast"	Ryan McFaul	John Gemberling & Curtis Gwinn	April 1, 2008 (Note: The second episode "Beast and Breakfast" aired on April 1, 2008, as part of a series of sneak peeks. The episode, along with other premieres, were a part of Adult Swim's annual April Fools' Day joke. The episode made its official debut on June 22, 2008, where it served as the official series premiere.)
Bit and Byte bring Gemberling before the wise elders known as The Order of the Blue Smoke in hopes of learning more about his destiny. To prove that he is The Chosen One, the elders send him on quest to slay a mythical beast, which culminates with Gemberling facing his inner demons inside a hotel located within the monster's ass crack. Guest starring Rich Fulcher as multiple wise men.
3	"Blue Screen of Death"	Ryan McFaul	John Gemberling & Curtis Gwinn	June 29, 2008
Chains follows Gemberling, Bit and Byte into Server City, where they're immediately attacked by zombies infected by a city-wide computer virus. Holing themselves up in an abandoned building, the trio of heroes attempt to plot an escape while Chains focuses on managing an all-zombie garage band. By the time Gemberling is able to destroy the virus and return Server City to normal, Chains gets away, with Bit and Byte in his captivity.
4	"Scrote of Trials"	Ryan McFaul	John Gemberling & Curtis Gwinn	July 6, 2008
While wandering alone through the internet desert, Gemberling is rescued from ravenous megabytes by reckless smuggler Hardrive and his companion the Insult-O-Bot, who agree to help him search for his kidnapped friends. Chains catches back up with Gemberling, and the two engage in space battle before crash-landing on an alien planet. Guest starring Paul Scheer as Hardrive.
5	"Eating with the Goddess"	Ryan McFaul	John Gemberling & Curtis Gwinn	July 13, 2008
As they sit tired and starving around a campfire, Chains and Gemberling reveal some unsettling truths about their past. In a parody of Dirty Dancing, Gemberling tells of his past heartbreak during the summer he taught "dirty computing" to the girl he loved. Chains recounts his troubled youth as a "teenage Dracula". Guest starring Rob Lathan as a high school bully.
6	"Atonement with the Bucket"	Ryan McFaul	John Gemberling & Curtis Gwinn	July 20, 2008
Following instructions from an encounter with Bit's spirit, Gemberling seeks out the all-powerful webmaster Linux to receive intensive training in the ways of the internet. Meanwhile, Chains discovers his own destiny when he is mistaken for The Chosen One by a tiny civilization who ask him to help settle a property dispute with a neighboring monster.
7	"Belly of the Skrales"	Ryan McFaul	John Gemberling & Curtis Gwinn	July 27, 2008
Eccentric pirate Captain Skrales (played by Brett Gelman) offers Gemberling and Chains safe passage across the internet ocean, but soon reveals an ulterior motive: at gunpoint, he forces the two to help him search the seas for his lost love Lorelei, a hideous sea monster.
8	"Blaster of Both Worms"	Ryan McFaul	John Gemberling & Curtis Gwinn	August 3, 2008
Gemberling and Chains find themselves in Datatown, a poor village savaged by a band of thugs called the Scuzzies, who are after their plentiful supply of silicon. Reluctantly recruited into battle, the pair must find a way to lead the townsfolk into victory by reviving an ancient species of giant worms, to which Gemberling unknowingly has the key.
9	"Boogie Baby, Boogie!"	Ryan McFaul	John Gemberling & Curtis Gwinn	August 10, 2008
In a parody of Labyrinth, Gemberling and Chains are trapped within a massive maze, and must traverse its many puzzles and obstacles in less than 72 hours or else be doomed to spend eternity as one of The Maze Master's dancing Sweetie Boys. Guest starring Matt Besser as The Maze Master and Sam Brown and Timmy Williams as The Guardians of the Doors.
10	"Gemberling's Requiem"	Ryan McFaul	John Gemberling & Curtis Gwinn	August 17, 2008
Gemberling's quest comes to a close when he and Chains reach the C.E.O.'s Tower. After a deadly battle with the evil Byte, Gemberling squares off face to face against the C.E.O. to fulfill his destiny and regain control of the internet. The season ends with an unresolved cliffhanger parodying the end of Back to the Future, with Gemberling and Chains traveling into the "internet future" in a beer-powered time machine.

== International broadcast ==
In Canada, Fat Guy Stuck in Internet previously aired on G4's Adult Digital Distraction block, and on the Canadian version of Adult Swim.

== Reception ==
Fat Guy Stuck in Internet received mixed reviews from viewers and critics. The A.V. Club, having reviewed every episode as part of their "Adult Swim Sunday" column, was one of the series' harsher critics, primarily criticizing the show's "cheap" writing, poor movie parodies and John Gemberling's "smirking, mediocre" performance. As the series progressed, however, the reception became a bit warmer, with later episodes being called "not completely terrible" and "not entirely unpleasant" to the final episode being described as "going out with a bang", the reviewer admitting "for a couple minutes, I actually found myself engaged". Time looked positively on the series, noting the show "delivers", being "striking-looking and even good-hearted in its own bizarre way".
