= JR JR =

American indie-pop band

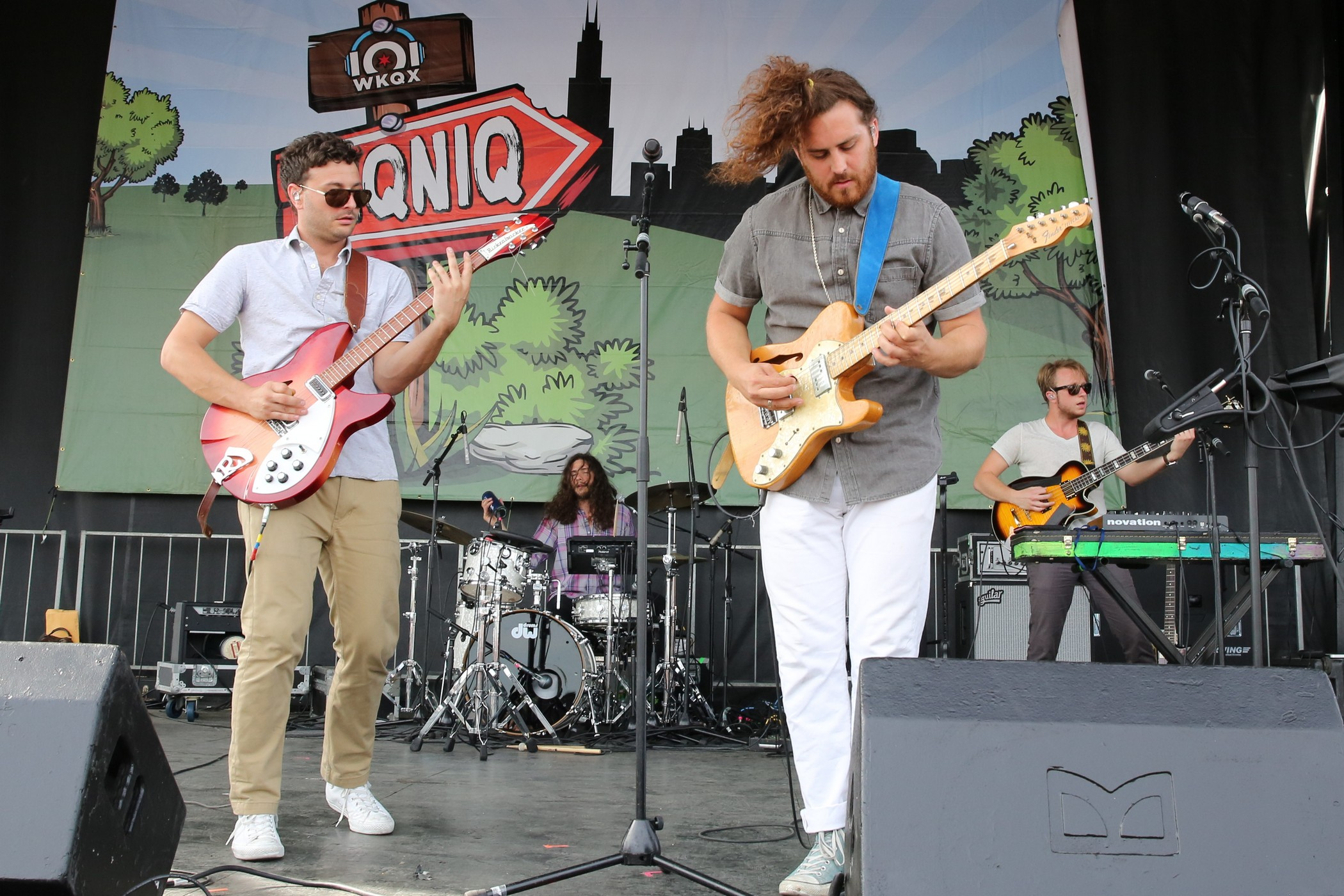
- JR JR Performing at Piqniq 2016 in Tinley Park, Illinois

Background information
- Also known as: Dale Earnhardt Jr. Jr.
- Origin: Royal Oak, Michigan
- Genre: Indie pop
- Years active: 2010–present
- Label: Warner Bros.
- Members: Daniel Zott; Joshua Epstein; Mike Higgins; Jon Visger; Bryan Pope
- Website: www.jrjrmusic.com

JR JR (pronounced "junior junior"; originally named Dale Earnhardt Jr. Jr.) is an American indie-pop band from Royal Oak, Michigan, founded by Daniel Zott and Joshua Epstein. The band also includes drummer Mike Higgins.

== History ==
Zott and Epstein met each other while playing in other Detroit music projects. They formed Dale Earnhardt Jr. Jr. in late 2009, and began recording in Zott's basement in Royal Oak, Michigan with few intentions of reaching the public. Their original name, derived from NASCAR driver Dale Earnhardt Jr., was suggested to the pair as a joke. In 2013 Zott stated, "The name for us was just a way to identify our crazy new project that had no limitations. People have no idea how we are going to sound, and so it gives them a reason to actually take some time to listen to the music." About 2011, the band emailed Dale Earnhardt Jr. to assure him they were not making fun of him; he responded that Jimmie Johnson had already told him about them, he was flattered, and they would "not hear from any lawyers".

=== 2010–2011: Horsepower (EP) and It's A Corporate World ===
In July 2010, the band released Horsepower EP via Quite Scientific Records. The Horsepower EP consisted of songs "Nothing But Our Love," "Vocal Chords," "Simple Girl," and a cover of Brian Wilson's song "God Only Knows." The band came out with a second EP titled "My Love Is Easy: Remixes Pt.1" via Quite Scientific Records on November 2, 2010. Dale Earnhardt Jr. Jr. was noted as 'one of the best new bands' of 2010 and became very well-liked from various sources including Stereogum, SPIN, Under the Radar, Real Detroit, and The Metro Times. The band came out with We Almost Lost Detroit EP via Warner Bros. Records and Quite Scientific Records on April 21, 2011. Dale Earnhardt Jr. Jr. released two singles, "Morning Thought" and "Simple Girl" on April 8, 2011 and September 9, 2011 respectively.

Dale Earnhardt Jr. Jr. came out with their first full-length album, It's A Corporate World. The album was released June 7, 2011 via Warner Bros. Records and Quite Scientific Records.

=== 2013–2015: Patterns (EP) and The Speed of Things ===
The band came out with their single "If You Didn't See Me (Then You Weren't On The Dancefloor)" on April 2, 2013. The single's release was followed by their EP release, Patterns. The band performed live on May 16, 2013 on KCRW's Morning Becomes Eclectic to premier songs from their album. The featured songs included: "Hiding," "Run," "Mesopotamia," "If You Didn't See Me (Then You Weren't On The Dancefloor)," "Dark Water," "Knock Louder," "War Zone," "Don't Tell Me," and "I Think Of You." They performed on Conan, June 11, 2013, featuring the song "If You Didn't See Me (Then You Weren't On The Dancefloor)."

Patterns EP was released on April 16, 2013, consisting of four songs: "If You Didn't See Me (Then You Weren't On The Dancefloor)," "Dark Water," "Hiding," and "Habits." The band released their second studio album titled, The Speed of Things, on October 8, 2013, with some guidance from Paul Simon. Dale Earnhardt Jr. Jr. went on tour with Atlas Genius and Family of the Year in the fall of 2013. The band released their mixtape "Produce Vol. 1" on February 5, 2014. Produce Vol. 1 is a new step for the band as they continue their journey towards the spotlight.

=== 2015–present: Name change and JR JR ===
On July 15, 2015, the band announced that they were renaming themselves to JR JR to end confusion with the NASCAR driver: "We've had people drive long distances to shows only to be disappointed when they realize it's a neurotic Jew and wild haired gentile from Detroit they've paid to see." They premiered their new single "Gone" from their self-titled album on July 16, 2015.

== Discography ==
=== EPs ===
All tracks are written by Joshua Epstein & Daniel Zott except as noted.

Horse Power (EP), Quite Scientific Records, July 13, 2010
No.	Title	Writer(s)	Length
1.	"Nothing But Our Love"		4:06
2.	"Vocal Chords"		3:52
3.	"Simple Girl"		2:23
4.	"God Only Knows" (Beach Boys cover, original 1966)	Brian Wilson, Tony Asher	3:13
Total length:			13:34

My Love Is Easy: Remixes Pt.1 (EP), Quite Scientific Records, November 2, 2010
No.	Title	Length
1.	"Nothing But Our Love" (Kasper Bjørke Remix)	4:58
2.	"Vocal Chords" (Deastro Remix)	4:46
3.	"Nothing But Our Love" (Prussia Remix)	3:45
4.	"Vocal Chords" (Diego and The Dissidents Remix)	3:34
Total length:		17:03

We Almost Lost Detroit (EP), Warner Bros. / Quite Scientific Records, April 21, 2011
No.	Title	Length
1.	"We Almost Lost Detroit (Gil Scott Heron Cover)"	3:22
2.	"Like a Prayer (Madonna Cover)|"	5:37
3.	"I Think of You (Sixto Rodriguez Cover)"	3:14
4.	"We Almost Lost Detroit (Stepdad Remix)"	3:48
5.	"Morning Thought (Phantasmagoria Remix)"	3:50
6.	"Simple Girl (Chuck Daniels Remix)"	6:45
Total length:		26:36

Patterns (EP), Warner Bros., April 20, 2013
No.	Title	Length
1.	"If You Didn't See Me (Then You Weren't On The Dancefloor)"	4:34
2.	"Dark Water"	3:05
3.	"Hiding" (Horns – John Rutherford)	3:08
4.	"Habits"	2:53
Total length:		13:40

=== Albums ===
All tracks are written by Joshua Epstein & Daniel Zott except as noted.

It's a Corporate World, Warner Bros. Records / Quite Scientific Records, June 7, 2011
No.	Title	Writer(s)	Length
1.	"Morning Thought"		3:36
2.	"Nothing But Our Love"		4:06
3.	"Skeletons"		2:19
4.	"An Ugly Person on a Movie Screen"		3:12
5.	"When I Open My Eyes"		4:14
6.	"Husbands (Interlude)"		0:55
7.	"It's a Corporate World"		2:54
8.	"Simple Girl"		2:23
9.	"If It Wasn't You..."		3:50
10.	"Vocal Chords"		3:52
11.	"We Almost Lost Detroit" (Gil Scott-Heron & Brian Jackson cover, original 1977)	Gil Scott-Heron & Brian Jackson	3:20
12.	"The Fisherman"		2:50
Total length:			37:25

All tracks are written by Joshua Epstein & Daniel Zott except as noted.

The Speed of Things, Warner Bros. Records, October 8, 2013
No.	Title	Length
1.	"Beautiful Dream"	4:12
2.	"Run"	2:57
3.	"Knock Louder"	3:43
4.	"If You Didn't See Me (Then You Weren't On The Dancefloor)"	4:07
5.	"I Can't Help It"	3:01
6.	"Hiding"	3:06
7.	"Beautiful Dream (Reprise)"	1:53
8.	"Mesopotamia"	4:32
9.	"Dark Water"	3:09
10.	"Don't Tell Me"	4:02
11.	"Gloria"	3:20
12.	"A Haunting"	5:39
13.	"War Zone"	6:01
Total length:		49:35

All tracks are written by Joshua Epstein & Daniel Zott except as noted.

JR JR, Warner Bros. Records, September 25, 2015
No.	Title	Length
1.	"As Time Goes"	3:25
2.	"Gone"	3:47
3.	"Caroline"	3:32
4.	"In the Middle"	3:35
5.	"For My Brother"	3:34
6.	"Philip the Engineer"	3:35
7.	"Hypothetical"	3:27
8.	"James Dean"	2:55
9.	"In My Mind (Summertime)"	4:38
10.	"Break My Fall"	3:15
11.	"Electrical Energy"	3:10
12.	"Listening to Outkast, June 23, 2014"	3:35
Total length:		42:28

All tracks are written by Joshua Epstein & Daniel Zott except as noted.

Invocations / Conversations, Love Is EZ Records / May 31, 2019
No.	Title	Length
1.	"Day in, Day Out"	4:09
2.	"All Around You"	3:53
3.	"Pull You Close"	3:58
4.	"Holding On"	4:08
5.	"Twice As Hard"	3:18
6.	"Wild Child"	3:24
7.	"Won’t Last Long"	3:39
8.	"Too Good to Be True"	3:22
9.	"NYC"	3:41
10.	"Low"	3:18
11.	"Dumb Myself Down"	4:18
12.	"Big Bear Mountain"	3:20
13.	"Bad Dreams"	3:08
14.	"Young Forever"	4:04
15.	"RIP RnR"	3:21
16.	"Fade Out"	3:47
Total length:		58:48

=== Singles ===
- "Morning Thought" (digital single, April 8, 2011)
- "Simple Girl" (digital single, September 9, 2011)
- "If You Didn't See Me (Then You Weren't On The Dancefloor)" (digital single, April 2, 2013)
- "Gone" (digital single, July 17, 2015)
- "Same Dark Places" (digital single, April 5, 2017)
- "Clean Up" (digital single, August 28, 2017)
