= John Gemberling =

American actor and comedian

- Gemberling in 2026
- Born: February 1, 1981 (age 45); New York City, New York, U.S.
- Occupations: Actor, comedian
- Spouse: Andrea Rosen (m. 2012)
- Children: 2

John Gemberling (born February 1, 1981) is an American actor and comedian best known for roles as Bevers on the Comedy Central series Broad City, as Gil on the NBC sitcom Marry Me, and as John Hancock on the Fox sitcom Making History. He also portrayed Steve Bannon on Comedy Central's political satire late night series The President Show, and Griff in the second season of Mixed-ish.

== Life and career ==
Gemberling was born and raised in New York City. As a teenager, Gemberling was the lead singer of the late-1990s New York–based ska band The Loose Nuts, whose credits included opening for The Mighty Mighty Bosstones at the Roseland Ballroom and having a song featured on the American Pie soundtrack.

Gemberling has appeared in films such as Palindromes, Blackballed: The Bobby Dukes Story and Twisted Fortune. He has made guest appearances on television programs such as American Dad!, Comedy Bang! Bang!, Angie Tribeca, Delocated, Happy Endings, The Office, Super Fun Night, and Key & Peele. Gemberling has been a regular performer at the Upright Citizens Brigade Theatre for over 10 years. He was half of the comedy duo "The Cowboy & John" with comedian Curtis Gwinn, with whom he also created and starred with on the Adult Swim series, Fat Guy Stuck in Internet. He has also played characters including Mr. Chandler on several MC Chris albums. In 2010, he starred in the short-lived Cartoon Network series Robotomy as Blastus, who is the best friend of the show's protagonist Thrasher, who is played by Patton Oswalt.

In 2014, he co-starred alongside Casey Wilson and Ken Marino in the NBC sitcom Marry Me, playing the role of Gil. On June 5, 2015, Gemberling and fellow comedian friends Gil Ozeri and Adam Pally gained attention when they teamed with Funny or Die to live-stream their 50-hour marathon of Entourage, watching every episode in a row with no breaks for 50 hours straight.

In 2017, he co-starred on the Fox time-travel comedy Making History, playing the role of John Hancock. Gemberling writes for Comedy Central's The President Show, where he also has a recurring role as Steve Bannon. Gemberling also has a recurring role as Bevers on the Comedy Central series Broad City. Gemberling portrayed John Belushi in the Netflix film A Futile and Stupid Gesture, a biopic of National Lampoon co-founder Douglas Kenney.

In 2018, he voiced Doofus Drake in DuckTales. He also voiced Tyler the Hormone Monster in season 2 of the Netflix series Big Mouth.

In 2021, he portrayed Griff in the second season of Mixed-ish in a main role.

== Personal life ==
Gemberling married comedic actress Andrea Rosen in 2012 and they have two sons.
