= Endorsements in the 2020 Democratic Party presidential primaries =

This is a list of endorsements for declared candidates in the Democratic primaries for the 2020 United States presidential election.

== Withdrawn candidates ==
=== Michael Bennet ===
List of Michael Bennet endorsements

U.S. senators

- Gary Hart, former U.S. senator from Colorado (1975–1987); candidate for president in 1984 and 1988

U.S. representatives

- Jared Golden, U.S. representative from ME-2 since 2019

Statewide officials

- John Hickenlooper, former governor of Colorado (2011–2019), former 2020 presidential candidate, and 2020 U.S. Senate candidate
- Bill Ritter, former governor of Colorado (2007–2011)
- Roy Romer, former governor of Colorado (1987–1999) and distinguished party leader as former DNC chair
- Joan Bolin Betts, former deputy treasurer of Iowa and former assistant attorney general of Iowa (previously endorsed Beto O'Rourke)

State legislators

- Michael Cahill, New Hampshire state representative from Rockingham District 17 since 2012
- Peter Groff, former Colorado state senator from District 33 (2003–2009) and president of the Colorado State Senate (2007–2009); former Colorado state representative from District 7 (2001–2003); former director for the Faith Based and Neighborhood Partnerships Center at the U.S. Department of Education (2009–2010)

Local officials

- Patrick White, former Johnson County district attorney, Iowa (1982–2006)

Party officials

- James Carville, political science professor, political analyst and media commentator, and head strategist of Bill Clinton's presidential campaign in 1992

=== Steve Bullock ===
List of Steve Bullock endorsements before withdrawal

U.S. senators

- Jon Tester, U.S. senator from Montana since 2007

State officials

- Tom Miller, attorney general of Iowa since 1995 and 1979–1991 (endorsed Joe Biden after Bullock withdrew from the race)

State legislators

- Staci Appel, former Iowa state senator for District 37 (2007–2011) (endorsed Joe Biden after Bullock withdrew from the race)
- Bruce Bearinger, Iowa state representative for District 63 since 2013 (endorsed Amy Klobuchar after Bullock withdrew from the race)
- Bill Gannon, former Iowa state representative for District 66 (1965–1971) and former House Minority Floor Leader (endorsed Amy Klobuchar after Bullock withdrew from the race)

Local officials

- Marty Pottebaum, Woodbury County supervisor from 3rd District, Iowa (2016–present)

Party officials

- Jan M. Bauer, former Story County, Iowa Democratic Party chair (1997–2019) and DNC member

Individuals

- Scooter Braun, businessman and co-organizer of March for Our Lives
- Jeff Bridges, actor
- Jeffrey Katzenberg, film producer

=== Julian Castro ===
List of Julian Castro endorsements before withdrawal

U.S. executive branch officials

- Henry Cisneros, former U.S. Secretary of Housing and Urban Development (1993–1997); former mayor of San Antonio, Texas (1981–1989) (endorsed Joe Biden after Castro withdrew from the race)

U.S. representatives

- Colin Allred, U.S. representative from TX-32 since 2019 (endorsed Joe Biden after Castro withdrew from the race)
- Joaquin Castro, U.S. representative from TX-20 since 2013; Castro's twin brother (endorsed Elizabeth Warren after Castro withdrew from the race)
- ~~Vicente Gonzalez, U.S. representative from TX-15 since 2017~~ (switched endorsement to Biden)

State legislators

- Roberto Alonzo, former Texas state representative from District 104 (1993–2019) (endorsed Joe Biden after Castro withdrew from the race)
- Rafael Anchia, Texas state representative from District 103 since 2005 (endorsed Joe Biden after Castro withdrew from the race)
- Diego Bernal, Texas state representative from District 123 since 2015
- César Blanco, Texas state representative from District 76 since 2015 (previously supported Beto O'Rourke)
- John Bucy III, Texas state representative from District 136 since 2019
- Terry Canales, Texas state representative from District 40 since 2013
- Jacob Candelaria, New Mexico state senator from District 26 since 2013
- Martin Chávez, former New Mexico state senator from District 23 (1987–1993); former Mayor of Albuquerque (1993–1997, 2001–2009)
- Norma Chávez, former Texas state representative from District 76 (2007–2001)
- Philip Cortez, Texas state representative from District 117 2013–2015 and since 2017
- Jessica Farrar, former Texas state representative from District 148 (1995–2019) (previously supported Beto O'Rourke)
- Art Fierro, Texas state representative from District 79 since 2019 (previously supported Beto O'Rourke; endorsed Elizabeth Warren after Castro withdrew from the race)
- Edgar Flores, Nevada Assemblyman from District 28 since 2014
- Red Dawn Foster, South Dakota state senator from District 27 since 2019
- Bruce Franks Jr., former Missouri state representative from District 78 (2016–2019)
- Mary González, Texas state representative from District 75 since 2013 (endorsed Elizabeth Warren after Castro withdrew from the race)
- Ryan Guillen, Texas state representative from District 31 since 2003 (endorsed Joe Biden after Castro withdrew from the race)
- Abel Herrero, Texas state representative from District 34 since 2013 (previously supported Beto O'Rourke; endorsed Joe Biden after Castro withdrew from the race)
- Juan Hinojosa, Texas state senator from District 20 since 2003 (endorsed Joe Biden after Castro withdrew from the race)
- Jennifer Jermaine, Arizona state representative from District 18 since 2019
- Jennifer Longdon, Arizona state representative from District 24 since 2019
- Oscar Longoria, Texas state representative from District 35 since 2013 (previously supported Beto O'Rourke)
- Ray Lopez, Texas state representative from District 125 since 2019
- Eddie Lucio Jr., Texas state senator from District 27 since 1991
- Eddie Lucio III, Texas state representative from District 38 since 2007 (endorsed Joe Biden after Castro withdrew from the race)
- Carlos Mariani, Minnesota state representative from District 65B since 1991
- Armando Martinez, Texas state representative from District 39 since 2005 (endorsed Joe Biden after Castro withdrew from the race)
- Javier I. Martinez, New Mexico state representative from District 11 since 2015
- Terry Meza, Texas state representative from District 105 since 2019
- Joe Moody, Texas state representative from District 78, 2009–2011 and since 2013; speaker pro tempore of the Texas House of Representatives since 2019 (previously supported Beto O'Rourke; endorsed Elizabeth Warren after Castro withdrew from the race)
- Christina Morales, Texas state representative from District 145 since 2019
- Sergio Muñoz, Texas state representative from District 36 since 2011
- Poncho Nevárez, Texas state representative from District 74 since 2013
- Chente Quintanilla, former Texas state representative from District 75 (2003–2013)
- Ana-Maria Ramos, Texas state representative from District 102 since 2019 (previously supported Beto O'Rourke)
- Richard Raymond, Texas state representative from District 44 1993–1999 and since 2001
- José R. Rodríguez, Texas state senator from District 29 since 2011 and Texas Senate Minority Leader since 2015 (previously endorsed Beto O'Rourke; endorsed Elizabeth Warren after Castro withdrew from the race)
- James Talarico, Texas state representative from District 52 since 2018
- Arlando Teller, Arizona state representative from District 7 since 2019
- Raquel Teran, Arizona state representative from District 30 since 2019
- Selena Torres, Nevada Assemblywoman from District 3 since 2018 (co-endorsed Booker, who withdrew after Castro; endorsed Joe Biden after Booker withdrew from the race)
- Leticia Van de Putte, former Texas state senator from District 26 (1999–2013); former Texas state representative from District 115 (1991–1999) (endorsed Joe Biden after Castro withdrew from the race)
- Hubert Vo, Texas state representative from District 149 since 2005
- Armando Walle, Texas state representative from District 140 since 2009
- Gene Wu, Texas state representative from District 137 since 2013 (previously supported Beto O'Rourke)

Local officials

- María Antonietta Berriozábal, former San Antonio City Councilwoman (1981–1991) from District 1 and the first Hispanic woman to serve on San Antonio City Council
- Alondra Cano, Minneapolis City Councilman for Ward 9 since 2014
- Daniel Corona, Mayor of West Wendover, Nevada since 2016 (endorsed Elizabeth Warren after Castro withdrew from the race)
- Kathy Durham, West Wendover city councilwoman since 2018
- Noel Gallo, Oakland City Councilman since 2013
- Shirley Gonzales, San Antonio City Councilwoman for 5 since 2013 (endorsed Elizabeth Warren after Castro withdrew from the race)
- Jocabed "Joca" Marquez, San Marcos City council member since 2018
- Ron Nirenberg, mayor of San Antonio, Texas since 2017 (Independent)
- Bryan Osorio, Delano city council member since 2018
- Manny Peláez, San Antonio City Councilman for District 8 since 2017 (endorsed Elizabeth Warren after Castro withdrew from the race)
- Rey Saldaña, former San Antonio City Councilman 4 (2011–2019)
- Ana Sandoval, San Antonio City Councilwoman for District 7 since 2017
- Gloria Soto, city council member for Santa Maria from District 3 since 2019
- Roberto C. Treviño, San Antonio City Councilma for District 1 since 2014 (endorsed Elizabeth Warren after Castro withdrew from the race)
- Rebecca Viagran, San Antonio City Councilwoman for District 3 since 2013
- Nelson Wolff, county judge of Bexar County, Texas since 2001; former mayor of San Antonio (1991–1995) (endorsed Joe Biden after Castro withdrew from the race)

Party officials

- Bonnie Brown, Iowa Democratic Party State Central Committee member (endorsed Elizabeth Warren after Castro withdrew from the race)
- Derek Eadon, former chair of the Iowa Democratic Party (2017) (endorsed Bernie Sanders after Castro withdrew from the race)
- Carol Little, former chairwoman of the Nye County, Nevada Democratic Party
- Mary Jo Riesberg, Lee County, Iowa Democratic Party chair

Individuals

- Cristela Alonzo, actress, comedian, producer and writer
- Terri Farley, best-selling author of Seven Tears into the Sea and The Phantom Stallion series
- Blair Imani, author and activist
- John Leguizamo, actor, stand-up comedian, playwright, producer and screenwriter (endorsed Andrew Yang after Castro withdrew from the race)
- Maya Rupert, political strategist, writer, and advocate

=== Bill de Blasio ===
List of Bill de Blasio endorsements before withdrawal

State legislators

- Rodneyse Bichotte, New York assemblywoman from District 42 since 2015
- Luis Sepúlveda, New York state senator from District 32 (2017–present) (endorsed Bernie Sanders after de Blasio suspended his campaign)

Local officials

- Michael C. Butler, mayor of Orangeburg, South Carolina since 2013

Party officials

- Lachlan McIntosh, former executive director of the South Carolina Democratic Party (2005–2007)

Individuals

- Steve Buscemi, actor

=== John Delaney ===
List of John Delaney endorsements before withdrawal

U.S. representatives

- Brad Ashford, former U.S. representative from NE-02 (2015–2017)
- Richard L. Hanna, former U.S. representative from NY-22 (2011–2017) (Republican) (deceased after Delaney dropped out, but before the end of primaries)
- David Trone, U.S. representative from MD-6 since 2019
- Juan Vargas, U.S. representative from CA-51 since 2013

State legislators

- Jerry Stringham, New Hampshire state representative from Grafton District 5 since 2018
- Stephen Woodcock, New Hampshire state representative from Carroll District 2 since 2018

Local officials

- Henry Marquard, former 2020 Muscatine county supervisor candidate; former Iowa Environmental Commission chair (2008–2009)

=== Tulsi Gabbard ===
List of Tulsi Gabbard endorsements

U.S. senators

- Mike Gravel, former U.S. senator from Alaska (1969–1981); Democratic candidate for president in 2008 and 2020 (co-endorsement with Bernie Sanders)

U.S. representatives

- Dennis Kucinich, former representative from Ohio (1997–2013)
- Ron Paul, former representative from Texas (only in primary) (1976–77; 1979–1985; 1997–2013) (Libertarian)

Governors

- Gary Johnson, former Republican governor of New Mexico; Libertarian nominee for president in 2012 and 2016 (co-endorsement with Bill Weld) (Libertarian)

State legislators

- Blake Filippi, Rhode Island state representative from District 36 since 2014 (Republican)
- Mike Gabbard, Hawaii state senator from District 20 since 2006; Republican nominee for U.S. representative from HI-02 in 2004; Gabbard's father
- Kris Roberts, former New Hampshire state representative from Cheshire District 4; Keene Board of Education member; former Keene City Council member

Local officials

- Bill Paparian, former mayor of Pasadena, California (1995–97)

International politicians

- Tuilaepa Aiono Sailele Malielegaoi, prime minister of Samoa (1998–2021) (HRPP)

Individuals

- Charlotte Laws, author, TV host
- Sean Ono Lennon, musician
- Omeed Malik, banker
- Krish Mohan, actor, stand-up comedian
- Dave Navarro, singer (previously endorsed Marianne Williamson)
- Joe Rogan, stand-up comedian, host of the popular podcast The Joe Rogan Experience
- Esperanza Spalding, singer

Organizations

- Our Revolution Broward County (co-endorsement with Bernie Sanders)

=== Kirsten Gillibrand ===
List of Kirsten Gillibrand endorsements before withdrawal

U.S. representatives

- Carolyn Maloney, U.S. representative from NY-12 since 1993

State legislators

- Susan M. Ford, New Hampshire state representative from Grafton District 3 since 2012 (endorsed Elizabeth Warren after Gillibrand withdrew from the race)
- Judy Reardon, former New Hampshire state representative for the Hillsborough 37 District (1984–1988)

Party officials

- Laurie McCray, chair of the Portsmouth, New Hampshire Democratic Committee

Individuals

- Connie Britton, actress

=== Mike Gravel ===
List of Mike Gravel endorsements before withdrawal

Individuals

- Muntadhar al-Zaidi, Iraqi journalist responsible for the 2008 Bush shoeing incident

=== John Hickenlooper ===
List of John Hickenlooper endorsements before withdrawal

State legislators

- Rhonda Fields, Colorado state senator from District 29 since 2017
- Lucía Guzmán, former Colorado state senator from District 34 (2010–2019)

=== Jay Inslee ===
List of Jay Inslee endorsements before withdrawal

U.S. representatives

- Rick Larsen, U.S. representative from WA-02 since 2001

Governors

- Ted Strickland, former governor of Ohio (2007–2011); former U.S. representative from OH-06 (1993–1995 and 1997–2007); Democratic nominee for U.S. Senate in 2016 (endorsed Joe Biden after Inslee withdrew from the race)

State officials

- Bob Ferguson, attorney general of Washington since 2013

Local officials

- Dow Constantine, executive of King County, Washington since 2009
- Marilyn Strickland, former mayor of Tacoma, Washington (2010–2018)

Individuals

- Bill Nye, science communicator, television presenter, and mechanical engineer

Newspapers

- The Seattle Times

=== Seth Moulton ===
List of Seth Moulton endorsements before withdrawal

Individuals

- Marie Harf, political commentator and former acting spokesperson and deputy spokesperson at the U.S. State Department
- Stanley A. McChrystal, former commander of the International Security Assistance Force (2009–2010); retired U.S. Army four-star general

=== Richard Ojeda ===
List of Richard Ojeda endorsements before withdrawal

Individuals

- Krystal Ball, journalist and news anchor; Democratic nominee for U.S. representative from VA-01 in 2010

=== Beto O'Rourke ===
List of Beto O'Rourke endorsements before withdrawal

U.S. executive branch officials

- Louis Susman, former U.S. ambassador to the United Kingdom (2009–2013)

U.S. representatives

- Salud Carbajal, U.S. representative from CA-24 (2017–present) (endorsed Kamala Harris after O'Rourke withdrew from the race)
- Veronica Escobar, U.S. representative from TX-16 since 2019 (endorsed Joe Biden after O'Rourke withdrew from the race)
- Sean Patrick Maloney, U.S. representative from NY-18 since 2013 (endorsed Joe Biden after O'Rourke withdrew from the race)
- Stephanie Murphy, U.S. representative from FL-07 since 2017 (endorsed Michael Bloomberg after O'Rourke withdrew from the race)
- Kathleen Rice, U.S. representative from NY-04 since 2015 (endorsed Pete Buttigieg after O'Rourke withdrew from the race)

Governors

- Neil Abercrombie, former governor of Hawaii (2010–2014); former U.S. representative from HI-01 (1986–1987 and 1991–2010)
- Martin O'Malley, former governor of Maryland (2007–2015); former mayor of Baltimore (1999–2007); candidate for president in 2016

State officials

- Joan Bolin Betts, former deputy treasurer of Iowa and former assistant attorney general of Iowa (endorsed Michael Bennet after O'Rourke withdrew from the race)

State legislators

- Alma Allen, Texas state representative from District 131
- César Blanco, Texas state representative from District 76 since 2015 (endorsed Julian Castro after O'Rourke withdrew from the race)
- Boyd Brown, former South Carolina state representative from District 41 (2008–2012)
- Jessica Farrar, former Texas state representative from District 148 (1995–2019) (endorsed Julian Castro after O'Rourke withdrew from the race)
- Art Fierro, Texas state representative from District 79 since 2019 (endorsed Julian Castro after O'Rourke withdrew from the race)
- Chris Hall, Iowa state representative from District 13 since 2013 (endorsed Amy Klobuchar after O'Rourke withdrew from the race)
- Abel Herrero, Texas state representative from District 34 (endorsed Julian Castro after O'Rourke withdrew from the race)
- Gina Hinojosa, Texas state representative from District 49 since 2017
- Oscar Longoria, Texas state representative from District 35 (endorsed Julian Castro after O'Rourke withdrew from the race)
- Thomas McElveen, South Carolina state senator from District 35 since 2013
- Brian Meyer, Iowa state representative from District 33 since 2013 (endorsed Pete Buttigieg after O'Rourke withdrew from the race)
- Kate Miller, former New Hampshire state representative from Belknap's 3rd district (2008–2010)
- Joe Moody, Texas state representative from District 78, House Speaker Pro Tempore (endorsed Julian Castro after O'Rourke withdrew from the race)
- Lina Ortega, Texas state representative from District 77
- Marvin Pendarvis, South Carolina state representative for District 113 since 2017 (endorsed Joe Biden after O'Rourke withdrew from the race)
- Ana-Maria Ramos, Texas state representative from District 102 since 2019 (endorsed Julian Castro after O'Rourke withdrew from the race)
- José R. Rodríguez, Texas State Senate Minority Leader representing Senate District 29 (endorsed Julian Castro after O'Rourke withdrew from the race)
- Eliot Shapleigh, former Texas state senator
- Nate Willems, former Iowa state representative from District 29 (2009–2013) (endorsed Cory Booker after O'Rourke withdrew from the race)
- Gene Wu, Texas state representative from District 137 since 2013 (endorsed Julian Castro after O'Rourke withdrew from the race)

Municipal officials

- Peggy Sherrets, mayor of Oelwein, Iowa since 2014 (endorsed Pete Buttigieg after O'Rourke withdrew from the race)

Party officials

- Jen O'Malley Dillon, former chair of the DNC's Unity Reform Commission (2017–2018); former Executive Director of the DNC (2009–2010); deputy campaign manager for the Barack Obama 2012 presidential campaign; battleground states director for the Barack Obama 2008 presidential campaign (2008); manager of O'Rourke's campaign
- Norm Sterzenbach, former executive director of the Iowa Democratic Party (2006–2013); director of Beto O'Rourke's 2020 campaign in Iowa (2019) (endorsed Amy Klobuchar after O'Rourke withdrew from the race)

=== Deval Patrick ===
List of Deval Patrick endorsements

State legislators

- Dan Hunt, Massachusetts state representative from Suffolk District 13 since 2014
- David H. Watters, New Hampshire state senator from District 4 since 2012; former New Hampshire state representative from Stafford District 4 (2008–2012) (previously endorsed Cory Booker)

=== Tim Ryan ===
List of Tim Ryan endorsements before withdrawal

State legislators

- Fletcher Smith, former South Carolina state representative for District 23 (2004–2008)

Local officials

- Dan Horrigan, mayor of Akron, Ohio (2016–present)

=== Tom Steyer ===
List of Tom Steyer endorsements

State officials

- Dudley Dudley, former New Hampshire Executive Council member from District 3 (1977–1985)

State legislators

- Gilda Cobb-Hunter, South Carolina state representative for District 66 since 1992; DNC member
- Ed Fallon, former Iowa state representative for District 66 (1993–2006)
- Jerry Govan Jr., South Carolina state representative from District 95, 1992–2022
- Charles Isenhart, Iowa state representative for District 27 since 2008
- Harold Mitchell Jr., former South Carolina state representative from District 31 (2005–2017)
- Russell Ott, South Carolina state representative from District 93 since 2013
- Leola C. Robinson-Simpson, South Carolina state representative from District 25 2013–2022 (previously endorsed Cory Booker)
- John L. Scott Jr., South Carolina state senator from District 19 from 2009 until his death in 2023; former South Carolina state representative from District 77 (1991–2009) (previously endorsed Kamala Harris)
- Roger Thomas, former Iowa state representative from District 55 (1997–2001, 2003–2015)
- Shedron Williams, South Carolina state representative from District 122, 2018–2022

Individuals

- MC Lyte, rapper

=== Eric Swalwell ===
List of Eric Swalwell endorsements before withdrawal

U.S. representatives

- Ruben Gallego, U.S. representative from AZ-07 since 2015 and Swalwell campaign chair (endorsed Kamala Harris after Swalwell withdrew from the race)

Local officials

- Nancy O'Malley, Alameda County, California district attorney

Party officials

- Vikki Brown, Black Hawk County, Iowa Democratic Party chair since 2017 and chair of Swalwell's Iowa campaign

Organizations

- Tri-Valley Democratic Club

=== Marianne Williamson ===
List of Marianne Williamson endorsements before withdrawal

U.S. representatives

- Paul Hodes, former U.S. representative for New Hampshire's 2nd congressional district (2007–2011) and nominee for U.S. Senate in 2010 (endorsed Joe Biden after Williamson withdrew from the race)

State legislators

- Jill Carter, Maryland state senator from the 41st district (2018–present)
- Gloria Bromell Tinubu, former Georgia state representative from District 60 (2011–2013), candidate for lieutenant governor of South Carolina in 2018, nominee for SC-07 in 2012 and 2014, and candidate for mayor of Atlanta in 1997 and 2001

Individuals

- Margareta Arvidsson, actress, model, and Miss Universe 1966
- Deepak Chopra, physician and spiritual author
- Laura Dern, actress, filmmaker
- Frances Fisher, actress
- Dave Navarro, musician and actor (endorsed Tulsi Gabbard after Williamson withdrew from the race)

== See also ==
- News media endorsements in the 2020 United States presidential primaries
- List of 2020 Democratic Party automatic delegates
