= Vijen Patel (entrepreneur) =

American entrepreneur and investor

- Born: July 2, 1986 (age 40); Chicago metropolitan area, U.S.
- Education: University of Notre Dame (B.A. in Finance and Mathematics)
- Occupations: Entrepreneur, venture capitalist
- Known for: Pressbox (Co-founder and former CEO)

Vijen Patel (born July 2, 1986) is an American entrepreneur and venture capitalist. He is a founding partner at The 81 Collection, and co-founder of Pressbox, an on-demand laundry and dry cleaning company acquired by Procter & Gamble in 2018 and rebranded as Tide Cleaners.

== Early life and education ==
Patel was born in the Chicago metropolitan area. He attended Barrington High School, where he operated a small business reselling Chicago Cubs tickets on eBay. He earned bachelor's degrees in finance and mathematics from the University of Notre Dame in 2008.

== Career ==
Patel began his career at Goldman Sachs in 2007. In 2008, he joined McKinsey & Company as a business analyst, and in 2011, he became an associate at the private equity firm Friedman Fleischer & Lowe.

In 2013, Patel co-founded Pressbox with Drew McKenna in Chicago, Illinois. The company offered laundry and dry cleaning services through self-service lockers installed in residential and commercial buildings, with orders managed through a mobile application. Pressbox expanded to several U.S. cities before being acquired by Procter & Gamble in 2018 for an undisclosed amount. Following the acquisition, the company was integrated into P&G's Tide Cleaners division. Patel served as its CEO until 2020, when he moved to an advisory role.

In 2021, Patel founded The 81 Collection, a venture capital and growth equity firm headquartered in Chicago and New York. The firm invests in early-stage technology companies in industries such as manufacturing, logistics, construction, infrastructure, and real estate. Its first fund, launched in 2022, raised $41 million, with investors including DNS Capital, the investment office of the Pritzker family, along with over 100 business founders and executives across the United States.

Patel is a member of the U.S. Soccer Federation’s Chicago Development Council, which supports local soccer initiatives. He has served on the Chicago Board of Directors for Peer Health Exchange, a nonprofit organization focused on health education for young people.

== Views and commentary ==
Patel has commented on venture capital investment trends, highlighting what he views as a funding gap in traditional or “hard” industries such as manufacturing and logistics. He discussed these views during interviews, including an appearance on Bootstrapping in America in 2022. He has been a speaker at events including the Illinois Growth & Innovation Fund Summit and the Mid-Market Summit hosted by Kiser Group.
