= Murder of Jennifer Ann Crecente =

2006 murder in Austin, Texas

Jennifer Ann Crecente
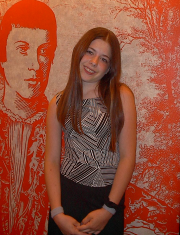
- Born: September 9, 1987; Las Cruces, New Mexico
- Died: February 15, 2006 (age 18); Austin, Texas
- Cause of death: Murder by shooting
- Education: Bowie High School
- Parent(s): Drew and Elizabeth Crecente
- Website: Jennifer Ann's Group

Jennifer Ann Crecente (September 9, 1987 – February 15, 2006) was an 18-year-old high school student who was shot and killed in southwest Austin, Texas, by Justin Crabbe, her ex-boyfriend, on February 15, 2006. Crecente's murder was the first in Austin in 2006. In response to her murder, two charitable organizations have been formed, a memorial grant created in her name, and legislation passed in Texas to prevent teen dating violence.

== Victim ==
Jennifer Ann Crecente was born in 1987 in Las Cruces, New Mexico. Her family moved to Austin, where she attended local schools, including high school. Among her classmates at Bowie High School in Austin was Justin Crabbe, until he dropped out of school in the tenth grade.

Jennifer was a camp counselor at SciTrek in Atlanta and hospital volunteer in Austin. Her grandmother was a psychologist and it was a field Jennifer was considering for study.

Crabbe was Crecente's ex-boyfriend when he killed her a few months prior to graduation.

== Murder ==
Jennifer Ann Crecente's body was found at night on February 16, 2006, in a wooded area in Austin. Justin Crabbe, her ex-boyfriend, was arrested on February 18, 2006, on a charge of first-degree murder. Crabbe told police that he and a man named Richard were playing with a gun. Jennifer was about 20 to 30 feet away. The gun fired, and Jennifer fell to the ground. Crabbe did not check on Crecente to see how badly she was injured before fleeing the scene. In the affidavit, which describes reasons for an arrest, Crabbe first told police that he and Crecente, who were dating, had had an argument earlier in the week while staying at a South Austin hotel. A videotape showed Crabbe with another man purchasing ammunition at a sporting goods store. Crabbe was on parole from a prior felony conviction and could not legally purchase ammunition himself.

=== Arrest and trial ===
Crabbe pleaded "not guilty" on September 22, 2006. Bail was denied. He faced a maximum sentence of life in prison. On March 6, 2007, Crabbe's court-appointed lawyers moved to have his videotaped confession thrown out, which was denied on March 22. Judge Baird set the trial date for July 23, 2007. On July 19, 2007, it was announced that there would be no trial for Crabbe but a court appearance had been scheduled for July 27, 2007. The court appearance was cancelled without explanation.

On July 31, 2007, it was announced that Crabbe had agreed to a guilty plea and that a hearing was scheduled for August 1, 2007. The terms were not released. On August 1, 2007, Crabbe pleaded guilty to murder as part of a plea agreement. He was sentenced to 35 years in prison. Additionally, he testified before a grand jury. Crabbe's testimony resulted in a sealed indictment for Ricardo Roman. Roman was indicted on July 17, 2007, and arrested on July 31, 2007, in South Texas. On February 15, 2008, the Travis County District Attorney's office dismissed the indictment against Roman after Crabbe reneged on his agreement to testify against Roman as part of his plea agreement.

== Impact ==
The Texas Psychological Foundation created The Jennifer Ann Crecente Memorial Grant in Crecente's memory. The annual grant pays $5,000 to a graduate student studying violence against women.

The Colquitt County Arts Center Theatre dedicated the 2007 production of Oliver! to Jennifer Ann Crecente. In 1998, the Arts Center had performed Oliver!, and Jennifer and her father had both appeared in the production. The 2007 production is dedicated to Crecente because of her performance; in addition, the show includes a theme of dating violence.

=== Charitable organizations ===
Day of the Dead altar

Both parents have founded organizations in Jennifer's honor. Organizational goals for the two organizations sometimes converge but work as individual entities:

Jennifer Ann's Group, a 501(c)(3) non-profit organization, was created by Jennifer's father Drew in February 2006 in Crecente's memory to prevent teen dating violence. The stated purpose of the organization is to "keep Jennifer Crecente's memory alive through education and good works." The organization distributes educational materials to schools and organizations across the US for free and has speakers for national and regional events to talk about teen dating violence. It is also the creator of the Gaming Against Violence program, which runs the Life.Love. Game Design Challenge, an annual video game design contest intended to educate teens and preteens about teen dating violence and to "support and foster protective factors against violence" and "improve the lives of young people around the world" through intentionally designed prosocial video games.

Jennifer's Hope was founded in August 2006 by Jennifer's mother, Elizabeth Crecente. She speaks to teens and professionals, has had several statewide and national appearances, and is involved in the Austin/Travis county community drives to prevent teen dating violence and promote healthy relationships.

=== Legislation ===
==== Teen dating violence prevention legislation ====
On February 5, 2007, the Texas Legislature's State Representative Dawnna Dukes entered a bill to require school districts in Texas to create policies regarding teen dating violence. This bill was created in memory of Jennifer Ann Crecente and Ortralla Mosley. Jennifer Ann's Group provided testimony on February 8, 2007, to the legislature in support of this bill. Governor Rick Perry signed the bill into law on May 18, 2007, and it immediately went into effect. Every school district in the state of Texas has to have a formal policy regarding Teen Dating Violence as a result of this legislation.

==== Posthumous diploma legislation ====
On February 15, 2007, on the one-year anniversary of Crecente's murder, Senator Eliot Shapleigh entered a bill to grant posthumous diplomas to students who died during their senior year of high school. The bill is named "Jennifer's Law". On May 28, 2007, the bill was signed in the Senate and passed to Governor Rick Perry for signing. The bill was signed by the Governor on June 15, 2007, and went into effect immediately. "Jennifer's Law" allows the family of any Texas student who died during their senior year of high school to request a posthumous diploma.

== Chatbot on Character.ai ==
A chatbot was created on AI companion platform Character.ai using Jennifer's name and photograph without the permission of her family. On October 2, 2024, Jennifer's father received a Google alert indicating that new content had been found online using the name of his deceased daughter. After contacting Character.AI to remove the chatbot he also alerted his brother, Brian Crecente, to this online character.

Brian posted about this chatbot character online, saying "... @character_ai is using my murdered niece ... without her dad’s permission ... He is very upset right now. I can’t imagine what he’s going through. Please help us stop this sort of terrible practice.” A spokesperson for Character.AI confirmed that the AI character based on Jennifer was subsequently removed by the company.
