= Jennifer Ann's Group =

Public charity in Atlanta, Georgia, US

The Jennifer Ann Crecente Memorial Group, Inc., commonly known as "Jennifer Ann's Group", is a Code Section 501(c)(3) public charity based in Atlanta, Georgia, whose aims are to educate young people about the prevalence of teen dating violence, how to identify these relationships, and how to extricate themselves safely from such relationships.

== History ==
The Jennifer Ann Crecente Memorial Group, Inc. received its corporate charter in the U.S. state of Georgia on June 23, 2006, and its 501(c)(3) status from the IRS on September 26, 2006. The stated goals of the organization are "[t]o keep Jennifer Crecente's memory alive through good works and by fighting Teen Dating Violence." The organization's trade name is Jennifer Ann's Group and is named in memory of Jennifer Ann Crecente. The group was founded by Crecente's father after the murder of the 18-year-old high school honors student by her ex-boyfriend.

== Gaming Against Violence ==
The charity focuses on preventing teen dating violence through awareness, education, and advocacy. Although the group has several programs, the program for which it is best known is Gaming Against Violence, a program which produces and publishes video games designed to prevent teen dating violence.

=== History of Gaming Against Violence ===
Since 2008 the organization has sponsored an annual game design competition, the Life.Love. Game Design Challenge, asking game developers "Can you create a video game about teen dating violence ... without using violence in the game itself?"

The winning video games are published and promoted to encourage students, parents, and teachers to learn about how to recognize and avoid abusive dating relationships. The winning video games represent a wide range of countries, with winning games coming from Argentina, Belgium, Canada, England, India, Ireland, Mexico, Sweden, Thailand, and the U.S.

=== Presentations ===
Jennifer Ann's Group's efforts to use video games to prevent teen dating violence has been presented to many groups including Games for Health conferences in Boston and Amsterdam, mHealth conferences, Game Developers Conference (GDC), SIEGE, and to the CDC.

=== Journal Publication ===
The Games for Health Journal printed a Program Profile about the program: "Gaming Against Violence: A Grassroots Approach to Teen Dating Violence" in 2014.

=== Recognition ===
Recognized as a Top 10 Trailblazer by Break the Cycle for "innovative use of video games" to stop teen dating violence. Its video game 'Rispek Danis' was recognized as a Finalist for Most Significant Impact by the 2019 Games for Change Awards. Two video games produced by Jennifer Ann's Group and published in 2021, 'Culture Overlord' and 'Sea of Roses', were each finalists for the 2021 James Paul Gee Learning Games Award.

=== Video games ===
Rispek Danis (the Respect Dance), a "culturally appropriate and enjoyable game about consent created for youth in Vanuatu" is a finalist for 'Most Significant Impact' at the 2019 Games for Change Awards. The game is in Bislama and the game's dialogue, settings, characters, and music reflect ni-Vanuatu life. Rispek Danis is available to play online or for Android devices from Google Play. An English-language version is only available to play online. Rispek Danis was developed through a collaboration between World Vision Vanuatu and Jennifer Ann's Group to "teach young people about the meaning and importance of consent" as part of the "It Takes a World Campaign" from World Vision International.

ADRIFT, a serious game about consent developed by Quinn Crossley and Andrew Connell for Jennifer Ann's Group is part of the 2019 "Hedonism" exhibition at MOD. at the University of South Australia which features a life-size video game called F.A.B.L.E. (the Federated Association of Believers, Leaders, and Explorers) that is based on ADRIFT.

More of the winning video games from the organization's annual design competition are published online and/or for download to smartphones and tablets. A selection of the video games include: Grace's Diary, a game about dating violence and bystander awareness from 2010 developed by GPTouch; Love in the Dumpster, a game about teen dating violence and its impact on all genders from 2013 developed by AnotherKind; The Guardian, a game about abusive relationships and its impact on different age groups and genders from 2014 developed by 99UNO; Another Chance, a "cute, sprite-based game" with "interesting mechanics and, yes, got a bit preachy" that "for a brief, razor-sharp moment I was confronted with a real issue in the world today: Teen Dating Violence" from 2015 developed by AnotherKind; HONEYMOON, a game about healthy relationships from 2016 developed by SNDR; Stuck in a Dark Place, a serious game about consent that "addresses many consent scenarios including sexual assault and rape" from 2017 developed by AnotherKind; Citizen Witch, a game about bystander intervention from 2018 developed by Lucas Vially; and Step Up, a game about bystander intervention from 2018 developed by Jc Games.

The games are available through various app stores including App Store (iOS), Google Play, Amazon App Store, Blackberry World, and Amazon Alexa skills marketplace. The organization's game portal JAGga.me features a rotating selection of the video games as does its page on itch.io. All games for online play and for download are free.

=== Media Coverage ===
The Gaming Against Violence program and Jennifer Ann's Group's use of video games has been covered by a range of gaming and mainstream media outlets including Wired, Huffington Post, Kotaku, Fast Co.Exist, Polygon, Gamasutra, GamePolitics.com, and NPR.

== Efforts: Other Programs ==
=== Legislation ===
- On November 16, 2006, a member of the Jennifer Ann's Group's advisory group, Dr. Elizabeth Richeson, used Jennifer Ann's Group as an example of a group that is attempting to educate others about the prevalence of teen dating violence at the Texas Psychological Association's convention about their "Stand Against Violence" campaign. On November 23, 2006, Dr. Richeson discussed the group's efforts to educate others about how common violence is in teenage relationships in an interview with El Paso, Texas NBC affiliate KTSM.
- On February 13, 2007, the charity provided testimony to the Texas House in support of new legislation proposed to require school districts in Texas to adopt policies regarding teen dating violence. On May 18, 2007, the Dating Violence Policy Bill was signed into law in Texas and became effective immediately.
- The charity has successfully lobbied with Texas state politicians Senator Eliot Shapleigh and Representative Valinda Bolton to have a bill, "Jennifer's Law" entered into legislation in Texas to award posthumous diplomas to high school seniors that have died during their senior year. The bill was entered on February 15, 2007, the one-year anniversary of Jennifer Ann Crecente's murder. The legislation passed both the Senate and the House and was sent to Governor Rick Perry for signing. The law went into effect upon signing by the Governor on June 15, 2007.

=== Partnerships ===
- On February 8, 2007, the charity announced a partnership with the Loveisrespect National Teen Dating Abuse Helpline to promote their helpline on the Educational Cards that the charity distributes. The charity purchased 10,000 Educational Cards that will be distributed to the Education, Health Care and Government sectors.
- In 2024, the charity partnered with Emory University for an NIH-funded R25 study titled Project TIDAL. The objective of the study is to develop a course titled “Trauma-Informed Data Science and Digital Health Technologies to Prevent Intimate Partner Violence (IPV) among Pregnant/Postpartum Women” targeting early-career researchers in the field of nursing. The executive director of Jennifer Ann's Group is on the faculty of this project. He will be teaching participants about digital health games and how they can be used to prevent IPV.

=== Educational Resources ===
- On September 28, 2007, the charity received their order of 100,000 Educational Cards to educate teens about the dangers of teen dating violence. These free cards are given to organizations throughout the United States. The educational cards have the same form factor as credit cards - and are made from the same material. The idea behind the cards was to provide this information to young people in a format that would "endure scrutiny as well as the lifestyles of young people."
- On January 31, 2009, the charity announced that it had distributed over 250,000 Educational Cards to schools and other organizations across the United States in support of its efforts to increase awareness about teen dating violence.
- In 2009 the group began distributing educational bookmarks. The bookmarks contain the same safety information and warning signs as the cards but also includes other helpful information intended to encourage students to retain the bookmarks for future reference.
- As of 2016 the organization had distributed over 500,000 of their resources to "schools, churches, and other organizations at no cost to them."

=== Fundraisers ===
- The first annual fundraiser, held April 21, 2007 in El Paso, Texas was supported by many organizations. Video gaming blog Kotaku offered several video gaming packages for bid through eBay with all proceeds going to the charity.
- In 2008 the fundraiser moved to the Fall and was held September 13, 2008 in El Paso.
- From 2009 through 2024, the fundraiser was held in October in El Paso.
