= Brian Crecente =

American journalist (born 1970)

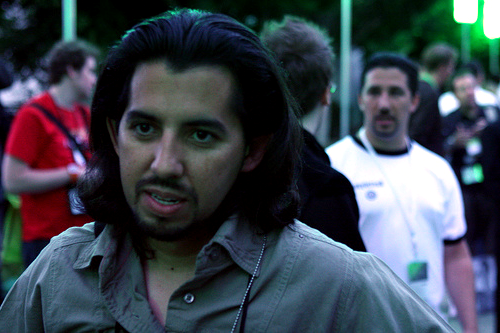
- Crecente at the 2007 Electronic Entertainment Expo
- Born: July 28, 1970 (age 56); United States
- Education: University of Maryland, College Park
- Occupations: Journalist, editor, columnist

Brian Crecente (born July 28, 1970) is an American journalist and columnist. He founded Kotaku, co-founded Polygon, previously served as video games editor at Variety, and was in charge of game coverage at Rolling Stone.

== Career ==
He began his career as a journalist with the Fort Worth Star-Telegram in 1997, following a year-long stint with the Capital Cities/ABC Newspaper Fellowship Program. He went on to work for the Palm Beach Post and then the Rocky Mountain News, where he covered crime and public safety for a total of 12 years.

He started his career as a video game journalist as the founding editor-in-chief of Kotaku, launched in 2004. Starting in 2009, he wrote Good Game, a weekly column internationally syndicated by McClatchy-Tribune Information Services.

Crecente left Kotaku in 2012, after building up the site from 10,000 pageviews a month to 10 million. He went on to help found Polygon, launched in 2012, where he would later become executive editor.

In July 2017, Crecente announced on Twitter that he would be leaving Polygon for Rolling Stone's gaming website Glixel. He was brought on at Variety on April 9, 2018, to expand the entertainment publication's coverage into video gaming with a new vertical that the co-editors say "represents another step forward in our effort to offer great journalism regarding every aspect of the modern media landscape." At the time he was still contributing to Rolling Stone's game coverage. Rolling Stone's gaming vertical, Glixel, was shut down later in 2018.

Crecente was laid off from Variety in June 2019, and the gaming section was removed from the Variety masthead. In 2019, Crecente launched his company Pad & Pixel. In 2020, his company helped launch an official Lego Games podcast for the Lego Group entitled Bits N' Bricks to help celebrate the 25-year history of the first Lego video game. He co-hosted the weekly show, which is hosted on lego.com. Also in 2020, he brought back his syndicated column, now named Game, launching it on Substack. It currently has about 6,500 subscribers. In 2021, Crecente helped launch an official Level Infinite podcast for Tencent Games entitled This is Level Infinite. It explored the creation of the company's games. He co-hosted the weekly show which is hosted on LevelInfinite.com.

In 2024, his company helped launch a new gaming News section for Epic Games Store, for which he is the executive editor.

== Recognition ==
In 2025, Crecente was accepted to BAFTA in recognition of his "contribution to our industry."

In 2018, Crecente received a special recognition from the Society of Professional Journalists for his series on game culture in Cuba. He was also awarded first place for Excellence in eSports Writing that same year by the SPJ for his story on the esports champions of Cuba. Crecente was named one of the 20 most influential people in the video game industry over the past 20 years by GamePro in 2009 and one of gaming's Top 50 journalists by Edge in 2006. He was featured in a 5280 biography.

As a police reporter at the Rocky Mountain News, Crecente received an Associated Press Sports Editors Award for his work on the story "Drinking, sex rampant at party attended by CU football prospects" in 2004. He also received Excellence in Journalism Awards from the Colorado Chapter of the Society of Professional Journalists for stories on gang violence, a plane crash, wildfires, and police-involved shootings. He was honored by the Associated Press Sports Editors Best Writing for a feature story for his work on the death of Bioson Dele. As a reporter at the Palm Beach Post he was part of a team honored by the Florida Press Club for the paper's coverage of the 2000 Presidential Election recount. He also received several awards as a police reporter at the Fort Worth Star-Telegram.

== Personal life ==
Brian Crecente is married and has a son and two grandchildren. He is the uncle of Jennifer Ann Crecente, who was murdered in 2006. He was one of the judges on the "Life. Love. Game Design Challenge", a competition designed "to challenge video game designers and developers to create video games about teen dating violence" sponsored by Jennifer Ann's Group, a memorial charity for Jennifer. Crecente attended the University of Maryland, College Park.

== Works ==
- Good Game, Well Played (collection of his Kotaku and Polygon columns)
- A Handheld History
- Supercade: A Visual History of the Videogame Age 1985-2001
