= Carol Alvarado =

American politician (born 1967)

- Alvarado in 2025

Minority Leader of the Texas Senate
- Incumbent
- Assumed office January 8, 2020
- Preceded by: José R. Rodríguez

Member of the Texas Senate from the 6th district
- Incumbent
- Assumed office December 21, 2018
- Preceded by: Sylvia Garcia

Member of the Texas House of Representatives from the 145th district
- In office January 13, 2009 – December 21, 2018
- Preceded by: Rick Noriega
- Succeeded by: Christina Morales

Member of Houston City Council from District I
- In office January 1, 2002 – January 1, 2008
- Preceded by: John Castillo
- Succeeded by: James Rodriguez

Personal details
- Born: October 26, 1967 (age 58) Houston, Texas, U.S.
- Party: Democratic
- Education: University of Houston (BA, MBA)
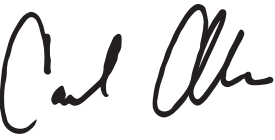
- Signature
- Website: Office website Campaign website

Carol Ann Alvarado (born October 26, 1967) is the state senator for Texas's 6th state senate district. The district includes southeast Houston, and portions of Pasadena. She is a member of the Democratic Party. On December 11, 2018, Alvarado won a special election to fill the Senate seat for the 6th district left vacant by the resignation of Sylvia Garcia, who was elected to the U.S. House of Representatives.

== Early life and education ==
Carol Alvarado is a native Houstonian and a longtime resident of Houston's East End. Her political activism began at the age of 12, when she assisted her godfather's campaign for the Houston City Council District I. Prior to formally entering public life, Alvarado worked in City Hall as a Senior Executive Assistant to Houston Mayor Lee P. Brown. Her past professional experience includes serving as a legislative assistant to Congressman Gene Green in Washington D.C., and as a consultant in economic and community development in East End neighborhoods.

Alvarado is a graduate of the University of Houston, and holds a Bachelor of Arts degree in political science. She received her MBA from the University of Houston in December 2008.

== Political career ==
=== City Council ===
Alvarado served on the Houston City Council, District I, from 2002 to 2007. During her time on the City Council, Alvarado worked to close down nuisance bars in neighborhoods, improve air quality, and secure cameras at problem rail crossings. She was instrumental in the creation of the Parking Commission, and led the effort to establish a deed restriction database. Alvarado also spearheaded the Houston city ordinance that bans smoking in public restaurants and bars.

=== State House ===
In 2008, Alvarado was elected to Texas House of Representatives. She currently resides as the co-chair of the Transparency in State Agency Operations committee, the vice-chair of the Urban Affairs committee, and as a member of the House Calendars and Special Purpose Districts committees.

Alvarado's primary legislative focus has been on public health, public education, and economic development issues. During her three terms in the House, she has authored bills to qualify all Texas four-year-olds for pre-kindergarten, to increase career and technology education funding, to limit elementary class sizes, and to freeze tuition at public colleges and universities. She has also authored legislation that would limit the use of sugary drinks in public schools, increase physical education and health education graduation requirements, and ban the use of trans fats by fast food chains.

An advocate of women's health issues, Alvarado received media attention in 2011 during the debate of House Bill 15, a mandatory sonogram bill. Speaking on the floor of the House chamber, Alvarado displayed a 10-inch trans vaginal wand and described the intrusiveness of the sonogram procedure.

=== State Senate ===
In 2021, Alvarado engaged in a 15-hour filibuster to prevent the Republican-controlled Texas Senate from passing legislation to restrict voting rights. Filibusters in Texas require continuous standing and speaking.

In 2025 Avarado attempted another filibuster to block a redistricting bill by the Republicans. But her attempt was blocked the reason stated being "she was violating Senate decorum". The new bill passed giving the Republicans up to 5 additional seats in congress in the upcoming 2026 elections.

Texas Senate
Preceded by José R. Rodríguez	Minority Leader of the Texas Senate; 2020–present	Incumbent
