= Naomi Gonzalez =

American politician (born 1978)

Naomi R. Gonzalez

Member of the Texas House of Representatives from the 76th district
- In office January 2011 – January 2015
- Preceded by: Norma Chávez
- Succeeded by: Cesar Blanco

Personal details
- Born: June 4, 1978 (age 48)
- Party: Democratic

Naomi R. Gonzalez (born June 4, 1978) is an American attorney and politician from El Paso, Texas. She was a Democratic member of the Texas House of Representatives from 2011 to 2015, where she represented the 76th district in El Paso County. She lost her race for re-election in 2014, defeated by Cesar Blanco in the Democratic primary.

== Early life and career ==
Gonzalez graduated from Jefferson High School in El Paso, before going to Our Lady of the Lake University in San Antonio and law school at St. Mary's University. On graduating from law school, she worked at El Paso law firms before joining the El Paso County Attorney's office in 2007 as an Assistant County Attorney.

== Political career ==
=== 2010 campaign for state representative ===
Gonzalez defeated seven-term incumbent Norma Chávez in the 2010 Democratic primary runoff to capture a seat in the Texas House, capitalizing on a series of high-profile controversies surrounding Chávez. Despite running against a long-time incumbent, Gonzalez's campaign received the support of numerous local political players, including the El Paso Times, state senator Eliot Shapleigh and other members of the county's legislative delegation. The race was highly negative and personal, with each candidate launching attacks against the other.

During the 2010 campaign, Chávez drew attention on several occasions to Gonzalez's sexual orientation, saying that her opponent was a lesbian. Gonzalez did not deny the charge but criticized Chávez's tactics and accused her of trying to run from her record.

In the Democratic primary election held on March 2, Gonzalez polled 48% of the vote to Chávez's 46%, with a minor candidate taking the remainder. Because no candidate won an absolute majority, a runoff election was held on April 13, 2010 with Gonzalez defeating Chávez by 53% to 47% – a margin of 361 votes. No Republican filed for the seat and Gonzalez won the general election unopposed. Gonzalez took the oath of office in January 2011.

=== 2014 re-election campaign ===
==== Driving while intoxicated arrest and charge ====
Close to 2 A.M. on March 14, 2013 Rep. Gonzalez was arrested and charged with DWI after her vehicle struck a car at the intersection of Congress Ave. and Barton Springs Rd. in Austin, Texas. Gonzalez's car was allegedly traveling at 50 mph, 20 miles over the speed limit, when it struck a vehicle and forced it into a collision with a bicyclist. Police state that Gonzalez's blood alcohol content was .164, over twice the legal limit. Gonzalez told police that she had only two drinks and cried while telling them that she had worked so hard to get where she is today. The following week she offered an emotional apology to her fellow House members telling them, "I made a mistake and I am deeply, deeply sorry for it" adding, "I am sorry for the shame I have brought upon this House and my district." She said that ongoing legal issues prevented her from saying much about the incident, but that she was glad no one was seriously injured.

Gonzalez lost her bid for re-election in 2014, coming third in the Democratic primary on March 4, 2014. She finished third with 27% of the vote, behind Cesar Blanco who took 44% of the vote and Norma Chavez, who took 29% of the vote. Blanco won the primary runoff and the general election, succeeding Gonzalez on the expiration of her term in January 2015.

In 2013 Texas Monthly named her one of the 10 worst legislators in the Texas legislature because of her 2013 drunk driving arrest, her actions on the scene of the arrest and her "bizarre" statement upon her return to the legislature.
