= Bits N' Bricks =

- Genre: Video games
- Language: English

Cast and voices
- Hosted by: Brian Crecente; Ethan Vincent

Production
- Production: Ronny Schere

Publication
- No. of seasons: 6
- No. of episodes: 55
- Original release: December 9, 2020 – June 13, 2023

Bits N' Bricks is an official podcast hosted by Brian Crecente and Ethan Vincent focusing on Lego video games. It was started in December 2020 during the 25th anniversary of Lego gaming and ran until 2023.
