= Norma Chávez =

American politician

Member of the Texas House of Representatives from the 76th district
- In office January 1997 – January 2011
- Preceded by: Nancy McDonald
- Succeeded by: Naomi Gonzalez

Personal details
- Born: June 29, 1960 (age 66) El Paso, Texas, U.S.
- Party: Democratic
- Relations: Norman Chávez (father), Connie Chávez (mother)
- Profession: Realtor

Norma Chávez (born 29 June 1960) served seven terms as a member of the Democratic Party in the Texas House of Representatives representing District 76 (which includes part of El Paso County). She was defeated for re-election by Naomi Gonzalez in the Democratic primary runoff held on April 13, 2010, and left office in January 2011.

In 2009, she opposed an El Paso county ethics bill, causing controversy. She also was featured on the Texas Monthly's "Dishonorable Mention" list because she engaged in a feud with state representative Marisa Marquez, to whom she texted, "U ridiculed my education every drunk opportunity u had. U R not my friend" after Marquez had allegedly ridiculed her while drunk at a lobbyist party. She held a $3,529 graduation party, well attended by Republican and Democratic lawmakers (featuring mariachis, a barbecue lunch and cake) paid for by lobbyists.

== Legislative career ==
During the 81st Legislature, Chávez initiated a bill to increase funding for the Skills Development Fund (SDF) job-training program and authored legislation subsequently signed into law that established reporting requirements for the investment portfolio of the Texas Emerging Technology Fund. She enacted legislation allowing the Texas Workforce Commission to commit SDF training grants as an incentive to attract out of state employers willing to commit to establishing a place of business in Texas. Additionally, she passed legislation that allowed for increased funding for school districts affected by Base Realignment and Closure and regulations directing a feasibility study for establishment of a law school in Texas' Border region.

In previous sessions, she passed legislation that will establish four new courts in El Paso County. Also, she passed legislation that expands the Public Safety Commission from 3 to 5 members. Chávez passed legislation that will let Texas compete with its neighboring states by allowing local communities to offer an exemption on goods-in-transit. She passed legislation to streamline administrative processes at the Health and Human Services Commission by requiring the commissioner to develop guidelines and standards to allow for the use of electronic signatures. Chávez passed legislation that will require the Texas Bond Review Board to comprehensively review the effect of new debt authorizations and appropriations on debt services on the state's future capacity.

As the only person from the El Paso Delegation to serve on a budget-writing committee this session, Rep. Chávez secured the $48 million needed to open the Texas Tech Medical School in El Paso. Additionally, she removed a bureaucratic and unnecessary contingency measure that would have required medical school officials to go before the state to ask for the remaining $18 million needed to open the school. She also allocated the $9 million needed to restore solvency to the Firefighters' Pension Fund. Rep. Chávez also secured the $1 million needed in debt service to issue $12 million in bonds for the Economically Distressed Areas Program (EDAP). EDAP helps communities build water and wastewater services.

Chávez passed legislation that increased funding for the Skills Development Fund, from $25 million to $40 million, over the next biennium. Since its inception in 1996, the Skills Development program has helped over 2,500 employers create almost 55,000 jobs and has retrained about 85,000 workers. Rep. Chávez also passed legislation to require local workforce development boards to include financial literacy education in worker retraining programs offered by the Texas Workforce Commission. She also passed legislation that improves the inspections of farm worker housing.

During 79th Legislature, Rep. Chávez along with Senator Eliot Shapleigh, Texas Civil Rights Project, ACLU, LULAC, MALDEF and many other organizations, stood up against and defeated legislation filed by a special interest group that would have disenfranchised over 75,000 voters from voting in El Paso County Water Improvement District No. 1 manager elections.

Rep. Chávez filed legislation and led the historical initiative in the Texas House of Representatives, declaring the first Texas holiday honoring a Latino, for civil rights activist and labor leader César Chávez. She also honored Cesar Chávez by passing legislation that designated Loop 375 as the César Chávez Border Highway. Rep. Chávez also filed and passed "the coyote bill" creating a state penalty for those individuals who use Texas highways, lands, and waterways to transport undocumented workers for a profit. She passed an amendment to the Texas Constitution which prohibits home equity lenders from redlining in Texas. Additionally, Rep. Chávez introduced and passed a floor amendment to protect farm workers' right to know when pesticides are used and passed legislation protecting temporary workers from discrimination. Her initiatives in the field of health care include the authoring and passage of legislation establishing the Border Health Institute, legislation creating the Texas Tech Diabetes Research Center as well as legislation creating the Border Telemedicine Pilot Project. She also passed legislation creating a NAFTA Impact Zone and providing technology training for workers displaced by NAFTA.

Rep. Chávez passed legislation that created the Center of Law and Border Studies at the University of Texas at El Paso and legislation that created El Paso County Criminal Courts at Law No. 1 and No. 2.

She passed historic legislation to expand the Texas Transportation Commission from 3 to 5 members, which increased border representation on transportation issues.

== Community service ==
Chávez has served on the Executive Committees of the Greater El Paso Chamber of Commerce and the Business Opportunities Council and is currently a member of both the El Paso Hispanic Chamber of Commerce and the Greater El Paso Chamber of Commerce.

In 1995, as a citizen, Chávez organized a citizen lobby, including 170 small businesses, legislative members, small and big business interests, and citizens, which aided in the passage of state legislation that decentralized automobile emissions testing.

By considering the health and environmental hazards, Chávez organized efforts to prevent nuclear waste from being disposed at Sierra Blanca.

A former public-action organizer for the United Farm Workers, Chávez has organized public support for a fair and just food supply and for issues affecting migrant farm workers. Chávez has received training by the Industrial Areas Foundation.

Chávez was a board member of Community Alliance Promoting Education Alternatives (CAPEA), an organization which seeks positive intervention and prevention in the lives of at-risk youth.

Chávez is a former board member of the Friends of the El Paso Museum of Art.

== 2009 lobbyist controversy ==
On July 16, 2009, the El Paso Times reported that Chávez had her staff request that 17 lobbyists pay for a $3,500 celebration for her earning a Bachelor of Arts degree. The event had a Longhorn ice sculpture, mariachis, a barbecue lunch and cake. Chávez preferred not to disclose anything in this regard.

One lobbyist, Claudia Russell who represented El Paso County, said she paid $150 to the party after Chávez's staff requested a contribution. "I don't know if I wanted to," Russell said. "I just kinda felt it was my duty to." On July 28, 2009, the El Paso Times published a letter by Russell that said, "Because these events are not unusual and because I attended the event, when asked, I mistakenly stated that I helped sponsor the event. After reviewing my records, I did not sponsor Rep. Chávez's graduation party. I confused it with an earlier event that I did help sponsor. I apologize for the mistake. But let me make one thing perfectly clear: I was not asked by Rep. Chávez's staff to contribute to the graduation party. Furthermore, I did not make a contribution." Chávez said she would not allow Russell into her office any more.

Russell said that she contributed to another of Chávez's parties, not the graduation party. Chávez claimed she was lying and wanted an apology. Chávez met with County Judge Anthony Cobos, County Commissioner Anna Perez and a top executive at Bickerstaff, Heath, Delgado, Acosta, the law firm that employs Russell. But the county's commissioners said a public apology was unnecessary and inappropriate. "This isn't about Claudia or the county," Perez said. "The story was about lobbyists paying for that party," County Commissioner Anna Perez said.

None of the lobbyists talked to the newspaper, and Chávez would not release their names.

Tom "Smithy" Smith, director of Public Citizen in Texas, told the paper: "She made a big darn deal out of it as one of the highlights of her life, so those that contributed are going to be on her good buddies' list."

Andrew Wheat, research director with the watchdog group Texans for Public Justice, told the paper, "It might have been far more in the public interest to scale back the size of the party … People graduate all the time without lobbyists paying for ice sculptures at their graduation parties."

== El Paso County ethics bill ==
An FBI investigation into corruption in El Paso County resulted in 10 elected officials, government and employees and businessmen pleading guilty to bribery and fraud. During the 2009 session, county officials pushed for legislation to establish a County ethics commission code to pursue and punish corruption violations. The ethics commission will have developed standards of conduct for county officials, employees, vendors, lobbyists and others who do business with the county.

Chávez did express her concerns regarding the legislation and made public her analysis of the legislation. Chávez identified at least 40 points of her concern ranging from the constitutionality of the commission, to the broad use or lack of definitions, conflicts of interest, among others.

The bill originally as drafted did not allow for review on a ruling by a District Court, or de novo review. The Texas Ethics Commission has adopted the standard de novo review.

Additionally, the bill establishes the County Attorney as the legal adviser to the proposed Ethics Commission. Currently, the County Attorney offers legal advice and counsel to elected officials and departments of the county. The County Attorney could find him or herself in a position where his client, the government official who asked for his advice and followed it, is facing charges from the County Attorney's other client the client, the Ethics Commission.

Some of the suggestions made by Chávez were ultimately incorporated in the final version of the bill.

Currently, El Paso County does have an Ethics Board.

Recently, concerns were expressed by a county official on the proposed Ethics Commission. El Paso County Commissioner Dan Haggerty said his fear was that the new commission would be used as a political weapon that could harm officials wrongly accused of unethical behavior. Such allegations, he said, usually make splashy headlines, but the news does not get much attention when accusations turn out to be false.

== 2006 incident with El Paso neighbors ==
In November 2006 Chávez's neighbors filed a police report saying that Chávez shouted profanity and threats at them, to have their dog taken away. The neighbors filed two police reports complaining that Chávez became enraged about their dog. Chávez told the media that her neighbors were lying and that she wasn't in El Paso at the time of the alleged events. No charges were filed against Chávez, and police said the complaints were not investigated.

== 2002 police incident ==
In December 2002, El Paso police closed a party, attended by Chávez, in her staffer's apartment, after neighbors complained of drug use in progress and noise. The police report was obtained by the El Paso Times on March 2, 2006. In the report, police reported Chávez was "highly intoxicated" and "abusive." The officers received a barrage and insults. No charges were filed against Chávez. A March 2, 2006 El Paso Times story detailed the report.

At the party, two men were arrested, a January 30, 2003 the El Paso Times reported. The charges against these two men were dismissed according to the March 2, 2006 El Paso Times story.

== Proposition 12 ==
In 2003, a constitutional amendment - Proposition 12 - that permitted caps on civil damage awards was put up to a vote. The amendment needed 100 votes. Republicans held 88 seats and uniformly supported the measure, and thus needed 12 Democrats to support the bill. Chávez told the Mexican American Caucus she would vote against the measure. But when the vote reached the floor, Chávez voted for the amendment. For this, Dolores Huerta, the former United Farmworkers activist who opposed the measure, said that Chávez "deserves to catch some heat in her district" for her vote

Voters in El Paso County passed Proposition 12 by 60% when it appeared on the ballot.

== Texas Monthly criticism ==
In a word: clueless. She doesn't know the first lesson of legislative survival: Lead, follow, or get out of the way. She can't lead, won't follow, and absolutely refuses to get out of the way. She set the tone for her career in 1997, her freshman year, by promising her vote to both candidates for the head of the Mexican American Caucus. You might think she'd learned something since then — even an amoeba picks up things by osmosis — but she continues to bumble her way through.

— Texas Monthly, Ten Worst Legislators, July 1999

For her petty session-long text-messaging feud with fellow El Pasoan Marisa Marquez over an ethics bill. ("U R on the Dishonorable Mention List!!!")

— Texas Monthly, Dishonorable Mention List, July 2009

== Campaign contributions ==
In 2006, Chávez's major contributor was Bob J. Perry, a Houston homebuilder and major contributor to conservative Republican 527 groups, including Swift Vets and POWs for Truth, the group that "swift boated" John Kerry in the 2004 presidential campaign.

Bob Perry has also donated to numerous other Texas Democrats, including: Senators Rodney Ellis, Leticia Van de Putte, Mario Gallegos, Judith Zaffirini and Juan Hinojosa; Representatives Alma Allen, Ellen Cohen, Sylvester Turner, Rick Noriega (former member), Debra Danburg (former member), Dawnna Dukes, Jessica Farrar, Jose Menendez, Allan Ritter, Ruth Jones McClendon, Michael Villarreal, Harold Dutton, Helen Giddings, David Farabee, Armando Martinez, among others.

== Texas Ethics Commission sanction ==
In 2006, the Texas Ethics Commission found credible evidence that she neglected to report $28,650.71 in political contributions. Her July 2005 report initially disclosed only $900 of political contributions. It was also found that she had failed to report all political contributions on four occasions. She was imposed a civil penalty fine for the same.

== Election history ==
=== 2008 ===
Texas General Election, 2008: House District 76
Party	Candidate	Votes	%	±%
Democratic	Norma Chávez	26,632	100.00	
Majority		26,632	100.00	
Turnout		26,632		
Democratic hold				

=== 2006 ===
Texas General Election, 2006: House District 76
Party	Candidate	Votes	%	±%
Democratic	Norma Chávez	12,886	100.00	
Majority		12,886	100.00	
Turnout		12,886		
Democratic hold				

Democratic primary, 2006: House District 76
Candidate		Votes	%	±
✓	Norma Chávez (Incumbent)	6,817	70.10	
	Martha "Marty" Reyes	2,907	29.89	
Turnout		9,724		

=== 2004 ===
Texas General Election, 2004: House District 76
Party	Candidate	Votes	%	±%
Democratic	Norma Chávez	25,010	100.00	
Majority		25,010	100.00	
Turnout		25,010		
Democratic hold				

=== 2002 ===
Texas General Election, 2002: House District 76
Party	Candidate	Votes	%	±%
Democratic	Norma Chávez	17,387	100.00	
Majority		17,387	100.00	
Turnout		17,387		
Democratic hold				

=== 2000 ===
Texas General Election, 2000: House District 76
Party	Candidate	Votes	%	±%
Democratic	Norma Chávez	22,335	100.00	
Majority		22,335	100.00	
Turnout		22,335		
Democratic hold				

=== 1998 ===
Texas General Election, 1998: House District 76
Party	Candidate	Votes	%	±%
Democratic	Norma Chávez	15,586	100.00	
Majority		15,586	100.00	
Turnout		15,586		
Democratic hold				

=== 1996 ===
Texas General Election, 1996: House District 76
Party	Candidate	Votes	%	±%
Democratic	Norma Chávez	22,848	100.00	
Majority		22,848	100.00	
Turnout		22,848		
Democratic hold				

Democratic primary runoff, 1996: House District 76
Candidate		Votes	%	±
✓	Norma Chávez	6,665	64.00	
	Ignacio "Nacho" Padilla	3,749	35.99	
Turnout		10,414		

Democratic primary, 1996: House District 76
Candidate	Votes	%	±
Angie Barajas	1,373	10.96	
James M. Callan	1,619	12.93	
Norma Chávez	4,899	39.12	
Ignacio "Nacho" Padilla	4,630	36.97	
Turnout	12,521		

Preceded by Nancy McDonald	Member of the Texas House of Representatives from District 76 (El Paso); 199-2011	Succeeded by Naomi Gonzalez
