= Nancy McDonald =

American politician

Nancy Jane McDonald (née Hanks; October 21, 1934 – May 14, 2007) was a Democratic member of the Texas House of Representatives from District 76, covering Ysleta and parts of El Paso in El Paso County.

A seven-term state representative from El Paso, McDonald first served in the 1984 special session that enacted major reforms relating to public education; she was elected to a full term in the fall of 1984 and continued to serve through 1998, when she declined to run again.

== Legislative history ==
The only registered nurse serving in the legislature when she first came to the Texas Capitol in Austin, McDonald played a key role in securing funding for health and human services programs, authored landmark child immunization legislation, and advocated for AIDS patients; her committee assignments included the vice chairmanship of the appropriations committee, longtime service on the public health committee, and service on the Ways and Means and the labor and employment relations committees.

== Death ==
McDonald died on May 14, 2007, aged 72, from ovarian cancer. Her husband Will died on August 28, 2007. Her third great-grandfather was the maternal uncle of Abraham Lincoln; confirmed via Find A Grave.

Preceded by n/a	Member of the Texas House of Representatives from District 76 (El Paso) {{{years}}}	Succeeded by Norma Chavez
