= Kate Miller (politician) =

American politician

Member of the New Hampshire House of Representatives
- In office 2008–2010
- Constituency: Belknap 3

Personal details
- Party: Democratic

Kate Miller is an American politician from New Hampshire. She served in the New Hampshire House of Representatives.

Miller endorsed the Beto O'Rourke 2020 presidential campaign in the 2020 United States presidential election.
