= Terri Farley =

American writer

American Terri Farley is an American writer of predominantly children's literature and young adult fiction. She is the best-selling author of Seven Tears into the Sea, The Phantom Stallion series for young readers about the contemporary and historic West, and many nonfiction magazine articles.

Farley wrote the adult-oriented romance series Magical Love and Haunting Hearts under the pen name Tess Farraday.

== Biography ==
Farley grew up in Southern California and lives in the foothills of the Sierra Nevada in Verdi, Nevada, with her husband Cory, a journalist and former KSGG 1230 AM radio talk show host, and her pets. She has previously worked as a waitress, journalist, teacher of remedial English.

She received the Silver Pen Award from the University of Nevada in 2010 and was inducted into the Nevada Writers Hall of Fame in November 2017. Her 2015 book Wild at Heart: Mustangs and Young People Fighting to Save Them documenting the plight of wild horses in the North American West, published by Houghton Mifflin Harcourt, was selected as a Junior Literary Guild Selection as well as winner of the Sterling North Heritage award for Excellence in Children's Literature. It was also recommended by the American Association for the Advancement of Science, and a finalist for Best Western Juvenile Nonfiction by the Western Writers of America

She is a founding member of the Society of Children's Book Writers and Illustrators' mentor program. Her Phantom Stallion series has sold more than one million copies. Seven Tears into the Sea was nominated for the ALA Best Books for Young Adults Award.

== Books ==
=== The Phantom Stallion series ===
1. The Wild One
2. Mustang Moon
3. Dark Sunshine
4. The Renegade
5. Free Again
6. The Challenger
7. Desert Dancer
8. Golden Ghost
9. Gift Horse
10. Red Feather Filly
11. Untamed
12. Rain Dance
13. Heartbreak Bronco
14. Moonrise
15. Kidnapped Colt
16. The Wildest Heart
17. Mountain Mare
18. Firefly
19. Secret Star
20. Blue Wings
21. Dawn Runner
22. Wild Honey
23. Gypsy Gold
24. Run Away Home

=== Phantom Stallion: Wild Horse Island series ===
1. The Horse Charmer (May 22, 2007)
2. The Shining Stallion (August 21, 2007)
3. Rain Forest Rose (November 2007)
4. Castaway Colt (January 2008)
5. Fire Maiden (March 2008)
6. Sea Shadow (May 2008)
7. Mist Walker (July 2008)
8. Water Lilly (September 2008)
9. Snowfire (October 20, 2008)
10. Faraway Filly (December 23, 2008)
11. Galloping Gold (March 2009)

=== Magical Love series ===
Written under the name Tess Farraday.

1. Sea Spell
2. Blue Rain

=== Haunting Hearts series ===
Written under the name Tess Farraday.

1. Shadows in the Flame
2. Snow in Summer

=== Other ===
- Seven Tears into the Sea
- Tumbleweed Heart
- Star of Wonder also by Jo Beverley, Alice Alfonsi, and Kate Freiman
