= Texas's 145th House of Representatives district =

American legislative district

Texas's 145th State House of Representatives district
Representative
Christina Morales; D–Houston
- Demographics: 23.5% White; 9.1% Black; 63.4% Hispanic; 3.6% Asian
- Population (2020) • Voting age: 188,902; 146,523

The 145th district of the Texas House of Representatives contains parts of Houston. The current representative is Christina Morales, who has represented the district since 2019.
