= Cesar Blanco =

American politician

César Blanco
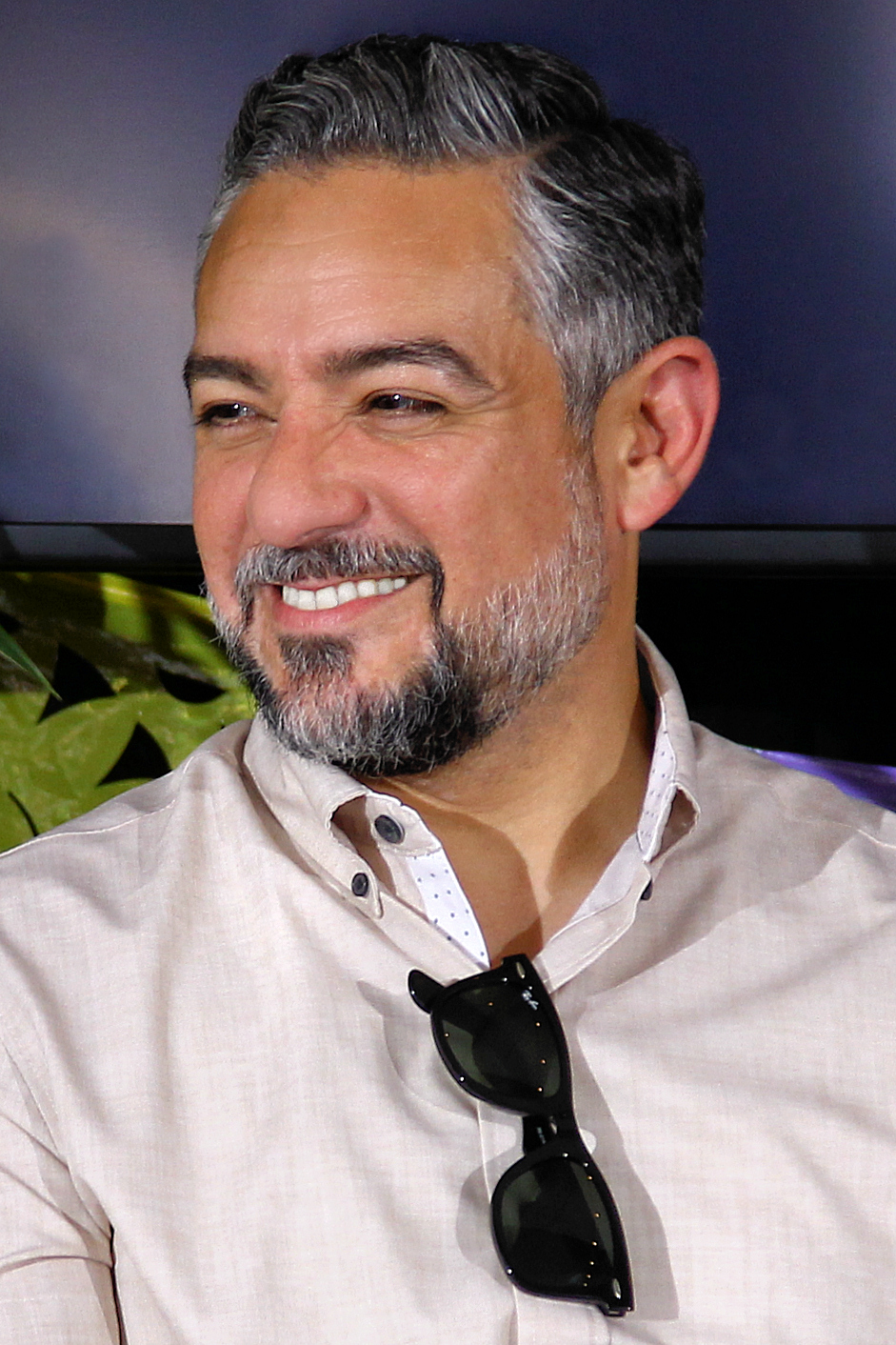
- Blanco in 2023

Member of the Texas Senate from the 29th district
- Incumbent
- Assumed office January 12, 2021
- Preceded by: José R. Rodríguez

Member of the Texas House of Representatives from the 76th district
- In office January 13, 2015 – January 12, 2021
- Preceded by: Naomi Gonzalez
- Succeeded by: Claudia Ordaz Perez

Personal details
- Born: April 23, 1976 (age 50)
- Party: Democratic
- Education: University of Texas at El Paso (BA)
- Occupation: Consultant
- Website: Office website Campaign website

César Jose Blanco is an American politician who currently serves as a member of the Texas Senate representing the 29th district. He has represented the district since 2021 as a Democrat, and previously served in the Texas House of Representatives.

== Early life and education ==
Blanco was raised in El Paso by a single mother and graduated from Eastwood High School. Before pursuing a college education, Blanco served in the U.S. Navy as a missile stinger gunner and military intelligence analyst. With the help of the G.I. Bill, he attended the University of Texas at El Paso and graduated with a B.A. in political science with a minor in history.

== Career ==
Blanco's work in politics began when he worked for U.S. Congressman Sivestre Reyes as a caseworker and field representative.

He then served as chief of staff to U.S. Representatives Pete Gallego and Ciro Rodriguez, from Texas's 23rd congressional district. He also worked as a Congressional Relations Officer for the United States Department of Veterans Affairs.

In February 2016, he was named Political Director of the Latino Victory Project, becoming the group's interim president later that year.

=== Texas House of Representatives ===
In 2014, Blanco ran for the Texas House 76th seat and won. He ran unopposed and was reelected in 2016 and in 2018.

For two terms, Blanco served as the whip for the House Democratic Caucus. While for all three of his terms he served as Chairman of the Texas House Border Caucus and was a member of the Mexican American Legislative Caucus and LGBTQ Caucus. In 2017, Blanco served as the Vice-Chair on the House Committee on Defense and Veterans' Affairs.

In 2015, Texas Monthly named him one of the best Texas legislators of the year.

=== Texas Senate ===
Blanco (third from left overall; standing in back) with other Texas state legislators and Massachusetts Governor Maura Healey at the Massachusetts State House during the 2025 Texas walkout

In September 2019, State Senator Jose Rodriguez – a Democrat representing Texas's 29th District – announced that after 10 years in office he would not seek re-election in the upcoming 2020 election. Following the announcement, speculation arose that Blanco would be a potential candidate to succeed Rodriguez with the Latino Victory Fund even launching a campaign encouraging Blanco to run.

Three days after the retirement announcement, Blanco announced his candidacy to replace Rodriguez. In an interview with the El Paso Times, Blanco cited education, healthcare, and infrastructure as his top three priorities.

Blanco defeated Republican candidate and small business owner Bethany Hatch and was elected to the Texas Senate receiving 176,360 votes or 67.3% of the total vote.

Senator Blanco currently serves on the Senate committees on Business & Commerce, Health & Human Services; Natural Resources; and Water, Agriculture, & Rural Affairs. He is also a member of the Sunset Advisory Commission and serves as the Vice-Chairman of the Texas Senate Hispanic Caucus.

In October 2021, Blanco announced his plans to seek re-election and won his re-election campaign in November 2022.

Texas Senate
| Preceded by José R. Rodríguez | Texas State Senator for District 29; 2021–present | Succeeded by |
Texas House of Representatives
| Preceded by Naomi Gonzalez | Texas State Representative from District 76; 2015–2021 | Succeeded by Claudia Ordaz Perez |
