= The Phantom Stallion =

Children's book series by Terri Farley

The Phantom Stallion is a series of children's literature books by American author Terri Farley, first published in 2002 by Avon Books. There are 24 books in the series.

== Premise ==
The series follows protagonist Samantha "Sam" Forster, a 13-year-old girl with auburn hair and blue eyes who shares a unique bond with a wild horse named The Phantom Stallion. Having spent two years away from her family's Nevada cattle ranch to recover from a riding accident, Sam returns home to face new challenges.

== Novels ==
1. The Wild One (July 2002)
2. Mustang Moon (2002)
3. Dark Sunshine (October 2002)
4. The Renegade (November 2002)
5. Free Again (January 2003)
6. The Challenger (March 2003)
7. Desert Dancer (May 2003)
8. Golden Ghost (July 2003)
9. Gift Horse (October 2003)
10. Red Feather Filly (February 2004)
11. Untamed (April 2004)
12. Rain Dance (July 2004)
13. Heartbreak Bronco (October 2004)
14. Moonrise (February 2005)
15. Kidnapped Colt (April 2005)
16. The Wildest Heart (June 2005)
17. Mountain Mare (September 2005)
18. Firefly (October 2005)
19. Secret Star (January 2006)
20. Blue Wings (February 2006)
21. Dawn Runner (May 2006)
22. Wild Honey (July 2006)
23. Gypsy Gold (September 2006)
24. Run Away Home (December 2006)

== Wild Horse Island Series ==
A spin-off series, The Phantom Stallion: Wild Horse Island, consists of 11 books. This series follow the character of Darby Carter while she lives on her grandfather's ranch in Hawaii.
