= Peer Health Exchange =

U.S. nonprofit organization

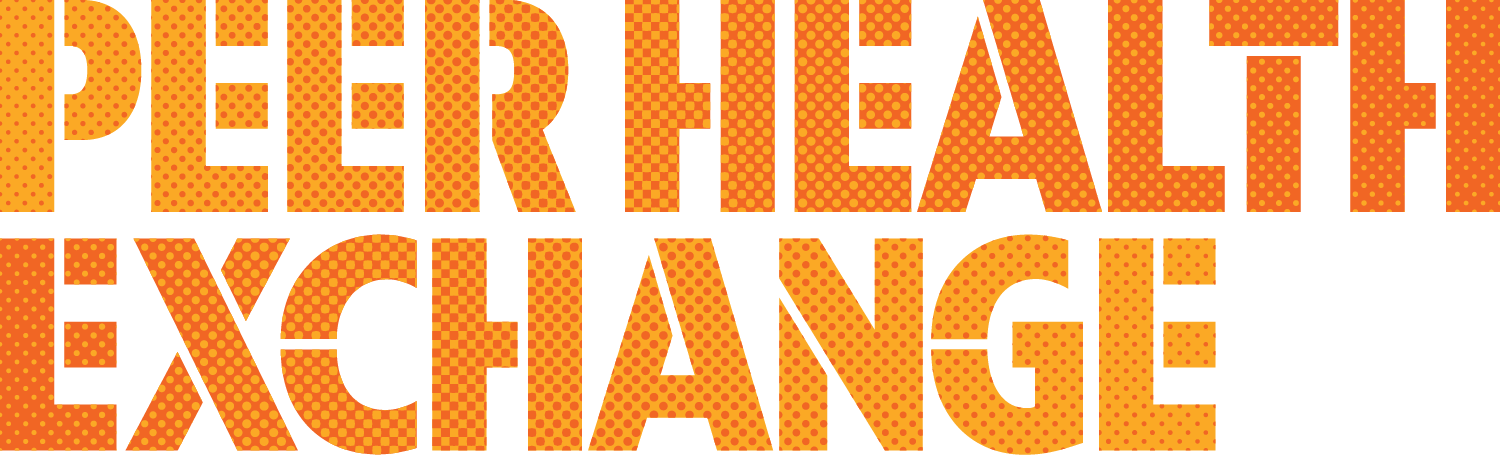
- Established: 2003; 23 years ago
- Founder: Louise Langheier, CEO
- Type: Nonprofit health education
- Location: Oakland, California
- Key people: Emily Medress, Head of External Affairs; Dr. Angela Glymph, VP of Programs & Strategic Learning; Ladawn Best, Chief Sites Officer; Osayuware Enagbare, VP of Talent and Equity; Babak Motie, Chief Financial Officer; Ariane Graham Left, VP of Business Development
- Revenue: $5,436,085 (2019)
- Website: www.peerhealthexchange.org

Peer Health Exchange is an American non-profit health education organization based in Oakland, California. The organization trains college student volunteers to teach skills-based health education in public high schools in low-income communities that lack comprehensive health education. The vision of Peer Health Exchange is that, one day, all teens will have the knowledge and skills to make healthy decisions, advancing health equity for teens in under-resourced communities.

As of June 2021, the organization has nine communities with active volunteers, including Boston, New York City, Chicago, Los Angeles, San Francisco Bay Area, Denver, Dallas, Detroit and Stockton.

Peer Health Exchange partners with Headspace (company) to provide a Mental health platform for US teens for free.

== Background ==
Peer Health Exchange (PHE) works to provide this education in public high schools, specifically about sexual and health education. Their goal is to prevent growing trends in adolescents engaging in risky or harmful behavior in sexual and personal spheres of their lives.

== History ==
In 1999, six graduates from Yale University began going into underfunded and understaffed public high schools in New Haven, Connecticut, to teach health workshops. The founding members of this New Haven group, (which now reaches ten New Haven public schools with over 100 volunteers) established Peer Health Exchange, Inc in 2003. They brought their program to New York City first, training over 150 volunteers from Barnard College, Columbia University, and New York University and reaching 1300 low-income high school students that would otherwise have not received any health education in school. In 2006, PHE launched a program in Boston, training college students from Boston University and Harvard College. In the 2006–2007 school year, PHE trained more than 270 volunteers in Boston and New York City and reached 1,600 high school students. The program has also been extended into Chicago, Illinois, training college students from DePaul University, University of Chicago, Northwestern University, and University of Illinois Chicago Campus. To further its impact, in July 2007, PHE initiated a five-year growth plan to deepen impact in current cities and spread throughout the country to new sites, including Mills College, University of Southern California, California State University Northridge, St. Mary's College of California, and University of California, Berkeley. In 2018, the biggest site is New York City reaching high schools in all five boroughs and long standing college chapters include CUNY schools such as Hunter College, City College, Brooklyn College, Queens College, LaGuardia Community College, York College, and College of Staten Island.

In order to provide teenagers with knowledge of sexual and health education, PHE works with public high schools where much of the student body is living at or below the poverty threshold and is at a higher risk for health issues like teenage pregnancy or obesity.

The volunteers are recruited and chosen from surrounding colleges and then trained in the PHE curriculum which includes 12 standardized health workshops highlighting issues like: substance abuse, nutrition, and sexual health. They are often students including public service in many areas of their life and 90% of past volunteers express that PHE affected their career goals after college. Using the slightly older students as peers, PHE offers the benefits of peer education while using traditional methods of instruction. The volunteers speak to the students in ways relevant to their everyday lives and can serve as role models demonstrating healthy behavior. The high school students are encouraged to articulate their values and goals while learning basic, accurate health information. They are encouraged to explore the way the media and their peers perceive and act towards issues of health. Part of the PHE curriculum is to help the students practice their communication skills as well as risk evaluation, prevention, decision-making through role-playing resembling true to life situations.

Peer Health Exchange hopes that their volunteers will help teenagers protect their bodies and lives while providing them with the knowledge and skills. Their hope is that they can apply the skills learned in PHE workshops outside of the classroom by making informed decisions. Their ultimate goal is to keep the students in—and excelling in—school, in the workforce, staying away from risky behavior, and building on a healthy future.

In 2021, Peer Health Exchange launched Selfsea, an app that provides first-person videos of young people talking about mental health, sex, and body image.

In May 2022, Peer Health Exchange partnered with Brightline to develop teen-focused materials for its platform and mobile app.

== Funding ==
In 2019, the organization received $4,891,613 in contributions and grants and reported a total revenue of $5,436,085. Total expenses in 2019 was $9,909,111.

== See also ==
- Adolescent sexuality in the United States
- Teen dating violence
- Mental health Issues
- Sex Education
