= Teen dating violence =

Abuse by one partner against another within a dating relationship among adolescents

Teen dating violence is the physical, sexual, or psychological / emotional abuse (or violence) within a dating relationship among adolescents. Intimate partner violence (IPV) has been a well examined and documented phenomenon in adults; however, there has not been nearly as much study on violence in adolescent dating relationships, and it is therefore not as well understood. The research has mainly focused on Caucasian youth, and, as of 2013, there are no studies which focus specifically on IPV in adolescent same-sex relationships.

IPV among adolescents occurs at a critical period in the social and mental development of a person. Therefore, it is associated with different psychological as well as physical long-term adverse outcomes.

== Gender differences ==
The literature on IPV among adolescents indicates that the rates are similar for the number of girls and boys in heterosexual relationships who report experiencing IPV, or that girls in heterosexual relationships are more likely than their male counterparts to report perpetrating IPV. Ely et al. stated that, unlike domestic violence in general, equal rates of IPV perpetration is a unique characteristic with regard adolescent dating violence, and that this is "perhaps because the period of adolescence, a special developmental state, is accompanied by sexual characteristics that are distinctly different from the characteristics of adult." Wekerle and Wolfe theorized that "a mutually coercive and violent dynamic may form during adolescence, a time when males and females are more equal on a physical level" and that this "physical equality allows girls to assert more power through physical violence than is possible for an adult female attacked by a fully physically mature man."

Regarding studies that indicate that girls are as likely or more likely than boys to commit IPV, the authors emphasize that substantial differences exist between the genders, including that girls are significantly more likely than boys to report having experienced severe IPV, such as being threatened with a weapon, punched, strangled, beaten, burned, or raped. Girls are also substantially more likely than boys to need psychological help or experience physical injuries that require medical help for the abuse, and to report sexual violence as a part of dating violence. They are also more likely to take IPV more seriously.

By contrast, boys are more likely to report experiencing less severe acts, such as being pinched, slapped, scratched or kicked. Girls are more likely to report committing less serious forms of IPV, including as a means of self-defense, whereas boys are more likely to report committing more severe acts of IPV, including threats, physical violence and controlling a partner. That girls are more likely to engage in IPV as a result of self-defense is supported by findings that previous victimization is a stronger predictor of perpetration in females than in males. Other research indicates that boys who have been abused in childhood by a family member are more prone to IPV perpetration, while girls who have been abused in childhood by a family member are prone to lack empathy and self-efficacy; but the risks for the likelihood of IPV perpetration and victimization among adolescents vary and are not well understood.

== Debates ==
There is a common misconception that aggression is stable over time. That is, young people who are labeled as or considered to be violent and aggressive at any point in time are then assumed to be dangerous for the rest of their lives. This is a contentious issue because there is a desire to protect both parties involved (or that have the potential to become involved) in teen dating violence. While classifying the perpetrator as a threat may be detrimental to his or her life and future relationships, not classifying the perpetrator this way may put future partners at risk.

There is considerable debate over whether we as a society have an accurate picture of the prevalence and severity of teen dating violence by gender. Although male and female adolescents do not differ in "overall frequency of violence in dating relationships," females are subject to "significantly higher levels of severe violence". This fact raises the question of whether abuse should be evaluated based on “severity” and how that can and should be measured, or if all abuse should be considered equally harmful.

Age of consent is an issue that cannot be ignored in the discussion of teenage dating violence. Teenage sex is regulated in such a way that "age of consent laws render teenagers below a certain age incapable of consent to sexual activity with adults, and sometimes with peers". In some cases, the adult may be just a few months older than the minor. There are a number of states in which "age of consent statutes are used to prosecute consensual sex between two persons both under the age of consent." This type of prosecution has been deemed unconstitutional in some states by citing violation of privacy rights, but remains in effect in other states. Sexual behavior and aggression can be so deeply intertwined that the legality of underage consensual sex is sure to have an effect on teen dating violence.

== Nature vs. nurture ==
Significant research has been done on the causes behind violent behavior in adolescent dating relationships with the intention of guiding the creation of dating violence prevention programs, and in turn has provided findings on the roles of nature and nurture in the development of such behavior with a strong favor towards nurture factors. A study published in the Journal of Epidemiology and Community Health examined the potential association between a spectrum of childhood adverse experiences and physical violence in relationships before age 21 for both members. The subjects were asked questions about violence in their adolescent relationships, as either victim or perpetrator, and their childhood surrounding twelve different adversities: parental death, parental divorce, long-term separation from parent, parental mental illness, parental substance abuse disorder, parental criminality, inter-parental violence, serious physical illness in childhood, physical abuse, sexual abuse, neglect, and family economic adversity. The results demonstrated a strong positive correlation between ten out of the twelve childhood adversities and physically violent behavior in a teen relationship, with 13.8% responding with experiences of sexual violence, and 11.6% experiencing inter-parental violence. This points to a strong influence of experience, or nature, on violent tendencies in adolescent relationships. Multiple other studies corroborate these findings, citing childhood bullying, assault, and maltreatment as significant indicators for future violence in adolescent dating. Though there has been little explicit study of the relationship between nature and teen dating violence, there has been proven correlation between testosterone levels and violent tendencies that could come to fruition in adolescent dating relationships.

== Prevalence and approaches ==
The literature on IPV among adolescents primarily focuses on Caucasian youth, and there are yet no studies which focus specifically on IPV in adolescent same-sex romantic relationships.

Almost 32% of male adolescents engage in some form of violence, whether sexual, physical or emotional, towards their partners while adolescent violence from females is nearly half of that rate. According to the United States public health authority, the Centers for Disease Control and Prevention (CDC), "adolescents and adults are often unaware that teens experience dating violence."

=== United States ===
==== Statistics ====
While dating, domestic and sexual violence affect women regardless of their age, teens and young women are especially vulnerable. Young people ages 12 to 19 experience the highest rates of rape and sexual assault, and people age 18 and 19 experience the highest rates of stalking. Approximately one in three adolescent girls in the United States is a victim of physical, emotional, or verbal abuse from a dating partner—a figure that far exceeds victimization rates for other types of violence affecting youth; According to Women's Health, "81% of parents surveyed either believed dating violence is not an issue or admit they don't know if it's an issue". This indicates a large gap in understanding, in light of the growth of dating abuse in teenagers' relationships. Dating violence has advanced through the years by the means of communication technology. A 2006 survey conducted by Teenage Research Unlimited stated that 10% "claim they have been threatened physically via email, IM, text, chat, etc."

A 2008 meta-analysis, which examined 62 empirical research studies between 1996 and 2006, relating to domestic violence in heterosexual intimate relationships from adolescence through to adulthood in the United States, reported on research findings that consistently show that adolescent females commit significantly more acts of domestic violence in intimate relationships than adolescent males. It stated, however, that the "data also suggest that females who commit acts of domestic violence may experience more violent or frequent IPV victimization than males" and that "[t]he highest rates [for female-perpetrated IPV] were found for emotional violence, followed by physical and sexual violence. Prevalence rates varied widely within each population, most likely due to methodological and sampling differences across studies." The authors added, "Few longitudinal studies existed, limiting the extent to which we could identify developmental patterns associated with female perpetrated intimate partner violence." They found a few studies which reported prevalence rates of IPV perpetration among females at two or more time points, which they stated made "it difficult to obtain a clear picture of the developmental patterns associated with this type of violence." There was also only one study that reported on prevalence rates over time for female perpetrated IPV among adolescents. "This study found a significant increase in prevalence over a six month period; however, they measured lifetime perpetration of IPV, therefore, it is unclear if there was an actual increase or simply an accumulation of violence," stated the authors. "Together, these studies provide very limited evidence that female perpetration of IPV may follow a similar developmental trajectory as other forms of violence. [...] Unfortunately, many of the studies included in this review used modified or alternative instruments making it difficult to accurately compare prevalence estimates."

In a 2009 survey, the CDC found that 9.8% of high school students in the U.S. reported having been intentionally physically hurt by their boyfriend or girlfriend in the preceding 12 months. A 2011 CDC nationwide survey of the U.S. population reported that 23% of females and 14% of males who ever experienced rape, other physical violence, or stalking by an intimate partner first experienced some form of partner violence between 11 and 17 years of age. The ages between 16 and 24 are when youth are the most susceptible to dating violence. Also, according to the CDC, one in ten teens will be physically abused between seventh and twelfth grade. Because of this abuse, victims are more likely to abuse drugs and alcohol, employ precarious sexual conduct, develop eating disorders, and attempt suicide. Males learning violent behaviors coupled with females thinking it normative creates a cycle of women being abused, learning to accept it and imparting this idea to their children and repeating the process. According to a study conducted by Susan M. Sanders, many adolescents do not always view aggressive behavior as violent or abusive and roughly 77.6% young girls agreed that after a physical altercation such as being kicked by their partner that they would cease to date them. The study conducted demonstrated that many adolescents, primarily females, were more susceptible to leave only after a physical altercation took place. With these studies it was found that once a physical altercation took place the victim would then view it as abusive and eventually desire to leave the relationship.

Raychelle Cassada Lohmann, the author of The Sexual Trauma Workbook for Teen Girls, emphasizes that isolation and monopolization of partner's time are the main reasons why this kind of violence occurs between the teens. Besides, the author indicates that generally only half of parents in the US have conversations about teen dating violence with their kids.

Digital dating abuse (also referred to as "electronic dating violence" is another form of teen dating violence which has received increased attention from youth-serving professionals. Based on data from a national sample of 2,218 English-speaking 12- to 17-year-old middle and high school students in the United States, Sameer Hinduja and Justin Patchin define it as a pattern of technology-facilitated, controlling behaviors, exhibited by one person toward another within a current or former romantic relationship. In their research, they found that 28.1% of teens who had been in a romantic relationship at some point in the previous year said they had been the victim of at least one form of digital dating abuse while 35.9% had been the victim at least one form of traditional (offline) dating abuse. They also identified a strong overlap between digital and traditional forms of dating abuse: 81% of the students who had been the target of digital dating abuse had also been the target of traditional dating 63% of those who had been the victim of offline dating violence also had been the victim of online dating violence. In this study, males were significantly more likely to have experienced digital dating abuse (32.3%) compared to females (23.6%).

==== Legislation ====
In the United States, the National Conference of State Legislators (NCSL) states that " policymakers can play a role in preventing teen dating violence" and lists those states that currently have laws requiring school boards to develop and adopt programs to address this issue. Further, according to NCSL "[i]n 2011 at least eight states have introduced legislation to address teen dating violence". On January 31, 2011, President Obama proclaimed February 2011 to be "National Teen Dating Violence Awareness and Prevention Month". In 2006 the U.S. first recognized "National Teen Dating Violence Awareness and Prevention Week", sponsored by Senator Mike Crapo, to "increase public awareness and education of the prevalence of teen dating violence among our nation's teens". The first week in February was so recognized through 2009. Beginning in 2010, Senator Crapo joined the Department of Justice in recognizing February as Teen Dating Violence Awareness and Prevention Month.

==== National helpline and organizations ====
The National Dating Abuse Helpline, created by National Domestic Violence Hotline, is a 24-hour nationwide Web-based and telephone resource created to help teens and young people who are experiencing dating abuse. They offer information on building healthy relationships and how to recognize warning signs. It is the only helpline in the country serving all 50 states, Puerto Rico, and the Virgin Islands.

- Futures Without Violence
- Jennifer Ann's Group
- Loveisrespect, National Teen Dating Abuse Helpline
- National Domestic Violence Hotline
- Peer Health Exchange

=== United Kingdom ===
In 2010, a campaign by the Home Office featured adverts targeting "boys and girls aged 13 to 18" via television, radio, Internet, and poster campaigns. The campaign followed research by the NSPCC indicating that approximately one-quarter of 13- to 17-year-old females had experienced physical abuse from a dating partner.

== See also ==
- Outline of domestic violence
- Reproductive coercion
