= Pressbox =

Laundry company

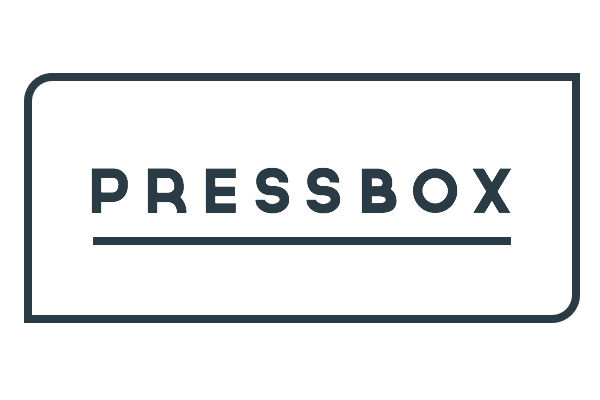
Pressbox company logo

Pressbox is an on-demand dry cleaning and laundry service company founded by Vijen Patel and Drew McKenna in 2013 and acquired by Procter & Gamble in 2018.

== Founding ==
Vijen Patel and Drew McKenna met at the University of Notre Dame as undergraduate students.

In 2012, Patel was working in private equity, particularly focusing on retail. Patel's business ethos premised that any highly fragmented vertical market lacking technology and branding was ripe for disruption. Operating on this belief, Patel partnered with Drew McKenna (who was then running game day operations at the University of Notre Dame) to create a new laundry service that would turn a “chore into an experience”, according to Patel. Cofounder McKenna noted that the laundry industry, at the time, was “antiquated” and in need of “hands-on technology”.

== Operations ==
In 2013, Patel and McKenna launched Pressbox in Chicago, Illinois. Pressbox eliminated storefront rent and labor costs through proprietary lockers in high-end residential buildings and neighborhoods in urban cities. This allowed residential buildings to use Pressbox services as a building amenity with no additional costs, while also reaching customers not typically able to drop off laundry during regular business hours. It was also marketed to younger generations who were not as loyal to traditional laundry brands and more willing to outsource chores.

Dry cleaning and wash and fold laundry services were accessible twenty-four hours a day, seven days a week, and users could utilize a mobile phone application to track their orders. Customers dropped off laundry at a nearby locker location, then Pressbox drivers would deliver items to a local, third-party launderer. Finished laundry would then be returned to the locker within 48 hours, and customers would retrieve their items with a unique access code. Customers could customize their laundry preferences, such as wash temperature, through the application. Belt and zipper repairs were also available. Prices were comparable to traditional cleaners. Within five years, the company grew to serve over 100,000 consumers, with 150 employees and an anticipated 2,000 locations.

== Acquisition ==
In July 2018, Procter & Gamble acquired Pressbox for an undisclosed sum. The company was later rebranded as Tide Cleaners. The acquisition aligned with Procter & Gamble's initiative to capture the out-of-home market (which at the time was 26 million American households) and expand the Tide brand into Pressbox's user demographics. Following the acquisition, Procter & Gamble added new locations and grew their customer base. For example, the company marketed services to college campuses, with long-term plans to move into supermarkets and convenience stores. Both founders, Vijen Patel and Drew McKenna, continued to work for Pressbox following the acquisition. Patel became CEO of Tide Cleaners in 2018 and transitioned to an advisory role in July 2020.
