= José R. Rodríguez =

American politician

José Rodríguez

Minority Leader of the Texas Senate
- In office October 12, 2015 – January 8, 2020
- Preceded by: Kirk Watson
- Succeeded by: Carol Alvarado

Member of the Texas Senate from the 29th district
- In office January 11, 2011 – January 12, 2021
- Preceded by: Eliot Shapleigh
- Succeeded by: Cesar Blanco

Personal details
- Born: March 1, 1948 (age 78) Alice, Texas, U.S.
- Party: Democratic
- Education: University of Texas, Pan American (BA); George Washington University (JD)

José R. Rodríguez (born March 1, 1948) is an American attorney and politician. He served as a Democratic member of the Texas State Senate, representing District 29 in El Paso, Texas from 2011 to 2021.

== Early life and education ==
Rodríguez was born to migrant laborer parents in Alice in Jim Wells County, Texas. From a young age, he worked alongside them in the fields to help support a family of nine.

Rodríguez graduated from the University of Texas - Pan American, then known as Pan American University, in Edinburg in South Texas. As an undergraduate in 1971, he served as student body president. He received his Juris Doctor degree from the George Washington University Law School in Washington, D.C. in 1974.

== Legal career ==
Rodríguez began his legal career by working for the United States Department of Housing and Urban Development under the Ford and Carter administrations. He previously worked as staff attorney for Texas Rural Legal Aid, Inc., a statewide legal services program. For 17 years prior to his election to the Texas State Senate, Rodríguez served as the El Paso County Attorney.

Rodríguez's legal work has concentrated on education and community health, as well as funding for jobs and economic development.

== Political career ==
In 2010, Rodríguez won the Democratic primary election with 69 percent of ballots cast. He won 60 percent of the vote in the general election for the seat vacated by the retiring Senator Eliot Shapleigh. In the next election in 2012, Rodríguez won 100 percent of the primary vote and in the general election held on November 2, he defeated Republican candidate Dan Chavez with 50,460 (60.2 percent) of the vote to Chavez's 33,303 (39.8 percent).

Rodríguez was an active legislator; in his freshman term, he proposed over 40 bills relating to education, health care, economic development, renewable energy, public safety and the courts, ethics and government transparency, and the military. For this effort, the online publication Capitol Inside awarded him the title of "Freshman MVP." Other awards include "Legislative Hero" by Texas Access to Justice Foundation; "Best of Senate" by the Combined Law Enforcement Association of Texas; and "Advocate of the Year, Elected Official" by Texas Association for Education of Young Children. In his second term, Rodríguez proposed 50 bills and two concurrent resolutions.

Rodriguez served on several Senate committees: Agriculture (Vice-Chair), Natural Resources & Economic Development, Transportation, and Water & Rural Affairs. He announced his intention to retire and not seek reelection in 2020.

Texas Senate
Preceded by Eliot Shapleigh	Member of the Texas Senate from the 29th district 2011–2021	Succeeded by Cesar Blanco
Preceded by Kirk Watson	Minority Leader of the Texas Senate; 2015–2020	Succeeded by Carol Alvarado
