= Jennifer's Law =

Law in Texas

Texas Legislature
- Long title: An Act to permit posthumous diplomas for deceased high school seniors
- Citation: Texas Senate Bill 697 / House Bill 1563 (2007)
- Territorial extent: Texas, United States
- Enacted by: Texas Legislature
- Enacted: June 15, 2007
- Commenced: June 15, 2007

Legislative history
- Introduced by: Senator Eliot Shapleigh (SB 697); Representative Bolton (HB 1563)
- Introduced: February 15, 2007

Summary
- Allows Texas school districts to award posthumous diplomas to eligible deceased seniors
- Status: In force

Jennifer's Law is a law in the U.S. state of Texas that permits school districts to award posthumous diplomas to students who die during their senior year of high school.

== Namesake ==
The law is named for Jennifer Ann Crecente, an Austin, Texas high school senior who was murdered a few months before her graduation by a former boyfriend (and Ortralla Mosley). Though she was on track for her diploma, the district did not award one to her posthumously. Thus, her family petitioned for a change in the law.

== History ==
On February 15, 2007, Senator Eliot Shapleigh from El Paso, Texas filed SB 697 in the Texas Senate to create "Jennifer's Law." Representative Bolton filed companion bill HB 1563 in the Texas House of Representatives. The bill passed the Education Committees of both the Senate and House unanimously.

The Texas Senate passed the bill on May 23, 2007, followed by the Texas House on May 25, 2007. Both chambers passed the bill unanimously (31-0 in the Senate and 146–0 in the House with two "present/not voting"), which allowed the bill to take effect immediately upon the Governor's signature. Governor Rick Perry signed by the governor on June 15, 2007.

== Usage ==
"Jennifer's Law" allows for parents of a deceased high school student (the student does not have to be the victim of a crime to qualify) to request a posthumous diploma from the school district in Texas to which the student's high school belongs, subject to the following conditions:

- The student must have been enrolled in their Senior year of high school.
- The law applies to students beginning the school year of 2005–2006 (this was Jennifer's senior year; thus making her eligible for the diploma).
- The student must have academically been "on track" to receive a diploma by the end of the year. The definition of "the end of the year" would include a summer session.
- The student must not have been convicted of a felony or adjudicated as having committed actions that would constitute a felony.
