= Texas's 29th Senate district =

American legislative district

Texas's 29th State Senate district
Senator
Cesar Blanco; D–El Paso
- Demographics: 12.4% White; 4.2% Black; 82.2% Hispanic; 1.9% Asian
- Population: 853,350

District 29 of the Texas Senate is a senatorial district that currently serves all of Culberson, El Paso, Hudspeth, Jeff Davis, Pecos, Presidio, and Reeves counties, and a portion of Brewster county in the U.S. state of Texas.

The current senator from District 29 is Cesar Blanco.

== Biggest cities in the district ==
District 29 has a population of 816,681 with 571,426 that is at voting age from the 2010 census.

	Name	County	Pop. (Note: Population is based on the number of people in the district in that city, not the overall population of that city)
1	El Paso	El Paso	649,121
2	Socorro	El Paso	32,013
3	Horizon City	El Paso	16,735
4	Anthony	El Paso	5,011
5	Van Horn	Culberson	2,063

== Election history ==
Election history of District 30 from 1992. (Note: Uncontested primary elections are not shown.)

=== 2024 ===
Texas general election, 2024: Senate District 29
Party	Candidate	Votes	%	±%
Democratic	Cesar Blanco (Incumbent)	174,731	100.00	+35.91
Majority		174,731	100.00	+71.82
Turnout		174,731		
Democratic hold				

=== 2022 ===
Texas general election, 2022: Senate District 29
Party	Candidate	Votes	%	±%
Democratic	Cesar Blanco (Incumbent)	111,638	64.09	−3.23
Republican	Derek Zubeldia	62,544	35.91	+3.23
Majority		49,094	28.18	−6.46
Turnout		174,182	100.00	
Democratic hold				

=== 2020 ===
Texas general election, 2020: Senate District 29
Party	Candidate	Votes	%	±%
Democratic	Cesar Blanco	176,360	67.32	−32.68
Republican	Bethany Hatch	85,619	32.68	+32.68
Majority		90,741	34.64	−65.36
Turnout		261,979	100.00	
Democratic hold				

=== 2016 ===
Texas general election, 2016: Senate District 29
Party	Candidate	Votes	%	±%
Democratic	Jose R. Rodriguez (Incumbent)	167,169	100.00	+31.40
Majority		167,169	100.00	+62.80
Turnout		167,169		
Democratic hold				

=== 2012 ===
Texas general election, 2012: Senate District 29
Party	Candidate	Votes	%	±%
Democratic	Jose R. Rodriguez (Incumbent)	116,208	68.60	+8.36
Republican	Dan Chavez	53,190	31.40	−8.36
Majority		63,018	37.20	+16.72
Turnout		169,398		
Democratic hold				

=== 2010 ===
Texas general election, 2010: Senate District 29
Party	Candidate	Votes	%	±%
Democratic	Jose R. Rodriguez	50,460	60.24	+1.45
Republican	Dan Chavez	33,303	39.76	−1.45
Majority		17,157	20.48	+2.91
Turnout		83,763		
Democratic hold				

=== 2006 ===
Texas general election, 2006: Senate District 29
Party	Candidate	Votes	%	±%
Democratic	Eliot Shapleigh (Incumbent)	51,531	58.79	−41.21
Republican	Donald R. "Dee" Margo	36,127	41.21	+41.21
Majority		15,404	17.57	−82.43
Turnout		87,658		+19.74
Democratic hold				

=== 2002 ===
Texas general election, 2002: Senate District 29
Party	Candidate	Votes	%	±%
Democratic	Eliot Shapleigh (Incumbent)	73,205	100.00	0.00
Majority		73,205	100.00	0.00
Turnout		73,205		−27.55
Democratic hold				

=== 2000 ===
Texas general election, 2000: Senate District 29
Party	Candidate	Votes	%	±%
Democratic	Eliot Shapleigh (Incumbent)	101,045	100.00	+26.28
Majority		101,045	100.00	+52.55
Turnout		101,045		−17.11
Democratic hold				

=== 1996 ===
Texas general election, 1996: Senate District 29
Party	Candidate	Votes	%	±%
Democratic	Eliot Shapleigh	89,868	73.72	−26.28
Republican	Randy Berry	32,029	26.28	+26.28
Majority		57,839	47.45	−52.55
Turnout		121,897		+89.85
Democratic hold				

Democratic primary runoff, 1996: Senate District 29
Candidate		Votes	%	±
✓	Eliot Shapleigh	24,666	61.82	+26.30
	Hector Villa	15,235	38.18	+18.70
Majority		9,431	23.64	
Turnout		39,901		

Democratic primary, 1996: Senate District 29
Candidate		Votes	%	±
	Ray Mancera	8,672	17.38	
	Rene Nunez	5,758	11.54	
✓	Eliot Shapleigh	17,723	35.52	
	Marie Tarvin-Garland	8,017	16.07	
✓	Hector Villa	9,722	19.49	
Turnout		49,892		

=== 1994 ===
Texas general election, 1994: Senate District 29
Party	Candidate	Votes	%	±%
Democratic	Peggy Rosson (Incumbent)	64,207	100.00	0.00
Majority		64,207	100.00	0.00
Turnout		64,207		−34.79
Democratic hold				

=== 1992 ===
Texas general election, 1992: Senate District 29
Party	Candidate	Votes	%	±%
Democratic	Peggy Rosson (Incumbent)	98,461	100.00	
Majority		98,461	100.00	
Turnout		98,461		
Democratic hold				

Democratic primary, 1992: Senate District 29
Candidate		Votes	%	±
	Bonnie Rangel Guaderrama	13,114	31.22	
	Malcolm McGregor	5,018	11.95	
✓	Peggy Rosson (Incumbent)	23,870	56.83	
Majority		10,756	25.61	
Turnout		42,002		

== District officeholders ==
Legislature	Senator, District 29	Counties in District
5	James H. Durst	Kinney, Nueces, Refugio, San Patricio, Starr, Webb.
6	Edward R. Hord	Kinney, Nueces, Refugio, San Patricio, Starr, Webb.
7	Forbes Britton	Kinney, Nueces, Refugio, San Patricio, Starr, Webb.
8	Benjamin Franklin Neal; Forbes Britton	Kinney, Nueces, Refugio, San Patricio, Starr, Webb.
9	Pryor Lea	Bee, Dimmit, Goliad, Karnes, La Salle, Live Oak, McMullen, Nueces, Refugio, San Patricio.
10	Pryor Lea	Bee, Dimmit, Goliad, Karnes, La Salle, Live Oak, McMullen, Nueces, Refugio, San Patricio.
11	John T. Littleton	Bee, Dimmit, Goliad, Karnes, La Salle, Live Oak, McMullen, Nueces, Refugio, San Patricio.
12	Theodor Rudolph Hertzberg	Bandera, Bexar, Blanco, Burnet, Comal, Edwards, Gillespie, Kendall, Kerr, Kimble, Llano, Mason, Menard.
13	Henry C. King	Bandera, Bexar, Blanco, Burnet, Comal, Edwards, Gillespie, Kendall, Kerr, Kimble, Llano, Mason, Menard.
14	Joseph E. Dwyer	All of Atascosa, Bandera, Comal, Edwards, Gillespie, Kendall, Kerr, Kimble, Mason, Menard, Wilson. Portion of Bexar.
15	John Salmon "Rip" Ford	Cameron, Dimmit, Duval, Encinal, Frio, Hidalgo, Kinney, La Salle, Live Oak, Maverick, McMullen, Medina, Nueces, San Patricio, Starr, Uvalde, Webb, Zapata, Zavala.
16	John Salmon "Rip" Ford	Cameron, Dimmit, Duval, Encinal, Frio, Hidalgo, Kinney, La Salle, Live Oak, Maverick, McMullen, Medina, Nueces, San Patricio, Starr, Uvalde, Webb, Zapata, Zavala.
17	Charles A. McLane; Stephen Powers	Cameron, Dimmit, Duval, Encinal, Frio, Hidalgo, Kinney, La Salle, Live Oak, Maverick, McMullen, Medina, Nueces, San Patricio, Starr, Uvalde, Webb, Zapata, Zavala.
18	James Richard Fleming	Andrews, Borden, Brown, Callahan, Coleman, Comanche, Concho, Dawson, Eastland, Fisher, Gaines, Howard, Jones, Martin, McCulloch, Mitchell, Nolan, Runnels, San Saba, Scurry, Shackelford, Stephens, Taylor.
19	James Henry Calhoun	Andrews, Borden, Brown, Callahan, Coleman, Comanche, Concho, Dawson, Eastland, Fisher, Gaines, Howard, Jones, Martin, McCulloch, Mitchell, Nolan, Runnels, San Saba, Scurry, Shackelford, Stephens, Taylor.
20	James Henry Calhoun	Andrews, Borden, Brown, Callahan, Coleman, Comanche, Concho, Dawson, Eastland, Fisher, Gaines, Howard, Jones, Martin, McCulloch, Mitchell, Nolan, Runnels, San Saba, Scurry, Shackelford, Stephens, Taylor.
21	Henry T. Sims	Andrews, Borden, Brown, Callahan, Coleman, Comanche, Concho, Dawson, Eastland, Fisher, Gaines, Howard, Jones, Martin, McCulloch, Mitchell, Nolan, Runnels, San Saba, Scurry, Shackelford, Stephens, Taylor.
22	Henry T. Sims	Andrews, Borden, Brown, Callahan, Coleman, Comanche, Concho, Dawson, Eastland, Fisher, Gaines, Howard, Jones, Martin, McCulloch, Mitchell, Nolan, Runnels, San Saba, Scurry, Shackelford, Stephens, Taylor.
23	Demosthenes F. Goss	Archer, Armstrong, Bailey, Baylor, Briscoe, Carson, Castro, Childress, Clay, Cochran, Collingsworth, Cottle, Crosby, Dallam, Deaf Smith, Dickens, Donley, Floyd, Foard, Gray, Greer, Hale, Hall, Hansford, Hardeman, Hartley, Hemphill, Hockley, Hutchinson, Jack, King, Knox, Lamb, Lipscomb, Lubbock, Moore, Motley, Ochiltree, Oldham, Parmer, Potter, Randall, Roberts, Sherman, Swisher, Throckmorton, Wheeler, Wichita, Wilbarger, Young.
24	Demosthenes F. Goss	Archer, Armstrong, Bailey, Baylor, Briscoe, Carson, Castro, Childress, Clay, Cochran, Collingsworth, Cottle, Crosby, Dallam, Deaf Smith, Dickens, Donley, Floyd, Foard, Gray, Greer, Hale, Hall, Hansford, Hardeman, Hartley, Hemphill, Hockley, Hutchinson, Jack, King, Knox, Lamb, Lipscomb, Lubbock, Moore, Motley, Ochiltree, Oldham, Parmer, Potter, Randall, Roberts, Shackelford, Sherman, Swisher, Throckmorton, Wheeler, Wichita, Wilbarger, Young.
25	Demosthenes F. Goss	Archer, Armstrong, Bailey, Baylor, Briscoe, Carson, Castro, Childress, Clay, Cochran, Collingsworth, Cottle, Crosby, Dallam, Deaf Smith, Dickens, Donley, Floyd, Foard, Gray, Greer, Hale, Hall, Hansford, Hardeman, Hartley, Hemphill, Hockley, Hutchinson, Jack, King, Knox, Lamb, Lipscomb, Lubbock, Moore, Motley, Ochiltree, Oldham, Parmer, Potter, Randall, Roberts, Sherman, Swisher, Throckmorton, Wheeler, Wichita, Wilbarger, Young.
26	Demosthenes F. Goss	Archer, Armstrong, Bailey, Baylor, Briscoe, Carson, Castro, Childress, Clay, Cochran, Collingsworth, Cottle, Crosby, Dallam, Deaf Smith, Dickens, Donley, Floyd, Foard, Gray, Greer, Hale, Hall, Hansford, Hardeman, Hartley, Hemphill, Hockley, Hutchinson, Jack, King, Knox, Lamb, Lipscomb, Lubbock, Moore, Motley, Ochiltree, Oldham, Parmer, Potter, Randall, Roberts, Sherman, Swisher, Throckmorton, Wheeler, Wichita, Wilbarger, Young.
27	Demosthenes F. Goss	Archer, Armstrong, Bailey, Baylor, Briscoe, Carson, Castro, Childress, Clay, Cochran, Collingsworth, Cottle, Crosby, Dallam, Deaf Smith, Dickens, Donley, Floyd, Foard, Gray, Greer, Hale, Hall, Hansford, Hardeman, Hartley, Hemphill, Hockley, Hutchinson, Jack, King, Knox, Lamb, Lipscomb, Lubbock, Moore, Motley, Ochiltree, Oldham, Parmer, Potter, Randall, Roberts, Sherman, Swisher, Throckmorton, Wheeler, Wichita, Wilbarger, Young.
28	Davis E. Decker	Archer, Armstrong, Bailey, Baylor, Briscoe, Carson, Castro, Childress, Clay, Cochran, Collingsworth, Cottle, Crosby, Dallam, Deaf Smith, Dickens, Donley, Floyd, Foard, Gray, Hale, Hall, Hansford, Hardeman, Hartley, Hemphill, Hockley, Hutchinson, Jack, King, Knox, Lamb, Lipscomb, Lubbock, Moore, Motley, Ochiltree, Oldham, Parmer, Potter, Randall, Roberts, Sherman, Swisher, Throckmorton, Wheeler, Wichita, Wilbarger, Young.
29	Davis E. Decker	Archer, Armstrong, Bailey, Baylor, Briscoe, Carson, Castro, Childress, Clay, Cochran, Collingsworth, Cottle, Crosby, Dallam, Deaf Smith, Dickens, Donley, Floyd, Foard, Gray, Hale, Hall, Hansford, Hardeman, Hartley, Hemphill, Hockley, Hutchinson, Jack, King, Knox, Lamb, Lipscomb, Lubbock, Moore, Motley, Ochiltree, Oldham, Parmer, Potter, Randall, Roberts, Sherman, Swisher, Throckmorton, Wheeler, Wichita, Wilbarger, Young.
30	John W. Veale	Archer, Armstrong, Bailey, Baylor, Briscoe, Carson, Castro, Childress, Clay, Cochran, Collingsworth, Cottle, Crosby, Dallam, Deaf Smith, Dickens, Donley, Floyd, Foard, Gray, Hale, Hall, Hansford, Hardeman, Hartley, Hemphill, Hockley, Hutchinson, Jack, King, Knox, Lamb, Lipscomb, Lubbock, Moore, Motley, Ochiltree, Oldham, Parmer, Potter, Randall, Roberts, Sherman, Swisher, Throckmorton, Wheeler, Wichita, Wilbarger, Young.
31	John W. Veale	Archer, Armstrong, Bailey, Baylor, Briscoe, Carson, Castro, Childress, Clay, Cochran, Collingsworth, Cottle, Crosby, Dallam, Deaf Smith, Dickens, Donley, Floyd, Foard, Gray, Hale, Hall, Hansford, Hardeman, Hartley, Hemphill, Hockley, Hutchinson, Jack, King, Knox, Lamb, Lipscomb, Lubbock, Moore, Motley, Ochiltree, Oldham, Parmer, Potter, Randall, Roberts, Sherman, Swisher, Throckmorton, Wheeler, Wichita, Wilbarger, Young.
32	Willard A. Johnson	Archer, Armstrong, Bailey, Baylor, Briscoe, Carson, Castro, Childress, Clay, Cochran, Collingsworth, Cottle, Crosby, Dallam, Deaf Smith, Dickens, Donley, Floyd, Foard, Gray, Hale, Hall, Hansford, Hardeman, Hartley, Hemphill, Hockley, Hutchinson, Jack, King, Knox, Lamb, Lipscomb, Lubbock, Moore, Motley, Ochiltree, Oldham, Parmer, Potter, Randall, Roberts, Sherman, Swisher, Throckmorton, Wheeler, Wichita, Wilbarger, Young.
33	Willard A. Johnson	Archer, Armstrong, Bailey, Baylor, Briscoe, Carson, Castro, Childress, Clay, Cochran, Collingsworth, Cottle, Crosby, Dallam, Deaf Smith, Dickens, Donley, Floyd, Foard, Gray, Hale, Hall, Hansford, Hardeman, Hartley, Hemphill, Hockley, Hutchinson, Jack, King, Knox, Lamb, Lipscomb, Lubbock, Moore, Motley, Ochiltree, Oldham, Parmer, Potter, Randall, Roberts, Sherman, Swisher, Throckmorton, Wheeler, Wichita, Wilbarger, Young.
34	Willard A. Johnson	Archer, Armstrong, Bailey, Baylor, Briscoe, Carson, Castro, Childress, Clay, Cochran, Collingsworth, Cottle, Crosby, Dallam, Deaf Smith, Dickens, Donley, Floyd, Foard, Gray, Hale, Hall, Hansford, Hardeman, Hartley, Hemphill, Hockley, Hutchinson, Jack, King, Knox, Lamb, Lipscomb, Lubbock, Moore, Motley, Ochiltree, Oldham, Parmer, Potter, Randall, Roberts, Sherman, Swisher, Throckmorton, Wheeler, Wichita, Wilbarger, Young.
35	Willard A. Johnson	Archer, Armstrong, Bailey, Baylor, Briscoe, Carson, Castro, Childress, Clay, Cochran, Collingsworth, Cottle, Crosby, Dallam, Deaf Smith, Dickens, Donley, Floyd, Foard, Gray, Hale, Hall, Hansford, Hardeman, Hartley, Hemphill, Hockley, Hutchinson, Jack, King, Knox, Lamb, Lipscomb, Lubbock, Moore, Motley, Ochiltree, Oldham, Parmer, Potter, Randall, Roberts, Sherman, Swisher, Throckmorton, Wheeler, Wichita, Wilbarger, Young.
36	William S. Bell; William H. Bledsoe	Archer, Armstrong, Bailey, Baylor, Briscoe, Carson, Castro, Childress, Clay, Cochran, Collingsworth, Cottle, Crosby, Dallam, Deaf Smith, Dickens, Donley, Floyd, Foard, Gray, Hale, Hall, Hansford, Hardeman, Hartley, Hemphill, Hockley, Hutchinson, Jack, King, Knox, Lamb, Lipscomb, Lubbock, Moore, Motley, Ochiltree, Oldham, Parmer, Potter, Randall, Roberts, Sherman, Swisher, Throckmorton, Wheeler, Wichita, Wilbarger, Young.
37	William H. Bledsoe	Archer, Armstrong, Bailey, Baylor, Briscoe, Carson, Castro, Childress, Clay, Cochran, Collingsworth, Cottle, Crosby, Dallam, Deaf Smith, Dickens, Donley, Floyd, Foard, Gray, Hale, Hall, Hansford, Hardeman, Hartley, Hemphill, Hockley, Hutchinson, Jack, King, Knox, Lamb, Lipscomb, Lubbock, Moore, Motley, Ochiltree, Oldham, Parmer, Potter, Randall, Roberts, Sherman, Swisher, Throckmorton, Wheeler, Wichita, Wilbarger, Young.
38	William H. Bledsoe	Archer, Armstrong, Bailey, Baylor, Briscoe, Carson, Castro, Childress, Clay, Cochran, Collingsworth, Cottle, Crosby, Dallam, Deaf Smith, Dickens, Donley, Floyd, Foard, Gray, Hale, Hall, Hansford, Hardeman, Hartley, Hemphill, Hockley, Hutchinson, Jack, King, Knox, Lamb, Lipscomb, Lubbock, Moore, Motley, Ochiltree, Oldham, Parmer, Potter, Randall, Roberts, Sherman, Swisher, Throckmorton, Wheeler, Wichita, Wilbarger, Young.
39	Benjamin F. Berkeley	Brewster, Crane, Crockett, Culberson, Ector, Edwards, El Paso, Glasscock, Hudspeth, Jeff Davis, Kinney, Loving, Maverick, Medina, Midland, Pecos, Presidio, Reagan, Real, Reeves, Sutton, Terrell, Upton, Uvalde, Val Verde, Ward, Winkler.
40	Benjamin F. Berkeley	Brewster, Crane, Crockett, Culberson, Ector, Edwards, El Paso, Glasscock, Hudspeth, Jeff Davis, Kinney, Loving, Maverick, Medina, Midland, Pecos, Presidio, Reagan, Real, Reeves, Sutton, Terrell, Upton, Uvalde, Val Verde, Ward, Winkler.
41	Benjamin F. Berkeley	Brewster, Crane, Crockett, Culberson, Ector, Edwards, El Paso, Glasscock, Hudspeth, Jeff Davis, Kinney, Loving, Maverick, Medina, Midland, Pecos, Presidio, Reagan, Real, Reeves, Sutton, Terrell, Upton, Uvalde, Val Verde, Ward, Winkler.
42	Benjamin F. Berkeley	Brewster, Crane, Crockett, Culberson, Ector, Edwards, El Paso, Glasscock, Hudspeth, Jeff Davis, Kinney, Loving, Maverick, Medina, Midland, Pecos, Presidio, Reagan, Real, Reeves, Sutton, Terrell, Upton, Uvalde, Val Verde, Ward, Winkler.
43	Kenneth M. Regan	Brewster, Crane, Crockett, Culberson, Ector, Edwards, El Paso, Glasscock, Hudspeth, Jeff Davis, Kinney, Loving, Maverick, Medina, Midland, Pecos, Presidio, Reagan, Real, Reeves, Sutton, Terrell, Upton, Uvalde, Val Verde, Ward, Winkler.
44	Kenneth M. Regan	Brewster, Crane, Crockett, Culberson, Ector, Edwards, El Paso, Glasscock, Hudspeth, Jeff Davis, Kinney, Loving, Maverick, Medina, Midland, Pecos, Presidio, Reagan, Real, Reeves, Sutton, Terrell, Upton, Uvalde, Val Verde, Ward, Winkler.
45	Henry L. Winfield	Brewster, Crane, Crockett, Culberson, Ector, Edwards, El Paso, Glasscock, Hudspeth, Jeff Davis, Kinney, Loving, Maverick, Medina, Midland, Pecos, Presidio, Reagan, Real, Reeves, Sutton, Terrell, Upton, Uvalde, Val Verde, Ward, Winkler.
46	Henry L. Winfield	Brewster, Crane, Crockett, Culberson, Ector, Edwards, El Paso, Glasscock, Hudspeth, Jeff Davis, Kinney, Loving, Maverick, Medina, Midland, Pecos, Presidio, Reagan, Real, Reeves, Sutton, Terrell, Upton, Uvalde, Val Verde, Ward, Winkler.
47	Henry L. Winfield	Brewster, Crane, Crockett, Culberson, Ector, Edwards, El Paso, Glasscock, Hudspeth, Jeff Davis, Kinney, Loving, Maverick, Medina, Midland, Pecos, Presidio, Reagan, Real, Reeves, Sutton, Terrell, Upton, Uvalde, Val Verde, Ward, Winkler.
48	Henry L. Winfield	Brewster, Crane, Crockett, Culberson, Ector, Edwards, El Paso, Glasscock, Hudspeth, Jeff Davis, Kinney, Loving, Maverick, Medina, Midland, Pecos, Presidio, Reagan, Real, Reeves, Sutton, Terrell, Upton, Uvalde, Val Verde, Ward, Winkler.
49	Henry L. Winfield	Brewster, Crane, Crockett, Culberson, Ector, Edwards, El Paso, Glasscock, Hudspeth, Jeff Davis, Kinney, Loving, Maverick, Medina, Midland, Pecos, Presidio, Reagan, Real, Reeves, Sutton, Terrell, Upton, Uvalde, Val Verde, Ward, Winkler.
50	Henry L. Winfield	Brewster, Crane, Crockett, Culberson, Ector, Edwards, El Paso, Glasscock, Hudspeth, Jeff Davis, Kinney, Loving, Maverick, Medina, Midland, Pecos, Presidio, Reagan, Real, Reeves, Sutton, Terrell, Upton, Uvalde, Val Verde, Ward, Winkler.
51	Hill D. Hudson	Brewster, Crane, Crockett, Culberson, Ector, Edwards, El Paso, Glasscock, Hudspeth, Jeff Davis, Kinney, Loving, Maverick, Medina, Midland, Pecos, Presidio, Reagan, Real, Reeves, Sutton, Terrell, Upton, Uvalde, Val Verde, Ward, Winkler.
52	Hill D. Hudson	Brewster, Crane, Crockett, Culberson, Ector, Edwards, El Paso, Glasscock, Hudspeth, Jeff Davis, Kinney, Loving, Maverick, Medina, Midland, Pecos, Presidio, Reagan, Real, Reeves, Sutton, Terrell, Upton, Uvalde, Val Verde, Ward, Winkler.
53	James T. Rutherford	Culberson, Ector, El Paso, Hudspeth, Loving, Midland, Reeves, Ward, Winkler.
54	Frank Owen, III	Culberson, Ector, El Paso, Hudspeth, Loving, Midland, Reeves, Ward, Winkler.
55	Frank Owen, III	Culberson, Ector, El Paso, Hudspeth, Loving, Midland, Reeves, Ward, Winkler.
56	Frank Owen, III	Culberson, Ector, El Paso, Hudspeth, Loving, Midland, Reeves, Ward, Winkler.
57	Frank Owen, III	Culberson, Ector, El Paso, Hudspeth, Loving, Midland, Reeves, Ward, Winkler.
58	Frank Owen, III	Culberson, Ector, El Paso, Hudspeth, Loving, Midland, Reeves, Ward, Winkler.
59	Wallace E. "Pete" Snelson	Culberson, Ector, El Paso, Hudspeth, Loving, Midland, Reeves, Ward, Winkler.
60	Joe Christie	Culberson, El Paso, Hudspeth.
61	Joe Christie	Culberson, El Paso, Hudspeth.
62	Joe Christie	Culberson, El Paso, Hudspeth.
63	H. Tati Santiesteban	El Paso, Hudspeth.
64	H. Tati Santiesteban	El Paso, Hudspeth.
65	H. Tati Santiesteban	El Paso, Hudspeth.
66	H. Tati Santiesteban	El Paso, Hudspeth.
67	H. Tati Santiesteban	El Paso, Hudspeth.
68	H. Tati Santiesteban	Portion of El Paso.
69	H. Tati Santiesteban	Portion of El Paso.
70	H. Tati Santiesteban	Portion of El Paso.
71	H. Tati Santiesteban	Portion of El Paso.
72	Peggy Rosson	Portion of El Paso.
73	Peggy Rosson	Portion of El Paso.
74	Peggy Rosson	Portion of El Paso.
75	Eliot Shapleigh	Portion of El Paso.
76	Eliot Shapleigh	Portion of El Paso.
77	Eliot Shapleigh	Portion of El Paso.
78	Eliot Shapleigh	Portion of El Paso.
79	Eliot Shapleigh	Portion of El Paso.
80	Eliot Shapleigh	Portion of El Paso.
81	Eliot Shapleigh	Portion of El Paso.
82	José R. Rodríguez	Portion of El Paso.
83	José R. Rodríguez	Culberson, El Paso, Hudspeth, Jeff Davis, Presidio.
84	José R. Rodríguez	Culberson, El Paso, Hudspeth, Jeff Davis, Presidio.
85	José R. Rodríguez	Culberson, El Paso, Hudspeth, Jeff Davis, Presidio.
86	José R. Rodríguez	Culberson, El Paso, Hudspeth, Jeff Davis, Presidio.
87	Cesar Blanco	Culberson, El Paso, Hudspeth, Jeff Davis, Presidio.
88	Cesar Blanco	All of Culberson, El Paso, Hudspeth, Jeff Davis, Pecos, Presidio, Reeves. Portion of Brewster.
89	Cesar Blanco	All of Culberson, El Paso, Hudspeth, Jeff Davis, Pecos, Presidio, Reeves. Portion of Brewster.
