= Christina Morales =

American politician

Member of the Texas House of Representatives from the 145th district
- Incumbent
- Assumed office March 18, 2019
- Preceded by: Carol Alvarado

Personal details
- Born: April 13, 1968 (age 58) Houston, Texas, U.S.
- Party: Democratic
- Children: 2
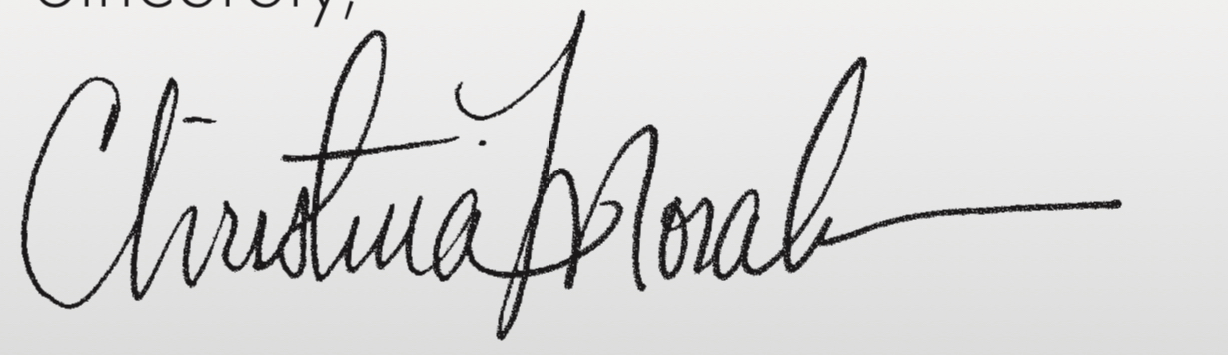
- Signature
- Website: Campaign website

Christina Morales (born April 13, 1968) is a Texas Democratic politician serving in the Texas House of Representatives for district 145.

== Personal life ==
Morales' grandfather, Felix H. Morales, opened KLVL the first Spanish speaking radio station that reported news for the Gulf Coast. At the age of 23, following the death of her grandmother, Morales took over the funeral home ran by the family. Morales has 2 children and 2 twin grandchildren. She is Hispanic.

== Community involvement ==
Morales, in 1997, founded the Annual Morales Back to School Supplies Giveaway. The program helps low income children in Houston get supplies needed for school. Morales is CEO of the program.

== Political career ==
In the spring of 2019, Morales was elected to represent district 145 in the Texas House of Representatives. She was sworn in on March 18, 2019 succeeding Carol Alvarado. Additionally, Morales has been a board member of several organizations. She is affiliated with the Democratic Party.

In 2024, Morales sought the Democratic nomination for Texas's 18th congressional district following the death of Sheila Jackson Lee.
