= Eliot Shapleigh =

American politician

Member of the Texas Senate from the 29th district
- In office January 14, 1997 – January 17, 2011
- Preceded by: Peggy Rosson
- Succeeded by: José R. Rodríguez

Personal details
- Born: November 11, 1952 (age 73) El Paso, Texas
- Party: Democratic
- Education: Rice University, University of Texas
- Profession: Attorney

Eliot Shapleigh (born November 11, 1952) is an American politician. He served in the Texas Senate from 1997 to 2011, from the 29th district, in El Paso County.

== Community involvement ==
=== Unite El Paso ===
In 1992, Shapleigh co-founded an organization called Unite El Paso with other progressive activists. The organization seeks to raise the per capita income in El Paso.

== Texas Senate career ==
=== Legislative record ===
In 2006, Shapleigh authored "Jennifer's Law", a law that permits school districts to award posthumous diplomas to students who die during their senior year of high school. The bill was named after Jennifer Ann Crecente.

=== El Paso Economic Summit ===
Soon thereafter, Shapleigh, County Attorney José Rodriguez, Woody Hunt, Robert Brown, John Montford, and others joined in discussions about how best to establish the medical school and which institution should carry the mission forward. As a result, the Texas Tech University System Board of Regents made establishing a four-year medical school in El Paso an important goal of the System. Over the coming legislative sessions, incremental progress was made in establishing the state's ninth medical school and first since 1977. In 2009, the first new medical students at El Paso's medical school began their studies at the campus. The El Paso Medical School was the first new medical school to be established in the U.S. in 30 years.

=== ASARCO ===
Shapleigh led the opposition to the reopening of an ASARCO-operated copper smelter, which had been located near downtown El Paso since 1887. The smelter, which had been shut down in 1999 due to low copper prices, filed to renew their air permit application with the Texas Commission on Environmental Quality in 2002. Joined by leaders from across the three-state, two-nation region, Shapleigh and hundreds of activists from El Paso, Juarez, and New Mexico placed pressure on the corporation to justify putting over 7,000 tons of new pollutants into El Paso's air. After eight years, the TCEQ Commissioners granted the permit on a 3-0 vote. The Environmental Protection Agency soon intervened, however, citing deficiencies with the permitting process and ASARCO's air control equipment. As a result, ASARCO announced that the El Paso smelter would not reopen. As of July 2009, it appears the smelter property will be placed in an environmental remediation trust so that it may be cleaned up using funding obtained via ASARCO's bankruptcy.

== Political future ==
Shapleigh announced on October 16, 2009, that he would not run for re-election in 2010. When asked if he will run for another office, he indicated that he is undecided, though suggested he would not run for Congress. State Senator Juan Hinojosa suggested that Shapleigh might run for governor.

== Election history ==
Election history of District 29 from 1992.

=== Most recent election ===
==== 2006 ====
Texas general election, 2006: Senate District 29
Party	Candidate	Votes	%	±%
Republican	Donald R. “Dee” Margo	36,127	41.21	+41.21
Democratic	Eliot Shapleigh (Incumbent)	51,531	58.79	−41.21
Majority		15,404	17.57	−82.43
Turnout		87,658		+19.74
Democratic hold				

=== Previous elections ===
==== 2002 ====
Texas general election, 2002: Senate District 29
Party	Candidate	Votes	%	±%
Democratic	Eliot Shapleigh (Incumbent)	73,205	100.00	0.00
Majority		73,205	100.00	0.00
Turnout		73,205		−27.55
Democratic hold				

==== 2000 ====
Texas general election, 2000: Senate District 29
Party	Candidate	Votes	%	±%
Democratic	Eliot Shapleigh (Incumbent)	101,045	100.00	+26.28
Majority		101,045	100.00	+52.55
Turnout		101,045		−17.11
Democratic hold				

==== 1996 ====
Texas general election, 1996: Senate District 29
Party	Candidate	Votes	%	±%
Republican	Randy Berry	32,029	26.28	+26.28
Democratic	Eliot Shapleigh	89,868	73.72	−26.28
Majority		57,839	47.45	−52.55
Turnout		121,897		+89.85
Democratic hold				

Democratic primary runoff, 1996: Senate District 29
Candidate		Votes	%	±
✓	Eliot Shapleigh	24,666	61.82	+26.30
	Hector Villa	15,235	38.18	+18.70
Majority		9,431	23.64	
Turnout		39,901		

Democratic primary, 1996: Senate District 29
Candidate		Votes	%	±
	Ray Mancera	8,672	17.38	
	Rene Nunez	5,758	11.54	
✓	Eliot Shapleigh	17,723	35.52	
	Marie Tarvin-Garland	8,017	16.07	
✓	Hector Villa	9,722	19.49	
Turnout		49,892		

== Notes ==
Texas Senate
Preceded by Peggy Rosson	Texas State Senator from District 29 (El Paso); 1997-2011	Succeeded by José R. Rodríguez
