= List of video game podcasts =

The following is a list of video game podcasts.

== List ==
Podcast	Year	Starring, Narrator(s), or Host(s)	Produced by	Ref
The Game Deflators	2019–Present	John and Ryan	Independent	
The 1UP Show	2005–2009	Jane Pinckard, Ryan O'Donnell, and Che Chou	1Up Network	
GFW Radio	2006–2008	Jeff Green and Shawn Elliott	1Up Network	
Podcast Beyond	2007–present	Max Scoville and Brian Altano	IGN	
Kinda Funny Podcast	2013–present	Greg Miller, Tim Gettys, Nick Scarpino, and Andy Cortez	Independent	
Game Scoop!	2006–present	Daemon Hatfield and Justin Davis	IGN	
Gamertag Radio	2005–present	Danny Peña, Peter Toledo and Parris Lilly	AudioBoom	
Spawn On Me with Kahlief Adams	2016–present	Kahlief Adams	Independent (Formerly Fanbyte)	
Triple Click	2020–present	Kirk Hamilton, Maddy Myers, and Jason Schreier	Maximum Fun	
Filthy Casuals	2015–present	Tommy Dassalo, Ben Vernel and Adam Knox	Independent	
What's Good Games	2017–2024	Andrea Rene, Brittney Brombacher and Kristine Steimer	Independent	
Wizard and the Bruiser				
Game Query	2019–present		Independent	
Retronauts	2006–present	Jeremy Parish and Bob Mackey	Independent	
Get Played	2019–present	Heather Anne Campbell, Nick Wiger, and Matt Apodaca	Earwolf	
The Daily Fortnite Show	2020–present		Anchor	
Giant Bombcast	2008–present		Independent	
The Game Informer Show	2009–present	Alex Stadnik, Alex Van Aken, and Kyle Hilliard	Game Informer	
Waypoint Radio	2016–2023	Austin Walker, Rob Zacny, Patrick Klepek, Natalie Watson, Chia Contreras, and Renata Price	Vice	
Massively Overpowered Podcast	2015–present	Justin Olivetti	Independent	
Major Nelson Radio	2011–present	Major Nelson	Microsoft	
The Noobology Podcast	2020	Mav & Ash	Independent	
8-4 Play	2010–present	Mark MacDonald, John Ricciardi, Hiroko Minamoto, Justin Epperson, Roy Blakely, Sarah Podzorski, and Graeme Howard	Independent	
The Easy Allies Podcast	2016–present	Brandon Jones, Kyle Bosman, Isla Hink, Daniel Bloodworth, Michael Huber, Don Casanova	Independent	
Cane and Rinse	2011–present		Cane and Rinse	
Nintendo Power	2017–2023		Nintendo	
The 1099	2015–present	Josiah Renaudin	Independent	
The Heroine’s Journey				
Sound of Play	2015–present	Leon Cox	Cane and Rinse	
Not A Game	2013–2016	Tom Hatfield	Independent	
The Brainy Gamer Podcast	2008–2013	Michael Abbott	Independent	
Bits N' Bricks	2020-2023	Brian Crecente and Ethan Vincent		
Remap Radio	2023–present	Rob Zacny, Patrick Klepek, and Ricardo Contreras	Independent	
Nintendo Voice Chat	2008–present		IGN	
The MinnMax Show	2019–present	Ben Hanson, Kyle Hilliard, Jacob Geller, Sarah Podzorski, Haley MacLean, Jeff Marchiafava, Janet Garcia, Kelsey Lewin and Leo Vader	Independent	
Nextlander	2021–present	Vinny Caravella, Brad Shoemaker and Alex Navarro	Independent	
No Small Games	2023–present	Emily Merritt and Kate Hunter	Independent	
