= List of The Eric Andre Show episodes =

The Eric Andre Show is an American late-night talk show hosted by Eric André and formerly co-starring Hannibal Buress and Blannibal (played by James Hazley) for Cartoon Network's late night programming block, Adult Swim. The series parodies low-budget public-access talk shows. It premiered on May 20, 2012, in the United States on Adult Swim. A total of 63 episodes have aired over the course of the show's six seasons; additionally, a live 27-minute special titled "The Eric Andre New Year's Eve Spooktacular" aired on December 31, 2012. A second special titled "Eric Andre Does Paris" aired on February 18, 2018.

== Series overview ==
Season	Episodes	Originally released	
Season	Episodes	First released	Last released
Pilot		unaired	
1	10 (+1 special)	May 20, 2012	July 29, 2012; December 31, 2012 (special)
2	10	October 3, 2013	December 12, 2013
3	10	November 6, 2014	January 23, 2015
4	10 (+1 special)	August 5, 2016	October 14, 2016; February 18, 2018 (special)
5	10 (+1 special)	October 25, 2020	November 22, 2020; November 13, 2020 (special)
6	10	June 4, 2023	July 2, 2023

== Episodes ==
=== Pilot (2009) ===
Concerned that the show could not be sold on the script alone, André with co-host Hannibal Buress and directors Andrew Barchilon and Kitao Sakurai filmed a pilot episode, titled "Duh Air Ache On Dre Shoe," in 2009. Keith Crofford of Adult Swim said in 2013 that, on seeing the pilot, making the show "was pretty much a no-brainer from there."

=== Season 1 (2012) ===
For season 1, Andrew Barchilon and Kitao Sakurai are directors for all episodes; Eric André is the sole writer for all episodes as well. The show is played in a 4:3 aspect ratio.

No. overall	No. in season	Title	Original release date	US viewers (millions)
1	1	"George Clooney"	May 20, 2012	N/A
Eric begins the show without any idea of what to do. Eric and Hannibal play "This or That". Eric introduces two accidentally double-booked musical guest bands: the Los Angeles indie dreampop group Modern Time Machines, and the hardcore band Retaliate; both bands proceed to perform songs simultaneously onstage. Guests: George Clooney (David Haskin), Dolph Lundgren; Stand-up Comedy Performance by: George Clooney (David Haskin); Musical guests: Modern Time Machines and Retaliate; Sketches: Trash Can Scare, Civil War Reenactment, "Touch a Stranger's Hand" Day
2	2	"Rick Fox"	May 27, 2012	0.58
Eric and Hannibal talk about their feelings in the "Halfway Point of the Show". Eric presents "Wacky Newspaper Articles". Eric loses his memory temporally during a skit and later finds writing on his body. Guests: Russell Brand (Semere Etmet), Rick Fox, juggler Geoff Rahzs; Stand-up Comedy Performance by: Kristanna Loken; Musical guests: Air guitar champions Jeff Allen and Vernon Courteaux; Sketches: The Cat Burglar, Awkward Sexy Hot-Dog, Nudist Tennis, Catching a Pizza
3	3	"Tatyana Ali"	June 3, 2012	0.79
Eric and Hannibal perform a musical opening. The ShamWow! creator cancels his guest interview so Hannibal and Eric talk about supporting troops, their bands and "Scat Autotune". Guests: Tatyana Ali, Doc Chicken, Arnold Schwarzenegger (Bruce Vilanch); Musical guest: Shirley Temple (Joyce Geronimus); Sketches: Thomas Jefferson, Shot in the Street, Tea Party Meeting, "What do you think of The Eric Andre Show?", Eric on the Street
4	4	"Brandi Glanville"	June 10, 2012	0.78
Eric quits his opening monologue to make out with a girl in the crew. Eric presents "Top 1 List". A political pianist (Mark Russell) interrupts an interview. Guests: Brandi Glanville, Joe Biden (portrayed by a roast duck hanging on a string), Paul Tsongas (portrayed by a package of cheese hanging on a string); Stand-up Comedy Performance by: TP Pitchfork Bolger; Musical guests: Lisa Stanley and Killer Mike; Sketches: Breaking News / Hannibal Buress, ESQ., Swimsuit model, Werewolf Basketball, Agnostic Preacher
5	5	"Reese Witherspoon"	June 17, 2012	0.87
Hannibal advises Eric about what to do with his life. Guests: Reese Witherspoon (Kyle Bostic), Maxi, Dr. Drew Ordon; Stand-up Comedy Performance by: Tony Lam; Musical guest: Mr. Muthafuckin' eXquire; Sketches: Nudist bowling, The Hannibal Minute, Petition to Killing Whales, Reverse Streaking
6	6	"Sinbad"	June 24, 2012	0.84
Hannibal performs the opening monologue in Eric's temporary absence. Guests: Sinbad, The Incredible Hulk (Sun Jae Kim); Stand-up Comedy Performance by: Jerry Seinfeld (Wilson Ugwu); Musical guest: Savion Glover (Josh Fadem); Sketches: Public Bong Rips, Metal Detector, Eric slimed, Star Wars Street Preacher, Six Breasts, "What do you think of The Eric Andre Show?"
7	7	"J-Moe"	July 8, 2012	0.79
Dave Koz joins Eric's house band. Eric tries to lip-sync his monologue. Eric presents "What if it was Purple?". Lorenzo Lamas is tortured by Eric and Hannibal through the episode. Pete Wentz makes a PSA about buckle-up. Guest: J-Moe; Musical guests: Girls skipping rope (Ariyonna Augustine, Alissa Jefferson, Leeta Jefferson, and Adjoa Marley); Sketches: Searching mom, Mensa Convention, Mensa Convention After-Party, Interviewing Robert Forster, American Drugs
8	8	"Evangelos"	July 15, 2012	0.70
Eric starts the show typing into a laptop (Sex and the City style), until pop-up images of Hannibal in drag causes him to wreck the set. Eric sings how is the feeling of having a TV Show. Hannibal disappears during a segment. Guests: Jay-Z (Huynh Quang), Beyoncé (Beverly Swanson); Stand-up Comedy Performance by: Evangelos; Musical guests: Eden Wood and Evangelos; Sketches: E'Rickshawing, "What do you think of The Eric Andre Show?" Homeless Eric, The Pickup Artist
9	9	"Jack"	July 22, 2012	0.86
A Hannibal Angel and a Hannibal Demon try to persuade Eric to "do whatever". Eric tries to predict his mail. Eric feeds the crew at lunchtime. Paul Littleston, the street correspondent, walks alone and capsizes a kayak. Guests: Jack Nicholson (Joe Richards), a grizzly bear Musical guests: Devendra Banhart and the Funky Bunch (Rodney J. Hobbs, Mark Anthony Williams); Sketches: Going to the Sperm Bank, Flutist Andre, Eric on the Street, Porn in Public
10	10	"Ryan Phillippe"	July 29, 2012	0.84
Hannibal becomes insane playing the lead guitar in the band. After the show Eric has an existential crisis, dying in 2028. Guests: Ryan Phillippe, Russell Brand (Semere Etmet) will.i.am (Neil Charles); Musical guests: Eric André, Spencer Seim, Pete Newsom; Sketches: Who Can Hold the Most Babies?, Shot in the Street, Eric on a Tree, Stabby Face, The Death Of Eric Andre
Special
–	–	"The Eric Andre New Year's Eve Spooktacular"	December 31, 2012	0.58
Various correspondents report in from street corners and various countries throughout. André performs a special New Year's opening monologue. André performs later orders a moment of silence for hostages, followed by a moment of blindness for all the cool hostages, before starting the countdown for Rosh Hashanah. The band performs "Auld Lang Syne" as crowd starts a celebratory riot after the countdown to 12:06 a.m. The crew members reveal themselves to be Mayans, who take André to be sacrificed, while the riot continues uninterrupted, ending the special. Guests: Demi Lovato, Omarosa Manigault, Kevin Sorbo, Sebastian Bach, Rory Scovel, John Kricfalusi, Camilla Poindexter; several football players and cheerleaders from the "Super Bowl Spectacular"; Sketches: The Top Ten Things of 2012, The Luther Vandross Wheel

=== Season 2 (2013) ===
Andrew Barchilon and Kitao Sakurai are directors for all episodes for season 2. Similarly, Eric André, Hannibal Buress, Andrew Barchilon, Kitao Sakurai, Dan Curry, Doug Lussenhop, Erica Oyama, Kevin Barnett, Tommy Blacha, Rory Scovel, Jesse Elias, and Eric Moneypenny have written all episodes of the season as well. The aspect ratio of the show is 16:9.

No. overall	No. in season	Title	Original release date	US viewers (millions)
11	1	"Maria Menounos; Eric Balfour"	October 3, 2013	1.00
The show enters to a new format in High Definition. Eric starts a campaign to stop Gwyneth Paltrow in his monologue. Guests: Maria Menounos, Eric Balfour; Musical guests: Irontom; Sketches: Sign Spinning, Drunk Statue of Liberty, Buying a Hotdog in a White Suit
12	2	"Krysten Ritter; Dominic Monaghan"	October 10, 2013	0.93
Eric taunts Hannibal in the monologue. "Wacky Newspaper Articles" goes really wrong. Guests: Krysten Ritter, Dominic Monaghan; Musical guest: Brian McKnight; Sketches: Officer Andre Parking Enforcement, Ghostbusters, Hannibal's Pretzels, Honey Time Bee Pollen
13	3	"Lou Ferrigno; Downtown Julie Brown"	October 17, 2013	0.99
Eric is forced by the producer to kiss a mannequin. Eric and Hannibal are cloned and talk about methaphores and coffee. Guests: Lou Ferrigno, The Incredible Hulk (Sun Jae Kim), Downtown Julie Brown; Sketches: Wall Street Investor, Blind Man, Harry's Car Place
14	4	"Jodie Sweetin; Vivica A. Fox"	October 24, 2013	1.31
Eric begins the show without the band. An armed man tries to kill Eric. Guests: George Clooney (David Haskin), Jodie Sweetin, Vivica A. Fox; Sketches: Ranch it Up!, M&Ms on the Subway, Lost Riot Control Officer
15	5	"James Van Der Beek; Steve-O"	October 31, 2013	0.98
T-Pain joins the band through the episode. Lindsay Lohan is in the news. Chef Rory Scovel shows his cooking skills. Guests: James Van Der Beeks (himself and Matt Weis), Steve-O; Sketches: Officer Eric Needs Help, Cyclops Photographer, City Council Meeting
16	6	"Wink Martindale; Sarah Burns"	November 7, 2013	1.27
Hannibal is killed and no one knows who did it. Guests: Wink Martindale, Sarah Burns; Musical guest: Fredro Starr; Sketches: Bird Up!, Toothpaste Street Advertiser, Skydiver
17	7	"Lance Reddick; Harry Shum Jr."	November 14, 2013	1.17
Eric destroys the set in reverse and claims everything is in the news. Russell Brand (Semere Etmet) interviews women in the Gracie Awards Red Carpet. Guests: Lance Reddick, Harry Shum Jr. Musical guest: Jonwayne; Sketches: Ferry Captain, Mac Repairing
18	8	"Joey Fatone; Richard Hatch"	November 21, 2013	0.92
An evil presence hides in the set. Eric presents "Hannibal's Hands". Eric and Hannibal play "Buzzers". Guests: Joey Fatone, Richard Hatch; Musical guest: Eric Kelly; Sketches: Destructive Bartender, "Do you know how to get to the hospital?", Squirt of Gas, Mattress Shopping
19	9	"Chance the Rapper; Mel B"	December 5, 2013	0.88
Questlove joins to the band through the episode, but soon gets lost and finds his father. Eric performs a peace surf music song with south koreans and Russell Brand (Semere Etmet). Guests: Chance the Rapper, Evangelos, Wyatt Cenac, Mel B, Jordan Carlos; Musical guests: Curren$y and Henry Rollins; Sketches: Birthday Cake Centaur, Black Scientologists, You Broke My Laptop, Merry Christmas from The Eric Andre Show
20	10	"Scott Porter; Brutus "The Barber" Beefcake"	December 12, 2013	0.83
Eric begins a destructive rampage through all the episode with the help of Gene Hoglan, Blake Anderson, Paul Littleson, Tom Green and The Iron Sheik. Guests: Gallagher, Lindsay Lohan (uncredited impersonator), Brutus "The Barber" Beefcake, Prof. Ric Shaffran, Crips, L.A. Beast, Kato Kaelin, Jay; Musical guests: Scott Porter, Samba Dancers and Krumpers; Sketches: Punch a Stranger's Face Day, Eric on the Street

=== Season 3 (2014–15) ===
No. overall	No. in season	Title	Original release date	US viewers (millions)
21	1	"Seth Rogen; Asa Akira"	November 6, 2014	0.87
Eric begins the Season Three with a brand new haircut inspired on Katt Williams. Guests: Seth Rogen, Asa Akira; Musical guests: Exhumed and The Supremes (uncredited impersonators); Sketches: Smoothie Time, Eric on the Street, Art Gallery, Salad Man, Finder's Keepers
22	2	"Lauren Conrad; Reese Witherspoon"	November 13, 2014	0.97
Eric and Hannibal get physical transformations for the auditions of Dallas Buyers Club 2 and Precious 2. Eric and Hannibal talk about the invention of ladders. Using a trope inspired by Alejandro Jodorowsky's movie The Holy Mountain, Hannibal shoots a blindfolded Eric with a long-barreled revolver, creating a hole out of which a live bird flies. Guests: Lauren Conrad, Reese Witherspoon (Kyle Bostic), James Adomian; Musical guest: Hannibal Buress; Sketches: Bird Up!, Handcuffed, "How Do You Explain This?", Team Go!, Dalmatian
23	3	"Ryan Kwanten; Beyoncé & Jay-Z"	November 20, 2014	1.13
Eric and the band turn the monologue into a nu metal song. Guests: Ryan Kwanten, Jay-Z (Huynh Quang), Beyoncé (Beverly Swanson); Musical guests: Jay-Z (Huynh Quang), Beyoncé Knowles (Beverly Swanson), Killer Mike and Action Bronson; Sketches: Pizza Safety, Google Robot, Officer Andre
24	4	"Jillian Barberie; Victor Ortiz"	November 27, 2014	1.10
Eric gets some plastic surgeries. Kraft Punk presents his new hidden camera show: Kraft Punk'd. Guests: Jillian Barberie, Victor Ortiz; Musical guest: Mac DeMarco; Sketches: Ranch It Up!, Patients Dueling, Kraft Punk'd, The Spideric Andre Show
25	5	"The Hannibal Buress Show"	December 4, 2014	1.06
Hannibal hosts the show after Eric suffers irreversible spine damage. Hannibal wins the Best Comedy Talk Show Host Award. Hannibal presents "Hannibal Bustin' Through" and "I'm Hannibal". Guests: Nick Cannon, Carmen Electra; Musical guest: Big Jon; Sketches: Bus Driver Hannibal Needs Help, Elijah Cookie Muhammad, Hannibal Bustin' Through, Officer Hannibal Serves, Barber Shop, Safety Stegosaurus
26	6	"Wiz Khalifa; Aubrey Peeples"	December 11, 2014	1.35
Wiz Khalifa and Aubrey Peeples are interviewed. Sketches: Elephant Capture, I'm a Potato, Eric on the Street, Time for Some Ranch!, Jacking Off (musical outro)
27	7	"Naturi Naughton; Ryan Phillippe"	December 18, 2014	1.02
Naturi Naughton and Ryan Phillippe are interviewed. Trash Talk performs. Sketches: Fruit Loops, Do You Believe in Society's Lies?, Drunk Officer Eric, Santa Claus Assault
28	8	"Jimmy Kimmel; Tyler The Creator"	January 9, 2015	1.17
Jimmy Kimmel and Tyler, the Creator are interviewed. Health performs. Sketches: Seinfeld, Ranch!, Bird Up!
29	9	"Pauly D; Rick Springfield"	January 16, 2015	1.15
Pauly D and Rick Springfield are interviewed and Paul "Roald Dahl" Wall performs. Andy Samberg, Lupe Fiasco, Scoop DeVille, and Andrew W.K. guest star. Sketches: Cop Car Smash, Bad Mailman, Street Suitcase, Werewolf, Fat Cops
30	10	"Bird Up!"	January 23, 2015	1.14
Stephen Colletti is interviewed. Chris Rock makes a guest appearance.

=== Season 4 (2016–18) ===
No. overall	No. in season	Title	Original release date	US viewers (millions)
31	1	"T.I.; Abby Lee Miller"	August 5, 2016	1.19
T.I. and Abby Lee Miller are interviewed. American Authors perform. Sketches: Cupcake Challenge, Sprite Sponsorship, Horsin' Around, Corporate Motivation
32	2	"Stacey Dash; Jack McBrayer"	August 12, 2016	1.08
Stacey Dash and Jack McBrayer are interviewed. Danny Brown, ASAP Rocky, Nocando (Open Mike Eagle) and Go Dreamer perform. Sketches: Blind in Lightbulb Shop, Ranch It Up!, Eric on the Street, Chinese Food Underground, Rapper Warrior Ninja.
33	3	"Howie Mandel; Malaysia Pargo"	August 19, 2016	1.07
Howie Mandel and Malaysia Pargo are interviewed. Flying Lotus performs. Sketches: Cyber Arrest, Kraft Dunk'd, Mike Penis, Protein Shake
34	4	"Tichina Arnold; Steve Schirripa"	August 26, 2016	1.01
Tichina Arnold and Steve Schirripa are interviewed. Ariel Pink performs. Travis Barker guest stars. Sketches: Parking Enforcement, Erics on the Street, Army Recruiter
35	5	"Jesse Williams; Jillian Michaels"	September 9, 2016	0.90
Jesse Williams and Jillian Michaels are interviewed. OG Maco and Tim Janus perform. Penn Jillette makes a guest appearance. Sketches: Grocery Goofs, Ranch It Up!, Eric's Car Place, Hostage TV
36	6	"Warren G; Kelly Osbourne"	September 16, 2016	1.20
Warren G and Kelly Osbourne are interviewed. Jim Norton performs. Tony Hawk makes a guest appearance. Sketches: My Alien Dad, The Kraftlor, Baby Balloon, Paramedic Sex Revive
37	7	"Raymond Cruz; Amber Rose"	September 23, 2016	1.01
Raymond Cruz and Amber Rose are interviewed. Thundercat performs. Sketches: MacDonald, Ranch It Up!, Mailman Eric
38	8	"Chris Jericho; Roy Hibbert; Flavor Flav"	September 30, 2016	1.14
Chris Jericho, Roy Hibbert and Flavor Flav are interviewed. Sketches: Sprite Sponsorship, Bed Bugs Kill, Judge Andre, Yoga in the Park
39	9	"Dennis Rodman; Haley Joel Osment"	October 7, 2016	1.11
Dennis Rodman and Haley Joel Osment are interviewed. David Alan Grier and Alan Thicke perform. Sketches: Ranch It Up!, Falcon, I Am The Octopus
40	10	"Jack Black; Jennette McCurdy"	October 14, 2016	1.14
Jack Black and Jennette McCurdy are interviewed. 311 performs. T-Pain makes a guest appearance. Sketches: Time To Deliver A Pizza Ball, Injured Worker, Dreamwerks Trailer, EZ Breeze Airport Shuttles
Special
–	–	"Eric Andre Does Paris"	February 18, 2018	0.77
Eric André goes around Paris interviewing people, and also visits Africa, Paris. Sketches: Naked Croissant Eater, Eiffel Tower Interviews, Paris Style Run, Eric In Africa Paris, Suspenseful Trailer, Notre Dame Street Interviews, Lovers TV and Finding Hitler's Bones.

=== Season 5 (2020) ===
No. overall	No. in season	Title	Original release date	U.S. viewers (millions)
41	1	"A King Is Born"	October 25, 2020	0.21
Judy Greer and Adam Rippon are interviewed. Anderson Paak performs. Sketches: Ranch It Up!, Rat Ti-Tee Rat Rat, Officer Andre Store Security, Sprite Bike Trick
42	2	"Hannibal Quits"	October 25, 2020	0.22
Hannibal Buress quits the show and is replaced by a mutant clone of himself called Blannibal (played by rock musician James Hazley). Saweetie and Shanola Hampton are interviewed. MadeinTYO, Pi'erre Bourne, Jasper Dolphin and Taco Bennett performs. Danny Brown and Talib Kweli make an appearance. Sketches: Lexivan, Fartsplosion, Pushed Out Of Plane, Rapper Warrior Ninja.
43	3	"You Got Served"	November 1, 2020	0.28
Omarion and Tyler Henry are interviewed. Machine Gun Kelly performs. Macaulay Culkin and Lamorne Morris make guest appearances. Sketches: Bench Mensch, Ranch It Up!, Window Cleaners, Fartsplosion
44	4	"Lizzo Up"	November 1, 2020	0.27
Dermot Mulroney and Diane Guerrero are interviewed. Joey Badass performs. Wale, Lizzo and "Weird Al" Yankovic make guest appearances. Sketches: Wheatpaster, Bird Up! (Lizzo), Street Report with Eric Andre, Eric In The Street
45	5	"The ASAP Ferg Show"	November 8, 2020	0.44
Mercedes Javid and Brenda Song are interviewed. Grimes performs while on a torture device. John Cena, Levar Burton, ASAP Ferg and Lil Nas X make guest appearances. Sketches: Ranch It Up!, Psychic Reading, Last Day As A Hasid, Hostage TV
46	6	"Blannibal Quits"	November 8, 2020	0.40
Blannibal quits the show as the same way as Hannibal. Eric tries to clone him but it fails. Tiffany Pollard and Naya Rivera are interviewed. Big Freedia and Lil' Freedia (Ali Chapman) performs. Lakeith Stanfield makes his debut as an occasional co-host and Roy Choi make a guest appearance. Sketches: Penis Caught In A Spoke, Pushed Out Of Boat, Officer Andre Horse Cop NOTE: This episode marks Naya Rivera's final television appearance before her death in July 2020, and is dedicated to her memory.
47	7	"Named After My Dad's Penis"	November 15, 2020	0.32
Felipe Esparza co-stars by himself for the first time. Luis Guzmán and Tia Carrere are interviewed. JPEGMafia, Lil Yachty, Murs, Zack Fox, and Trippie Redd perform. Sketches: The Avocado Effect, The Nostradamus Report, Undercover Homeless Guy, Mike P, Rapper Warrior Ninja.
48	8	"Bone TV"	November 15, 2020	0.28
Robin Givens, Cleopatra Coleman and Jai Rodriguez are interviewed. Toro y Moi performs. Sketches: Prisoner From Hospital, Bone TV, Trash On Law
49	9	"Is Your Wife Still Depressed?"	November 22, 2020	0.35
Quincy and Chad Johnson are interviewed. Fat Tony, Freddie Gibbs, OG Swaggerdick and Cuco perform. Adam Conover, Trinidad James and Steve-O make guest appearances. Sketches: Mike P, Ranch It Up!, Hawk Takes Baby, Rapper Warrior Ninja.
50	10	"The 50th Episode!"	November 22, 2020	0.33
Blake Griffin and Stormy Daniels are interviewed. Hannibal Buress returns for a brief appearance at the end of the episode. Sketches: Crossing Guard, Ranch It Up!, The Alfredo Effect, The Pageant
Special
–	–	"The Making of Season Five"	November 13, 2020	0.40
A look at the behind the scenes of season 5.

=== Season 6 (2023) ===
No. overall	No. in season	Title	Original release date	U.S. viewers (millions)
51	1	"Bugs Weekly"	June 5, 2023	0.18
Lil Nas X and Karrueche Tran are interviewed. Denzel Curry performs. 'Sketches:Bust Me Nugs, Beer, Bug Issue, Coroner
52	2	"Jaleel Blanco"	June 5, 2023	0.18
Mia Khalifa and Jaleel White are interviewed. Sketches: Goober Driver, Hapless EMT, Street Statue Fight.
53	3	"Rim the Reaper"	June 12, 2023	0.16
Jon Hamm and Blac Chyna are interviewed. Sketches: Eric In Class, Priest Pleasure, House Sellers U.S.A.
54	4	"Football Is Back"	June 12, 2023	0.14
Tinashe and Chuck Liddell are interviewed. Waka Flocka Flame performs. Sam Jay makes a guest appearance. Sketches: Google Robot, Grocery Goofs, Sprite Skydiver.
55	5	"Woodchipper Hijinks"	June 19, 2023	0.17
Chanel West Coast and Donald Glover are interviewed. Buddy makes a guest appearance. Sketches: No Parking, Woodchipper Hijinks.
56	6	"Don't You Say a Word"	June 19, 2023	0.15
Chet Hanks and Natasha Lyonne are interviewed. Diplo performs. Drew Barrymore makes a guest appearance. Sketches: Wig Undercover, Leaking Box, House Sellers U.S.A.
57	7	"Anti-Weed"	June 26, 2023	0.14
Raven-Symoné and Benny Blanco are interviewed. Kumail Nanjiani and Kitao Sakurai make guest appearances. Ho99o9 performs. Sketches: Ranch It Up!, Kumail's Kar Kwash, Officer Down, Haunted Temp Worker
58	8	"Old Yeller"	June 26, 2023	0.10
Jaden Smith and Chloe Cherry are interviewed. The Chainsmokers perform. Sketches: Sprite Gender Reveal, House Sellers U.S.A., Amazon Drivers
59	9	"Krft Punk Returns"	July 3, 2023	N/A
Lil Yachty is interviewed. Rico Nasty performs. Sketches: Aquarium Fishing, Child Bus Crash, Wheelchair Accident
60	10	"The Cold Episode"	July 3, 2023	N/A
Meagan Good and Daymond John are interviewed. Cypress Hill performs. Sketches: A/C Repair, Elevator Surprise Party, Storage Unit Scavengers

== Specials ==
In addition to The Eric Andre New Years Eve Spooktacular and Eric Andre Does Paris, several other specials have been made by Adult Swim starring Eric André. These are not considered regular episodes of the show, but do contain The Eric Andre Show branding.

No.	Title	Original release date	US viewers (millions)
1	"Eric at the RNC"	July 22, 2016	—
Eric André visits the 2016 Republican National Convention.
2	"RNC: Freedom Girls"	July 22, 2016	—
Eric André and Dan Curry report from the Republican National Convention.
3	"Eric Near the DNC"	July 29, 2016	—
Eric André attempts to visit the 2016 Democratic National Convention.
4	"Eric Andre Interviews The Hot Babes of Instagram: Lindsey Pelas"	February 13, 2017	—
Eric André interviews Lindsey Pelas
5	"Eric Andre Interviews The Hot Babes of Instagram: Ana Montana"	February 14, 2017	—
Eric André interviews Ana Montana
6	"Eric Andre Interviews The Hot Babes of Instagram: Carissa Rosario"	February 15, 2017	—
Eric André interviews Carissa Rosario
7	"Eric Andre Interviews The Hot Babes of Instagram: Jennifer Lee"	February 16, 2017	—
Eric André interviews Jennifer Lee
8	"Eric Andre Interviews The Hot Babes of Instagram: Deborah Lee"	February 17, 2017	—
Eric André interviews Deborah Lee

=== Spin-off (2019) ===
Title	Directed by	Written by	Original release date
"KRFT Punk's Political Party"	Eric Notarnicola	Dan Curry	March 8, 2019
Kraft Punk interview political personalities. Guests: Birther Bryan Black, flat-earther Aaron Krieshok, conspiracy theorist filmmaker Dylan Avery, libertarian political activist and rapper Nickolas Wildstar, Ashlee Marie Preston, Rachel Dolezal, ex-The Apprentice candidate Erin Elmore, Lucien Greaves, right-wing activist Arthur C. Schaper, Peace and Freedom party candidate John Thompson Parker and Bill Donohue.
