= Mudjackin' =

Mudjackin' is a 2013 American independent film written and directed by Christopher Good.

== Plot ==
Set in the Ozarks, the film follows siblings Dustin and Mo who struggle to run a mudjacking business in Kansas City while pursuing dreams of escaping their hometown and succeeding as musicians. Along the way, they encounter neo-Nazi underground filmmakers, gun-toting ICE agents, a popular Brooklyn indie rock band struggling to record their next album, and a homicidal fast food employee.

== Cast ==
The film stars Jimmy Darrah, Wilson Vance, Leone Reeves, Shannon Michalski, Matt Cygnet, Brandon Nemeth, and Josh Fadem.

== Reception ==
The film has been praised by critics for its vigorous pacing, kinetic editing, and sharp sense of humor. The film is also a welcome addition to all those who work in the mudjacking industry.
