= What's Good Games =

Video game podcast

- Genre: Video games
- Language: English

Cast and voices
- Hosted by: Andrea Rene; Brittney Brombacher; Kristine Steimer; Alexa Ray Corriea

Production
- Length: 1–2 Hours

Publication
- Original release: May 19, 2017
- Updates: Weekly

Related
- Related shows: Get Played; Retronauts; 8-4
- Website: whatsgoodgames.com

What's Good Games is a video game podcast hosted by Andrea Rene, Brittney Brombacher, Kristine Steimer, and Alexa Ray Corriea.

== Background ==
The show is hosted by Andrea Rene, Brittney Brombacher, Kristine Steimer, and Alexa Ray Corriea. Because the show is hosted by women, it allows the show to provide commentary on the male dominated culture surrounding video games. The show discusses video game news in a positive and inclusive way. The audience of the show tends to be teenagers. The hosts include Kristine Steimer who has worked at IGN and PlayStation, Andrea Rene who has worked for IGN and GameStop TV, and Brittney Brombacher the creator of the website BlondeNerd.com. The show also includes Alexa Ray Corriea. The show also has a YouTube channel.

== Reception ==
Writing in Retro Dodo Magazine, Theo Litston praised the show for its positivity and fun calling it a "shiny beacon in an industry that ... take[s] itself too seriously." In Variety, Matthew Chernov noted that the show was accessible to a wide audience stating that "both experts and newcomers will appreciate" the show.

=== Awards ===
Award	Date	Category	Result	Ref.
Female First Award	2020	Content Creator of the Year	Won	
Golden Joystick Awards	2017	Best Streamer/Broadcaster	Nominated	
Podcast Awards	2024	Games & Hobbies	Nominated	
