= Ashlee Marie Preston =

American media personality, producer, and activist

- Born: June 7, 1984 (age 41); Louisville, Kentucky, U.S.
- Known for: American media personality, journalist, and activist.

Ashlee Marie Preston is an American media personality, journalist, activist, the first trans woman to become editor-in-chief of a national publication, Wear Your Voice Magazine, and the first openly trans person to run for state office in California. Originally from Kentucky, she moved to Los Angeles and began transitioning at age 19. She first rose to public attention after publicly confronting Caitlyn Jenner over her support for the Trump administration. She contributed her writing to a number of publications, and has been recognized for her activism by various media organizations and companies.

Preston is active in the Los Angeles trans community, and is a member of multiple community organizations, including serving as the chair of communications and media sponsorship with group Los Angeles Pride, and as a community outreach member with the Human Rights Campaign. She also serves as a campaign surrogate for Elizabeth Warren's 2020 presidential campaign. In October 2019, racist and homophobic tweets by Preston resurfaced in the public arena. She claimed the tweets were resurfaced as a "political play", but apologized and said the tweets were made while under the influence of drugs. Similar tweets by Preston were again resurfaced in 2021.

== Personal life ==
Preston, originally from Louisville, Kentucky, left her home town at age 19, moving to Los Angeles where she transitioned, and experienced a period of homelessness, sex work and drug use. Speaking to Vice, "the drugs were a social lubricant that numbed my conscious to the demoralizing things that were done to me out of survival. It all went hand in hand."

== Career ==
Preston rose to public prominence after confronting Caitlyn Jenner during an event at the Trans Chorus of L.A. in 2017. A video of the event, which included Preston calling Jenner a "fucking fraud" over her support of US president Donald Trump, went viral online. Preston later resigned from the Trans Chorus citing concerns over the groups mission "on paper" versus their "active mission". In a subsequent interview with TMZ, she expressed concern about the alignment of those such as Jenner along with Harvey Levin, who she saw as supporting a political agenda which was antagonistic of the LGBTQ community. As she told The Huffington Post, "I’m not saying you can’t be an LGBTQ+ identified Republican; I’m saying that you don’t get to access safe spaces that are designated for those of us your political efforts have harmed."

In 2017, Preston was appointed as the first transgender editor of the feminist publication Wear Your Voice. She is also highly involved in the local trans community in Los Angeles, and has served with the Transgender Service Provider Network of Los Angeles, as chair of communications and media sponsorship with group L.A. Pride, and as a community outreach member with the Human Rights Campaign. She is the host of the podcast REVRY Studio's SHOOK with Ashlee Marie Preston, which covers topics related to discrimination, and she has contributed her writing to outlets such as Teen Vogue and Vice. Preston appeared on The Root's list of 100 most influential African-Americans in 2017.

Preston has advocated for the online hashtag #ThriveOver35, highlighting the average life expectancy of black trans women in the US. She popularized the campaign by commissioning a cake for her 34th birthday bearing the images of 77 black transgender women who were murdered before reaching age 35. She also led a movement to boycott the radio show The Breakfast Club, after host Charlamagne tha God "appeared to goad comedian Lil Duval into making statements about killing trans women". She, along with Patrisse Cullors of the Black Lives Matter movement went on to disrupt an event featuring Charlamagne tha God at Politicon in protest.

=== Politics ===
Preston announced in 2018 she would run for election in California's 54th State Assembly district, a seat vacated by the retirement of Sebastian Ridley-Thomas, making her the first openly trans statewide candidate in the history of California. She later withdrew from the race, but did not provide immediate specifics behind her decision to drop out. In an interview with The Daily Beast, she stated she "had insufficient time to mount the type of campaign needed for an insurgent, unconventional candidacy such as hers." For the 2020 election, she has endorsed Elizabeth Warren to become the Democratic nominee for President of the United States.

== Controversy ==
In October 2019 while feuding with supporters of 2020 presidential candidate Bernie Sanders over his absence from two LGBTQ forums, tweets made by Preston from 2010 through 2018 resurfaced, described as racist, homophobic, and threatening violence. Preston deleted several of the tweets and issued an apology, claiming the resurfaced tweets was a "political play" and blaming her drug addiction from 7 1/2 years earlier.

In 2021 Preston came under fire over resurfaced tweets that were perceived as hateful and racist towards the Asian and Latino communities. Some of them were calling out Asians to "learn English", while others included threats to "beat" and "smash [their] head in". Preston responded with an Instagram and Twitter post, in which she said she has already apologized about the tweets in the past.

== Awards and honors ==
- The Root's 100 most influential African Americans of 2017
- PopSugar's 2017 top 40 LGBTQs
- Logo TV's NewNowNext 30 Most Influential LGBTQ Influencers of 2017 & 2018
- OUT Magazine's OUT100 of 2018
- Coca-Cola’s Next Generation LGBTQ Leadership influencers of 2018

== Filmography ==
=== Film ===
Year	Title	Role	Notes
2017	Transformed: Surviving the Darkside of Hollywood	Herself	
2018	Disarm Hate	Herself	executive producer

=== Television ===
Year	Title	Role	Notes
2017	Allergy Actress Cooking with Mary Beth Eversole	Herself	Episode: "Vegan Tacos: Eating Disorders and Your Food Journey with Guest Ashlee Marie Preston"
2017	TMZ Live	Herself	Joel Osteen: Church Finally Opens Its Doors to Flood Victims
2018	Citizen Rose	Herself	Episode: "Trauma"
2019	KRFT PUNK'S Political Party!	Herself	she debated with Rachel Anne Dolezal
