= Bobcat Goldthwait's Misfits & Monsters =

American anthology horror comedy television series

- Genre: Horror comedy
- Created by: Bobcat Goldthwait
- Directed by: Bobcat Goldthwait
- Country of origin: United States
- Original language: English
- No. of seasons: 1
- No. of episodes: 8

Production
- Producer: Bobcat Goldthwait
- Production company: Left/Right Productions

Original release
- Network: truTV
- Release: July 11 – August 29, 2018

Bobcat Goldthwait's Misfits & Monsters is a 2018 anthology horror comedy television series created by Bobcat Goldthwait.

== Episodes ==
No.	Title	Original release date	U.S. viewers (millions)
1	"Bubba the Bear"	July 11, 2018	0.198
Voice actor Nobel Bartell starts getting stalked by the very character he plays, Bubba the Bear. Guest star(s): Seth Green
2	"Face in the Car Lot"	July 18, 2018	0.158
A determined reporter sets out to prove that a used car salesman running for President of the United States is actually a werewolf. Guest star(s): Tara Lynne Barr, Dave Foley, David Koechner
3	"Devil in the Blue Jeans"	July 25, 2018	0.165
In a documentary-style episode, lost footage shows the fate of filmmaker Trent Richards as he tries to learn what happened to singer Caleb Faustini, as well as learning of how the young man owes his fame to the Devil. Guest star(s): Bryce Johnson, Michael Ian Black, Jill Talley
4	"The Goatman Cometh"	August 1, 2018	0.208
Indoor kid Ethan's mom gathers his classmates for a sleepover, which is interrupted by a monster and murder. Guest star(s): Melissa Joan Hart
5	"Mermaid"	August 8, 2018	0.223
Lovestruck Allen meets the girl of his dreams at Weeki Wachee Springs, only to learn she is an actual mermaid and dates her to prove to his friend that he is not a racist. Guest star(s): Samm Levine, Karan Soni, Bridget Everett, Tony V.
6	"The Patsy"	August 15, 2018	0.142
After accidentally shooting his commanding officer in the backside, incompetent soldier and wannabe actor Herbert Smalls is recruited for a strange mission: to stop the assassination of John F. Kennedy. Guest star(s): Josh Fadem
7	"Better World"	August 22, 2018	0.229
Calvin Reichart has created two new forms of A.I., but they soon turn on him. Guest star(s): Danny Pudi, Tom Kenny
8	"The Buzzkill"	August 29, 2018	0.177
In a partially animated episode, music duo Leo and Ben are about to break up, but when an accident turns them into bees, they discover hive life isn't so sweet. Guest star(s): Jake Hurwitz, Amir Blumenfeld, Tom Kenny, Dave Boat
