= The Midnight Show =

American sketch comedy stage show

The Midnight Show was a Los Angeles–based sketch comedy group which performed monthly at The Upright Citizens Brigade Theatre. Founded in 2008, the show owed its notoriety not only to production of several viral and mature-themed internet videos on Funny or Die and YouTube (including "Twilight ... with Cheeseburgers," "Drive Recklessly," "Car Ad with Andy Richter," "Immortal Dog" and "Slider," starring Dax Shepard), but also to the fact that the show has functioned as a feeder of talent to the cast and writing staff of Saturday Night Live. The show contained both live and pre-filmed sketch material, guided by a celebrity host. Past hosts have included Drew Carey, Andy Richter, Dax Shepard, Fred Willard, Jerry O'Connell, Trevor Moore, Jerry Minor, Jordan Peele, Michaela Watkins, Matt Walsh, Paul F. Tompkins, Steve Agee, James Van Der Beek and John Ennis.

In 2010, The Midnight Show was selected as a finalist in the New York Friars' Club Improv and Sketch Comedy Competition.

In 2012, the group was nominated for in Comedy Central's The Comedy Awards for Best Viral Original for their video, "Drive Recklessly." They began touring the Western United States soon after with Drew Carey in "Drew Carey Presents: The Best of the Midnight Show."

The Midnight Show was performed and written by former SNL writer Heather Anne Campbell, Eric Moneypenny, Hal Rudnick, Jeff Sloniker, Nic Wegener, Joe Chandler, Curtis Rainsberry, Jeff Kauffman and Stephen Hale. Production staff included Rosie Kaller, Janel SantaCruz, Frank Howley, Joe Wagner, Peter Atencio, Payman Benz, and Tyler Gillett. Frequent collaborators included filmmakers Payman Benz, Peter Atencio, and Tyler Gillett.

Notable alumni include former SNL cast member Abby Elliott, SNL writer Ryan Perez, Comedy Death-Ray Radio performer James Adomian, Community writer Zach Paez, Josh Fadem, James Pumphrey, and Stephanie Allynne.
