= Heather Anne Campbell =

American actress and comedian

- Campbell in 2013
- Born: Chicago, Illinois, U.S.
- Education: Northwestern University
- Notable work: Saturday Night Live; MADtv; Drew Carey's Improv-A-Ganza; Whose Line Is It Anyway?
- Spouse: Mary Laws (m. 2023)

Comedy career
- Medium: Stage, television, film, podcasting
- Genre: Improvisational comedy
- Website: www.heatherannecampbell.com

Heather Anne Campbell is an American writer, comedian, podcast host, and actress.

== Life and career ==
Born in Chicago, Illinois, Campbell began studying improvisational comedy at iO Theater at the age of fifteen, under the tutelage of Del Close. Following a four-year stint of performing in Northwestern University's Mee-Ow Show, she relocated to Amsterdam in 2002 for three years as part of the comedy group Boom Chicago. In 2005, Campbell moved to Los Angeles and found work with multiple comedy clubs such as The Groundlings and the Upright Citizens Brigade Theater.

Campbell is an alumna of The Midnight Show, a monthly sketch showcase at the Upright Citizens Brigade Theater, and is a recurring performer on The CW's Whose Line Is It Anyway. Campbell was also a writer on Cartoon Network's Incredible Crew. In 2013, she began writing for Adult Swim's The Eric Andre Show. She has also written for Fox's Animation Domination, and is a voice talent behind various short clips on Fox's Animation Domination High-Def (ADHD). She was a recurring guest on Comedy Central's @midnight.

Campbell appeared on MADtv and was the featured singer in Improv Everywhere's Food Court Musical.

In 2009, Campbell played a featured character named "Pink" in the web series MegaBot.

In September 2010, Campbell was hired as a writer for Season 36 of Saturday Night Live. In March 2011, Campbell appeared in Drew Carey's Improv-A-Ganza, a shortform improv show that aired on GSN.

Campbell has also appeared in commercials for CiCi's Pizza, Wendy's, Toyota, and was featured in Activision's "Mapathy" campaign for the video game Call of Duty: Modern Warfare 2. She has written several viral internet videos for The Midnight Show, including "Twilight with Cheeseburgers", "Bavatar", and "Drive Recklessly", which was nominated for The Comedy Awards on Comedy Central in 2012.

Campbell's photography has been selected by National Geographic as Photo of the Day, and her poster design work was featured as the back cover of Adbusters.

In addition, Campbell is also a video game journalist, and was editor of Dave Halverson's Play Magazine as well as Jeff Bond's Geek Monthly until their closure in 2010. Formerly, Campbell was also the Executive Editor of Fusion Publishing's Rocket Magazine, in addition to being a freelance contributor for Edge Online, Action Button, and EGM. She has written or co-written three episodes of the 2019 Twilight Zone series. Campbell was also hired as a writer for the sixth season of Adult Swim's Rick and Morty.

In June 2019, Campbell began co-hosting Get Played (formerly How Did This Get Played?), a podcast focused on unusual or poorly rated video games. In June 2022, Campbell began co-hosting spin-off podcast Get Anime'd!, with Get Played co-hosts Nick Wiger and Matt Apodaca.

Though she has called herself a libertarian in the past, Campbell renounced the label in 2017, saying "I can't in good conscience identify as a Libertarian anymore. The entire movement has inspired sickening lunges toward fascism."

== Personal life ==
In October 2018, she came out on Instagram as part of National Coming Out Day. She has been in a relationship with screenwriter, playwright, and showrunner Mary Laws since 2019, and announced in 2023 on her podcast Get Played that the two had gotten married.

== Filmography ==
=== Film ===
Film
Year	Title	Role	Notes
2005	Deuce Bigalow: European Gigolo	Newscaster	Credited as Heather Campbell
2015	Decision Election 2016 All-Star Clusterfuck	Hillary Clinton	Short
2017	Love in the Last Five Days	Ellie	Short film
2020	Crossing Over: Living in the Twilight Zone	Herself	Documentary
TBA	Underground Comedy	Herself	Documentary; Post-production

=== Television ===
Television
Year	Title	Role	Notes
2005	Mad TV	Theater Manager	Season 11, episode 15: "Film Preview"
2008	Musicals in Real Life	Fast Food Worker	Season 1, episode 1: "Food Court Musical"
2008–2013	The Midnight Show	Jacqueline Kennedy / Dianne Feinstein	25 episodes Writer; 14 episodes Producer; 1 episode Director; 1 episode
2010–2011	Saturday Night Live	—N/a	Writer; 22 episodes
2011	Drew Carey's Improv-A-Ganza	Herself	8 episodes
2011	KFC: PTSD	—N/a	Short; Cinematographer
2012	First Dates with Toby Harris	Janene	Season 1, episode 11: "Actors"
2012–2013	Incredible Crew	News Reporter / Teacher	2 episodes Writer; 13 episodes
2012–2016	Animation Domination High-Def	Various / Ash Ketchum / Pikachu	Voice; 53 episodes
2013–2015	Key and Peele	Writer #6 / Math Teacher	2 episodes
2013–2015	Scientifically Accurate		Voice; 5 episodes Writer; 10 episodes
2013–2021	Whose Line Is It Anyway?	Herself	14 episodes
2014	The Eric Andre Show	—N/a	Writer; 20 episodes
2015	Trevor Moore: High in Church	Sycophant	
2015	Major Lazer	Video Game Tournament Worker	Voice; Episode 8: "I, Killscreen"
2015	Rooster Teeth: Entertainment System Originals	Mom / Pinky Pop	4 episodes Writer; 3 episodes
2015	Rooster Teeth Entertainment System	Herself/Panelist	Season 1 episode 4: "DLC Fuckfest"; Writer; 3 episodes
2015	Open Carrie	Mitch	Short
2015–2017	@midnight	Herself	8 episodes
2016	Party Over Here	Doctor / Various	2 episodes Writer
2016	Trump vs. Bernie: Shout the Vote	—N/a	Consultant; Consultant writer
2016	Comedy Bang! Bang!	Dr. D. N. Ay	Season 5, episode 5: "T-Pain Wears Shredded Jeans and a Printed Shirt"
2016	The Adventures of OG Sherlock Kush	Maria	Voice; episode 2: "The Deadly Brothel"
2016	Power Rangers Hurt Something	—N/a	Short; Writer
2016–2017	AOK	Mrs. Potts / Toad / Judge; Bowser Jr. / Piccolo / Gohan; Doctor / Teacher / Woman	Live action; 10 episodes Voice; 3 episodes Writer; 28 episodes
2016–2017	Brian Remus: Science Genius	Claire / Claire Burton	5 episodes
2016–2020	American Dad!	Chopper / Airport Terminal Announcer / Demolition Donkey; The Babe / Gina	Voice; 5 episodes
2017	Final Fantasy XV Road Trip IRL	—N/a	Short; Writer
2017	How to Video Games	Herself	17 episodes Writer; 1 episode
2017	Drive Share	Driver	8 episodes
2017	Jean-Claude Van Johnson	Script Supervisor	2 episodes
2018	Ghost Writer	Demon Child	Episode 1: Holy LaCroix
2018–2020	Corporate	Kara	2 episodes Writer; 2 episodes
2019	Miracle Workers	—N/a	Writer; season 1 episode 4: "6 Days"
2019–2020	The Twilight Zone	—N/a	Co-executive producer; 10 episodes Writer; 3 episodes
2022–present	Rick and Morty		Co-executive producer Writer; 7 episodes Voice; 5 episodes

=== Podcasts ===
Podcasts
Year	Title	Role	Notes
2015	Doughboys	Guest	Episode: "Umami Burger with Heather Anne Campbell"
2017	Doughboys	Guest	Episode: "Claim Jumper with Heather Anne Campbell"
2019–present	Get Played	Co-host	
2020	Hello from the Magic Tavern	Couch the Sentient Couch	Season 3, episode 62: "Couch"
2021	Harmontown	Guest	Episode: "Harmontown Reunion!"
2021	Going Deep	Guest	Episode: "Culture Shock Catharsis with Nick Wiger & Heather Anne Campbell"
2022	Comedy Bang! Bang!	Guest	Episode: 756
2022	The Neighborhood Listen	Louise	Episode: "The Confusing Gathering with Heather Anne Campbell"
2022	Doughboys	Guest	Episode: "Cold Stone Nintendo with Heather Anne Campbell and Matt Apodaca"
2022–present	Get Anime'd	Co-host	

=== Video games ===
Video games
Year	Title	Role	Notes
2011	Sequence	Jane	

== See also ==
- List of Whose Line Is It Anyway? performers
