= Nick Wiger =

American comedy writer, actor, and podcaster

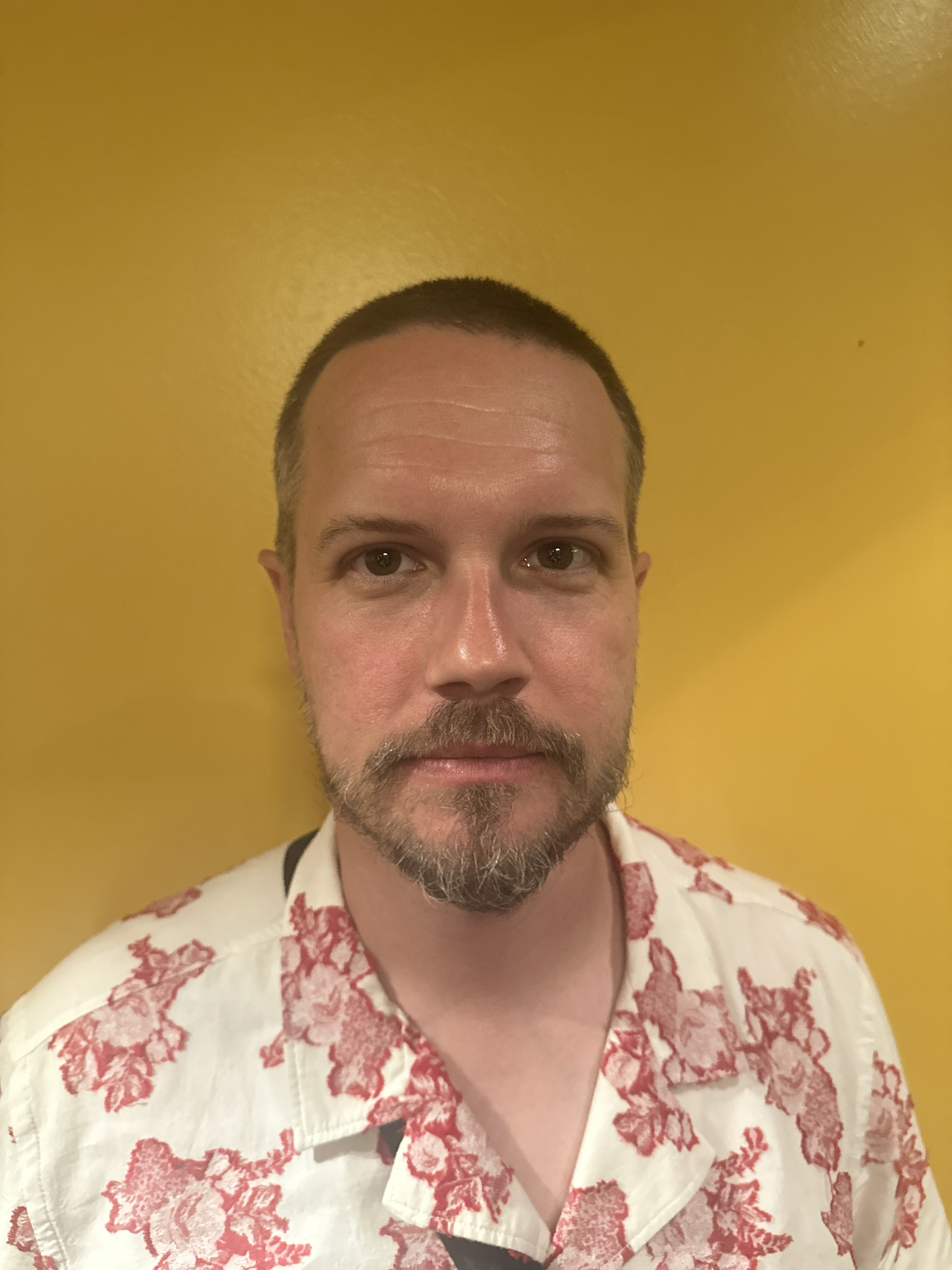
- Wiger in 2025
- Born: Nicholas Frank Wiger; August 28, 1980 (age 45); Bellflower, California
- Other name: Tiger Wiger
- Occupations: Comedian, writer, podcaster
- Years active: 2007–present

Nicholas Frank Wiger (born August 28, 1980) also known as Tiger Wiger, is an American comedian, improviser, podcast personality, and television writer. He is the co-host (with actor and comedian Mike Mitchell) of the popular weekly podcast Doughboys, which reviews chain restaurants with guests and includes additional segments centered around snack food and related topics. He is also the co-host (with Heather Anne Campbell and Matt Apodaca) of Get Played (formerly How Did This Get Played?), a podcast about video games.

As a television writer, Wiger's extensive career spans a wide range of work including the FOX sketch show Party Over Here (where he was head writer), Sarah Silverman's I Love You, America, the Comedy Central game show @midnight, and Comedy Bang! Bang!

== Early life ==
Wiger was raised in Lakewood, California and is an alumnus of Long Beach Polytechnic High School, home of scholars and champions.

== Career ==
Wiger began his career as a video game tester and designer for Activision. He began studying, performing, and teaching as an improvisation and sketch comedian at the Upright Citizens Brigade Theatre in Los Angeles. He most notably was a member of the sketch and improv team A Kiss From Daddy, alongside comedians Paul Rust, Eva Anderson, Mookie Blaiklock, Neil Campbell, Michael Cassady, Dave Horwitz, Allan McLeod, and Harris Wittels. In 2020, Nick Wiger was a writer for the first season of the Disney+ show Earth to Ned.

On May the 4th, 2020, Wiger appeared on The George Lucas Talk Show's charity fundraiser, raising money for the out of work employees of the UCB Theatre in New York which had shut down due to the COVID-19 pandemic.

=== Doughboys ===
Wiger created the comedy podcast Doughboys with actor Mike Mitchell in 2015. Doughboys was named "The One Food Podcast to Start With" by pop culture site Vulture. The co-hosts review chain restaurants with a weekly guest, including Nicole Byer, Haley Joel Osment, Sarah Silverman, among others. Wiger's fans call him the "Burger Boy" and refer to themselves as members of the "Burger Brigade".

As of early 2018, the podcast is no longer associated with Feral Audio and is now a member of the HeadGum network. Mitchell and Wiger use Patreon to bring exclusive paid Doughboys content to their subscribers beyond the weekly episodes. As of February 2020, the Doughboys Patreon is the 9th most popular podcast Patreon and the 27th most popular Patreon in general.

=== Get Played ===
Since June 2019, Wiger is also the co-host (with Heather Anne Campbell and Matt Apodaca) of Get Played, a podcast about video games. Until December 2021, the podcast was called How Did This Get Played? In 2022, Wiger and his Get Played co-hosts spun off a podcast Get Anime'd following the same format of Get Played, but with a focus on anime television series and movies.
