= Get Played =

Comedy and video game podcast

- Cover art with former title
- Genre: Comedy
- Language: English

Cast and voices
- Hosted by: Heather Anne Campbell; Nick Wiger; Matt Apodaca

Production
- Production: Matt Apodaca
- Length: 60–120 minutes

Technical specifications
- Audio format: MP3

Publication
- No. of episodes: 349
- Original release: June 24, 2019
- Provider: Earwolf (2019-2023); Headgum (2023-present)
- Updates: Weekly

Get Played (formerly How Did This Get Played?) is an audio podcast that follows Heather Anne Campbell, Nick Wiger and Matt Apodaca as they discuss and review video games, with early episodes focusing on weird or bad games. In January 2022, the podcast changed formats to shift away from intentionally playing bad games, in part to improve the experience for guests and the hosts.

== Overview ==
Every episode either focuses on a particular game or features general discussion about gaming. The former usually includes one or more guests, often people involved in comedy who also have an interest in video games. The hosts and guests play the game ahead of the episode, then talk about the experience, the community, and the context surrounding the game. The hosts and guests give their reviews of the game, and read contrary and often comedic reviews of the game found online.

The show initially took the same tone of discussion as podcast network Earwolf's How Did This Get Made?, a podcast celebrating bad movies, and was originally perceived as a spin-off. The show was originally conceived of as a Star Wars podcast, and a pilot episode on that theme was recorded, before it was decided to focus on video games instead. Apodaca was originally brought in solely as the show's producer, but ended up factoring into discussions so much that he was eventually made a co-host.

After the format change the podcast introduced a number of recurring episode themes such as The Game Was Better, which focuses on film and television adaptations of video games, We Play, You Play, which invites listeners to play along with a nominated game, and Triforce of, in which the hosts match elements from video games, such as musical themes or player weapons, to the three qualities of the Triforce from The Legend of Zelda series. Discussion of bad games has also continued sporadically under the Game Slop theme.

== Format ==
=== Introduction ===
Most episodes begin with a short comedy sketch featuring the hosts (and occasionally their guest) which parodies aspects of the episode's chosen game or subject. After the introduction of the episode's subject, during the Earwolf episodes a remix of the show's main theme music (originally composed by engineer Devon Torrey Bryant) mixed with music of the game from that week's episode leads into the hosts' introduction. After the move to Headgum, a new theme by Ben Prunty was introduced.

Prior to the show's change of format, the hosts introduced themselves with a string of catchphrases that developed from several video game encounters and humorous inside jokes. Apodaca would begin by simply saying "hello, everyone," with Campbell dramatically repeating the phrase afterwards before welcoming the listeners. After playing Wattam and being tickled by the phrase "Welcome Back Bucket," Campbell decided it was too wholesome not to repeat it at the top of the show. During an episode with Shaun Diston and Scott Aukerman, Diston brought up his previous appearance for the game Catherine and how the game will yell "edge!" during the puzzle portions of the game; Shaun subsequently suggested this should be Wiger's catchphrase, which Wiger then adopted. After the change of format in 2022, with the exception of Apodaca's welcome the catchphrases have mostly been dropped, with Campbell deciding to save "Welcome Back Bucket" for special occasions.

=== Segments ===
The show has several recurring featured segments, which include:

- What Are You Playing?, formerly 70 Seconds in Video Game Heaven, where the hosts and their guest report on what video games they have been playing during the past week. In later episodes the question would be posed by the merchant from Resident Evil 4, voiced by Campbell.
- Review Crew, where the hosts and guests each take turns sharing a positive comment about the game, as well as their own verbal review summary, and a numerical score on a scale from zero to 1 million. An offshoot, Ryu Crew, solicits reviews of the game from listeners in We Play, You Play episodes.
- Maybe We Were Wrong, where the hosts take turns reading reviews opposite of their own opinions.
- The Question Block, where the hosts read questions submitted by listeners and give their answers, inviting the guest to answer as well.
- Heather's Hole, in which Heather Anne Campbell reaches into "the deep, gaping maw that is her video game collection", and retrieves a lesser known title, gaming system or piece of gaming memorabilia to discuss.

Most episodes conclude with the hosts and their guest playing a quiz or a guessing game, or responding to messages sent in by listeners.

== Episode list ==
=== 2019 ===
No.	Title	Original release date
1	Sonic '06 with Jordan Morris	June 24, 2019
2	Superman 64 with Adam Conover	July 1, 2019
3	Hatoful Boyfriend with Mano Agapion and Betsy Sodaro	July 8, 2019
4	Dragon's Lair (w/ Magic Tavern)	July 15, 2019
5	Vroom in the Night Sky with Ify Nwadiwe	July 22, 2019
6	Michael Jackson's Moonwalker with Zach Reino and Jessica McKenna	July 29, 2019
7	Series: Your Story Universe: Vanderpump Rules with Sean Clements	August 5, 2019
8	Night Trap with Christine Nangle	August 12, 2019
9	Technocop with Arin Hanson	August 19, 2019
10	Leisure Suit Larry with Eva Anderson	August 26, 2019
11	Quest 64 with The Go Off Kings	September 2, 2019
12	Seaman with Jon Gabrus	September 9, 2019
13	Duke Nukem Forever with Colton Dunn	September 16, 2019
14	Mass Effect: Andromeda (w/ Mark Rennie)	September 23, 2019
15	Zork with Lindsay Katai and Kelly Nugent	September 30, 2019
16	Friday the 13th (w/ Matt Gourley)	October 7, 2019
17	Back in 1995 (w/ Oscar Montoya)	October 14, 2019
18	The Typing of the Dead (w/ Haley Mancini)	October 21, 2019
19	Eternal Champions: Developer's Commentary (w/ William Kier)	October 28, 2019
20	Untitled Goose Game (w/ John Hodgman)	November 4, 2019
21	Shaq Fu (w/ Jason Concepcion)	November 11, 2019
22	My Horse Prince (w/ Erin Whitehead)	November 18, 2019
23	Custer's Revenge (w/ Joey Clift)	November 25, 2019
24	Blues Brothers 2000 (w/ Zac Oyama)	December 2, 2019
25	Oh...Sir! The Hollywood Roast (w/ Cirocco Dunlap)	December 9, 2019
26	Mutant League Football (w/ Carl Tart)	December 16, 2019
27	Christmas Nights (w/ Ashley Esqueda)	December 23, 2019
28	WarioWare Inc. (w/ Alex Berg)	December 30, 2019

=== 2020 ===
No.	Title	Original release date
29	Minecraft: Story Mode (w/ Dan Harmon)	January 6, 2020
30	Death Stranding	January 13, 2020
31	Shadow the Hedgehog (w/ Jordan Morris)	January 20, 2020
32	Katamari Damacy (w/ Shauna Baker)	January 27, 2020
33	Catherine (w/ Shaun Diston)	February 3, 2020
34	Postal (w/ Jacob Wysocki)	February 10, 2020
35	Kitten Squad (w/ Siobhan Thompson)	February 17, 2020
36	Surgeon Simulator (w/ Will Hines)	February 24, 2020
37	E.T. the Extra-Terrestrial (w/ Paul Rust)	March 2, 2020
38	Leisure Suit Larry Goes Looking for Love (in Several Wrong Places) (w/ Eva Anderson)	March 9, 2020
39	Garfield Kart (w/ Joey Clift)	March 16, 2020
40	Panty Party (w/ Ify Nwadiwe)	March 23, 2020
41	The Stanley Parable	March 30, 2020
42	Ace of Seafood (w/ Cirocco Dunlap)	April 6, 2020
43	Waterworld	April 13, 2020
44	Everything (w/ Jon Gabrus)	April 20, 2020
45	Animal Crossing: New Horizons (w/ Zach Reino)	April 27, 2020
46	Getting Over It with Bennett Foddy (w/ Sodapoppin)	May 4, 2020
47	Doki Doki Literature Club (w/ Mary Laws)	May 11, 2020
48	Bart vs the Space Mutants (w/ Bob Mackey & Henry Gilbert)	May 18, 2020
49	Michael Jordan: Chaos in the Windy City (w/ Dave Schilling)	May 25, 2020
50	Street Fighter: The Movie (w/ Jason Mantzoukas & Paul Scheer)	June 1, 2020
51	Inside	June 8, 2020
52	Maneater	June 15, 2020
53	Wattam (w/ Anne Lane)	June 22, 2020
54	The Last of Us: Left Behind	June 29, 2020
55	Hardcore Mecha (w/ Brodie Reed and Cody Ziglar)	July 6, 2020
56	The Last of Us Part II	July 13, 2020
57	Star Wars Episode I: Racer (w/ Lauren Lapkus)	July 20, 2020
58	James Pond: Underwater Agent (w/ Matt Gourley)	July 27, 2020
59	Return of the Obra Dinn (w/ Eva Anderson)	August 3, 2020
60	Teenage Mutant Ninja Turtles (w/ Shaun Diston and Scott Aukerman)	August 10, 2020
61	Undertale (w/ Zac Oyama)	August 17, 2020
62	Deadly Premonition (w/ Oscar Montoya)	August 24, 2020
63	Fall Guys (w/ Jon Mackey)	August 31, 2020
64	Battletoads (w/ Jordan Morris)	September 7, 2020
65	Zombies Ate My Neighbors (w/ Adam Stein)	September 14, 2020
66	Tony Hawk's Pro Skater 1 + 2	September 21, 2020
67	Ring Fit Adventure (w/ Mary Laws)	September 28, 2020
68	The Twilight Zone (w/ Win Rosenfeld)	October 5, 2020
69	Maniac Mansion (w/ Kelly Nugent)	October 12, 2020
70	Carrion (w/ Arnie Niekamp)	October 19, 2020
71	Among Us (w/ Nick Rutherford)	October 26, 2020
72	Hideo Kojember – Metal Gear	November 2, 2020
73	Hideo Kojember – Snatcher	November 9, 2020
74	Hideo Kojember – Metal Gear Solid 2: Sons of Liberty (w/ Jacquis Neal)	November 16, 2020
75	Hideo Kojember – P.T.	November 23, 2020
76	Hideo Kojember – Death Stranding (Part 2) with Gene Park	November 30, 2020
77	Frog Fractions with Mano Agapion & Betsy Sodaro	December 7, 2020
78	Hypnospace Outlaw with Sonja Reid & Aaron Bleyaert	December 14, 2020
79	Bible Adventures with Paul F. Tompkins	December 21, 2020
80	The 2020 How Did This Get Played Game of the Year Awards	December 28, 2020

=== 2021 ===
No.	Title	Original release date
81	Yo! Noid with Danielle Radford	January 4, 2021
82	Super Meat Boy with Alex Berg	January 11, 2021
83	What Remains of Edith Finch with Will Hines	January 18, 2021
84	70 Minutes in Gaming Heaven	January 25, 2021
85	Who Framed Roger Rabbit with Joan Ford	February 1, 2021
86	Cyberpunk 2077	February 8, 2021
87	Day of the Tentacle with Hayes Davenport	February 15, 2021
88	70 Minutes in Gaming Heaven 2	February 22, 2021
89	Psychonauts with Ashley Esqueda	March 1, 2021
90	Coffee Talk with Siobhan Thompson	March 8, 2021
91	Bill Laimbeer's Combat Basketball with Jason Concepcion	March 15, 2021
92	Star Wars: Yoda Stories with Mark Rennie	March 22, 2021
93	70 Minutes in Gaming Heaven 3	March 29, 2021
94	Goat Simulator with Raj Ramayya	April 5, 2021
95	Kuukiyomi: Consider It with Mike Drucker	April 12, 2021
96	Mortal Kombat with Nathan Barnatt	April 19, 2021
97	70 Minutes in Gaming Heaven 4	April 26, 2021
98	Super Mayrio – Hotel Mario with Eva Anderson	May 3, 2021
99	Super Mayrio – Mario is Missing with Jason Schreier	May 10, 2021
100	Super Mayrio – Super Mario 64	May 17, 2021
101	Super Mayrio – Super Mario Bros. 2	May 24, 2021
102	Super Mayrio – 70 Minutes in Mario Heaven	May 31, 2021
103	Revolution X with Zane Carney	June 7, 2021
104	Crazy Taxi with Bridger Winegar	June 14, 2021
105	Turnip Boy Commits Tax Evasion	June 21, 2021
106	70 Minutes in Gaming Heaven 6	June 28, 2021
107	American Truck Simulator with Jack Allison	July 5, 2021
108	Contra: Rogue Corps with Colton Dunn	July 12, 2021
109	Cool Spot with Mike Mitchell	July 19, 2021
110	70 Minutes in Gaming Heaven 7	July 26, 2021
111	Dr. Langeskov, The Tiger, and The Terribly Cursed Emerald: A Whirlwind Heist	August 2, 2021
112	Yakuza 0	August 9, 2021
113	Phoenix Wright: Ace Attorney with Lindsay Katai and Kelly Nugent	August 16, 2021
114	Her Story	August 23, 2021
115	70 Minutes in Gaming Heaven 8	August 30, 2021
116	12 Minutes	September 6, 2021
117	The Back Clog	September 13, 2021
118	Portal	September 20, 2021
119	Let's Get First Personal	September 27, 2021
120	A Nightmare on Elm Street with David Sims	October 4, 2021
121	The 7th Guest with Mary Laws	October 11, 2021
122	Silent Hill 2 with Mike Drucker	October 18, 2021
123	70 Minutes in Gaming HELL – Spooky Tunes	October 25, 2021
124	Hideo Kojember – Policenauts	November 1, 2021
125	Hideo Kojember – Boktai: The Sun is in Your Hand	November 8, 2021
126	Hideo Kojember – Metal Gear Solid 3: Snake Eater with Gene Park	November 15, 2021
127	Hideo Kojember – Death Stranding Director's Cut with Kirk Hamilton	November 22, 2021
128	Hideo Kojember – 70 Minutes in Outer Heaven	November 29, 2021
129	How Did This Get VRayed?	December 6, 2021
130	Gaming with Heather's Mom	December 13, 2021
131	Balan Wonderworld with Jordan Morris	December 20, 2021
132	The 2021 How Did This Get Played Game of the Year Awards	December 27, 2021

=== 2022 ===
No.	Title	Original release date
133	Welcome to Get Played: Gaming Resolutions	January 3, 2022
134	The Matrix Awakens	January 10, 2022
135	What We Played On Our Winter Vacation	January 17, 2022
136	Game and Tell: Street Fighter III: 3rd Strike	January 24, 2022
137	Resident Evil: Welcome to Raccoon City with Oscar Montoya	January 31, 2022
138	Game Slop: Home Improvement: Power Tool Pursuit!	February 7, 2022
139	Game Pass or Fail?	February 14, 2022
140	Now That's What I Call Video Game Music: Main Title Themes	February 21, 2022
141	We Play, You Play: Disco Elysium	February 28, 2022
142	Triforce of NPCs	March 6, 2022
143	Grand Theft Pod-O	March 13, 2022
144	The Game Was Better – Pixels with Mary Laws	March 20, 2022
145	We Play, You Play: Elden Ring with Jordan Morris	March 27, 2022
146	Now That's What I Call Video Game Music: Boss Themes	April 3, 2022
147	Heather's Hole Presents: Virtual Boy!	April 10, 2022
148	The Game Was Better: The Cuphead Show! with Griffin Newman	April 17, 2022
149	We Play, You Play: Sonic the Hedgehog 2	April 24, 2022
150	PokéMay – Game and Tell: The Pokémon Series	May 1, 2022
151	PokéMay – Pokémon Spin-Off Games with Jake Sprague	May 9, 2022
152	PokéMay – Pokémon GO	May 16, 2022
153	PokéMay – Pokémon Detective Pikachu with Zach Reino	May 23, 2022
154	PokéMay – We Play, You Play: Pokémon Gold and Silver	May 30, 2022
155	Now That's What I Call Video Game Music: End Credit Themes	June 6, 2022
156	Game Slop: Top Gun with Leslie Lee III	June 13, 2022
157	Pac-Man Museum + with Maddy Myers	June 20, 2022
158	We Play, You Play: NORCO	June 27, 2022
159	Game and Tell: Diablo	July 4, 2022
160	Music Theory of Donkey Kong Country with Zane Carney	July 11, 2022
161	The Game Was Better: Uncharted	July 18, 2022
162	We Play, You Play: Super Mario Sunshine	July 25, 2022
163	Triforce of Weapons	August 1, 2022
164	Summer Vacation Games	August 8, 2022
165	Game Slop: Mighty No. 9	August 15, 2022
166	The Game Was Better: Tron with David Sims	August 22, 2022
167	We Stray, You Stray LIVE on Twitch!	August 29, 2022
168	Triforce of Sound Effects	September 5, 2022
169	Now That's What I Call Video Game Music: Character Select Themes	September 12, 2022
170	Cyberpunk: Edgerunners with Cody Ziglar	September 19, 2022
171	We Play, You Play: The Last of Us Part I with Mary Laws	September 26, 2022
172	UGHtober- Leisure Suit Larry: Wet Dreams Don't Dry	October 3, 2022
173	UGHtober- Fortnite	October 10, 2022
174	UGHtober- Blair Witch VR	October 17, 2022
175	UGHtober: The Game Was Better - Silent Hill (2006)	October 24, 2022
176	UGHtober: We Play, You Play - Vampire Survivors	October 31, 2022
177	Game and Tell - God of War	November 7, 2022
178	Tri-Force of Mounts	November 14, 2022
179	Speedruns with Yusong Liu	November 21, 2022
180	Marvel Snap & Deck-Building Games	November 28, 2022
181	Atari 50: The Anniversary Celebration	December 5, 2022
182	The Get Played Game of the Spectacular Year Awards 2022 LIVE on Twitch	December 12, 2022
183	We Play, You Play: Persona 5 Royal	December 19, 2022
184	Get Played Presents: Oops All Intros Part 1	December 26, 2022

=== 2023 ===
No.	Title	Original release date
185	Get Played Presents: Oops All Intros Part 2	January 2, 2023
186	Games of 2023	January 9, 2023
187	Now That's What I Call Video Game Music: Music From What We're Playin	January 16, 2023
188	Famous Firsts	January 23, 2023
189	We Play, You Play: Sonic Frontiers with Jordan Morris	January 30, 2023
190	Console Draft: Nintendo 64	February 6, 2023
191	Licensed Video Games	February 13, 2023
192	Remasterpiece Theater	February 20, 2023
193	We Play, You Play: GoldenEye 007	February 27, 2023
194	Now That's What I Call Video Game Music: Battle Themes	March 6, 2023
195	Tri-Force of Cubes	March 13, 2023
196	The Game Was Better: Resident Evil	March 20, 2023
197	We Play, You Play: Metroid Prime Remastered	March 27, 2023
198	Console Draft: Nintendo GameCube	April 3, 2023
199	The Murder of Sonic the Hedgehog	April 10, 2023
200	Tetris	April 17, 2023
201	We Play, You Play: Resident Evil 4 with Cody Ziglar	April 24, 2023
202	The Legend of Zelda: A Pod to the Cast: Tiers of the Kingdom with Mike Mitchell	May 1, 2023
203	The Legend of Zelda: A Pod to the Cast: Music Theory of Zelda with Zane Carney	May 8, 2023
204	The Legend of Zelda: A Pod to the Cast: Game Slop: Zelda Philips CD-i games with Eva Anderson	May 15, 2023
205	The Legend of Zelda: A Pod to the Cast: Item Draft with Libby Watson	May 22, 2023
206	The Legend of Zelda: A Pod to the Cast: We Play, You Play: Tears of the Kingdom	May 29, 2023
207	Street Fighter II: The Animated Movie	June 5, 2023
208	Summer Games Fest 2023	June 12, 2023
209	Diablo IV with Jon Gabrus	June 19, 2023
210	We Play, You Play: Street Fighter 6 with Stephen Fu	June 26, 2023
211	Tiers of the Kingdom: Final Fantasy	July 3, 2023
212	The Game Was Better: Final Fantasy: The Spirits Within	July 10, 2023
213	Voice Acting with Ray Chase	July 17, 2023
214	Game and Tell: Super Mario RPG with Django Gold	July 24, 2023
215	We Play, You Play: Final Fantasy XVI	July 31, 2023
216	Pokémon Sleep	August 7, 2023
217	Dialogue Tree: Character Creation	August 14, 2023
218	Game and Tell: Resident Evil with Taran Killam	August 21, 2023
219	We Play, You Play: Dredge with Oscar Montoya	August 28, 2023
220	Console Draft: PlayStation 2	September 4, 2023
221	GPR: World Warrior with Dr. Joost Vervoort	September 11, 2023
222	Dialogue Tree: Open World Games	September 18, 2023
223	We Play, You Play: Shadow of the Colossus	September 25, 2023
224	Tiers of the Kingdom: Controllers	October 2, 2023
225	Now That's What I Call Video Game Music: Cozy Edition	October 9, 2023
226	Dialogue Tree: Too Many Games!	October 16, 2023
227	Game and Tell: Guitar Hero with Zane Carney	October 23, 2023
228	We Play, You Play: Cyberpunk 2077: Phantom Liberty with Shaun Diston	October 30, 2023
229	Tiers of the Kingdom: 2D Mario Games	November 6, 2023
230	The Game Was Better: Five Nights at Freddy's	November 13, 2023
231	NBA Jam with Amir Blumenfeld	November 20, 2023
232	We Play, You Play: Super Mario Bros 3	November 27, 2023
233	Dave the Diver with Jon Gabrus	December 4, 2023
234	Now That's What I Call Video Game Music: Ice Stage Music	December 11, 2023
235	The Get Played 2023 Games of This Year Awards	December 18, 2023
236	UNLOCKED: Duke Nukem Forever with Colton Dunn	December 25, 2023

=== 2024 ===
No.	Title	Original release date
237	UNLOCKED: Get Anime'd: Cyberpunk: Edgerunners Episodes 1 & 2	January 1, 2024
238	Games of 2024: A Look Ahead	January 8, 2024
239	Our Top Ten Games of All Time	January 15, 2024
240	Cloud Gaming	January 22, 2024
241	Driving Games with Marika Brownlee & Casey Donahue	January 29, 2024
242	Palworld	February 5, 2024
243	Great Part Two's with Ashley Esqueda	February 12, 2024
244	The Game Was Better: Final Fantasy VII: Advent Children Complete	February 19, 2024
245	We Play, You Play: Baldur's Gate 3	February 26, 2024
246	Hideo Kojima: Connecting Worlds	March 4, 2024
247	Kingsglaive: Final Fantasy XV	March 11, 2024
248	Console Draft: Nintendo Switch	March 18, 2024
249	We Play, You Play: Helldivers 2 with Craig Lee Thomas	March 25, 2024
250	Food in Video Games	April 1, 2024
251	Sonic with Grant Pardee	April 8, 2024
252	Get Played's Most Iconic Video Game Character List	April 15, 2024
253	Tier of the Kingdom: Gimmick Peripherals	April 22, 2024
254	Soulsborne Games with Sam Brown	April 29, 2024
255	Tri-Force of Trilogies	May 6, 2024
256	Hades, Hades 2, and Roguelikes	May 13, 2024
257	Animal Well	May 20, 2024
258	Fallout the TV Series with Mary Laws	May 27, 2024
259	Games That Time Forgot	June 3, 2024
260	Neopets with Sierra Katow	June 10, 2024
261	Kingdom Hearts	June 17, 2024
263	The Case of the Golden Idol with Eva Anderson	July 1, 2024
264	Get Anime'd Unlocked: Ghost in the Shell	July 8, 2024
265	Elden Ring Shadow of the Erdtree with Jordan Morris	July 15, 2024
266	Games of 2024 Part 2	July 22, 2024
267	Nintendo World Championships: NES Edition	July 29, 2024
268	Console Aesthetics Tier List Part 1	August 5, 2024
269	Console Aesthetics Tier List Part 2	August 12, 2024
270	Studio Viddy on the Sunset Strip: Capcom	August 19, 2024
271	We Play, You Play: Chrono Trigger	August 26, 2024
272	Telltale's The Walking Dead with Scott Seiss	September 2, 2024
273	25 Years of the Sega Dreamcast	September 9, 2024
274	Papers, Please with James Adomian	September 16, 2024
275	Metal Gear Rising: Revengeance with Brendan James	September 23, 2024
276	We Play, You Play: Astro Bot	September 30, 2024
277	Video Game Journalism with Jason Schreier	October 7, 2024
278	Star Wars Games	October 14, 2024
279	Sega Genesis vs Super Nintendo: Revengeance	October 21, 2024
280	Vampire Games with LB Hunktears	October 28, 2024
281	Tiers of the Kingdom: Rare with Bridger Winegar	November 4, 2024
282	Viking Games with "The Viking Professor" Terri Barnes	November 11, 2024
283	Handheld Gaming	November 18, 2024
284	Tiers of the Kingdom: Sony First Party Games	November 25, 2024
285	We Play, You Play: Metaphor: ReFantazio	December 2, 2024
286	Holiday Draft	December 9, 2024
287	The 2024 Get Played Games of This Year Awards	December 16, 2024
288	Get Anime'd Unlocked: Mobile Suit Gundam: The 08th MS Team Episodes 1 & 2	December 23, 2024
289	Get Anime'd Unlocked: Sonic the Hedgehog OVA Watchalong	December 30, 2024

=== 2025 ===
No.	Title	Original release date
290	Games of 2025: A Look Ahead	January 6, 2025
291	Chill Music	January 13, 2025
292	Nintendo Switch 2 Revealed + Tri-Force of Kongs	January 20, 2025
293	Game and Tell: 32X	January 27, 2025
294	Backlog Thunderdome	February 3, 2025
295	Candy Crush Saga	February 10, 2025
296	Tiers of the Kingdom: Video Game Film Adaptations	February 17, 2025
297	Marvel Rivals with Cody Ziglar	February 24, 2025
298	Baldy's Gate	March 3, 2025
299	25 Years of PlayStation 2	March 10, 2025
300	Episode 300: Top 300 Games	March 17, 2025
301	Assassin's Creed Shadows First Impressions + Street Fighter II Documentary	March 24, 2025
302	Two Point Museum with Mike Drucker	March 31, 2025
303	A Minecraft Movie + Nintendo Switch 2 Direct	April 7, 2025
304	The Last of Us and Zombie Games	April 14, 2025
305	Console Draft: Sega Dreamcast	April 21, 2025
306	We Play, You Play: Blue Prince	April 28, 2025
307	Clair Obscur: Expedition 33 + AA Games	May 5, 2025
308	Retrograde: Doom	May 12, 2025
309	Grand Theft Hamlet	May 19, 2025
310	Get This Party Started: RPG Character Draft	May 26, 2025
311	We Play, You Play: Mother 3	June 2, 2025
312	Switch 2 Launch & RIP Switch 1	June 9, 2025
313	Date Everything with Ray Chase	June 16, 2025
314	GameSlop: Nintendo Switch 2 Welcome Tour	June 23, 2025
315	Death Stranding 2: On the Beach First Impressions	June 30, 2025
316	Games of 2025 Part 2	July 7, 2025
317	Tri-Force of Titles	July 14, 2025
318	Donkey Kong Bananza, Fantastic 4 Games + Twisted Metal with Mike Mitchell	July 21, 2025
319	"Board" Games	July 28, 2025
320	Mario Paint	August 4, 2025
321	Tiers of the Kingdom: Video Game Physical Media Formats	August 11, 2025
322	Subnautica and Water Games with Steven Ray Morris	August 18, 2025
323	We Play, You Play: Donkey Kong Bananza	August 25, 2025
324	Gaming on the Road with Zack Mykula	September 1, 2025
325	Death Stranding 2: On the Beach	September 8, 2025
326	40 Years of Super Mario Bros.	September 15, 2025
327	PlayStation's 30th Anniversary	September 22, 2025
328	Gaming in the Modern World with Ben Brock Johnson and Roman Mars	September 29, 2025
329	Hades 2 1.0 & Greek Mythology in Games	October 6, 2025
330	Ghost of Yotei with Erika Ishii	October 13, 2025
331	Mascot Draft with Craig Lee Thomas	October 20, 2025
332	Scariest Gaming Moments	October 27, 2025
333	Game of the Year Watch 2025	November 3, 2025
334	Outer Space Games with Zane Carney	November 10, 2025
335	Mortal Kombat: Legacy Kollection	November 17, 2025
336	20 Years of Xbox 360 + Console Draft	November 24, 2025
337	Day/Night Cycles	December 1, 2025
338	Beat-Em-Ups	December 8, 2025
339	The 2025 Get Played Games of the Spectacular Year Awards	December 15, 2025

=== 2026 ===
No.	Title	Original release date
340	Games of 2026	January 5, 2026
341	Our Favorite Games: Revisited	January 12, 2026
342	Save the Switch 2	January 19, 2026
343	How Did Nick Get Played: Senran Kagura Burst Re:Newal	January 26, 2026
344	40 Years of The Legend of Zelda	February 2, 2026
345	Comic Book Games with Jordan Morris	February 9, 2026
346	High on Life 2 with Alec Robbins and Julian Shine	February 16, 2026
347	Roguelite RPGs with Sam Richardson	February 23, 2026
348	Mewgenics	March 2, 2026
349	Apple Vision Pro + Resident Evil Requiem First Impressions	March 9, 2026
350	Scott Pilgrim EX & Movie Tie In Games with Chris Plante	March 16, 2026
351	30 Years of Resident Evil	March 23, 2026
352	The Super Mario Galaxy Movie Podcast with Jack Black, Benny Safdie, Anya Taylor-Joy, Keegan-Michael Key, Chris Pratt, Charlie Day and Donald Glover	March 30, 2026
353	People of Note with Jason Wishnov	April 6, 2026
354	Get Played in Japan + Devon Torrey Bryant Returns	April 13, 2026
355	Lorelei and the Laser Eyes with Siobhan Thompson	April 20, 2026
356	Tomodachi Life: Living the Dream	April 27, 2026
357	Our Favorite Video Game Performances	May 4, 2026
358	The Ayn Thor Gets Played	May 11, 2026
359	The Year of Yoshi	May 18, 2026
360	Perfect Gaming Day	May 25, 2026
361	007 First Light + Spy Games	June 1, 2026
362	Games of 2026 Part 2	June 8, 2026
363	Soccer Games	June 15, 2026
364	35 Years of Sonic the Hedgehog	June 22, 2026
365	Forza Horizon 6 with Garrick Bernard	June 29, 2026
366	DLC Unlocked: How Did This Get Played?: Bubsy in: The Purrfect Collection	July 6, 2026
367	Catching Up + the Square Enix Cafe & Shop	July 13, 2026
368	Genre Played: Choose Your Fighter	July 20, 2026
369	PaRappa the Rapper with Mike Drucker	July 27, 2026
370	Halo with Cody Ziglar	August 3, 2026
371	Big Walk with Alexis Quasarano	August 10, 2026
372	Let's Get Physical	August 17, 2026
373	Video Game Writing, Helldivers 2, & Ledgerbound with Russ Nickel	August 24, 2026
374	Video Game Anthology Collections	August 31, 2026
375	DLC Unlocked: How Did This Get Played?: Sonic Unleashed with Jordan Morris	September 7, 2026
376	Wolverine in Games	September 14, 2026

== Reception ==
Dan Jakes of The A.V. Club said that the hosts of the show "find a good balance of reviews and riffs." Mark Kramer of Vulture said the hosts of the show "have turned what was once an enjoyable hobby into a masochistic burden."

A 2019 Thanksgiving episode with comedian Joey Clift reviewing Custer's Revenge led to a discussion on how the hosts had tokenized Clift.
