= Josh Fadem =

American comedian (born 1980)

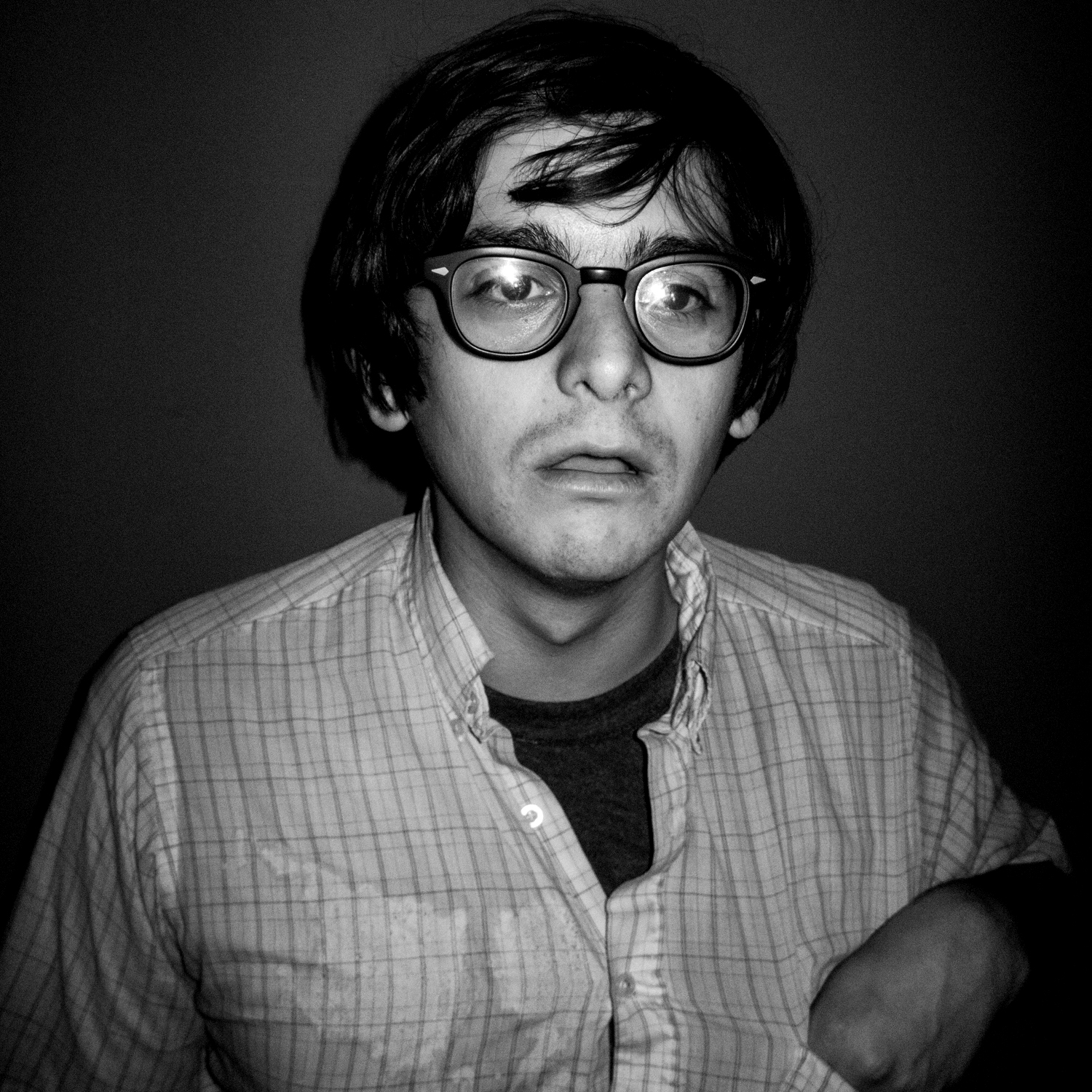
- Fadem in 2012
- Born: July 19, 1980 (age 46); Tulsa, Oklahoma, U.S.
- Occupations: Actor, comedian
- Years active: 2002–present

Josh Fadem (/ˈfeɪdəm/ FADE-əm; born July 19, 1980) is an American actor, writer, and comedian.

== Early life ==
Fadem was born and raised in Tulsa, Oklahoma, where he attended Booker T. Washington High School. He has lived and worked in Los Angeles since 2000.

== Career ==
He is known for playing film student Joey Dixon on the AMC series Better Call Saul and Liz Lemon's agent Simon Barrons on the NBC series 30 Rock. He has appeared on the third season of Twin Peaks as Phil Bisby, Key & Peele, It's Always Sunny in Philadelphia, Comedy Bang! Bang!, and The Whitest Kids U' Know. He starred in the Misfits & Monsters episode "Patsy".

== Filmography ==
=== Film ===
| Year | Title | Role | Notes |
|---|---|---|---|
| 2006 | Big Bad Wolf | Suneel | |
| 2009 | Miss March | Flava Flav Kid | |
| 2009 | The Scenesters | Mumblecore Josh | uncredited |
| 2009 | Calvin Marshall | Simon | |
| 2010 | Made in Romania | Zach Dooley | |
| 2011 | Small Pond | Mike | |
| 2012 | The Master | Young Man | uncredited |
| 2013 | Awful Nice | Deputy Bruce | |
| 2013 | iSteve | Rod Holt | |
| 2013 | Dear Sidewalk | Calvin Benson | |
| 2013 | Mudjackin' | Ian | |
| 2015 | The Dramatics: A Comedy | Erich | |
| 2015 | Amigo Undead | Ian | |
| 2015 | Contracted: Phase II | Mormon #1 | |
| 2015 | Freaks of Nature | Ned | |
| 2017 | Take Me | Background | |
| 2017 | The Feels | Josh | |
| 2018 | Unlovable | Logan | |
| 2019 | The Art of Self-Defense | Serial Killer | |
| 2020 | Valley Girl | Gary | |
| 2020 | For Madmen Only: The Stories of Del Close | John Ostrander | |
| 2021 | King Knight | Neptune | |

=== Television ===
| Year | Title | Role | Notes |
|---|---|---|---|
| 2006 | It's Always Sunny in Philadelphia | Wayne | 1 episode |
| 2006 | Weeds | Reporter | 1 episode |
| 2006 | The Mikes | Clerk | TV movie |
| 2007–2009 | The Whitest Kids U' Know | Various | 3 episodes |
| 2008 | Frank TV | Lost writer | 1 episode |
| 2008–2010 | UCB Comedy Originals | Various | 6 episodes |
| 2008–2012 | The Midnight Show | Sean Penn | 12 episodes |
| 2009 | Reno 911! | Handcuffed Man | 1 episode |
| 2009 | The Burr Effect | Sandwich Artist | TV movie |
| 2009 | Dollhouse | Owen Johnson | 1 episode |
| 2009–2012 | 30 Rock | Simon Barrons | 3 episodes |
| 2011 | Eagleheart | Arnold | 1 episode |
| 2011 | Empires | Sean Seranno | TV movie |
| 2011 | Conan | Distraught Harry Potter Fan | 1 episode |
| 2012 | The Eric Andre Show | Savion Glover | 1 episode |
| 2012–2013 | Key & Peele | Person at People Park #1 / Theater Usher | 2 episodes |
| 2014 | Comedy Bang! Bang! | Marty Sheesh | 1 episode |
| 2014–2023 | American Dad! | Various voices | 13 episodes |
| 2015 | Another Period | Falling Charlie | 2 episodes |
| 2015 | Why? with Hannibal Buress | Fan | 1 episode |
| 2015 | Superstore | Photographer | 2 episodes |
| 2015–2016 | TripTank | Various voices | 4 episodes |
| 2015–2018 | Talking Tom & Friends | Jeremy the Germ (voice) | 3 episodes |
| 2015–2022 | Better Call Saul | Joey Dixon | 15 episodes |
| 2016 | The Crossroads of History | Adolf Hitler | 1 episode |
| 2016 | The Night Shift | Dylan | 1 episode |
| 2016 | Powerless | Marvin | 1 episode |
| 2016 | Live at the Necropolis: The Lords of Synth | Panos the Wonder Child | 1 episode |
| 2016 | Tween Fest | Brian (Dabble Dude) | 1 episode |
| 2016–2018 | The Powerpuff Girls | Various voices | 5 episodes |
| 2017 | Adventure Time | Whipple (voice) | 1 episode |
| 2017 | Jeff & Some Aliens | Dave (voice) | 8 episodes |
| 2017 | Animals | FDB Representative | 1 episode |
| 2017 | Twin Peaks | Phil Bisby | 4 episodes |
| 2017 | Good Game | Panda | 1 episode |
| 2018 | Cute Wars | Host | 5 episodes |
| 2018 | The Story of Our Times | Waiter | TV movie |
| 2018 | Bobcat Goldthwait's Misfits & Monsters | Herbert Smalls | 1 episode |
| 2018 | Heathers | Dathan | 1 episode |
| 2019 | On Becoming a God in Central Florida | Pat Stanley | 5 episodes |
| 2019 | Room 104 | Ted | 1 episode |
| 2021 | Loki | Martin | 1 episode |
| 2021–2022 | Reservation Dogs | Allen Williams, Victor | 2 episodes |
| 2022 | Tulsa King | Elliot Evans | 1 episode |
| 2023 | History of the World, Part II | Private Bryant / Moneylender | 2 episodes |
| 2023 | Minx | Carl Sagan | 1 episode |
| 2024 | The Creep Tapes | Jeremy | 1 episode |
| 2025 | The Lowdown | Abel Bell | 4 episodes |
