= My Horse Prince =

2016 mobile video game

- Developer: Usaya
- Platforms: iOS, Android
- Release: 2016
- Genre: Otome game

My Horse Prince (うまのプリンスさま, Uma no Prince-Sama) is a 2016 Japanese otome game for mobile devices. It was developed by USAYA and was released in Japanese during November 2016 and in English the following month, both for iOS and Android. The game's story follows a young woman who finds herself taking ownership of — and reluctantly falling in love with — a horse with a human head.

== Plot ==
The game's story centers upon a young businesswoman who has spent most of her life working and, as such, has no significant other and low prospects to find one. She decides to leave her job and visit a racing horse ranch, with the assumption that it would be full of handsome young men. When she arrives she is dismayed to find it bereft of potential dating candidates, and is shocked to discover a hot horse named Yuuma with an attractive human face. She questions the ranch owner about this and is told that Yuuma is a normal horse; she just sees a human face because some women born in the year of the horse have the ability to see horses as attractive men. Yuuma and the ranch owner persuade the woman to become the horse's owner against her own better judgement. As she spends more time with Yuuma preparing him for an upcoming race she's surprised and somewhat horrified to find herself falling for him.

== Gameplay ==
My Horse Prince is composed of ten main chapters and three bonus chapters, during which they are directed to increase the horse's affection for the owner by tapping on icons specific to that chapter. Collecting these icons will, however, lower the horse's stamina, which can be increased by briefly talking to the horse. In these conversations, players are given the choice of three answers, each of which will have a different impact on the amount of stamina the horse receives. Selecting a "bad" answer will decrease the horse's stamina and players can undo the selection by opting to watch a video advertisement. At the beginning and end of each chapter, players can view interactions between the game's characters.

Players have the option of spending money in the game by purchasing an option to remove advertisements from the game or by purchasing golden carrots, which will allow the player to temporarily collect icons without reducing stamina.

== Reception ==
My Horse Prince received media attention for its central premise of a zoophilic-esque storyline and for reactions from players on social media. TouchArcade gave the game 3.5 stars out of 5, commenting that it had a "strong localization", but its gameplay was "almost entirely empty". Kotaku called the game "repetitive", but found the story "oddly charming". It was also reviewed in an episode of Angry Video Game Nerd

== See also ==
- Centaur
