= Eric Moneypenny =

American comedian and writer

Eric Moneypenny is an American comedian and writer.

Moneypenny is a writer and performer for The Midnight Show (TMS), a popular monthly sketch comedy showcase at the Upright Citizens Brigade Theater, which has been called "a hot spot to watch simmering talent boil over into commercial success." Some TMS performers are now writers for Saturday Night Live and NBC's Community. With TMS, Moneypenny has worked with some of the top comedians in the business, such as Fred Willard, Andy Richter, The Whitest Kids U' Know, Steve Agee, Ian Roberts, Matt Walsh, Drew Carey, Paul F. Tompkins, Jerry Minor, Paul Scheer, Jerry O'Connell, Michaela Watkins, and many more.

Videos he's written or co-written for TMS have appeared on SportsIllustrated.com, USAToday.com, Comedy Central Insider, and The Huffington Post. He's also written humor columns for FOXSports.com ('04–'07), and commercials co-produced by FunnyOrDie.com & TMS for clients such as Hyatt Hotels and CARFAX. Before joining TMS, he was in the sketch group WPSA, performing at Upright Citizens Brigade Theatre and I.O. West. In college, Moneypenny was Contributing Editor for Ohio University's humor magazine The Shaft, Head Writer for school-produced TV comedy shows Fridays Live and Wits End, and was a National Semifinalist in Comedy Central's Laugh Riots stand-up competition.

Moneypenny also teaches a course in Sketch Comedy Writing in Hollywood, California.
