= Juan Ortiz =

Juan Ortiz may refer to:

- Juan Ortiz (captive), Spaniard held 1528–1539 by Native Americans in Florida
- Juan Esteban Ortiz (born 1987), Colombian footballer
- Juan Ortiz de Matienzo, Spanish colonial judge
- Juan Ortiz de Zárate (c. 1521–1575), Spanish Basque explorer and conquistador
- Juan Ortiz de Zárate (bishop) (1581–1646), Spanish bishop of Salamanca
- Juan David Ortiz, American border patrol agent and convicted serial killer
- Juan Felipe Ortiz (born 1964), Cuban long jumper
- Juan Laurentino Ortiz (1896–1978), Argentine poet
- Juan Manuel Ortiz (disambiguation)
  - Juan Manuel Ortiz (Uruguayan footballer) (born 1982), Uruguayan football forward
  - Juanma Ortiz (footballer, born 1982), Spanish footballer
  - Juanma Ortiz (footballer, born 1986), Spanish football forward
- Juan Ortiz, founder of the musical ensemble mariachi band Campanas de America
- Juan David Ortiz, suspected American Serial Killer
