= 2024 United States Senate election in Texas =

- November 5, 2024
- Turnout: 61.15% ▲ (of registered voters); 49.65% ▲ (of voting age population)
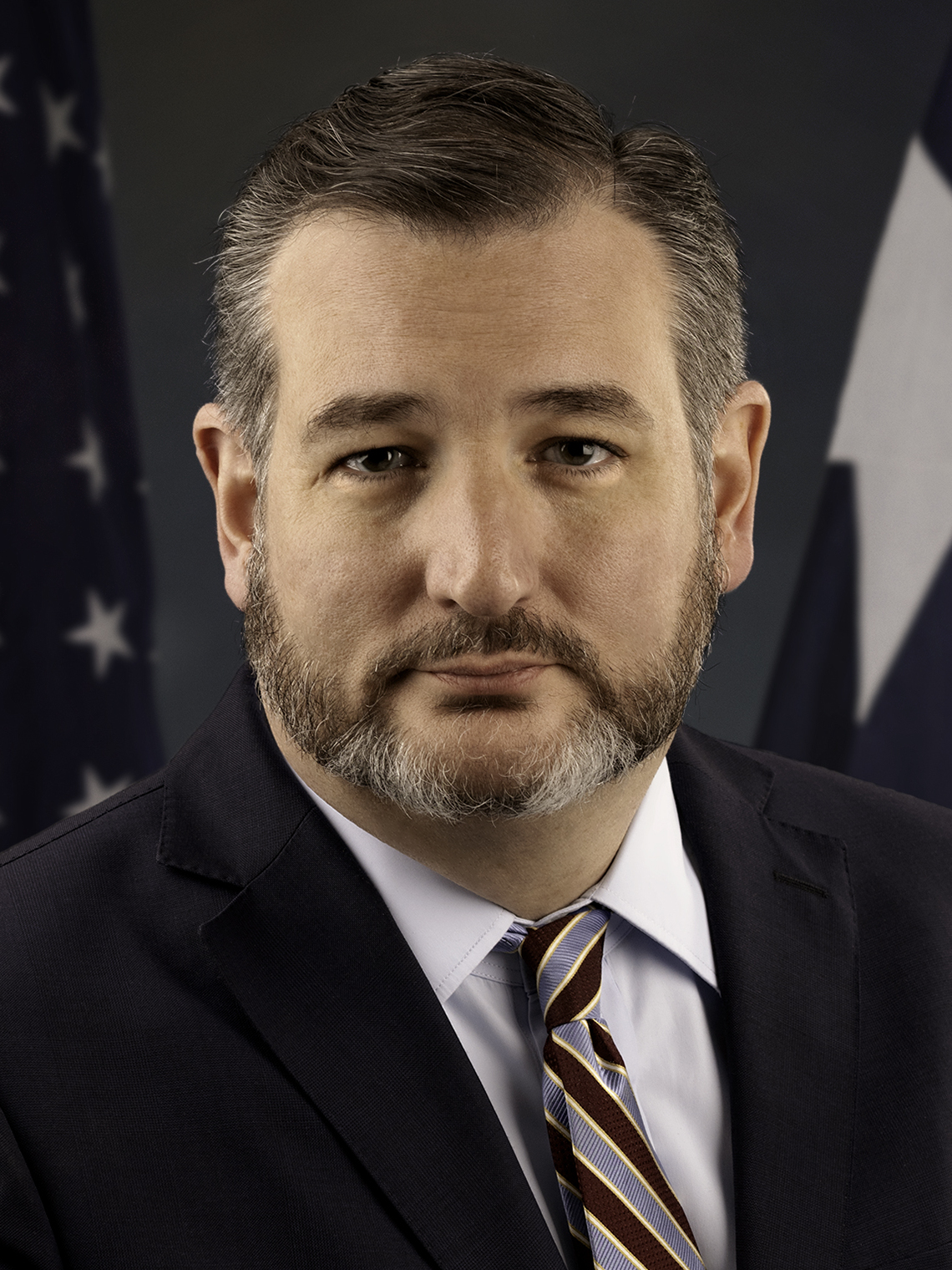

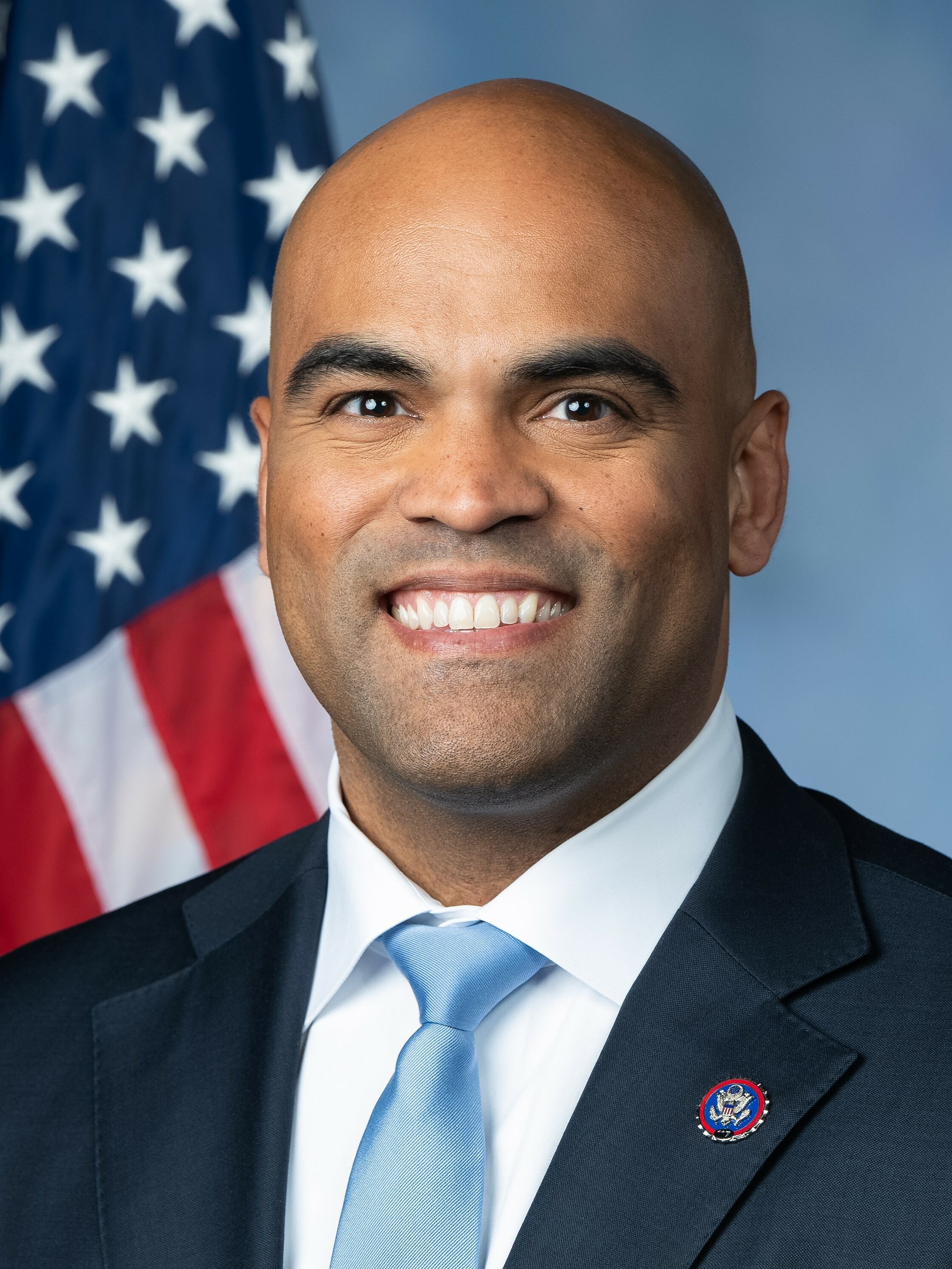
Nominee	Ted Cruz	Colin Allred
Party	Republican	Democratic
Popular vote	5,990,741	5,031,249
Percentage	53.05%	44.56%
- Cruz: 40–50% 50–60% 60–70% 70–80% 80–90% 90–100% Allred: 40–50% 50–60% 60–70% 70–80% 80–90% 90–100% Tie: 40–50% 50% No votes
U.S. senator before election
Ted Cruz
Republican
Elected U.S. senator
Ted Cruz
Republican

The 2024 United States Senate election in Texas was held on November 5, 2024, to elect a member of the United States Senate to represent the state of Texas. Republican senator Ted Cruz was re-elected to a third term, defeating Democratic U.S. representative Colin Allred. The primary election took place on March 5, 2024, during Super Tuesday.

Early polling showed Cruz as a clear favorite, but polls closer to the election showed a closer race. Cruz ultimately outperformed polling and expectations, and won re-election by 8.49%, improving on his 2018 margin by six points and flipping thirteen counties.

== Background ==
Texas was generally considered to be a Republican stronghold, at the time of this election the state had not elected a Democrat to any statewide office since 1994. Republicans controlled both U.S. Senate seats, all statewide offices, both houses of the Texas Legislature, and a large majority in Texas's U.S. House congressional delegation. Cruz was first elected in 2012, defeating Paul Sadler by 16 points and was reelected in 2018 by less than 3 points, narrowly defeating Beto O'Rourke. The close elections in 2018 prompted many electoral analysts to speculate that Texas could become a swing state, but in the 2020 and 2022 elections, Republicans increased their margins of victory. This race was considered to generally favor Cruz, but some considered the race to have the potential to become competitive.

== Republican primary ==
=== Candidates ===
==== Nominee ====
- Ted Cruz, incumbent U.S. senator (2013–present)

==== Eliminated in primary ====
- Holland Gibson, retiree
- Rufus Lopez, attorney

==== Declined ====
- Dan Crenshaw, U.S. representative from Texas's 2nd congressional district (2019–2027) (ran for re-election)
- Adam Kinzinger, former U.S. representative from Illinois's 16th congressional district (2011–2023)

=== Endorsements ===
Ted Cruz

U.S. senators

- Norm Coleman, Minnesota (2003–2009)

Labor unions

- Combined Law Enforcement Associations of Texas

Organizations

- American Israel Public Affairs Committee
- Club for Growth
- National Rifle Association Political Victory Fund
- Republican Jewish Coalition
- Senate Conservatives Fund
- Texas Alliance for Life
- Turning Point Action
- Young Conservatives of Texas

=== Fundraising ===
Campaign finance reports as of June 30, 2024
Candidate	Raised	Spent	Cash on hand
Ted Cruz (R)	$59,159,421	$46,606,430	$12,710,949
Source: Federal Election Commission

=== Polling ===
Poll source	Date(s) administered	Sample size (Note: Key: A – all adults RV – registered voters LV – likely voters V – unclear)	Margin of error	Ted Cruz	Holland Gibson	Rufus Lopez	Other	Undecided
YouGov (Note: Poll sponsored by the Texas Politics Project at the University of Texas)	February 2–12, 2024	492 (RV)	± 4.4%	82%	7%	3%	9%	–

=== Results ===
Results by county: Cruz: 70–80%; 80–90%; >90%

Republican primary results
Party	Candidate	Votes	%
Republican	Ted Cruz (incumbent)	1,977,961	88.30%
Republican	Holland Gibson	134,011	5.98%
Republican	Rufus Lopez	127,986	5.71%
Total votes		2,239,958	100.00%

== Democratic primary ==
=== Candidates ===
==== Nominee ====
- Colin Allred, U.S. representative from Texas's 32nd congressional district (2019–2025)

==== Eliminated in primary ====
- Meri Gomez, tax consultant
- Mark Gonzalez, former Nueces County district attorney (2017–2023)
- Roland Gutierrez, state senator from the 19th district (2021–present)
- Ahmad Hassan, businessman
- Steven Keough, law professor
- Heli Rodriguez-Prilliman, tech entrepreneur
- Carl Sherman, state representative from the 109th district (2019–2025)
- Thierry Tchenko, home repair nonprofit executive and former associate director of the District of Columbia Office of Policy

==== Disqualified ====
- Aaron Arguijo, coffee shop owner

==== Withdrew ====
- John Love III, former Midland city councilor and candidate for U.S. Senate in 2020 (ran for U.S. House)
- Zachariah Manning, businessman (ran for U.S. House)

==== Declined ====
- Julián Castro, former U.S. secretary of housing and urban development (2014–2017), former mayor of San Antonio (2009–2014), and candidate for president of the United States in 2020
- Veronica Escobar, U.S. representative for Texas's 16th congressional district (2019–present) (ran for re-election, endorsed Allred)
- Scott Kelly, retired NASA astronaut and brother of Arizona Senator Mark Kelly

=== Endorsements ===
Colin Allred

US executive branch officials

- Kamala Harris, vice president of the United States (2021–2025)

U.S. senators

- Catherine Cortez Masto, Nevada (2017–present)
- Al Franken, Minnesota (2009–2018)
- Tina Smith, Minnesota (2018–present)
- Jon Tester, Montana (2007–2025)

U.S. representatives

- Veronica Escobar, TX-16 (2019–present)
- Lizzie Fletcher, TX-07 (2019–present)
- Seth Moulton, MA-06 (2015–present)
- Marc Veasey, TX-33 (2013–present)

State legislators

- Cesar Blanco, state senator from the 29th district (2021–present)
- Chris Turner, former minority leader of the Texas House of Representatives (2017–2023) from the 101st district (2013–present)

Local officials

- Rodney Ellis, Harris County commissioner for Precinct 1 (2017–present)
- Clay Jenkins, Dallas County judge (2011–present)
- John Wiley Price, Dallas County commissioner for District 3 (1985–present)
- Sylvester Turner, former mayor of Houston (2016–2024)

Individuals

- Olivia Julianna, activist
- Kelley Robinson, president of Human Rights Campaign

Organizations

- College Democrats of America
- Congressional Black Caucus PAC
- Council for a Livable World
- End Citizens United
- Harvard College Democrats
- Human Rights Campaign
- J Street PAC
- Joint Action Committee for Political Affairs
- League of Conservation Voters
- National Committee to Preserve Social Security and Medicare
- Peace Action

Labor unions

- American Federation of Government Employees
- Association of Flight Attendants
- Texas AFL-CIO
- United Auto Workers

Newspapers and other media

- The Dallas Morning News
- Fort Worth Star-Telegram
- Houston Chronicle
- San Antonio Express-News
Roland Gutierrez

U.S. representatives

- Sylvia Garcia, TX-29 (2019–present)
- Filemon Vela Jr., TX-34 (2013–2022)

State legislators

- Art Fierro, former state representative from the 79th district (2019–2023)
- Penny Morales Shaw, state representative from the 148th district (2021–present)
- Claudia Ordaz, state representative from the 79th district (2023–present)
- José Rodríguez, former Texas Senate minority leader (2015–2020) from the 29th district (2011–2021)

Individuals

- Ramón Ayala, musician

Organizations

- Austin Young Democrats
- Eastside Democrats of El Paso
- Emgage PAC
- Houston LGBTQ+ Political Caucus
- Latino Victory Fund
- Our Revolution Montgomery County
- Stonewall Democrats of San Antonio, Dallas, and El Paso
- Texas Progressive Caucus
- University of Texas at Austin College Democrats (University Democrats)

Newspapers

- The Austin Chronicle
Declined to endorse

Organizations

- Congressional Hispanic Caucus BOLD PAC
- Democratic Senatorial Campaign Committee
- Stonewall Democrats of Austin

=== Fundraising ===
Campaign finance reports as of June 30, 2024
Candidate	Raised	Spent	Cash on hand
Colin Allred (D)	$38,433,747	$27,983,265	$10,450,482
Mark Gonzalez (D)	$14,967 (Note: $3,900 of this total was self-funded by Gonzalez)	$11,659	$3,307
Roland Gutierrez (D)	$1,301,543	$1,146,487	$155,055
Steven Keough (D)	$27,357 (Note: $6,050 of this total was self-funded by Keough)	$27,730	$0
Heli Rodriguez-Prilliman (D)	$30,458	$29,440	$1,017
Carl Sherman (D)	$173,565	$150,616	$22,949
Thierry Tchenko (D)	$117,067	$106,606	$10,461
Source: Federal Election Commission

=== Polling ===
Poll source	Date(s) administered	Sample size	Margin of error	Colin Allred	Meri Gomez	Mark Gonzalez	Roland Gutierrez	Carl Sherman	Other	Undecided
UT Tyler	February 18–26, 2024	441 (LV)	± 5.3%	37%	–	–	22%	6%	2%	32%
YouGov	February 2–12, 2024	354 (RV)	± 5.2%	52%	3%	5%	14%	2%	5% (Note: Steven Keough with 3%; Heli Rodriguez-Prilliman and Thierry Tchenko with 1%; Robert Hassan with 0%)	18%
YouGov (Note: Poll sponsored by the Hobby School of Public Affairs at the University of Houston)	January 11–24, 2024	1,500 (LV)	± 2.5%	40%	4%	2%	12%	1%	3% (Note: Robert Hassan, Steven Keough, and Heli Rodriguez-Prilliman with 1%; Thierry Tchenko with 0%)	38%
Emerson College (Note: Poll sponsored by Nexstar Media Group)	January 13–15, 2024	460 (RV)	± 4.8%	29%	4%	6%	7%	2%	15% (Note: Steven Keough, Heli Rodriguez-Prilliman, and Thierry Tchenko with 2%; Robert Hassan with 1%; "Someone else" with 8%)	37%
YouGov	December 1–10, 2023	415 (RV)	± 4.8%	28%	3%	2%	7%	2%	10% (Note: Sherri Taylor, Victor Dunn, and John Love III with 2%; Tracy Andrus, Aaron Arguijo, and Steven Keough with 1%; Teresa Naranjo, Heli Rodriguez-Prilliman, and Thierry Tchenko with 0%; "Someone else" with 1%)	48%
YouGov	October 5–17, 2023	409 (RV)	± 4.8%	21%	2%	2%	10%	2%	15% (Note: Sherri Taylor with 3%; Tracy Andrus, Steven Keough, Teresa Naranjo, and Thierry Tchenko with 2%; Aaron Arguijo, John Love III, and Heli Rodriguez-Prilliman with 1%; Victor Dunn with 0%; "Someone else" with 1%)	46%
Texas Hispanic Policy Foundation	May 8–17, 2023	1,000 (RV)	± 2.9%	33%	–	–	22%	–	4% (Note: John Love with 4%)	41%

=== Results ===
Results by county: Allred: 20–30%; 30–40%; 40–50%; 50–60%; 60–70%; 70–80%; 80–90%; >90%; Gutierrez: 20–30%; 30–40%; 40–50%; 50–60%; 60–70%; Gonzalez: 30–40%; 40–50%; 50–60%; >90%; Gomez: 20–30%; Tied No Votes

Democratic primary results
Party	Candidate	Votes	%
Democratic	Colin Allred	569,585	58.87%
Democratic	Roland Gutierrez	160,978	16.64%
Democratic	Mark Gonzalez	85,228	8.81%
Democratic	Meri Gomez	44,166	4.56%
Democratic	Carl Sherman	31,694	3.28%
Democratic	Robert Hassan	21,855	2.26%
Democratic	Steven Keough	21,801	2.25%
Democratic	Heli Rodriguez-Prilliman	18,801	1.94%
Democratic	Thierry Tchenko	13,395	1.38%
Total votes		967,503	100.00%

== Libertarian convention ==
=== Nominee ===
- Ted Brown, insurance adjuster and nominee for Texas's 17th congressional district in 2020

== Write-in candidates ==
=== Declared ===
- Tracy Andrus, director of the Lee P. Brown Criminal Justice Institute at Wiley University
- Analisa Roche, math tutor

== General election ==
=== Predictions ===
Source	Ranking	As of
The Cook Political Report	Lean R	October 1, 2024
Inside Elections	Tilt R	October 31, 2024
Fox News	Likely R	October 1, 2024
Sabato's Crystal Ball	Lean R	November 4, 2024
Decision Desk HQ/The Hill	Lean R	August 26, 2024
Elections Daily	Lean R	November 4, 2024
CNalysis	Tilt R	October 23, 2024
RealClearPolitics	Tossup	October 30, 2024
Split Ticket	Lean R	October 23, 2024
538	Likely R	October 23, 2024

=== Post-primary endorsements ===
Ted Cruz (R)

U.S. executive branch officials

- John Bolton, national security advisor (2018–2019), United States ambassador to the United Nations (2005–2006)
- Donald Trump, 45th president of the United States (2017–2021)

U.S. senators

- John Thune, Senate minority whip (2021–2025) from South Dakota (2005–present)

State legislators

- Eddie Lucio Jr., Texas senator (1991–2023) (Democratic)

Local officials

- Kim Ogg, Harris County district attorney (2017–2024) (Democratic)

Individuals

- Ben Shapiro, editor emeritus of The Daily Wire

Organizations

- U.S. Chamber of Commerce
Colin Allred (D)

U.S. executive branch officials

- Kamala Harris, 49th vice president of the United States (2021–2025), 2024 nominee for president of the United States
- Barack Obama, 44th president of the United States (2009–2017)
- Robert Reich, former U.S. secretary of labor (1993–1997)

U.S. senators

- Gary Peters, Michigan (2015–present)

U.S. representatives

- Liz Cheney, U.S. representative from Wyoming's at-large congressional district (2017–2023) (Republican)
- Gabby Giffords, U.S. representative from Arizona's 8th congressional district (2007–2012)
- Adam Kinzinger, U.S. representative from Illinois (2011–2023) (Republican)
- Alan Steelman, U.S. representative from Texas's 5th congressional district (1973–1977) (Republican)

Statewide officials

- Tim Walz, governor of Minnesota (2019–present), 2024 nominee for vice president of the United States
- Gretchen Whitmer, governor of Michigan (2019–present)

State legislators

- Adrian Boafo, Maryland state delegate from the 23rd district (2023–present)
- Bennett Ratliff, Texas state representative (2013–2015) (Republican)
- Todd Smith, Texas state representative (1997–2013) (Republican)
- James Talarico, Texas state representative from the 50th district (2018–present)
- Jason Villalba, Texas state representative (2013–2019) (Republican)

Local officials

- Steve Bartlett, mayor of Dallas (1991–1995) (Republican)
- Ron Nirenberg, mayor of San Antonio (2017–2025) (Independent)
- Glen Whitley, Tarrant County judge (2007–2022) (Republican)

Individuals

- Mark Cuban, businessperson, television personality and minority owner of Dallas Mavericks (Independent)
- Harry Dunn, former U.S. Capitol Police officer
- Willie Nelson, country singer

Newspapers

- Austin American-Statesman
- The Austin Chronicle
- The Dallas Morning News
- Fort Worth Star-Telegram
- Houston Chronicle
- San Antonio Express-News

Organizations

- Alliance for Retired Americans
- Black Economic Alliance PAC
- Giffords
- J Street
- People for the American Way

=== Fundraising ===
Campaign finance reports as of October 16, 2024
Candidate	Raised	Spent	Cash on hand
Ted Cruz (R)	$86,316,192	$76,908,816	$9,565,334
Colin Allred (D)	$80,059,292	$77,557,763	$2,501,528
Source: Federal Election Commission

=== Debate ===
2024 Texas U.S. Senate election debate
No.	Date	Host	Moderators	Link	Republican	Democratic
Key: P Participant A Absent N Not invited I Invited W Withdrawn						
Key: P Participant A Absent N Not invited I Invited W Withdrawn					Cruz	Allred
1	October 15, 2024	WFAA		YouTube	P	P

=== Polling ===
Aggregate polls

Source of poll aggregation	Dates administered	Dates updated	Ted Cruz (R)	Colin Allred (D)	Undecided (Note: Calculated by taking the difference of 100% and all other candidates combined.)	Margin
FiveThirtyEight	through November 4, 2024	November 4, 2024	49.4%	45.4%	5.2%	Cruz +4.0%
RCP	October 22 - November 4, 2024	November 4, 2024	49.2%	44.8%	6.0%	Cruz +4.4%
270toWin	October 18 - November 3, 2024	November 3, 2024	49.0%	45.2%	5.8%	Cruz +3.8%
TheHill/DDHQ	through November 4, 2024	November 4, 2024	49.8%	46.0%	4.2%	Cruz +3.8%
Average			49.4%	45.4%	5.2%	Cruz +4.0%

Poll source	Date(s) administered	Sample size	Margin of error	Ted Cruz (R)	Colin Allred (D)	Other	Undecided
AtlasIntel	November 1–4, 2024	2,434 (LV)	± 2.0%	53%	46%	1%	–
Morning Consult	October 22–31, 2024	2,120 (LV)	± 2.0%	47%	44%	–	9%
Cygnal (R)	October 26–28, 2024	600 (LV)	± 4.0%	49%	45%	3% (Note: Brown (L) with 3%)	3%
ActiVote	October 21–27, 2024	400 (LV)	± 4.9%	52%	48%	–	–
New York Times/Siena College	October 23–26, 2024	1,180 (LV)	± 3.3%	50%	46%	–	4%
New York Times/Siena College	October 23–26, 2024	1,180 (RV)	± 3.1%	49%	46%	–	5%
Rasmussen Reports (R) (Note: Poll sponsored by American Thinker)	October 24–25, 2024	1,002 (LV)	± 3.0%	47%	43%	3%	7%
GBAO (D) (Note: Poll sponsored by Allred's campaign)	October 18–23, 2024	800 (LV)	± 3.5%	46%	46%	4% (Note: Brown (L) with 4%)	4%
Emerson College (Note: Poll sponsored by The Hill and Nexstar)	October 18–21, 2024	815 (LV)	± 3.4%	48%	47%	–	5%
UT Tyler	October 14–21, 2024	956 (LV)	± 3.0%	47%	45%	3%	6%
YouGov (Note: Poll sponsored by Rose Institute of State and Local Government)	October 7–17, 2024	1,108 (RV)	± 3.5%	49%	45%	–	6%
ActiVote	October 1–16, 2024	400 (LV)	± 4.9%	53%	47%	–	–
Morning Consult	October 6–15, 2024	2,048 (LV)	–	46%	45%	–	9%
YouGov	October 2–10, 2024	1,091 (LV)	± 3.0%	51%	44%	4%	–
University of Houston	September 26 – October 10, 2024	1,329 (LV)	± 2.7%	50%	46%	1% (Note: Brown (L) with 1%)	3%
Marist College	October 3–7, 2024	1,186 (LV)	± 3.6%	51%	46%	–	3%
Marist College	October 3–7, 2024	1,365 (RV)	± 3.3%	50%	47%	–	3%
Mainstreet Research/FAU	October 2–6, 2024	811 (RV)	± 3.4%	46%	43%	–	11%
Mainstreet Research/FAU	October 2–6, 2024	775 (LV)	± 3.4%	47%	44%	–	9%
New York Times/Siena College	September 29 – October 4, 2024	617 (LV)	± 4.8%	48%	44%	–	8%
New York Times/Siena College	September 29 – October 4, 2024	617 (RV)	± 4.5%	45%	43%	–	12%
GBAO (D)	Early October 2024	800 (LV)	± 3.5%	46%	44%	6% (Note: Brown (L) with 6%)	4%
ActiVote	September 5–30, 2024	400 (LV)	± 4.9%	52%	48%	–	–
RMG Research (Note: Poll sponsored by Napolitan Institute)	September 25–27, 2024	779 (LV)	± 3.5%	48%	45%	4% (Note: "Someone else" with 3%; "Wouldn't vote" with 1%)	3%
RMG Research	September 25–27, 2024	779 (LV)	± 3.5%	50% (Note: With voters who lean towards a given candidate)	47%	4% (Note: "Wouldn't vote" and "Someone else" with 2%)	–
Public Policy Polling (Note: Poll sponsored by Clean and Prosperous America PAC, which supports Democratic candidates)	September 25–26, 2024	759 (RV)	± 3.5%	47%	46%	–	7%
Public Policy Polling	September 25–26, 2024	759 (RV)	± 3.5%	45%	43%	3%	9%
Emerson College	September 22–24, 2024	950 (LV)	± 3.1%	49%	45%	–	6%
Texas Hispanic Policy Foundation	September 13–18, 2024	1,200 (LV)	± 2.8%	48%	45%	–	7%
Morning Consult	September 9–18, 2024	2,716 (LV)	± 2.0%	44%	45%	–	11%
CWS Research (R) (Note: Poll sponsored by Texas Gun Rights, which supports Republican candidates)	September 4–9, 2024	504 (LV)	± 4.4%	46%	40%	3%	11%
Morning Consult	August 30 – September 8, 2024	2,940 (LV)	± 2.0%	47%	42%	–	11%
Emerson College	September 3–5, 2024	845 (LV)	± 3.3%	48%	44%	–	8%
GBAO (D)	September 2024	800 (LV)	± 3.5%	48%	43%	4%	5%
YouGov	August 23–31, 2024	1,200 (RV)	± 2.8%	44%	36%	6% (Note: "Someone else" with 4%; Brown (L) with 2%)	14%
Quantus Insights (R)	August 29–30, 2024	1,000 (RV)	± 3.1%	50%	43%	3%	4%
Texas Public Opinion Research/ Lake Research Partners (D)	August 24–29, 2024	800 (RV)	± 3.5%	47%	43%	7% (Note: Brown (L) with 5%; "Refused" with 1%)	3%
ActiVote	August 13–29, 2024	400 (LV)	± 4.9%	55%	45%	–	–
Public Policy Polling (D)	August 21–22, 2024	725 (RV)	± 3.6%	47%	45%	–	8%
Public Policy Polling (D)	August 21–22, 2024	725 (RV)	± 3.6%	44%	40%	4%	12%
YouGov (Note: Poll sponsored by the University of Houston and Texas Southern University)	August 5–16, 2024	1,365 (LV)	± 2.7%	47%	45%	3%	6%
ActiVote	June 25 – July 18, 2024	400 (LV)	± 4.9%	54%	46%	–	–
Remington Research Group (R) (Note: Poll sponsored by American Fuel & Petrochemical Manufacturers, which supports Republican candidates)	June 29 – July 1, 2024	589 (LV)	± 4.0%	53%	43%	–	4%
YouGov	June 20 – July 1, 2024	1,484 (LV)	± 2.5%	47%	44%	3%	6%
Manhattan Institute	June 25–27, 2024	600 (LV)	± 4.0%	46%	43%	3% (Note: "Someone else" with 3%)	8%
UT Tyler	June 11–20, 2024	1,144 (RV)	± 3.7%	43%	39%	7% (Note: Brown (L) with 5%; "Refused" with 2%)	10%
UT Tyler	June 11–20, 2024	931 (LV)	± 3.8%	45%	42%	7%	7%
YouGov	May 31 – June 9, 2024	1,200 (RV)	± 2.8%	45%	34%	6%	15%
GBAO (D)	May 2024	800 (LV)	± 3.5%	47%	40%	8% (Note: Brown (L) with 8%)	5%
YouGov	April 12–22, 2024	1,200 (RV)	± 2.8%	46%	33%	7%	22%
Texas Lyceum	April 12–21, 2024	926 (RV)	± 3.2%	41%	31%	13%	15%
Texas Hispanic Policy Foundation	April 5–10, 2024	1,600 (LV)	± 2.5%	46%	41%	4%	9%
Cygnal (R)	April 4–6, 2024	1,000 (RV)	± 2.9%	45%	36%	5% (Note: Brown (L) with 3%; Mason Cysewski (G) with 2%)	14%
Marist College	March 18–21, 2024	1,117 (RV)	± 3.8%	51%	45%	1%	3%
UT Tyler	February 18–26, 2024	1,167 (RV)	± 3.2%	41%	41%	7%	12%
YouGov	February 2–12, 2024	1,200 (RV)	± 3.5%	46%	32%	9%	13%
National Public Affairs	February 6–8, 2024	807 (LV)	± 3.5%	44%	44%	–	12%
YouGov	January 11–24, 2024	1,145 (RV)	± 2.5%	48%	39%	4%	9%
Emerson College	January 13–15, 2024	1,315 (RV)	± 2.6%	42%	40%	8%	11%
YouGov	December 1–10, 2023	1,200 (RV)	± 2.4%	43%	27%	15% (Note: "Someone else" with 15%)	15%
UT Tyler	May 10–21, 2023	1,413 (RV)	± 3.0%	42%	37%	8% (Note: "Someone else" with 7%; Refused to answer with 1%)	14%
Texas Hispanic Policy Foundation	May 8–17, 2023	1,000 (RV)	± 2.9%	47%	40%	4% (Note: Libertarian Party candidate with 2%; Green Party candidate with 2%)	9%

Hypothetical polling

Ted Cruz vs. Roland Gutierrez

Poll source	Date(s) administered	Sample size	Margin of error	Ted Cruz (R)	Roland Gutierrez (D)	Other	Undecided
YouGov	February 2–12, 2024	1,200 (RV)	± 3.5%	45%	31%	9%	14%
YouGov	January 11–24, 2024	1,145 (RV)	± 2.5%	48%	38%	4%	10%
Emerson College	January 13–15, 2024	1,315 (RV)	± 2.6%	41%	40%	8%	11%
YouGov	December 1–10, 2023	1,200 (RV)	± 2.4%	42%	26%	16% (Note: "Someone else" with 16%)	17%

=== Results ===
2024 United States Senate election in Texas
Party	Candidate	Votes	%	±%
Republican	Ted Cruz (incumbent)	5,990,741	53.05%	+2.18%
Democratic	Colin Allred	5,031,249	44.56%	−3.76%
Libertarian	Ted Brown	267,039	2.36%	+1.59%
Write-in		2,825	0.03%	
Total votes		11,291,854	100.00%	
Republican hold				

==== By county ====
County	Ted Cruz Republican		Colin Allred Democratic		Various candidates Other parties		Margin		Total
County	#	%	#	%	#	%	#	%	Total
Anderson	15,022	78.17%	3,872	20.15%	322	1.68%	11,150	58.02%	19,216
Andrews	4,976	84.32%	873	14.62%	123	2.06%	4,103	69.70%	5,972
Angelina	24,994	73.37%	8,382	24.61%	690	2.03%	16,612	48.76%	34,066
Aransas	9,605	74.14%	3,069	23.69%	282	2.18%	6,536	50.45%	12,956
Archer	4,483	87.75%	562	11.00%	64	1.25%	3,921	76.75%	5,109
Armstrong	1,001	90.02%	97	8.72%	14	1.26%	904	81.30%	1,112
Atascosa	11,973	65.94%	5,739	31.61%	446	2.46%	6,234	34.33%	18,158
Austin	11,981	78.36%	2,998	19.61%	310	2.03%	8,983	58.75%	15,289
Bailey	1,352	78.93%	325	18.97%	36	2.10%	1,027	59.95%	1,713
Bandera	10,472	77.40%	2,735	20.21%	323	2.39%	7,737	57.18%	13,530
Bastrop	21,835	55.35%	16,445	41.69%	1,166	2.96%	5,390	13.66%	39,446
Baylor	1,433	85.71%	199	11.90%	40	2.39%	1,234	82.80%	1,672
Bee	5,639	65.03%	2,845	32.81%	188	2.17%	2,794	32.22%	8,672
Bell	70,468	54.47%	55,441	42.85%	3,463	2.68%	15,027	11.62%	129,372
Bexar	303,262	39.88%	422,903	55.61%	34,298	4.51%	−119,641	−15.73%	760,463
Blanco	6,243	73.47%	2,071	24.37%	183	2.15%	4,172	49.10%	8,497
Borden	366	95.56%	13	3.39%	4	1.04%	353	92.17%	383
Bosque	7,643	80.01%	1,712	17.92%	198	2.07%	5,931	62.09%	9,553
Bowie	26,219	72.43%	9,405	25.98%	573	1.58%	16,814	46.45%	36,197
Brazoria	90,208	55.88%	67,075	41.55%	4,163	2.58%	23,133	14.33%	161,446
Brazos	54,153	59.03%	34,849	37.98%	2,743	2.99%	19,304	21.04%	91,745
Brewster	2,422	53.30%	1,998	43.97%	124	2.73%	424	9.33%	4,544
Briscoe	649	87.23%	79	10.62%	16	2.15%	570	76.61%	744
Brooks	874	37.97%	1,379	59.90%	49	2.13%	−505	−21.94%	2,302
Brown	14,108	84.08%	2,359	14.06%	313	1.87%	11,749	70.02%	16,780
Burleson	7,327	78.61%	1,805	19.36%	189	2.03%	5,522	59.24%	9,321
Burnet	21,056	74.97%	6,401	22.79%	629	2.24%	14,655	52.18%	28,086
Caldwell	8,227	52.94%	6,851	44.08%	463	2.98%	1,376	8.85%	15,541
Calhoun	5,603	72.22%	2,018	26.01%	137	1.77%	3,585	46.21%	7,758
Callahan	5,973	85.62%	863	12.37%	140	2.01%	5,110	73.25%	6,976
Cameron	53,391	46.63%	58,330	50.94%	2,789	2.44%	−4,939	−4.31%	114,510
Camp	3,894	74.51%	1,257	24.05%	75	1.44%	2,637	50.46%	5,226
Carson	2,755	87.43%	328	10.41%	68	2.16%	2,427	77.02%	3,151
Cass	11,477	81.30%	2,457	17.40%	183	1.30%	9,020	63.89%	14,117
Castro	1,530	77.12%	408	20.56%	46	2.32%	1,122	56.55%	1,984
Chambers	19,746	79.37%	4,617	18.56%	514	2.07%	15,129	60.82%	24,877
Cherokee	16,065	78.78%	3,915	19.20%	413	2.02%	12,150	59.58%	20,393
Childress	1,919	85.52%	285	12.70%	40	1.78%	1,634	72.82%	2,244
Clay	5,128	87.23%	663	11.28%	88	1.50%	4,465	75.95%	5,879
Cochran	706	80.23%	149	16.93%	25	2.84%	557	63.30%	880
Coke	1,567	86.86%	218	12.08%	19	1.05%	1,349	74.78%	1,804
Coleman	3,585	86.97%	470	11.40%	67	1.64%	3,115	75.57%	4,122
Collin	263,381	51.51%	236,579	46.27%	11,313	2.21%	26,802	5.24%	511,273
Collingsworth	1,039	87.98%	141	11.94%	1	0.08%	898	76.04%	1,181
Colorado	7,554	76.16%	2,207	22.25%	158	1.59%	5,347	53.91%	9,919
Comal	71,757	69.45%	29,149	28.21%	2,418	2.34%	42,608	41.24%	103,324
Comanche	5,435	83.54%	962	14.79%	109	1.68%	4,473	68.75%	6,506
Concho	989	83.53%	176	14.86%	19	1.60%	813	68.67%	1,184
Cooke	16,284	80.22%	3,620	17.83%	395	1.95%	12,664	62.39%	20,299
Coryell	15,775	66.35%	7,276	30.60%	726	3.05%	8,499	35.74%	23,777
Cottle	544	84.60%	90	14.00%	9	1.40%	454	70.61%	643
Crane	1,115	83.33%	196	14.65%	27	2.02%	919	68.68%	1,338
Crockett	1,008	73.42%	328	23.89%	37	2.69%	680	49.53%	1,373
Crosby	1,370	73.66%	438	23.55%	52	2.80%	932	50.11%	1,860
Culberson	394	52.89%	340	45.64%	11	1.48%	54	7.25%	745
Dallam	1,229	75.15%	158	11.09%	38	2.67%	1,071	75.16%	1,425
Dallas	291,528	34.61%	531,153	63.05%	19,744	2.34%	-239,625	-28.44%	842,425
Dawson	2,686	77.74%	688	19.91%	81	2.34%	1,998	57.83%	3,455
Deaf Smith	3,113	73.68%	1,025	24.26%	87	2.06%	2,088	49.42%	4,225
Delta	2,158	81.28%	453	17.06%	44	1.66%	1,705	64.22%	2,655
Denton	237,978	53.07%	200,676	44.75%	9,805	2.19%	37,302	8.32%	448,459
DeWitt	6,240	80.52%	1,392	17.96%	118	1.52%	4,848	62.55%	7,750
Dickens	817	83.11%	148	15.06%	18	1.83%	669	68.06%	983
Dimmit	1,305	40.24%	1,849	57.02%	89	2.74%	-544	-16.77%	3,243
Donley	1,453	87.01%	192	11.50%	25	1.50%	1,261	75.51%	1,670
Duval	1,872	44.82%	2,190	52.43%	115	2.75%	-318	-7.61%	4,177
Eastland	7,132	85.89%	1,026	12.36%	146	1.76%	6,106	73.53%	8,304
Ector	30,729	72.70%	10,620	25.13%	919	2.17%	20,109	47.57%	42,268
Edwards	800	82.14%	152	15.61%	22	2.26%	648	66.53%	974
El Paso	92,997	37.96%	141,826	57.89%	10,164	4.15%	-48,829	-19.93%	244,987
Ellis	61,020	61.78%	35,685	36.13%	2,070	2.10%	25,335	25.65%	98,775
Erath	14,672	80.71%	3,126	17.20%	380	2.09%	11,546	63.52%	18,178
Falls	4,351	69.44%	1,782	28.44%	133	2.12%	2,569	41.00%	6,266
Fannin	13,084	80.08%	2,927	17.92%	327	2.00%	10,157	62.17%	16,338
Fayette	10,408	78.34%	2,649	19.94%	228	1.72%	7,759	58.40%	13,285
Fisher	1,420	78.37%	358	19.76%	34	1.88%	1,062	58.61%	1,812
Floyd	1,617	78.12%	406	19.61%	47	2.27%	1,211	58.50%	2,070
Foard	438	81.41%	94	17.47%	6	1.12%	344	63.94%	538
Fort Bend	159,691	44.84%	186,710	52.43%	9,740	2.73%	-27,019	-7.59%	356,141
Franklin	4,349	82.43%	859	16.29%	68	1.29%	3,490	66.15%	5,276
Freestone	7,197	80.35%	1,601	17.87%	159	1.78%	5,596	62.48%	8,957
Frio	2,557	52.98%	2,039	42.25%	240	4.97%	518	10.73%	4,826
Gaines	5,700	89.52%	561	8.81%	106	1.66%	5,139	80.71%	6,367
Galveston	95,114	60.05%	59,316	37.45%	3,962	2.50%	35,798	22.60%	158,392
Garza	1,318	84.00%	223	14.21%	28	1.78%	1,095	69.79%	1,569
Gillespie	12,881	78.01%	3,296	19.96%	334	2.02%	9,585	58.05%	16,511
Glasscock	616	93.33%	37	5.61%	7	1.06%	579	87.73%	660
Goliad	3,016	76.51%	853	21.64%	73	1.85%	2,163	54.87%	3,942
Gonzales	5,607	73.44%	1,849	24.22%	179	2.34%	3,758	49.22%	7,635
Gray	6,489	86.29%	878	11.68%	153	2.03%	5,611	74.61%	7,520
Grayson	48,504	74.31%	15,453	23.67%	1,319	2.02%	33,051	50.63%	65,276
Gregg	31,862	68.51%	13,660	29.37%	983	2.11%	18,202	39.14%	46,505
Grimes	10,830	77.41%	2,900	20.73%	261	1.86%	7,930	56.68%	13,991
Guadalupe	50,972	64.08%	30,981	34.66%	2,159	2.57%	19,991	23.77%	84,112
Hale	6,941	75.49%	2,013	21.89%	241	2.62%	4,928	53.59%	9,195
Hall	957	84.61%	155	13.71%	19	1.68%	802	70.91%	1,131
Hamilton	3,699	82.68%	679	15.18%	96	2.15%	3,020	67.50%	4,474
Hansford	1,802	91.06%	147	7.43%	30	1.52%	1,655	83.63%	1,979
Hardeman	1,163	83.19%	217	15.52%	18	1.29%	946	67.67%	1,398
Hardin	23,992	85.48%	3,603	12.84%	473	1.69%	20,389	72.64%	28,068
Harris	666,027	43.00%	841,784	54.35%	41,103	2.65%	-175,757	-11.35%	1,548,914
Harrison	22,137	73.60%	7,408	24.63%	534	1.78%	14,729	48.97%	30,079
Hartley	1,817	90.62%	172	8.58%	16	0.80%	1,645	82.04%	2,005
Haskell	1,826	81.74%	363	16.25%	45	2.01%	1,463	65.49%	2,234
Hays	54,436	43.35%	67,475	53.73%	3,665	2.92%	-13,039	-10.38%	125,576
Hemphill	1,380	86.30%	195	12.20%	24	1.50%	1,185	74.11%	1,599
Henderson	30,047	78.60%	7,453	19.50%	726	1.90%	22,594	59.11%	38,226
Hidalgo	96,208	45.46%	110,139	52.05%	5,275	2.49%	-13,931	-6.58%	211,622
Hill	13,104	78.67%	3,223	19.35%	331	1.99%	9,881	59.32%	16,658
Hockley	6,437	80.92%	1,355	17.03%	163	2.05%	5,082	63.88%	7,955
Hood	29,112	79.84%	6,604	18.11%	747	2.05%	22,508	61.73%	36,463
Hopkins	13,269	79.43%	3,142	18.81%	294	1.76%	10,127	60.62%	16,705
Houston	7,033	75.75%	2,104	22.66%	148	1.59%	4,929	53.09%	9,285
Howard	7,388	77.67%	1,895	19.92%	229	2.41%	5,493	57.75%	9,512
Hudspeth	702	68.82%	285	27.94%	33	3.24%	417	40.88%	1,020
Hunt	34,351	74.02%	11,067	23.85%	991	2.13%	23,284	50.17%	46,409
Hutchinson	7,047	86.28%	946	11.58%	175	2.14%	6,101	74.69%	8,168
Irion	732	84.43%	118	13.61%	17	1.96%	614	70.82%	867
Jack	3,689	88.23%	427	10.21%	65	1.55%	3,262	78.02%	4,181
Jackson	5,222	82.89%	998	15.84%	80	1.27%	4,224	67.05%	6,300
Jasper	12,842	81.56%	2,702	17.16%	201	1.28%	10,140	64.40%	15,745
Jeff Davis	671	58.10%	447	38.70%	37	3.20%	224	19.40%	1,155
Jefferson	43,888	51.66%	39,643	46.66%	1,425	1.68%	4,245	5.00%	84,956
Jim Hogg	586	38.58%	917	60.37%	16	1.05%	-331	-21.79%	1,519
Jim Wells	6,773	52.26%	5,895	45.49%	292	2.25%	878	6.77%	12,960
Johnson	57,382	71.44%	20,935	26.06%	2,006	2.50%	36,447	45.38%	80,323
Jones	5,729	83.02%	1,039	15.06%	133	1.93%	4,690	67.96%	6,901
Karnes	3,743	74.71%	1,175	23.45%	92	1.84%	2,568	51.26%	5,010
Kaufman	41,177	59.83%	26,235	38.12%	1,414	2.05%	14,942	21.71%	68,826
Kendall	22,068	75.37%	6,666	22.77%	546	1.86%	15,402	52.60%	29,280
Kenedy	92	63.89%	48	33.33%	4	2.78%	44	30.56%	144
Kent	383	85.49%	58	12.95%	7	1.56%	325	72.54%	448
Kerr	20,840	74.11%	6,672	23.73%	610	2.17%	14,168	50.38%	28,122
Kimble	2,039	85.71%	298	12.53%	42	1.77%	1,741	73.18%	2,379
King	129	96.27%	5	3.73%	0	0.00%	124	92.54%	134
Kinney	970	69.94%	390	28.12%	27	1.95%	580	41.82%	1,387
Kleberg	5,047	51.02%	4,614	46.64%	232	2.35%	433	4.38%	9,893
Knox	1,096	80.35%	249	18.25%	19	1.39%	847	62.10%	1,364
Lamar	16,454	77.96%	4,344	20.58%	308	1.46%	12,110	57.38%	21,106
Lamb	3,285	79.92%	729	17.73%	97	2.36%	2,556	62.17%	4,111
Lampasas	8,606	76.92%	2,314	20.68%	268	2.40%	6,292	56.24%	11,188
La Salle	1,088	51.52%	956	45.27%	68	3.22%	132	6.25%	2,112
Lavaca	8,915	85.56%	1,378	13.23%	126	1.21%	7,537	72.34%	10,419
Lee	6,505	77.79%	1,719	20.56%	138	1.65%	4,786	57.24%	8,362
Leon	7,734	85.84%	1,115	12.38%	161	1.79%	6,619	73.46%	9,010
Liberty	23,983	77.21%	6,429	20.70%	651	2.10%	17,554	56.51%	31,063
Limestone	6,821	75.70%	2,045	22.69%	145	1.61%	4,776	53.00%	9,011
Lipscomb	1,094	87.66%	131	10.50%	23	1.84%	963	77.16%	1,248
Live Oak	4,165	82.28%	822	16.24%	75	1.48%	3,343	66.04%	5,062
Llano	10,698	78.53%	2,677	19.65%	248	1.82%	8,021	58.88%	13,623
Loving	75	78.95%	17	17.89%	3	3.16%	58	61.05%	95
Lubbock	83,643	67.20%	37,560	30.18%	3,266	2.62%	46,083	37.02%	124,469
Lynn	2,118	83.78%	367	14.52%	43	1.70%	1,751	69.26%	2,528
Madison	4,336	79.66%	1,012	18.59%	95	1.75%	3,324	61.07%	5,443
Marion	3,509	74.75%	1,101	23.45%	84	1.79%	2,408	51.30%	4,694
Martin	1,756	84.95%	264	12.77%	47	2.27%	1,492	72.18%	2,067
Mason	2,027	80.85%	441	17.59%	39	1.56%	1,586	63.26%	2,507
Matagorda	9,482	71.78%	3,486	26.39%	241	1.82%	5,996	45.39%	13,209
Maverick	7,287	49.46%	6,859	46.56%	586	3.98%	428	2.91%	14,732
McCulloch	2,938	83.99%	497	14.21%	63	1.80%	2,441	69.78%	3,498
McLennan	62,054	62.19%	35,632	35.71%	2,091	2.10%	26,422	26.48%	99,777
McMullen	423	88.87%	48	10.08%	5	1.05%	375	78.78%	476
Medina	16,508	67.50%	7,416	30.32%	533	2.18%	9,092	37.18%	24,457
Menard	824	79.54%	194	18.73%	18	1.74%	630	60.81%	1,036
Midland	45,032	77.40%	11,866	20.39%	1,284	2.21%	33,166	57.00%	58,182
Milam	8,347	75.63%	2,462	22.31%	227	2.06%	5,885	53.33%	11,036
Mills	2,343	85.82%	344	12.60%	43	1.58%	1,999	73.22%	2,730
Mitchell	2,059	83.26%	374	15.12%	40	1.62%	1,685	68.14%	2,473
Montague	9,489	86.15%	1,353	12.28%	172	1.56%	8,136	73.87%	11,014
Montgomery	213,797	69.75%	86,879	28.34%	5,841	1.91%	126,918	41.41%	306,517
Moore	4,186	79.76%	954	18.18%	108	2.06%	3,232	61.59%	5,248
Morris	3,958	73.42%	1,353	25.10%	80	1.48%	2,605	48.32%	5,391
Motley	592	92.21%	41	6.39%	9	1.40%	551	85.83%	642
Nacogdoches	17,072	67.01%	7,927	31.11%	478	1.88%	9,145	35.90%	25,477
Navarro	14,327	72.37%	5,120	25.86%	351	1.77%	9,207	46.51%	19,798
Newton	4,650	81.71%	972	17.08%	69	1.21%	3,678	64.63%	5,691
Nolan	3,808	75.56%	1,123	22.28%	109	2.16%	2,685	53.27%	5,040
Nueces	62,062	51.52%	55,433	46.02%	2,964	2.46%	6,629	5.50%	120,459
Ochiltree	2,669	89.09%	280	9.35%	47	1.57%	2,389	79.74%	2,996
Oldham	862	89.70%	91	9.47%	8	0.83%	771	80.23%	961
Orange	29,050	80.78%	6,285	17.48%	626	1.74%	22,765	63.30%	35,961
Palo Pinto	10,611	80.13%	2,355	17.78%	277	2.09%	8,256	62.34%	13,243
Panola	9,281	81.69%	1,935	17.03%	145	1.28%	7,346	64.66%	11,361
Parker	72,477	79.89%	16,349	18.02%	1,900	2.09%	56,128	61.87%	90,726
Parmer	2,060	83.27%	374	15.12%	40	1.62%	1,686	68.15%	2,474
Pecos	2,817	68.01%	1,206	29.12%	119	2.87%	1,611	38.89%	4,142
Polk	18,596	77.02%	5,106	21.15%	441	1.83%	13,490	55.88%	24,143
Potter	22,109	69.33%	8,933	28.01%	848	2.66%	13,176	41.32%	31,890
Presidio	651	33.56%	1,249	64.38%	40	2.06%	-598	-30.82%	1,940
Rains	5,450	83.49%	951	14.57%	127	1.94%	4,499	68.92%	6,528
Randall	51,991	77.73%	13,596	20.33%	1,302	1.95%	38,395	57.40%	66,889
Reagan	764	81.62%	156	16.67%	16	1.71%	608	64.96%	936
Real	1,574	80.76%	336	17.24%	39	2.00%	1,238	63.52%	1,949
Red River	4,498	78.40%	1,148	20.01%	91	1.59%	3,350	58.39%	5,737
Reeves	2,034	61.86%	1,142	34.73%	112	3.41%	892	27.13%	3,288
Refugio	2,004	66.12%	958	31.61%	69	2.28%	1,046	34.51%	3,031
Roberts	542	94.92%	20	3.50%	9	1.58%	522	91.42%	571
Robertson	5,982	73.62%	2,006	24.69%	137	1.69%	3,976	48.94%	8,125
Rockwall	41,726	66.96%	19,466	31.24%	1,127	1.81%	22,260	35.72%	62,319
Runnels	3,430	85.17%	525	13.04%	72	1.79%	2,905	72.14%	4,027
Rusk	16,665	77.43%	4,500	20.91%	357	1.66%	12,165	56.52%	21,522
Sabine	4,864	87.80%	612	11.05%	64	1.16%	4,252	76.75%	5,540
San Augustine	2,834	77.85%	808	21.59%	65	0.56%	2,026	56.26%	3,707
San Jacinto	10,118	79.61%	2,338	18.39%	254	2.00%	7,780	61.22%	12,710
San Patricio	16,116	63.65%	8,578	33.88%	627	2.48%	7,538	29.77%	25,321
San Saba	2,314	86.02%	333	12.38%	43	1.60%	1,981	73.64%	2,690
Schleicher	872	79.42%	205	18.67%	21	1.91%	667	60.75%	1,098
Scurry	4,683	83.16%	811	14.40%	137	2.43%	3,872	68.76%	5,631
Shackelford	1,520	88.73%	173	10.10%	20	1.17%	1,347	78.63%	1,713
Shelby	8,022	81.23%	1,756	17.78%	98	0.99%	6,266	63.45%	9,876
Sherman	791	89.18%	82	9.24%	14	1.58%	709	79.93%	887
Smith	72,205	69.95%	28,971	28.07%	2,052	1.99%	43,234	41.88%	103,228
Somervell	4,298	81.46%	859	16.28%	119	2.26%	3,439	65.18%	5,276
Starr	7,081	49.93%	6,745	47.56%	356	2.51%	336	2.37%	14,182
Stephens	3,216	86.29%	450	12.07%	61	1.64%	2,766	74.22%	3,727
Sterling	553	88.62%	56	8.97%	15	2.40%	497	79.65%	624
Stonewall	581	81.60%	120	16.85%	11	1.54%	461	64.75%	712
Sutton	1,129	81.28%	239	17.21%	21	1.51%	890	64.07%	1,389
Swisher	1,744	78.10%	440	19.70%	49	2.19%	1,304	58.40%	2,233
Tarrant	399,927	48.68%	401,742	48.91%	19,804	2.41%	-1,815	-0.22%	821,473
Taylor	39,509	71.51%	14,479	26.20%	1,264	2.29%	25,030	45.30%	55,252
Terrell	301	75.25%	92	23.00%	7	1.75%	209	52.25%	400
Terry	2,663	79.56%	609	18.20%	75	2.24%	2,054	61.37%	3,347
Throckmorton	801	90.00%	80	8.99%	9	1.01%	721	81.01%	890
Titus	7,545	74.50%	2,386	23.56%	197	1.95%	5,159	50.94%	10,128
Tom Green	31,686	70.15%	12,332	27.30%	1,152	2.55%	19,354	42.85%	45,170
Travis	157,203	27.17%	407,210	70.39%	14,128	2.44%	-250,007	-43.21%	578,541
Trinity	5,910	80.56%	1,298	17.69%	128	1.74%	4,612	62.87%	7,336
Tyler	8,001	84.16%	1,337	14.06%	169	1.78%	6,664	70.10%	9,507
Upshur	16,451	82.92%	2,994	15.09%	394	1.99%	13,457	67.83%	19,839
Upton	1,069	84.51%	164	12.96%	32	2.53%	905	71.54%	1,265
Uvalde	5,848	60.81%	3,493	36.31%	278	2.89%	2,355	24.48%	9,619
Val Verde	8,071	56.48%	5,782	40.45%	440	3.08%	2,289	16.01%	14,293
Van Zandt	23,626	84.60%	3,838	13.74%	463	1.66%	19,788	70.86%	27,927
Victoria	24,002	68.90%	10,176	29.21%	657	1.89%	13,826	39.69%	34,835
Walker	16,775	67.16%	7,728	30.94%	475	1.90%	9,047	36.22%	24,978
Waller	16,385	59.71%	10,432	38.01%	625	2.28%	5,953	21.70%	27,442
Ward	2,931	78.64%	710	19.05%	86	2.31%	2,221	59.52%	3,727
Washington	13,586	74.86%	4,240	23.36%	323	1.78%	9,346	51.50%	18,149
Webb	28,121	44.15%	33,758	53.00%	1,820	2.86%	-5,637	-8.85%	63,699
Wharton	11,915	73.00%	4,150	25.42%	258	1.58%	7,765	47.57%	16,323
Wheeler	2,025	89.88%	192	8.52%	36	1.60%	1,833	81.36%	2,253
Wichita	30,711	69.39%	12,545	28.35%	1,001	2.26%	18,166	41.05%	44,257
Wilbarger	3,419	77.13%	926	20.89%	88	1.99%	2,493	56.24%	4,433
Willacy	2,365	43.67%	2,892	53.41%	158	2.92%	-527	-9.73%	5,415
Williamson	146,451	47.85%	151,076	49.36%	8,518	2.78%	-4,625	-1.51%	306,045
Wilson	19,783	72.91%	6,802	25.07%	548	2.02%	12,981	47.84%	27,133
Winkler	1,560	82.36%	303	16.00%	31	1.64%	1,257	66.37%	1,894
Wise	31,060	81.44%	6,350	16.65%	730	1.91%	24,710	64.79%	38,140
Wood	20,129	82.75%	3,757	15.45%	438	1.80%	16,372	67.31%	24,324
Yoakum	1,928	82.36%	357	15.25%	56	2.39%	1,571	67.11%	2,341
Young	7,088	85.70%	1,063	12.85%	120	1.45%	6,025	72.84%	8,271
Zapata	2,197	51.51%	1,957	45.88%	111	2.60%	240	5.63%	4,265
Zavala	1,167	35.66%	1,994	60.92%	112	3.42%	-827	-25.27%	3,273
Totals	5,990,741	52.98%	5,031,249	44.49%	286,247	2.53%	959,492	8.48%	11,308,237

==== Counties that flipped from Democratic to Republican ====
- Brewster (largest municipality: Alpine)
- Culberson (largest municipality: Van Horn)
- Frio (largest municipality: Pearsall)
- Jefferson (largest municipality: Beaumont)
- Jim Wells (largest municipality: Alice)
- Kleberg (largest municipality: Kingsville)
- La Salle (largest municipality: Cotulla)
- Maverick (largest municipality: Eagle Pass)
- Nueces (largest municipality: Corpus Christi)
- Reeves (largest municipality: Pecos)
- Starr (largest municipality: Rio Grande City)
- Val Verde (largest municipality: Del Rio)
- Zapata (largest municipality: Zapata)

==== By congressional district ====
Cruz won 25 of 38 congressional districts.

District	Cruz	Allred	Representative
1st	73%	25%	Nathaniel Moran
2nd	58%	39%	Dan Crenshaw
3rd	56%	42%	Keith Self
4th	63%	35%	Pat Fallon
5th	60%	38%	Lance Gooden
6th	60%	37%	Jake Ellzey
7th	35%	62%	Lizzie Fletcher
8th	63%	35%	Morgan Luttrell
9th	24%	73%	Al Green
10th	59%	38%	Michael McCaul
11th	70%	28%	August Pfluger
12th	57%	40%	Kay Granger (118th Congress)
12th	57%	40%	Craig Goldman (119th Congress)
13th	71%	27%	Ronny Jackson
14th	64%	34%	Randy Weber
15th	54%	44%	Monica De La Cruz
16th	38%	58%	Veronica Escobar
17th	62%	36%	Pete Sessions
18th	26%	71%	Erica Lee Carter (118th Congress)
18th	26%	71%	Sylvester Turner (119th Congress)
19th	73%	25%	Jodey Arrington
20th	34%	63%	Joaquín Castro
21st	59%	39%	Chip Roy
22nd	56%	42%	Troy Nehls
23rd	53%	44%	Tony Gonzales
24th	54%	43%	Beth Van Duyne
25th	64%	33%	Roger Williams
26th	58%	40%	Michael Burgess (118th Congress)
26th	58%	40%	Brandon Gill (119th Congress)
27th	61%	37%	Michael Cloud
28th	48%	49%	Henry Cuellar
29th	33%	64%	Sylvia Garcia
30th	23%	75%	Jasmine Crockett
31st	58%	39%	John Carter
32nd	34%	64%	Colin Allred (118th Congress)
32nd	34%	64%	Julie Johnson (119th Congress)
33rd	28%	69%	Marc Veasey
34th	46%	52%	Vicente Gonzalez
35th	29%	68%	Greg Casar
36th	65%	33%	Brian Babin
37th	22%	75%	Lloyd Doggett
38th	57%	41%	Wesley Hunt

== Analysis ==
Cruz won a majority of Hispanic and Latino voters, particularly those living on the border with Mexico who had traditionally supported Democratic candidates; the NBC News exit poll showed 52% of Latinos supported Cruz, a 17-point increase from 2018.

Allred overperformed Kamala Harris in the concurrent presidential election in Texas by 5.5 points, receiving nearly 200,000 votes more than Harris and performing better than she did in the largely Hispanic Rio Grande Valley. He carried the Rio Grande Valley counties of Cameron, Duval, Hidalgo, Webb (Laredo), and Willacy, as well as Williamson and Tarrant counties, which Trump simultaneously carried.

== See also ==
- 2024 Texas elections

== Notes ==
Partisan clients
