= Juan Manuel Ortiz =

Juan Manuel Ortiz may refer to:

- Juanma Ortiz (footballer, born 1982), Spanish football midfielder
- Juan Manuel Ortiz (Uruguayan footballer) (born 1982), Uruguayan football forward
- Juanma Ortiz (footballer, born 1986), Spanish football forward

== See also ==
- Juan Ortiz (disambiguation)
