= List of killings by law enforcement officers in the United States, September 2018 =

This is a list of people reported killed by non-military law enforcement officers in the United States in September 2018, whether in the line of duty or not, and regardless of reason or method. The listing documents the occurrence of a death, making no implications regarding wrongdoing or justification on the part of the person killed or officer involved. Killings are arranged by date of the incident that caused death. Different death dates, if known, are noted in the description. The table below lists 90 people.

== September 2018 ==
Date	Name (and age) of deceased	Race	State (city)	Description
2018-09-30	Patrick "Pat Pat'' Kimmons (27)	Black	Oregon (Portland)	
2018-09-30	Brian Lee Rogers (40)	White	Greenback, TN	
2018-09-29	Justin "Doug" Snelson (54)	White	Okmulgee, OK	
2018-09-29	Walter Welch Jr. (40)	White	Epping, NH	
2018-09-29	Thomas Howard Luedtke (58)	White	Nampa, ID	
2018-09-28	Joseph Dawson (24)	White	Johns Island, SC	
2018-09-28	Willie Earl Simmons (23)	Black	Texas (Houston)	
2018-09-27	Juan Angel Pinedo (32)	Hispanic	Las Cruces, NM	
2018-09-27	Coltin Brennan Leblanc (23)	White	Hammond, LA	
2018-09-27	Joey Nelson (19)	White	Enid, OK	
2018-09-27	Nicholas Jesus Garza (27)	Hispanic	Kennewick, WA	
2018-09-27	Datwan Keyo Lewis (41)	Black	Palatka, FL	
2018-09-27	Michael Perez (37)	Hispanic	Honolulu, HI	
2018-09-26	Paul Braswell (29)	Black	Newark, NJ	
2018-09-25	Jaime Lopez (41)	Hispanic	Stanfordville, NY	
2018-09-25	Allen Travers (37)	Black	Newark, NJ	
2018-09-25	Dravious Burch (34)	Black	Orlando, FL	
2018-09-24	Ronald Wesley Leach (29)	White	Williamsburg, KY	
2018-09-24	Ivan Pena (42)	Hispanic	Los Angeles, CA	
2018-09-24	Michael John Stout (20)	White	Peoria, AZ	
2018-09-23	Nathaniel Sassafras (29)	Black	Maryland (Baltimore)	
2018-09-23	Jeremy Allen Conn (35)	White	Harrison, TN	
2018-09-23	Richard Joseph Jackson (36)	Unknown race	Oak Harbor, WA	
2018-09-23	Phillip Ernesto Serrano (44)	White	Reno, NV	
2018-09-22	Joshua Works (26)	White	Henderson, NV	
2018-09-20	Gillie Thurby (28)	White	Longmont, CO	
2018-09-20	Alexander Carballido (40)	Hispanic	Florida (Miami)	
2018-09-20	Freddie Joe Whitmore (55)	White	Honolulu, HI	
2018-09-19	Matthew T. Graves (33)	White	Oregon (Eagle Point)	Two police officers approached Graves in a fast-food restaurant bathroom. The officers later said he had jaywalked. After a physical altercation in which Graves punched one of the officers in the face, one of the officers shot Graves twice in the back, killing him. The officers said they believed Graves had a gun, but he was unarmed; they had mistaken one of their taser on the floor as a gun. A post-mortem examination found no traces of alcohol or drugs in Graves' body.
2018-09-19	Fernando Cruz (18)	Hispanic	Los Angeles, CA	
2018-09-19	Anthony Y. Tong (43)	Asian	Middleton, WI	
2018-09-19	Rene Herrera (39)	Hispanic	Los Angeles, CA	
2018-09-19	Royce Leon Sedotal Jr. (49)	White	League City, TX	
2018-09-19	Patrick Shawn Dowdell (61)	White	Masontown, PA	
2018-09-18	Jeffrey K. Sims (37)	White	Marysville, WA	
2018-09-18	Steve Disanzo (46)	Unknown race	Garden Grove, CA	
2018-09-18	Wendy Newton (45)		South Carolina (Nichols)	A deputy drove a police van into floodwaters after Hurricane Florence. The vehicle was swept into a rail by floodwaters, and the two women being transported drowned.
2018-09-18	Nicolette Green (43)		South Carolina (Nichols)	A deputy drove a police van into floodwaters after Hurricane Florence. The vehicle was swept into a rail by floodwaters, and the two women being transported drowned.
2018-09-18	Walter L. "Walt" Wiemann (73)	White	Renfrew, PA	
2018-09-18	Michael James Murphy (43)	White	Virginia Beach, VA	
2018-09-17	Susan Muller (54)	White	Flushing, NY	
2018-09-17	Damon Christopher Gayheart (44)	White	Hopkinsville, KY	
2018-09-17	Jose Alvarez (23)	Hispanic	Temple Hills, MD	
2018-09-16	Bruce Smith (25)	White	Manitowoc, WI	
2018-09-16	Christopher Adam Borland (40)	Unknown race	Walla Walla, WA	
2018-09-16	Ricardo "Macho" Avenia (29)	Hispanic	Lancaster, PA	
2018-09-16	Robert C. Greeson (29)	White	Garden Plain, KS	
2018-09-16	Jerry Foster (31)	Black	Shreveport, LA	
2018-09-15	Randy J. Rausch (34)	Unknown race	Vernon Hills, IL	
2018-09-15	Stephen Dove (50)	White	Jacksonville, AR	
2018-09-15	Anton Black (19)	Black	Greensboro, MD	
2018-09-15	Christopher Leonard (31)	White	Ankeny, IA	
2018-09-15	Guiselda Alicia Hernandez Cantu (35)	Hispanic	Texas (Webb County)	Over the course of two weeks, Border Patrol Agent Juan David Ortiz killed four women, all sex workers, and attempted to kill a fifth. Cantu and Ortiz were both killed on September 15 at different times.
2018-09-15	Janelle Enriquez Ortiz (28)	Hispanic	Texas (Webb County)	Over the course of two weeks, Border Patrol Agent Juan David Ortiz killed four women, all sex workers, and attempted to kill a fifth. Cantu and Ortiz were both killed on September 15 at different times.
2018-09-14	Detric Driver (46)	Black	Michigan (Detroit)	
2018-09-14	Gary Daniel McKinney (47)	White	Las Cruces, NM	
2018-09-14	Nikki Janelle Enriquez aka Humberto Ortiz (28)	Hispanic	Laredo, TX	
2018-09-14	David Huffines Jr (40)	White	Arizona (Mesa)	
2018-09-14	Johnny Lee Lloyd (53)	Black	Dover, NC	
2018-09-14	Antonio Aguirre (52)	Hispanic	Laredo, TX	
2018-09-13	Claudine Anne Luera (42)	White	Texas (Webb County)	Over the course of two weeks, Border Patrol Agent Juan David Ortiz killed four women, all sex workers, and attempted to kill a fifth.
2018-09-13	Ryan Yamasaki (36)	Asian	Nevada (Henderson)	Ryan Yamasaki, 36, was shot and killed by officers after ignoring their orders to drop a box cutter and charging at them, according to the Henderson Police Department.
2018-09-12	Rafael "Pito" Rivera (32)	Hispanic	Buffalo, NY	
2018-09-12	Thomas Watkins (38)	Black	Gary, IN	
2018-09-12	Garrett Finley Mitchell (31)	White	Cumming, GA	
2018-09-11	Edward Reynolds (57)	White	Georgetown, KY	
2018-09-10	Joel R. Andrade (53)	Unknown race	Arizona (Tucson)	
2018-09-09	Brandon Joyner (24)	Black	Greenville, NC	
2018-09-09	Dereshia Blackwell (39)	Black	Missouri City, TX	
2018-09-09	Adam Jensen (43)	Unknown race	Stanwood, WA	
2018-09-08	Ronald Singletary (43)	Black	Texas (Houston)	
2018-09-08	Demetrius Shankling (23)		Colorado (Boulder)	Shankling was being transported to a detox center in a transport van when he was found unconscious and not breathing. An autopsy ruled the manner of death as a homicide, as the sheriff's deputies had handcuffed Shankling and put him in a confined space of the van.
2018-09-07	Omar Santa Perez (29)	Hispanic	Ohio (Cincinnati)	See 2018 Cincinnati shooting
2018-09-07	Kendrick Lloyd (34)	Unknown race	Greenville, MS	
2018-09-07	DaShawn Cole (28)	Black	Pawtucket, RI	
2018-09-07	Ulman Jerald Roberts (63)	White	Citronelle, AL	
2018-09-06	Darell Richards (19)	Black	Sacramento, CA	
2018-09-06	Nick Warnell (30)	White	Moultrie, GA	
2018-09-06	Patty Maggiore (49)	White	Galveston, TX	
2018-09-06	Botham Jean (26)	Black	Texas (Dallas)	Off-duty police officer Amber Guyger murdered Jean, an accountant, after entering his apartment through the unlocked front door, unannounced. Guyger claims she believed she was in her own apartment at the time of the shooting. However, she was found guilty of Jean's murder by a Dallas jury.
2018-09-05	Mitchell Owen Buel (33)	White	Morris, AL	
2018-09-05	James Leatherwood (23)	Black	Hollywood, FL	
2018-09-05	Christopher Sage (45)	White	North Knobs, NC	
2018-09-04	Timmy Henley (27)	White	Westminster, CO	
2018-09-03	Aaron Demonta Fleming (21)	Black	Covington, GA	
2018-09-03	Fernand "Fred" Lete (70)	Hispanic	Bernalillo, NM	
2018-09-03	Mary Wheat (42)	White	Jackson, CA	
2018-09-03	Steve L. Anderson (40)	White	Cheney, WA	
2018-09-03	Melissa Ramirez (29)	Hispanic	Texas (Webb County)	Over the course of two weeks, Border Patrol Agent Juan David Ortiz killed four women, all sex workers, and attempted to kill a fifth.
2018-09-01	Oshae Terry (24)	Black	Texas (Arlington)	During a traffic stop for expired vehicle registration, Arlington police initiated a search of the vehicle driven by Terry, claiming to smell marijuana. As Terry started the vehicle and began rolling up the window, a nearby officer reached through the closing window, jumped onto the vehicle's running board, and fired several shots at Terry as he began to drive away. 1 pound (0.45 kg) of marijuana, MDMA pills and a handgun were subsequently found in the vehicle.

== See also ==
- Death in custody § United States
- Henry A. Wallace Police Crime Public Database
- List of cases of police brutality
- List of countries with annual rates and counts for killings by law enforcement officers
- List of law enforcement officers killed in the line of duty in the United States
- List of law enforcement officers convicted for an on-duty killing in the United States
- List of shootings by US immigration agents
- List of police reforms related to the George Floyd protests
- List of unarmed African Americans killed by law enforcement officers in the United States
- Lists of killings by law enforcement officers
- Police brutality in the United States
- Police misconduct § United States
- Police riot § United States
- Police use of deadly force in the United States
