= Carl O. Sherman =

American politician (born 1966)

Carl Sherman
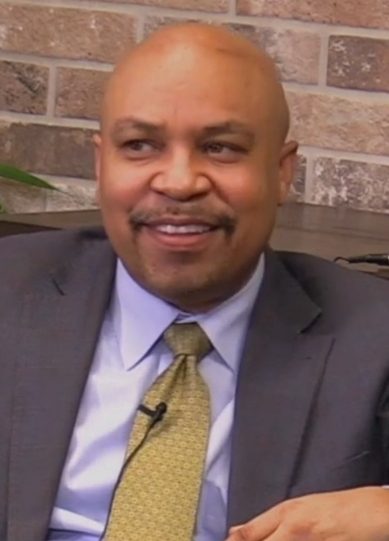

Member of the Texas House of Representatives from the 109th district
- In office January 8, 2019 – January 14, 2025
- Preceded by: Helen Giddings
- Succeeded by: Aicha Davis

20th Mayor of DeSoto
- In office 2010–2016
- Preceded by: Bobby Waddle
- Succeeded by: Curtistene McCowan

Personal details
- Born: Carl Oscar Sherman; June 13, 1966 (age 60)
- Party: Democratic
- Spouse: Michelle
- Children: 5
- Education: Northwood University
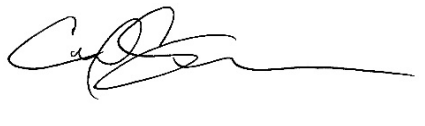
- Signature

Carl Oscar Sherman Sr. (born June 13, 1966) is an American politician who represented District 109 in the Texas House of Representatives from 2019 to 2025. A member of the Democratic Party, he served as the 20th mayor of DeSoto, Texas from 2010 to 2016.

== Political career ==
Sherman was elected mayor of DeSoto, Texas in May 2010, after having served as mayor pro tem in 2008 and 2009. He was re-elected in 2013. He left office in 2016 and was succeeded by Curtistene McCowan.

=== Texas legislature ===
In 2018, Sherman ran for election to represent District 109 in the Texas House of Representatives, to replace former representative Helen Giddings, who had decided to retire. In a four-way Democratic primary, he advanced to a runoff against Deshaundra Lockhart Jones, which he won. He was the only candidate on the ballot in the general election. Sherman ran for re-election in 2020.

In reaction to the 2018 murder of Botham Jean in Dallas, Sherman sponsored Texas House Bill 929, known as the Botham Jean Act, to enhance police accountability. The bill stemmed from controversy about murder suspect and off-duty Dallas police officer Amber Guyger's detention in a Dallas patrol car after killing Jean. The in-car camera, which also recorded sound, was switched off at the request of the president of the Dallas Police Association, who later testified that he did so to protect Guyger's attorney–client privilege. Guyger exited the patrol car afterwards and interacted with friends and fellow officers, but sound was not recorded because the camera remained deactivated. Dallas police policies at the time allowed an officer to turn off recording devices when, in the officer's judgment, there was no likelihood of "anything else evidentiary or law enforcement value occurring." Jean's family and community members said that turning off the camera led to a loss of evidence.

The Act made it illegal for police to disable body cameras at any time during their active participation in an investigation. It also requires that law enforcement policies regarding body cameras include stipulations about collecting the camera, video recording, and audio recording as evidence. The Act took effect in September 2021.

In 2022, Sherman was the keynote speaker at the Ellis County African American Hall of Fame Museum and Library Wall of Fame induction ceremony.

In 2023, Sherman opposed a bill in the Texas legislature that would have permitted accessory dwelling units (ADUs) in areas with single-family zoning. The bill was intended to increase housing supply and alleviate the housing crisis in urban areas in Texas. Sherman argued that allowing ADUs would jeopardize the American dream for people and "create havoc with their homes"

=== Electoral record ===
2018 Democratic primary: Texas House of Representatives, District 109
Party	Candidate	Votes	%
Democratic	Deshaundra Lockhart Jones	6,897	44.7%
Democratic	Carl Sherman, Sr.	6,196	40.2%
Democratic	Victoria Walton	1,413	9.2%
Democratic	Christopher Graham	913	5.9%

2018 Democratic primary runoff: Texas House of Representatives, District 109
Party	Candidate	Votes	%
Democratic	Carl Sherman, Sr.	4,074	64.2%
Democratic	Deshaundra Lockhart Jones	2,268	35.8%

2018 general election: Texas House of Representatives, District 109
Party	Candidate	Votes	%
Democratic	Carl Sherman, Sr.	51,975	99.0%
	Other/Write-in	524	1.0%

2020 Democratic primary runoff: Texas House of Representatives, District 109
Party	Candidate	Votes	%
Democratic	Carl Sherman, Sr.	14,810	61.8%
Democratic	Christopher Graham	9,142	38.2%
