= Aicha Davis =

American politician

Member of the Texas House of Representatives from the 109th district
- Incumbent
- Assumed office January 14, 2025
- Succeeded by: Carl O. Sherman

Personal details
- Party: Democratic

Aicha Davis is a Democratic member of the Texas House of Representatives, representing the 109th district since her election in 2024. Her district contains parts of Dallas. A member of the Democratic Party, she previously worked as a member of the State Board of Education.
