= Helen Giddings =

American politician

Helen Giddings (born April 21, 1945) is an American businesswoman and former politician who served as a Democratic member of the Texas House of Representatives from 1993 until January 2019. She sat on the House committees of Appropriations, Calendars, and State Affairs.

== Early life and work ==
Giddings attended the University of Texas at Arlington. She previously served as an executive with Sears, Roebuck & Company, and was responsible for human resources in 11 states. In 1989, she founded Multiplex, Inc., a specialty concessions company, of which she is president. A former board chairman of the Dallas Black Chamber of Commerce, in the 1980s, as Vice-Chair of the Dallas Transit Board, her mediation skills were employed to end a bus driver strike. Dallas' D Magazine named her one of Dallas' top power brokers of the 1980s.

== 2003 Texas legislative walkouts by Democrats: Giddings' role ==
In 2003, Texas Democrats from the state House and Senate made national headlines when they traveled across the state border to Oklahoma and New Mexico, respectively, en masse to deny a quorum for voting on a redistricting plan.

The walkout by House Democrats came in the closing weeks of the 78th Texas Legislature. Fifty-three, later 56, House Democrats ended up at a Holiday Inn in Ardmore, Oklahoma. Giddings, however, stayed behind, although written statements claimed she was in support of the Democrats who walked out. She was arrested by Texas Department of Public Safety Troopers outside her Austin apartment, and taken to the Texas capitol.

== Legislative accomplishment ==
She has focused much of her time and energy on providing equal educational opportunities for children. In 1997, she authored the legislation establishing the "Read to Succeed Program" which included then Governor George W. Bush's reading initiative. The program enables Texas drivers' to order a special license plate, and the proceeds provide financial support to the Texas school library of the driver's choice. The "Read to Succeed" license plate is the first Texas license plate designed by a child. She authored legislation that prohibits five-year-olds being placed in alternative education. In 1995, Giddings authored legislation to prohibit alcohol-related businesses near schools.

She successfully authored legislation on dyslexia and other learning disabilities as well as programs which address adult education. In higher education, she has led efforts to eliminate geographic and ethnic disparities in funding. Her endeavors have led to more equitable funding for institutions of higher learning in the Metroplex. To provide equal opportunities for minorities and rural students, in 1997 Giddings joint authored the Top 10% rule. During the 79th Legislature as the Business and Industry chair, she joint authored legislation creating the new Worker's Compensation system as well as authoring five bills focusing on Identity Theft Prevention, Punishment of Criminals, and Help for Victims of Identity Theft. In 2003, Giddings authored the 900-page Business Organization Code. As a proponent for justice, Giddings authored legislation to create an unsolved crimes unit within the Texas Rangers agency.

In 2001, she created and passed groundbreaking legislation which requires that every child in Texas receive a course in CPR once in their high school career. The Texas Affiliate of the American Heart Association awarded her the "Heart of Honor" for her work and pledged $1.5 million in materials and funding toward the measure. She has served as President of the National Foundation of Women Legislators, the first woman of color and the first Texan to be elected as president of the NFWL. She is an active member of the Women's Legislative Network of the National Conference of State Legislators. She was named to the Texas Association of Realtors 2001 Legislative Honor Roll, and by the Dallas Morning News as a "Rising Star" of the Texas Legislature.

She has worked to improve trade and cultural relations between South Africa and the United States. During her many trips to South Africa, she has received awards and recognition from former President Nelson Mandela and served on the Texas Host Committee for the visit of President, Thabo Mbeki. As a tribute to the outstanding work that Helen has done in South Africa, Prairie View A&M University has established the Helen Giddings Scholarships for Exemplary Students from South Africa, which are Presidential level scholarships. In 2013, Giddings voted against two key measures to restrict abortion.

Giddings was re-nominated in the Democratic primary held on March 4, 2014. She defeated her challenger, Genevieve Gregory, with 9,014 votes (87.7 percent) of the vote.

Preceded by John Carona	Member of the Texas House of Representatives from District 109 (DeSoto); 1996-2019	Succeeded by Carl Sherman
