= Murder of Botham Jean =

2018 murder case in Dallas, Texas, US

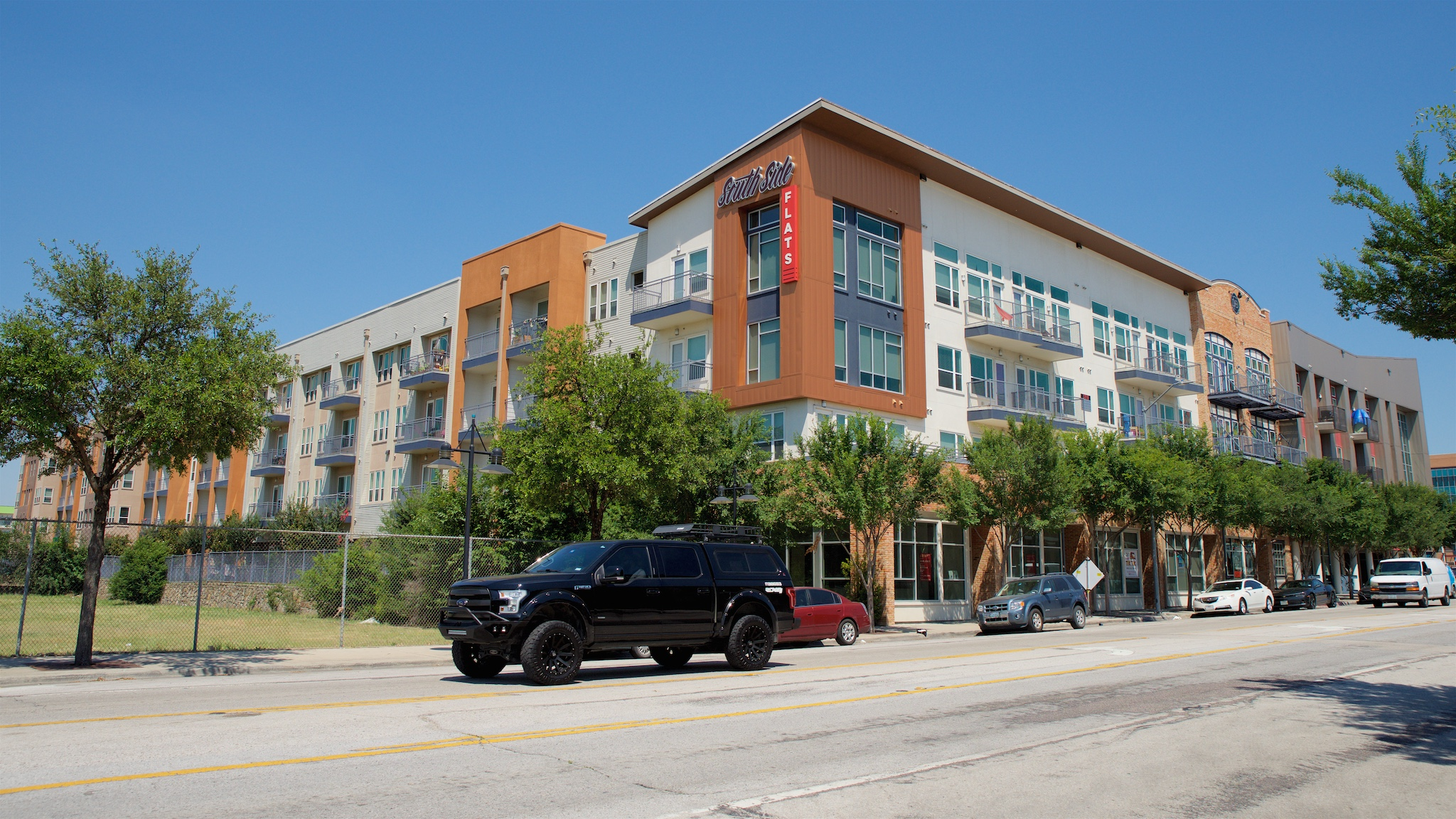
- The South Side Flats in Dallas, Texas, where the murder occurred.
- Location: 32.769592°N 96.795944°W; Dallas, Texas, United States
- Date: September 6, 2018; 8 years ago
- Attack type: Murder by shooting
- Victim: Botham Shem Jean
- Perpetrator: Amber Renée Guyger
- Charges: Manslaughter (upgraded to murder)
- Verdict: Guilty
- Convictions: Murder
- Sentence: 10 years in prison
- Litigation: Guyger ordered to pay Jean's family $98.65 million in wrongful death lawsuit

On the night of September 6, 2018, 26-year-old accountant Botham Jean was murdered in Dallas, Texas, United States, by off-duty Dallas Police Department patrol officer Amber Guyger, who entered Jean's apartment and fatally shot him. Guyger, who said that she had entered Jean's apartment believing it was her own and believed Jean to be a burglar, was initially charged with manslaughter. The absence of a murder charge led to protests and accusations of racial bias because Jean—an unarmed black man—was killed in his own home by a white off-duty officer who had apparently disregarded police protocols. On November 30, 2018, Guyger was indicted for murder. In October 2019, she was found guilty of murder and was sentenced to ten years' imprisonment. The ruling was upheld on appeal twice in 2021. In November 2024, she was found liable in a wrongful death lawsuit for killing Jean and was ordered to pay Jean's family $98.65 million. She was granted parole on October 1, 2026, and released on October 16.

== Murder ==
Location of the murder

Botham Jean and Amber Guyger lived in separate apartments in South Side Flats, a four-story apartment complex located at the corner of South Lamar Street and Powhattan Street two blocks northwest of the headquarters of Dallas Police Department where Guyger worked as a patrol officer in the Cedars district in South Dallas. The floor plans for each level of the building are mostly identical. Guyger's apartment on the third floor (number 1378), in which she had lived for approximately two months by the time of the murder, was located directly below Jean's apartment on the fourth floor (number 1478).

On September 6, 2018, Guyger left work at 9:33 pm at the end of a 13.5-hour shift. She drove to the apartment complex, parking her vehicle in the parking garage of the fourth floor at 9:46 pm. At this time, she was speaking over the phone with her romantic partner, who had telephoned her during her journey home, in a conversation which lasted until 9:55 pm. She was still wearing her uniform and handgun. Guyger walked to Jean's apartment, which she would later say she thought was her own, although there were prominent visual clues that she was on the wrong floor, including the distinctive red doormat outside Jean's apartment and the absence of a large planter like the one outside her apartment.

Attempting to unlock the door, she noticed it was ajar; although apartment doors at the complex had automatic electronic locks, the one on Jean's door was defective and did not always latch if the door was not closed forcibly. She entered the apartment and found Jean sitting in his living room eating ice cream, unarmed, with his laptop open and turned on. Although their apartments had the same floorplan, Jean's apartment had more furniture, including a coffee table and ottoman in front of the couch, and his television was substantially larger. Guyger fired her handgun twice at Jean, striking him in the chest. She would later testify that she believed him to be an intruder, and that she feared he would kill her. Guyger telephoned 9-1-1 at 9:59 pm. Jean was taken to a nearby hospital, where he died from his wound. The Texas Rangers investigated the shooting, which led to Guyger's arrest three days later.

Guyger was initially charged with manslaughter, but was later charged with murder. The initial charge of manslaughter and the racial aspect of the shooting resulted in protests in the following days.

The Dallas Police Department placed Guyger on paid administrative leave after the shooting. The department fired her on September 24, 2018.

== Victim ==
Botham Jean
- Born: Botham Shem Jean; September 29, 1991; Castries, Saint Lucia
- Died: September 6, 2018 (aged 26); Dallas, Texas, U.S.
- Cause of death: Gunshot wound
- Occupation: Accountant
- Known for: Murder victim

Botham Shem Jean, a 26-year-old Black man, was a Harding University alumnus and an accountant for PwC. Jean was born in Saint Lucia.

Following the shooting, an attorney representing Jean's family accused the Dallas Police Department of attempting to smear Jean's reputation by publicizing a police affidavit showing that police seized 0.368 ounces (10.4 g) of marijuana from Jean's apartment. The lawyers also disputed the account of the incident that Guyger told officials, which was recorded in the arrest warrant affidavit, and asserted that two independent witnesses had come forward to give recollections that conflicted with Guyger's account. An attorney for Jean's family asserted that witnesses claimed to have heard knocking on the door to Jean's apartment and that they had heard a woman's voice saying "Let me in, let me in."

== Perpetrator ==
Amber Guyger
- Born: August 9, 1988 (age 38); Dallas, Texas, U.S.
- Occupation: Former police officer
- Employer: Dallas Police Department
- Status: Paroled
- Motive: Mistaken identity (alleged)
- Conviction: Murder
- Penalty: 10 years imprisonment with possibility of parole after 5 years

Details
- Victims: Botham Jean (killed)
- Date: September 6, 2018
- Weapon: Handgun

Amber Renée Guyger (born August 9, 1988) was 30 years old at the time of the shooting. She had been with the Dallas Police Department for almost five years.

== Criminal trial ==
On November 30, 2018, Guyger was indicted on murder charges by a Dallas County grand jury. On September 22, 2019, the day before the trial began, Dallas County District Attorney John Creuzot took part in an interview regarding the trial in spite of a gag order issued by Judge Tammy Kemp in January of that year. After questioning jurors, who reported that they had not seen the interview or other media coverage of the trial, Kemp denied the defense's motion for a mistrial, and sequestered the jury.

Manslaughter charges would have merely required proof of recklessness, while murder charges require proof that the defendant intended to cause either great bodily harm or death (with death resulting). The prosecutors alleged criminal intent for two reasons: firstly, they said her arrival at the wrong apartment (on the wrong floor) was not caused by tiredness, but rather caused by the conversation she had immediately prior with her lover trying to arrange a meeting that night, and secondly that she did not follow standard police protocol of not entering a building with a potential burglar inside and instead calling for backup from the police station, which was only two blocks away.

On October 1, 2019, Guyger was found guilty of murder. The jury deliberated for six hours to reach the verdict of murder. The jurors also considered the lesser charge of manslaughter. She was the first Dallas police officer to be convicted of murder since the 1973 murder of Santos Rodriguez.

On October 2, 2019, Guyger was sentenced to 10 years in prison after the jury deliberated for an hour. During the sentencing hearing, Jean's mother Allison provided emotional testimony and some of Guyger's text messages and social media posts that were "racist and offensive" were shared. Jean's younger brother Brandt forgave and hugged Guyger during her sentencing. Jean's father Bertrum also stated that he forgave Guyger but had wanted a stiffer sentence.

Guyger's legal bills were paid by the Dallas Police Association, a police union for Dallas officers.

On October 16, 2019, Guyger's attorneys filed a notice of appeal requesting a new trial. On August 7, 2020, Guyger's attorneys filed an appeal, alleging that insufficient evidence existed to convict her of murder. The appeal sought either an acquittal, or a reduction in charge to criminally negligent homicide with a new hearing for sentencing on the reduced charge. On August 5, 2021, the Fifth Court of Appeals of Texas upheld Guyger's murder conviction, unanimously holding that the jury verdict was reasonable and Guyger's own testimony supported the murder charge. On November 17 of that year, the court withdrew its previous opinion, but again upheld her murder conviction using similar reasoning, stating that her defense that she had unknowingly entered the wrong apartment did not justify the lesser charge of criminally negligent homicide. Her appeal to the Texas Court of Criminal Appeals, the court of last resort for criminal cases in the state, was denied.

Guyger was imprisoned in the Patrick O'Daniel Unit (formerly the Mountain View Unit). She was initially eligible for parole in September 2024 after she had served half her sentence, but she was denied parole in October 2024.

Guyger was granted parole on October 1, 2026. She was released on the morning of October 16, 2026, after maintaining a "satisfactory institutional adjustment", according to a spokesperson from the Texas Board of Pardons and Paroles. She must follow parole conditions until September 2029, including maintaining a full-time job.

=== Controversy regarding police car camera ===
After the shooting, Guyger was detained and placed in the patrol car of Dallas police sergeant Breanna Valentine, who was then approached by Sergeant Mike Mata, Valentine's superior and president of the Dallas Police Association. Mata told Valentine to shut off the in-car camera, which recorded sound, so that he and Guyger could talk privately, and Valentine complied. Mata testified at Guyger's trial that turning off the camera was standard procedure intended to protect Guyger's attorney–client privilege, as she was planning to call her attorney. Guyger's defense attorney endorsed Mata's statement, but prosecutors disputed whether it was appropriate or normal to turn off the camera, saying that Guyger was given special treatment because she was a police officer. Valentine testified that she sequestered Guyger in the patrol car to isolate her from the situation, but surveillance footage showed Mata allowing Guyger to exit the patrol car afterwards, talking to her, and allowing her to interact with friends and other officers.

Dallas police policies at the time allowed an officer to turn off recording devices when, in the officer's judgment, there was no likelihood of "anything else evidentiary or law enforcement value occurring." [sic] Jean's family and community members said that turning off the camera led to a loss of evidence. Valentine testified that she would not have turned it off if she had realized that Guyger was off-duty when the shooting occurred. Mata denied wrongdoing and said that he welcomed an investigation by internal affairs. In July 2020, prosecutors referred Mata to grand jury for tampering with evidence, but the jury declined to indict him. A Dallas police spokesman said that an internal investigation into Mata's conduct would continue. Mata declined to comment to the Dallas Morning News.

=== Controversies involving witnesses ===
On January 31, 2019, ABC News reported that a female witness—identified only as "Bunny" — had taken a video of Guyger's actions immediately after the shooting. The witness claimed to have been harassed and threatened by unidentified Internet trolls after providing the video to the Dallas County District Attorney's Office and later posting it on social media.

On October 4, 2019, key prosecution witness and Jean's across-the-hall neighbor, Joshua Brown, was shot and killed in the parking lot of another apartment complex he had moved to, about 5 miles (8.0 km) from where Jean and Guyger had lived. Witnesses could not describe the shooter or shooters, only the vehicle they drove.

On October 8, Dallas police announced that they had identified three suspects in Brown's killing and had arrested one of them, and that the suspects were engaged in a drug deal with Brown when he was shot. A search of Brown's apartment yielded 12 pounds (5.4 kg) of marijuana, 5.04 ounces (143 g) of THC cartridges and $4,000 in cash; however, advocates questioned police claims that the three men had traveled 300 miles (480 km) from Alexandria, Louisiana, to purchase drugs from Brown, and an attorney representing Brown's family called for an independent investigation by another agency. Dallas Assistant Police Chief Avery Brown denied that Joshua Brown's death was related to Guyger's trial. A second suspect was arrested the next day, and on December 8, all three men were indicted on charges of capital murder, although one of them remained at large.

== Civil trial ==
On November 20, 2024, a civil trial jury awarded Jean's family $98.65 million, including about $60 million in punitive damages and $38.6 million in compensatory damages, in a wrongful death claim against Guyger—a figure nearly double what the family sought. The family said that Dallas police inadequately trained Guyger and also named the city of Dallas as a defendant, but the city was dismissed from the lawsuit, leaving Guyger solely responsible for paying the damages. Guyger initially represented herself but did not appear at trial and declined to provide legal representation. The family said it will donate any damages they receive to the Botham Jean Foundation, potentially including the proceeds from any film or book deals made by Guyger. The family acknowledged they are unlikely to receive the full amount.

== Memorials ==
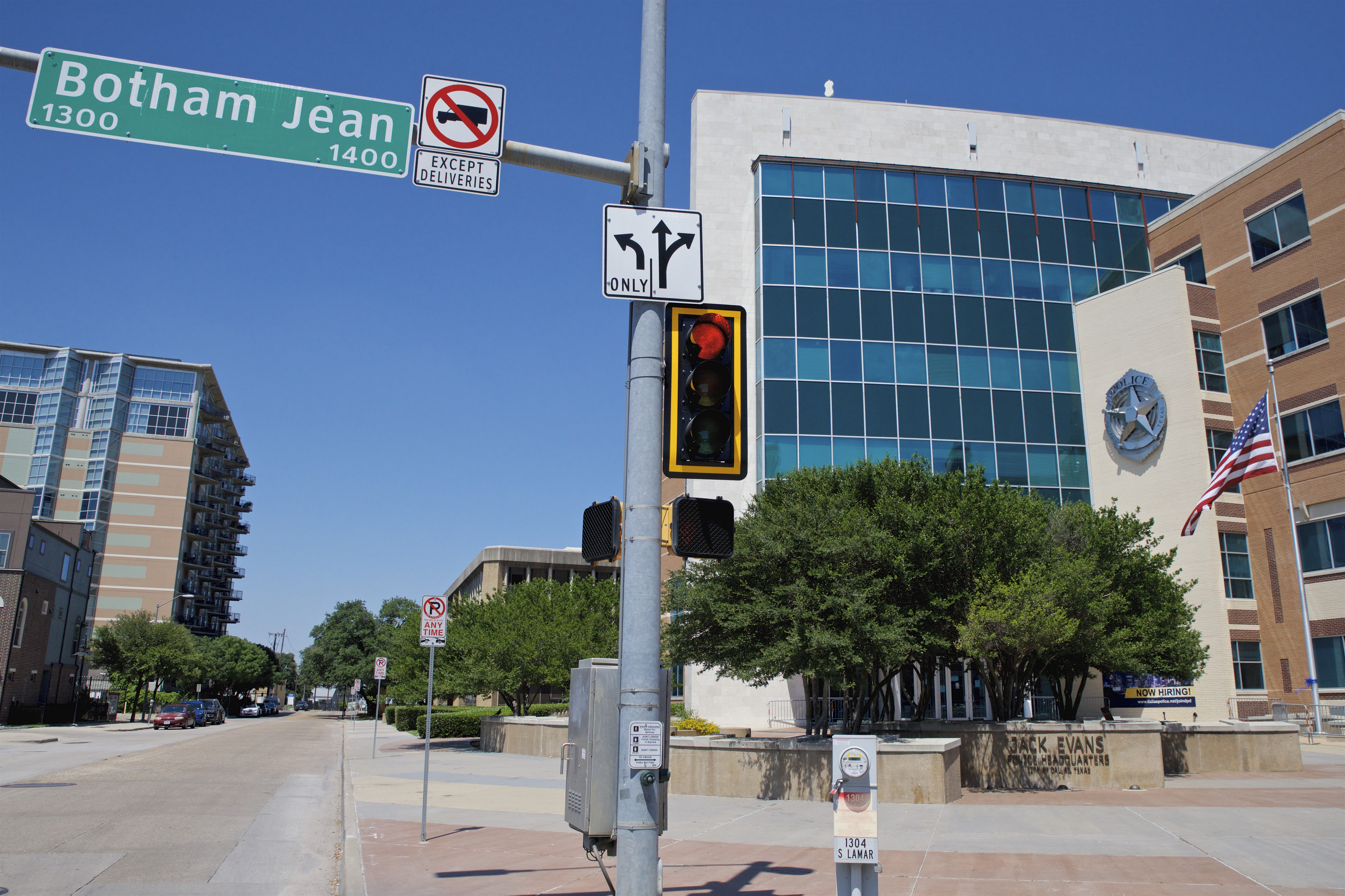
Dallas Police headquarters in 2021, with updated Botham Jean Blvd. (formerly Lamar St.) sign.

On January 13, 2021, the Dallas City Council unanimously voted to rename approximately 4 miles (6.4 km) of South Lamar Street from Interstate 30 to South Central Expressway (S.M. Wright Freeway) as Botham Jean Boulevard. The street passes Jean's former apartment and Dallas police headquarters.

As a reaction to the controversy over the police car camera, Texas state representative Carl O. Sherman sponsored Texas House Bill 929, known as the Botham Jean Act, to enhance police accountability. The Act made it illegal for police to disable body cameras at any time during their active participation in an investigation. It also requires that law enforcement policies regarding body cameras include stipulations about collecting the camera, video recording, and audio recording as evidence. The Act took effect in September 2021.

== See also ==
- List of unarmed African Americans killed by law enforcement officers in the United States
- List of killings by law enforcement officers in the United States, September 2018
- Shooting of Atatiana Jefferson
