= Ellis County African American Hall of Fame Museum and Library =

Museum and library in Texas

Coordinates: 32°23′01″N 96°50′33″W

The Ellis County African American Hall of Fame Museum and Library was established to recognize and tell the stories of African Americans with ties to the city of Waxahachie, Texas. The museum and library are housed in a historic fraternal building in Waxahachie, Texas. The building was built in 1926 and housed a lodge of the Knights of Pythias of North America, South America, Europe, Asia, Africa and Australia. The building was listed as endangered before being restored and receiving funding for roof work.

The museum and library, which opened in 2016, are at 441 East Martin Luther King Jr. Boulevard. Jamal Rasheed, CEO and President of the Hall of Fame, has spoken about the area’s Prince Hall Cemetery, efforts to preserve it and the veterans buried there.

== Recognition ==
In 2022 a ceremony was planned to induct new wall of fame honorees. Carl O. Sherman Sr. was the keynote speaker. The organization also maintains monuments in the area.

Jamal Rasheed advocated to have a section of highway named for aviator Bessie Coleman honored. An overpass where her home was located was renamed for her.
