= Texas's 109th House of Representatives district =

American legislative district

Texas's 109th State House of Representatives district
Representative
Aicha Davis; D–DeSoto
- Demographics: 14.9% White; 54.6% Black; 28.9% Hispanic; 1.7% Asian
- Population (2020) • Voting age: 184,600; 135,061

The 109th district of the Texas House of Representatives consists of portions of southern Dallas County. This includes Cedar Hill, Lancaster, Hutchins, Wilmer, Seagoville, southern parts of the city of Dallas, and half of DeSoto. The current representative is Aicha Davis, who has represented the district since 2019.

The district contains a portion of major highway I-35.

== Members ==
- Bill Hammond
- John Carona
- Helen Giddings
- Carl Sherman
- Aicha Davis
