= Combined Law Enforcement Associations of Texas =

Police union in Texas

The Combined Law Enforcement Associations of Texas (CLEAT) is the largest police union in Texas.

It is active in local politics through the political action committee CLEAT PAC. It lobbies for legislation and endorses candidates for office (both Republicans and Democrats).

In 2020–2021, it supported the passage of Texas Senate Bill 22. Under the bill, officers dying from COVID-19 are considered line of duty deaths, which grants benefits to their surviving family members.

In 2022, CLEAT publicly endorsed incumbent Greg Abbott for the 2022 Texas gubernatorial election.

CLEAT has accused sheriff offices of union busting and fought for the right of union representatives to be paid for their union work.
