= Dallas Police Association =

Police union

- Founded: 1959
- Location: United States
- Key people: Michael J. Mata
- Website: dallaspa.org

The Dallas Police Association is the largest and oldest police union for sworn members of the Dallas Police Force in Dallas, Texas. The Dallas Police Association also has a musical choir.

== Controversies ==
In September 2019, activists accused Dallas Police Association president Mike Mata of improper interference after he instructed officer Amber Guyger to turn off her body camera shortly after she fatally shot Botham Jean. In October, Dallas Police Chief Reneé Hall announced an internal affairs investigation to the media on Sergeant Mata. In July 2020, a grand jury ultimately declined to indict Mata.
