= Juan David Ortiz =

American serial killer (born 1983)

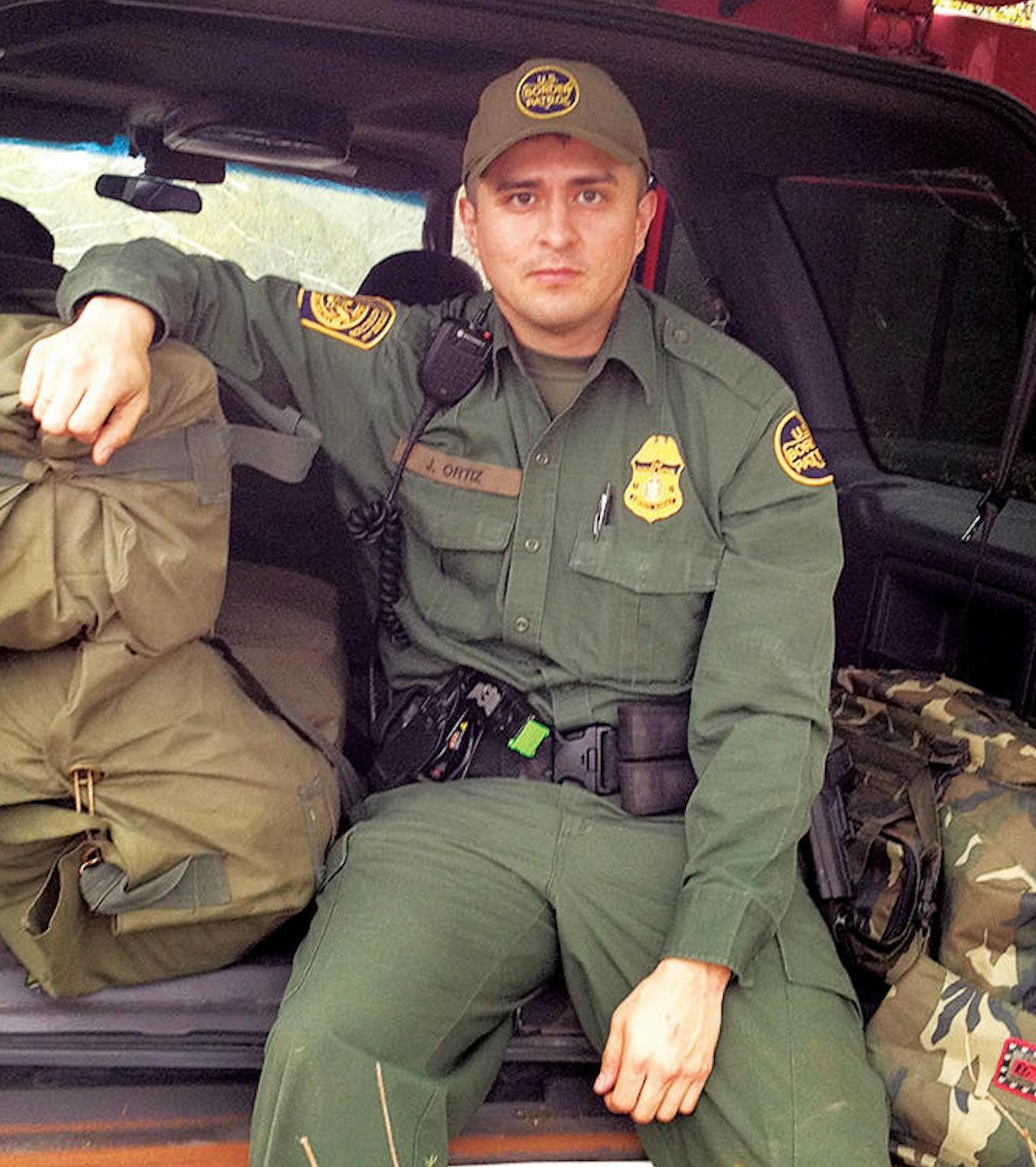
- Ortiz during his time as a U.S. Border Patrol agent
- Born: May 22, 1983 (age 43); Brownsville, Texas, U.S.
- Known for: Convicted serial killer
- Spouse: Daniella J. Ortiz (née Guajardo)
- Children: 3
- Status: Incarcerated
- Motive: Hatred for sex workers
- Conviction: Capital murder
- Penalty: Life imprisonment without parole

Details
- Victims: 4
- Span of crimes: September 3 – 15, 2018
- Country: United States
- State: Texas
- Location: Webb County

Juan David Ortiz (born May 22, 1983) is an American serial killer and former Border Patrol agent who murdered four sex workers in Texas in September 2018. He was caught and arrested after a potential victim escaped and alerted police.

== Personal life ==
Ortiz was a member of the United States Border Patrol for 10 years, where he worked as an intelligence operator. He is also a United States Navy veteran, having served as a hospital corpsman from 2001 to 2009. He had no reported disciplinary issues while he served. He and his wife had three children. He earned a bachelor's degree from American Military University and a master's degree from St. Mary's University in Texas.

The Sheriff's Chief Deputy said Ortiz planned to commit suicide by cop, stocking up on weapons and trying to goad police with his phone when arrested. In the hours before his arrest, he posted two goodbyes to people he knew on Facebook.

== Arrest ==
On September 14, 2018, Erika Peña had escaped from Ortiz's vehicle after he threatened her with a gun. The shirtless Peña ran towards a state trooper who happened to be at the same gas station pumping gas. She relayed her situation to the officer, named Ortiz as the perpetrator, and provided the make and model of his car. A BOLO was then put out and officers later found his car at a nearby convenience store while an unsuspecting Ortiz was close by. Once officers saw Ortiz, one of them explained to him from a distance that his vehicle was connected with murder cases. After that, Ortiz ran on foot to a nearby parking garage of the Ava Hotel, where he was found in the bed of a truck and arrested.

== Victims ==
Ortiz committed the following homicides:

- Melissa Ramirez, 29, killed on September 3, 2018
- Claudine Anne Luera, 42, killed on September 13, 2018
- Guiselda Alicia Hernandez Cantu, 35, killed on September 15, 2018
- Janelle Ortiz, 28, killed on September 15, 2018

He is also suspected of kidnapping another woman, who escaped. The five victims were sex workers; one was transgender. Ortiz confessed after his arrest that he had started killing on September 3 and that he personally knew the first two victims. He allegedly killed the other two on the morning of September 15 in the five hours between the assault on the escaped woman and his capture.

Ortiz confessed to picking up a mother of two named Melissa Ramirez on September 3. She was 29 years old. After driving down a rural county road in Webb County, two miles outside the city, Ramirez got out of the vehicle to urinate, when Ortiz says he shot her multiple times. Her body was discovered the next day.

Ten days later, Ortiz picked up 42-year-old Claudine Anne Luera, a mother of five. After she confronted him about the disappearance of her friend Ramirez, she was getting out of his vehicle when he shot her in the head. She was found alive but died hours later in the hospital.

The last two victims were found on a five-mile stretch of Highway 35. Ortiz confessed to investigators that he took them in two trips from Laredo and killed them in similar manners. He led police to the site of the crime. Unlike Ramirez and Luera, he had no prior contact with these victims.

== Trial and conviction ==
Ortiz was charged in Webb County with four counts of murder and one count of aggravated assault with a deadly weapon, and was later indicted on one count of capital murder, aggravated assault with a deadly weapon, unlawful restraint and evading arrest. Ortiz made a videotaped confession to the four murders and fifth attempted murder to investigators, and allegedly has led investigators to one of the bodies. During interviews with investigators, Ortiz reportedly expressed a hatred of prostitutes. Investigators have stated that they have not ruled out the possibility that Ortiz had additional victims.

In January 2019, Ortiz pleaded not guilty on four counts of murder and one count of assault. In October 2022, the District Attorney announced that he would not seek the death penalty against Ortiz at the unanimous request of the families of his four victims and the victim who escaped.

Ortiz's trial began November 28, 2022. On December 7, 2022, Ortiz was convicted of capital murder and sentenced to life in prison without parole.
