= Juan Manuel Ortiz (Uruguayan footballer) =

Uruguayan footballer (born 1982)

Personal information
- Full name: Juan Manuel Ortíz Prieto
- Date of birth: 14 April 1982 (age 44)
- Place of birth: Montevideo, Uruguay
- Height: 1.80 m (5 ft 11 in)
- Position: Forward

Senior career*
Years	Team	Apps	(Gls)
–2003	Racing Club de Montevideo		
2003	→ C.A. Cerro (loan)		
2003–2004	Estudiantes de La Plata	2	(0)
2004–2006	Danubio F.C.		
2006	Club Sportivo Cerrito	10	(1)
2007	Peñarol		
2007	Club Atlético Huracán	2	(0)
2008	Club Sportivo Cerrito		
2008–2009	Club Atlético River Plate	12	(0)
2009–2010	Club Sportivo Cerrito	28	(5)
2010–2014	C.A. Fénix	70	(8)
2014–2018	Miramar Misiones	93	(12)
2019	Albion F.C.	15	(1)
2020–2022	Club Sportivo Cerrito	58	(4)
Total		217	(31)
- * Club domestic league appearances and goals

Juan Manuel Ortiz Prieto (born 14 April 1982) is a Uruguayan former footballer who plays as a forward.

== Career ==
In 2003, Ortiz travelled with Club Nacional de Football, one of the most successful Uruguayan teams, to the Peace Cup in South Korea. Despite this, he was not allowed to sign with the club so joined Argentinean side Estudiantes de La Plata instead.

For 2007, he signed for Peñarol, the most successful team in Uruguay but only stayed for half a season.

After playing for Argentinean outfit Club Atlético Huracán, Ortiz enjoyed a four-season stint with C.A. Fénix. He then spent five seasons with Miramar Misiones in the Uruguayan second division before leaving after relegation to the third division at the end of 2018.
