= Juanma Ortiz (footballer, born 1986) =

Spanish footballer

Personal information
- Full name: Juan Manuel Ortiz Jiménez
- Date of birth: 28 May 1986 (age 40)
- Place of birth: Atarfe, Spain
- Height: 1.73 m (5 ft 8 in)
- Position: Forward

Youth career
- CP Granada 74

Senior career*
Years	Team	Apps	(Gls)
2005–2007	CP Granada 74	46	(15)
2007–2009	Granada 74 CF	30	(1)
2008	→ Lucena (loan)	16	(2)
2009–2010	Jerez	25	(7)
2010–2011	Loja	34	(21)
2011–2012	Jaén	20	(5)
2012–2013	Loja	12	(0)
2013–2014	Villarrobledo	30	(25)
2014–2015	Socuéllamos	13	(1)
2015–2016	Villarrubia	27	(8)
2016–2018	Grindavík	16	(2)
2018	Lincoln Red Imps	6	(4)
2019–2020	Móstoles URJC	7	(3)
- * Club domestic league appearances and goals

Juan Manuel "Juanma" Ortiz Jiménez (born 28 May 1986) is a Spanish former footballer who played as a forward.

== Club career ==
Born in Atarfe, Granada, Andalusia, Ortiz made his senior debuts with local CP Granada 74 in the 2005–06 season. At the start of the 2007–08 campaign, his side became Granada 74 CF's reserve team and he made his professional debut with the latter on 20 October 2007, coming on as a late substitute in a 1–0 home win over Polideportivo Ejido in the Segunda División.

On 4 January 2008 Ortiz was loaned to Lucena CF of the Segunda División B. He subsequently returned to Granada 74 in June, being assigned to the main squad. In the following years he competed in the third level but also in Tercera División, representing Jerez CF, Loja CD (two stints), Real Jaén, CP Villarrobledo and UD Socuéllamos.
